= Megapolis Festival =

MEGAPOLIS Audio Festival
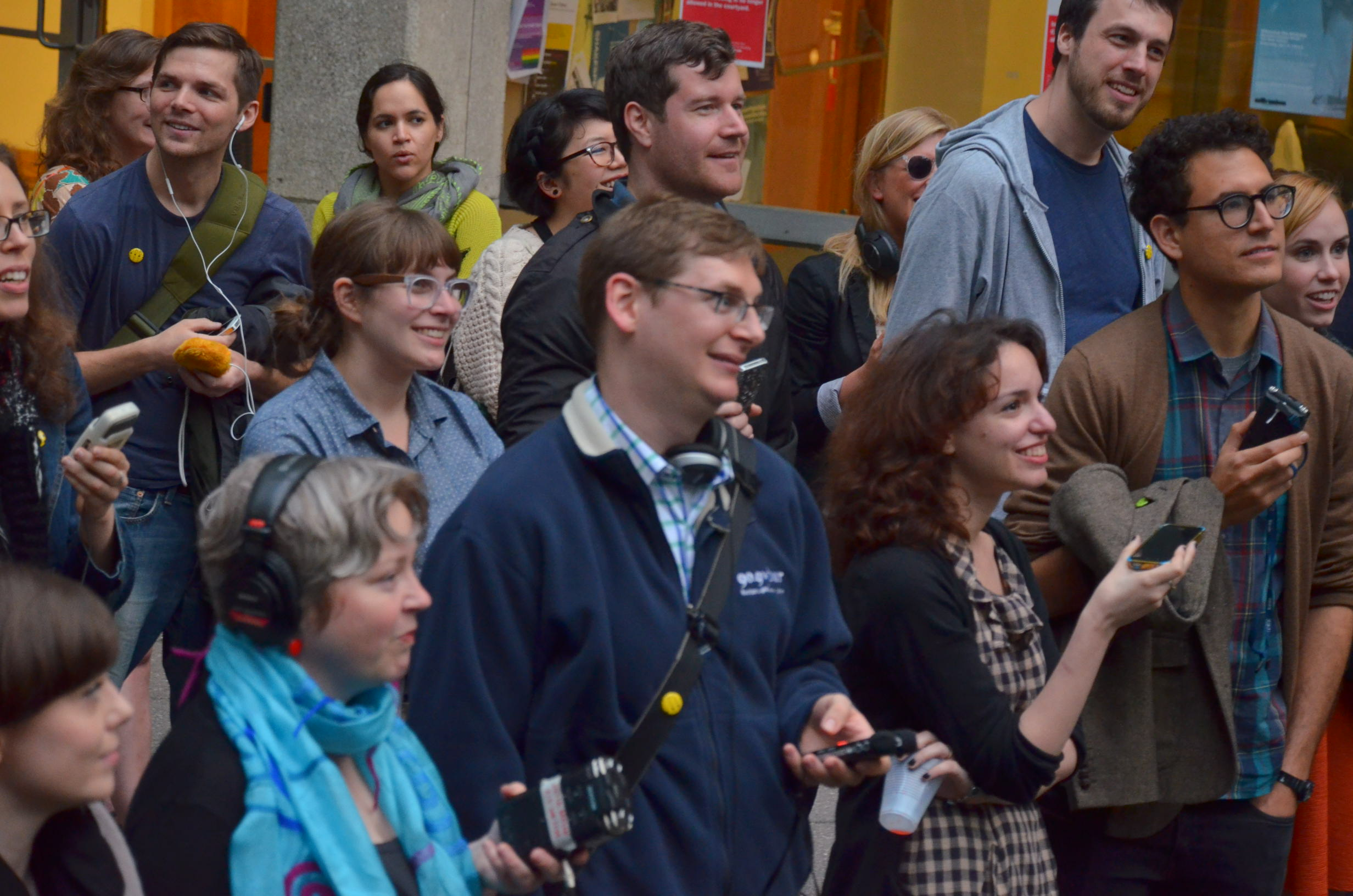
- Group interviewing & recording exercise (outdoor event), 2013 MEGAPOLIS Audio Festival, NYC
- Status: Active
- Genre: Festival
- Frequency: Every 1-3 years
- Locations: 2009 Cambridge, MA; 2010 Baltimore; 2013 New York City; 2015 Oakland
- Country: United States
- Inaugurated: 24 April 2009
- Most recent: 5 June 2015

The Megapolis Audio Festival (aka MEGAPOLIS) is a weekend-long event dedicated to the art of sound and to do-it-yourself (DIY) culture. The festival serves as a forum for artists, documentarians, musicians, and fans, producing and presenting audio works online, on-air, and on the stage.

MEGAPOLIS was founded in 2008 by Justin Grotelueschen (managing director) and Nick van der Kolk (of Love and Radio) and is administered by a new team of organizers each year.

The name Megapolis is a variation of megalopolis, referring originally to the Northeast megalopolis of the United States and to the cultural influence of an urban environment on the soundscape.

== Past festivals ==
=== 2009 ===
The inaugural MEGAPOLIS Audio Festival kicked off in Cambridge, Massachusetts, starting on April 24, 2009, at the Massasoit Elks Lodge and continuing April 25 and 26 at the Pierre Menard Gallery, with some events in Boston. Featured events included:

- A performance by Gregory Whitehead, radio theatre legend
- An audio documentary listening room from the Third Coast International Audio Festival
- An opening night of intense musics led by The Lothars, theremin-infused psych rock from Boston, along with the Boston Typewriter Orchestra, a man manipulating the radio waves with a steering wheel, and a demonstration of culinary auditory delights

Over 40 artists from across North America and from countries beyond combined with local artists to perform, install works, and conduct workshops and tours under the general theme of the megapolis, including:

- workshops for building your own instruments and contact microphones
- an audio-making slumber party
- a bicycle-powered 8-track player
- a clandestine audio tour of an insane asylum
- a presentation on the cross-pollination of poetry and sound

Co-sponsored Festival events included a media archaeology of Boston at the Carpenter Center at Harvard University, a live cello score of a museum construction at the Axiom Gallery in Jamaica Plain, Massachusetts, and a live performance of the WNYC science program Radio Lab at the Museum of Science in Boston.

=== 2010 ===
The second MEGAPOLIS occurred in Baltimore, Maryland starting on May 14 at the Windup Space and continued May 15 and 16 starting at the Hexagon Gallery. The 2010 event featured several high-profile artists including:

- Felix Kubin, sci-fi music and radio visionary from Germany
- Lucky Dragons, psychedelic electronic artists from Los Angeles
- David Kestenbaum, science and economics correspondent for NPR

Over 60 artists from around the world interpreted the festival theme of travel during:

- audio scavenger hunts with iPhones and low-wattage transmitters
- collaborative sound-making performances using contact mics attached to parachutes and knitting needles
- 1-800-numbers that attendees could call that dealt out exercises and suggestions designed to elicit aural experiences
- booths where participants could retell their nightmares and strain to hear to tiny sounds
- existentialist theatrical tours led by gnomes who encounter deviant characters along a path to 'enlightenment'
- audio transmissions between live-mic'd venues using FM and shortwave radio

=== 2013 ===
The third MEGAPOLIS Audio Festival took place in New York City, from April 19–21, 2013, with most events happening in and around the New School. More than 100 artists participated including:

- Leif Elggren
- Mountains (Thrill Jockey records)
- Flutronix
- Kitchen Sisters (NPR)

Artists loosely interpreted the festival theme of tourism through more than 60 events such as:

- “noise” karaoke, where participants sing hit songs as the DJ mangles their vocals through live processing
- Foley effect workshop recording food items then sampled and mixed live in a dance music tent
- helmet that used bone conduction to “hear” sounds
- experimental one-man theatre backed by suffocating noise music and harrowing spoken word
- global experiments in musical improvisation using telecommunications networks

=== 2015 ===
The fourth MEGAPOLIS was the first held outside the Northeast megalopolis, instead popping up within the Northern California megaregion. This event kicked off at The LAB in San Francisco CA on July 5, 2015, continuing the 6th at various venues in Oakland before landing at the Omni Commons on the 7th. Some of the artists featured that weekend:

- Roman Mars, executive producer of highly acclaimed podcast 99% Invisible
- Matmos, experimental electronic music duo; collaborated on albums with Icelandic musician Björk
- Al Letson, Peabody-award-winning radio host, poet, playwright, and actor
- Doseone, a poet, rapper, singer, painter, producer, and member of cLOUDDEAD, anticon, and more
- Fantastic Negrito, winner of NPR's 2015 Tiny Desk Concert Contest
- Kevin Blechdom (Blectum From Blechdom), a Bay Area experimental electronic musician self-dubbed as an avenging angel of pop music
- Song Exploder, a podcast where artists deconstruct their songs from the inside out
- Gamelan X, ensemble that remixes the ritual of a Balinese procession with a decidedly west coast twist

The theme of the 2015 MEGAPOLIS Festival was the frontier and featured 30 events including:

- an immersive installation of sound-emitting light bulbs that react to your presence
- interactive presentations on scientific innovations in music and storytelling through conscious thought control as well as infrasound imperceptible to the human ear
- an exercise in rapid prototyping using the basics of design thinking to introduce the idea of iterative problem solving for artists
- hacking and soldering workshops to create Moldover's Light-Theremin CD cases, low-wattage radio transmitters, homemade synthesizers, and manipulated game controllers
- yoga together with drone music
