= The Memory Palace =

History podcast

Presentation
- Hosted by: Nate DiMeo
- Genre: History
- Language: English
- Updates: Current
- Length: 5–20 min.

Production
- No. of episodes: 193

Publication
- Original release: November 12, 2008
- Provider: Maximum Fun (2012–2015); Radiotopia (2015–present)

The Memory Palace is a monthly historical podcast hosted by Nate DiMeo that debuted in 2008. The program features historical narratives concerning such subjects as the Cardiff Giant and the CIA project Acoustic Kitty. It is currently distributed online by Radiotopia.

== History ==
In 2009, Scottsdale Museum of Contemporary Art commissioned a version of the episode "A Brief Eulogy for a Consumer Electronics Product" for its Rewind Remix Replay exhibit.

In July 2011, design podcast 99% Invisible commissioned the episode "A Stretch".

In August 2011, Slate commissioned a series of "Civil War Stories" in conjunction with their Slate Daily Podcast.

In July 2012, Maximum Fun began supporting The Memory Palace. The two parted ways in early 2015. The podcast joined Radiotopia in June 2015.

== Reception ==
99% Invisible's Roman Mars described The Memory Palace as "sometimes heartbreaking, sometimes hysterical, and often a wonderful mix of both."

The A.V. Club called The Memory Palace a "brisk and sadly infrequent podcast" whose episodes feature "a kind of precious, deadpan delivery similar to This American Life, but more humorous, backed by a surprisingly evocative and effective musical score."

Boing Boing's David Pescovitz called The Memory Palace "terrific," "excellent," and "one of my favorite podcasts." While guest blogging for Boing Boing, Douglas Rushkoff described The Memory Palace as "highly textured historical narratives about stuff we might not know or remember." Boing Boing's Mark Frauenfelder called The Memory Palace one of his "favorite podcasts of 2012" comparing it to Paul Harvey's radio program The Rest of the Story.

The show was nominated for the 2015 Peabody Awards.

== See also ==
- List of history podcasts
