= Tamás Király =

Hungarian fashion designer (1952–2013)

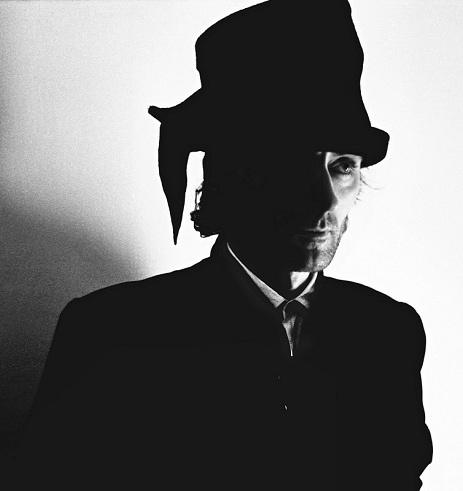
- Király in 1987
- Born: 13 September 1952; Gyöngyös, Hungarian People's Republic
- Died: 7 April 2013 (aged 60); Budapest, Hungary
- Cause of death: Murder (strangulation)
- Occupations: Fashion designer; costume designer; performance artist
- Style: Avant-garde, queer art

Tamás Király (toh-MAHSH keer-EYE; 13 September 1952 – 7 April 2013) was a Hungarian underground avant-garde fashion designer active beginning in the 1980s. In many cases, Király used found materials, took clues from queer art, and employed geometric forms in a "decadent" manner; in at least some projects of the period, he took additional inspiration from previous experiments within the Russian avant-garde scene. Though not expressly political, his work sometimes flaunted the artistic conventions permitted by the communist regime; authorities tolerated his shows, which came with performance art elements, but did not promote them. He relied on self-promotion, establishing an unconventional store in Budapest and living in poverty. Throughout his life, he was opposed to selling his creations as wearable clothes.

Beyond his cult following in Hungary, Király achieved international fame after he participated in the 1988 Dressater fashion show in West Berlin, as the only designer from the Eastern Bloc. This allowed him to live from his shows in post-communist Hungary. Though he remained focused on Budapest—he had a studio in Józsefváros, and was affiliated with the NA-NE artists' collective—he would sometimes showcase his work in provincial Hungarian towns. He was murdered in 2013 by a man with whom he was possibly having a sexual encounter. Academics have posthumously given additional attention to his work, much of which is preserved by the Museum of Applied Arts.

== Biography ==
=== Early life and debut years ===
Király was born on 13 September 1952, and grew up in the town of Gyöngyös, in what was then the Hungarian People's Republic. Reportedly, he first performed in public in that town. He also traveled to neighboring Vámosgyörk, where, as he recalled in 1998, he "got my ears pierced. This was not an everyday thing at that time." In May 1971, as a student at Berze Nagy János High School, he was granted a second prize ("bronze certificate") at an art festival organized by the Hungarian Young Communist League. He moved to Budapest, where, after receiving encouragements from costume-maker Gizella "Gizi" Koppány, he began to study design. For a time, he was employed as a display window designer. His first film credits were as Koppány's assistant costume designer in Narcissus and Psyche, released in 1981 by Gábor Bódy. It "started him on the path toward clothing design."

Király's career as an independent fashion designer coincided with Hungary's experiment in "Goulash Communism"—integrating free-market elements to the socialist command economy and loosening political censorship restrictions. He initially sold his creations out of New Art Studio, an underground boutique in central Budapest, whose main founder was his mentor, Koppány. Though "his store did not have a sales counter, and customers were received at extreme opening hours", it was a major success, with queues of customers meandering around the street-corner. Király also flaunted convention by using live models in the display window. Beginning in 1981, he organized "fashion walks" on Váci Street, an upscale fashion district in central Pest, in which his friends would dress up in outre outfits without permits, including trash bags and bank notes. His first fashion show was at the Fiatal Művészek Klubja (FMK; "Club for Young Artists") in 1983. Király often showcased his works at the Petőfi Csarnok, a large community center with a concert hall. The runway shows he held there, which he called "fashion performances," incorporated elements of contemporary dance and performance art. He also collaborated with theater groups starting in the 1980s, most famously designing white- and cream-colored costumes evoking the phantasmagoric atmosphere of A Midsummer Night's Dream for a reinterpretation by the Baltazar Theatre, a company of intellectually disabled actors.

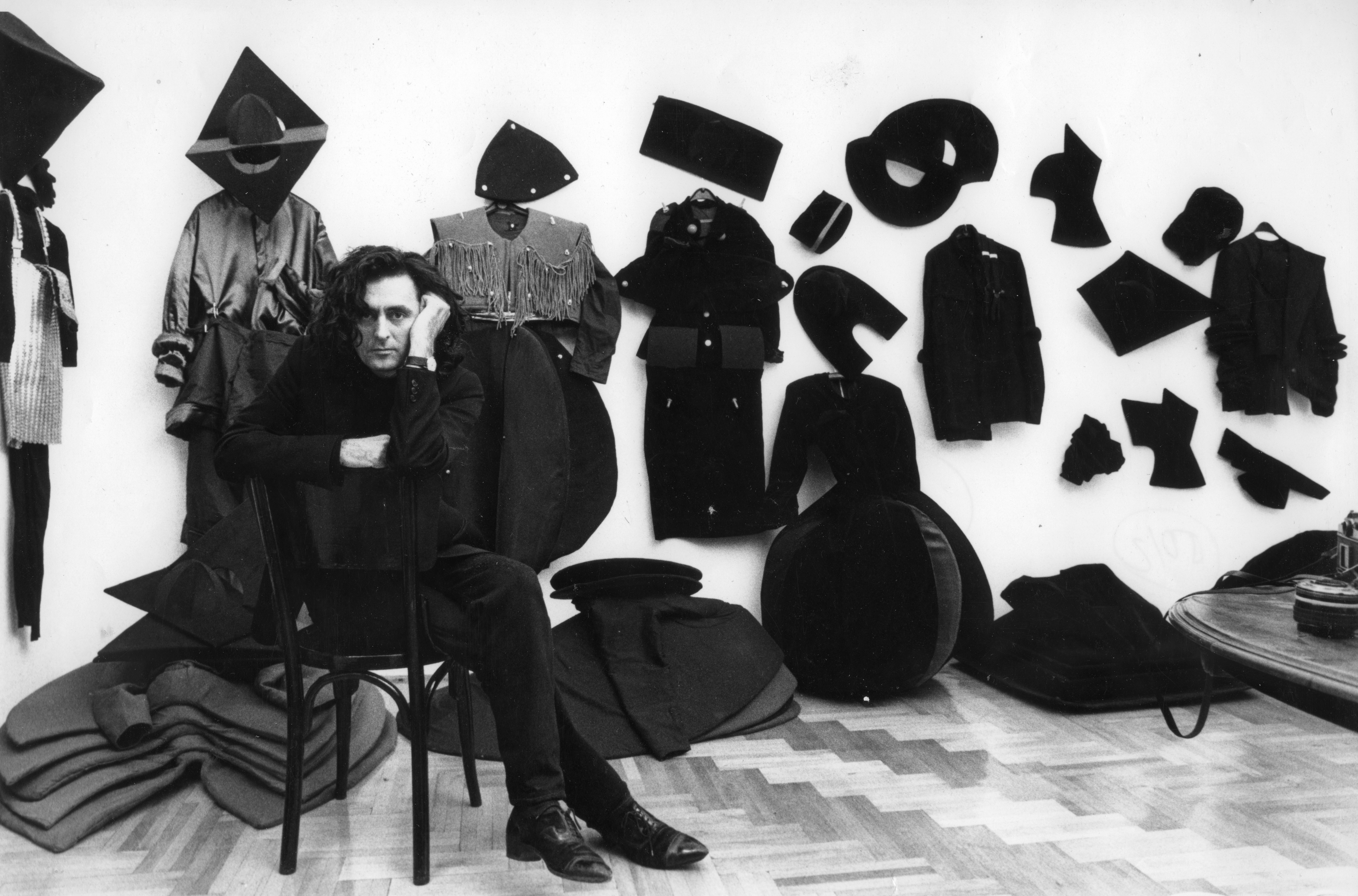
Király sitting with some of his designs, 1988

After a "chance encounter" during one his frequent travels in West Berlin, Király was co-opted as a costume designer for Az Emberevő szerelme ("A Man-eater's Love"), a 1984 film produced by Mafilm and ZDF. In 1988, he presented at the Dressater fashion show in West Berlin as the only designer from an Eastern Bloc country, having been recruited by Vivienne Westwood. According to a 1989 piece in Reform magazine, his approach in preparation for that event was: "Be so challenging that they go out and kill for you". He called his collection, which featured black velvet dresses stretched into geometric shapes, "Open Doors," a subtle jab at the Soviet authorities who had granted him permission to attend in an attempt to demonstrate their openness. It was extremely well-received, bringing him fame in the Western world. In 1990, fellow artist Gábor Szerényi reported his "patriotic pride" at seeing Király featured and advertised "in capital letters" by Vogue México.

Király lacked the credentials to be officially registered as an artist, complicating his career. For one of his fashion shows, he used a rejection letter from the Hungarian Arts Fund as the poster. Király was poor during the 1980s, scraping by through commissioned work and borrowing money from friends; however, he held many parties. Friends described him as kind and sociable; his surname, which translates to "king", resulted in his cult following, consolidated in or around 1986, being labeled as "royalism" (királyizmus). His devotees greeted him with a related pun: Éljen a Király! ("Long live the King!").

=== 1989 and after ===
Király with a model wearing a hat resembling the dome of the Hungarian Parliament Building in 1989

Király's performance art was awarded public visibility during 1989, the year when communism ended in Hungary. In June or July 1989, before the full transition to a market economy, Király designed a hat resembling the dome of the Hungarian Parliament Building and photographed himself with a model wearing it in view of the building. He was stopped and questioned by the national police, but was not arrested as they were unsure how to interpret the message of the outfit and he was not violating any law. The regime change presented Király with other travel opportunities. In June 1990, his "Animal's Dreams" (part of a trilogy) was presented as an opening act for a Hungarian rock show at Melkweg of Amsterdam. Between 1989 and 1992, he presented no catwalk shows in his native country; from as early as 1987, he had refused to sell his creations through any boutique business.

Király's focus was on art events and stable exhibits. In December 1990, at NA-NE Gallery on Pest's Lónyay Street, he exhibited work from the previous decade alongside architects and designers—including Gábor Bachman, Giorgio Soss, and János Czalbert-Halasi. Király had opened his own workshop in Józsefváros, and, as Szerényi notes, used it as a "base from which corridors lead to the wider world." He had by then embarked on a series of collaborations with "hundreds of actors", as well as his own artist friends—János Gasner, Péter Sziámi Müller, János Vető, and the members of Balkán Tourist. Throughout the 1990s, he rejected travel offers, preferring instead to stay in Budapest and pursue smaller, less commercialized projects. During early 1992, Király, alongside Marianna Pádé and István Ocztos, submitted a project to have Chain Bridge tunnel transformed into a fashion runway for that year's World No Tobacco Day. According to legend, American avant-garde guru Allen Ginsberg promised to contribute a poem for the event, if it ever took place (which it did not).

Király still enjoyed success, and in 1998 his hometown of Gyöngyös made him president of the local fashion show (he awarded top prize to a designer who had reused a car tarpaulin). In the 2000s, he returned with costumes for hair shows in London and elsewhere. In August 2001, he and fellow designer Krisztián Prokob produced a show for the Sziget Festival on Hajógyári Island. In May 2005, Király arranged for one of his fashion shows to be hosted by Mátra Cultural Center in Gyöngyös. Critic József Keresztesi gave it a positive review, arguing that Király's feat was outstanding in itself: "Anyone who spent his childhood in a small town is aware of the risk of returning." The costumes presented were "pictures, very consciously selected, to intense musical accompaniment." That same year, fellow designer Kati Zoób referred to Király as "perhaps the greatest talent in domestic fashion design", noting that he still would not "sell clothes". He reportedly made most of his income from his costume design and from selling tickets to a worldwide audience of "Király fans". In 2007, critic Zoltán Hegyi made a similar observation: "[Király is] the Hungarian underground fashion designer. The mainstream would take him, but he wants no part of it."

== Style ==
Journalist and radio producer Avery Trufelman has described Király's coutoure as "outlandish," "decadent," and "campy." As noted in 1993 by critic Judit Acsay, Király had repeatedly explained that, "despite all appearances, his art is not about the clothes." He instead referred to his garments as "clothing sculptures". These were constructed out of found material, including fishing rope and kitchen supplies. His muse Judit Gyüre, who also worked on the dressmaking process, recalled: "I didn't just have to sew, I had to connect a wide variety of materials: plastic with metal, textile with dry bread. This unleashed enormous creativity in me, since Tamás only informed me of what he wanted, but we enjoyed artistic freedom all the way from there." Also a model, she recalled "standing in Tamás's bathtub covered in plaster from head to toe, waiting for him to bind me".

Curator Gyula Musckovics characterized Király's work as anti-political, existing in a parallel realm not directly in opposition to the political one. He was tolerated by the communist authorities despite flouting norms of socialist fashion good taste of the era. Several of his creations employed communist iconography, including a 1987 dress that folded out to resemble the Red Star. Such works were additionally infused with queer aesthetics; though Király was married with children, he may have been pansexual. In a 2020 piece, artist Eszter Ágnes Szabó drew attention to Az Emberevő szerelme as being quintessentially "camp", and thus naturally suited to Király's "entire creative career". Szabó sees its usage of electric blue as one of the "almost mandatory references" to David Bowie, who had a cult status in the Hungarian underground, adding: "Bowie embodied almost everything that was opposed to the Hungarian official culture of the time". "No one could tell what statement Király was exactly making," Trufelman said of the parliamentary hat of 1989. "Was it a joke? Was it a political protest? Was it quite simply just a cool hat?" By contrast, Reform magazine claimed that the item had been designed as part of a publicity stunt for its independent journalism: "Although Tamás Király claims to be apolitical, he still designed a parliamentary fur hat for Reform".

In the early 1990s, the artistic relevancy of Király and NA-NE was seen by author György Szegő as threatened: "The question now is what will happen after the political opposition of the avant-garde is no longer needed. Or is it?" Art historian József Vadas reported on NA-NE's "big surprise"—namely, that all its affiliates, including Király, were taking direct inspiration from Cubo-Futurism and other currents of the early-20th-century Russian avant-garde. One of Király's exhibits, showcased in 1992–1993 at Székesfehérvár, was panned by Acsay: "[His designs] are only shocking, interesting and strange if someone happens to call them clothes. Without this intentionally false label, the effect is considerably smaller and, what's more, highly doubtful", she wrote. "Tamás Király is much less convincing as a [fashion] designer than as a visual designer and choreographer."

== Death and legacy ==
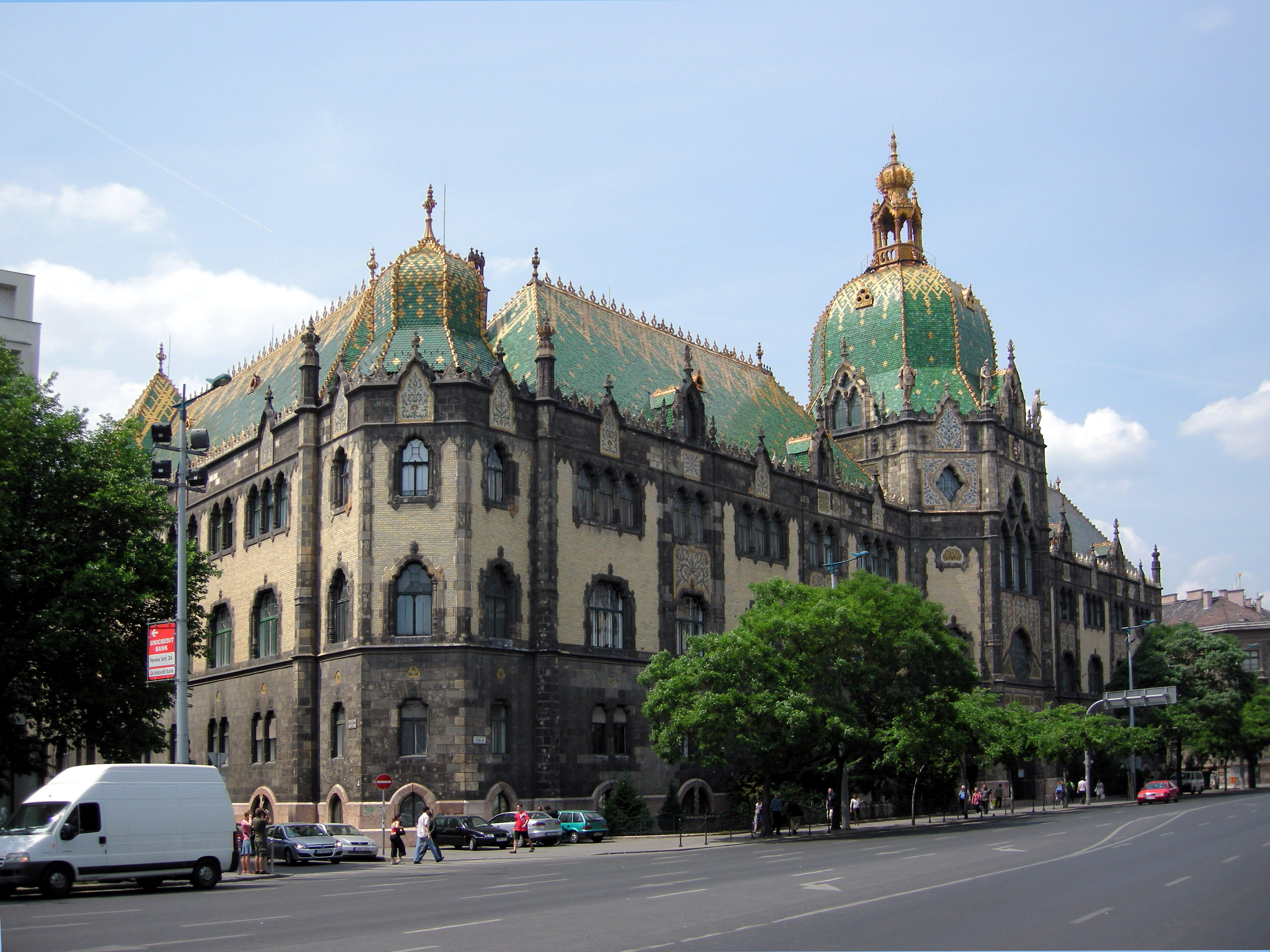
The Museum of Applied Arts in Budapest, where Király's surviving designs are stored

Király was murdered on 7 April 2013, after an argument broke out between him and a man with whom he was possibly having a sexual encounter. According to initial reports, the man strangled him and then robbed his home. In February 2014, shortly before sentencing, the murder weapon was revealed to have been a silk scarf, with authorities choosing not to disclose the motive; one report, ultimately sourced to RTL, alleged that the murderer had been diagnosed as schizophrenic. Court records identified him as "József L.", who "lives by loitering and sometimes prostitutes himself". He allegedly "testified that the fashion designer, upon learning that he was homeless, had invited him to sleep at his place."

As Trufelman notes, public perception of Király's works was negatively influenced by a hostile 2013 documentary that aired on TV2 and portrayed him as insane, and by coverage of his death that emphasized its scandalous aspects. The academic world took greater interest in his works after a 2014 exhibition at the art gallery Tranzit.hu, which was followed by a 2019 retrospective at the Ludwig Museum in Budapest. In July of that year, a "mini-exhibit", focusing on Király's private life, was opened at Pizzica Pizza restaurant in Terézváros. Its organizers were the designer's son, Iliasz, alongside writer György Kozma and radio personality Tivadar Krausz. Trufelman profiled Király in a 2023 episode of her podcast about fashion, Articles of Interest, examining him as an example of fashion transcending capitalism. According to Trufelman, the difficulty of classifying Király's work, as well as lingering censorship of Hungarian arts institutions, has hampered efforts to preserve his legacy. His surviving designs are kept by the Museum of Applied Arts in Budapest, as part of its collections, though many were reportedly stored in poor condition as of 2023.

== Bibliography ==
- Trufelman, Avery (5 July 2023). "Fashion Without Capitalism". Articles of Interest (Podcast).
