= Franky Carrillo =

American politician

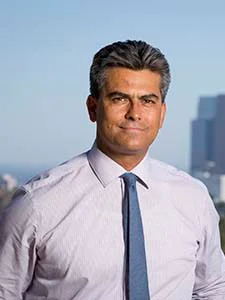

Personal details
- Born: Francisco Carrillo Jr. Los Angeles, California, U.S.
- Party: Democratic
- Children: 3
- Education: Loyola Marymount University
- Known for: Wrongfully convicted of murder
- Website: https://frankycarrillo.com/

Francisco "Franky" Carrillo Jr. is an American politician, who was wrongfully convicted of the 1991 murder of Donald Sarpy and served twenty years in prison before his conviction was reversed by the Los Angeles County Superior Court on March 14, 2011. A member of the Democratic Party, Carrillo currently serves on the Los Angeles County Probation Oversight Commission.

== Wrongful murder conviction ==
Carrillo's conviction relied on eyewitness testimony from six people. The witnesses later admitted they did not have a view of the shooter, and instead had been influenced by police officers, and each other, to identify Carrillo. Two men have since confessed to the crime, and stated Carrillo was not involved.

Although always professing his innocence, Carrillo was found guilty at his second trial after his initial trial resulted in a hung jury, and subsequent appeals. After Carrillo's case was taken on by Ellen Eggers, the Northern California Innocence Project, and attorneys from Morrison & Foerster, LLP, he was able to conclusively prove his innocence.

Carrillo's story has twice been featured on the podcast Strangers by Lea Thau. His story is also told in the Netflix series The Innocence Files.

== Career ==
While in prison for a crime for which he was later exonerated, Carrillo worked several jobs and learned multiple trades: teacher’s aide, counselor’s clerk, Braille transcriber, youth diversion counselor, auto mechanic, dietitian, physical therapy assistant, and many other skilled professions.

He served as an elected member and former chair of the Democratic Central Committee, where he co-chaired the Judicial Interview Committee.

As an environmental advocate, Carrillo was a proponent of Measure A, the critical L.A. County parks and water bond measure that passed in 2016, because it provided funding for open space and improvements first and foremost in the communities that needed it most – marginalized neighborhoods. Franky also publicly supported Measure W, the 2018 Safe Clean Water Act for L.A. County, which according to a recent report helped divert 96 billion gallons of urban runoff from recent rainy season to recharge our water table instead of flowing into the ocean.

Working closely with state legislative members of both houses and with stakeholders deeply devoted to social justice, Carrillo supported and testified in committees for Senate Bill-9 Juvenile LWOP resentencing, Senate Bill-260/261youthful offender parole hearing, Senate Bill-923 (eye witness bill), Assembly Bill-1987 (post conviction discovery materials), Senate Bill-336 (Reentry services available to exonerees), Senate Bill-980 (which improves access to physical and biological evidence), Senate Bill-1058 (to expand false testimony claim to include outdated scientific testimony), and Assembly Bill-454 (which exempts wrongfully convicted individuals from paying state income tax on compensation).

Carrillo has been a big advocate for youth. Including his work on closing of the Eastlake juvenile hall, one of the oldest problematic juvenile halls in the state of California. Franky Carrillo also helped in establish the Franky Carrillo Teen Court, a widely recognized alternative to the L.A. County Superior Court. Carrillo Teen Court is designed to empower students by educating them on the law, the power of their voice, and the courtroom process.

Carrillo founded a nonprofit, The Restorative Project, which hosts formerly incarcerated individuals on an open, natural ranch to help them adjust to being free—and being in the natural environment is crucial to healing, especially when people are spending more and more time online. He currently serves at the Chief Advisor to the Innocence Project and Special Advisor to the California Innocence Advocates.

In April 2021, Carrillo was selected by the Los Angeles County Board of Supervisors to serve as the Chair of the Leadership Team of the county's Probation Oversight Commission.

In April 2023, Carrillo announced his candidacy in the 2024 elections to represent California's 27th congressional district in the U.S. House of Representatives. He withdrew from the race in October 2023.

=== 2024 California State Assembly race ===
In October 2023, Carrillo launched a campaign for the California State Assembly in District 52. He finished second behind Democrat Jessica Caloza in the primary election on March 5, 2024. Carrillo lost to Caloza in the general election of November 5, 2024, receiving 53,820 votes to Caloza’s 108,882.

== Personal life ==
Carrillo has three children.
