= Millennials (disambiguation) =

Millennials are the generational demographic cohort typically defined as those born between 1981 and 1996, sometimes known as Generation Y.

Millennial or millennials may also refer to:

- Relating to a millennium, a period of one thousand years
- Millennialism, a set of beliefs advanced by some religious denominations
- Millennial Media, advertising company founded May 2006 in Baltimore
- Millennial (blog), Catholic young adult journal begun in 2012
- Millennial (podcast), created by Megan Tan in 2015
- Millennials (TV series), Argentine telenovela begun in November 2018
- Millennials (musical), a 2019 musical by Elliot Clay

== See also ==
- Generation Y (disambiguation)
- Millenarianism
