= Everything Is Alive =

Everything Is Alive may refer to:

- Everything Is Alive (podcast), a podcast produced by Radiotopia
- Everything Is Alive (album), a 2023 album by Slowdive
- Everything Is Alive, a 2011 album by Hank Roberts

== See also ==
- Everything Is Alive, Everything Is Breathing, Nothing Is Dead, and Nothing Is Bleeding, a 2004 studio album by The Chariot
