= Megapolis =

Megapolis is a variant of the word megalopolis, meaning a large city or urban area.

Megapolis may also refer to:

- Megapolis (game), a game developed by Social Quantum
- Ministry of Megapolis, a cabinet of the prime minister in Sri Lanka.
- Megapolis Festival, an annual audio arts festival in the United States
- Megapolis (passenger train), a passenger train in Russia
- Megapolis Zoo, the home of fictional cartoon character Tennessee Tuxedo

== See also ==
- Our Lady of Darkness, a 1977 book, by Fritz Leiber, that contains a description of 'Megapolisomancy', a fictional occult science.
