= Generation Yes (disambiguation) =

Generation Yes was a group in Ireland that was active in promoting the country's European Union (EU) membership.

Generation Yes may also refer to:

- Generation YES (Youth and Educators Succeeding), a U.S. organization that works to improve education for underserved students
- Generation Yes (Scotland), a campaign for a yes vote among young voters in the 2014 referendum on Scottish independence

== See also ==
- Generation Y (disambiguation)
