= Nancy (podcast) =

LGBTQ+ podcast

- Genre: LGBTQ news: analysis, commentary, features, interviews, specials
- Language: English

Cast and voices
- Hosted by: Kathy Tu; Tobin Low

Music
- Theme music composed by: Alex Overington

Production
- Production: Matt Collette, Jeremy S. Bloom, Jenny Lawton, Zakiya Gibbons, BA Parker

Technical specifications
- Audio format: Podcast (via streaming or downloadable MP3)

Publication
- No. of seasons: 5
- No. of episodes: 111
- Original release: April 9, 2017 – June 29, 2020
- Provider: WNYC Studios
- Updates: Weekly

Related
- Website: wnycstudios.org/shows/nancy

Nancy was a weekly podcast produced by WNYC Studios. It was hosted by Kathy Tu and Tobin Low. The first episode debuted on April 9, 2017. The show's last episode was aired on June 29, 2020. The series features a range of topics exploring the LGBTQ experience.

== List of episodes ==
=== List of Nancy episodes ===
| Title | Date | Notes | Citations |
|---|---|---|---|
| "Hello, Hello" | April 9, 2017 | Kathy and Tobin recount how they came out to their families. | |
| "Like Two Ken Dolls Being Smashed Together" | April 10, 2017 | | |
| "I Had No Idea" | April 17, 2017 | featuring Shakina Nayfack | |
| "The Elephant in the Room" | April 23, 2017 | about LGBT Republicans | |
| "There Are No Gay Wizards" | April 30, 2017 | about Albus Dumbledore | |
| "Here's What It's Like" | May 6, 2017 | | |
| "Fear of Being Butch" | May 14, 2017 | | |
| "The Coolest Lesbian Ever" | May 16, 2017 | | |
| "Thank You For Being a Friend" | May 21, 2017 | featuring Rufus Wainwright and Saeed Jones | |
| "Dear Nancy" | May 28, 2017 | | |
| "You've Told Me This Before" | June 4, 2017 | featuring Asia Kate Dillon and Tina Healy | |
| "Everything Changed" | June 11, 2017 | about the 2016 Orlando nightclub shooting | |
| "It's Really You" | June 18, 2017 | | |
| "Kathy Goes to Camp" | June 25, 2017 | | |
| "Q is Growing Up" | July 16, 2017 | | |
| "Let's Talk About Trump's Trans Ban" | July 27, 2017 | | |
| "RuPaul Wants Naked People and Big, Fat Asses" | July 30, 2017 | | |
| "The Swimsuit Issue" | August 20, 2017 | | |
| "The Pentagon's Secret Gaggle of Gays" | August 22, 2017 | | |
| "My Brother and Me" | August 27, 2017 | featuring Nore Davis and Patti Harrison | |
| "Multiple Lesbians in Any Scenario" | September 3, 2017 | about The L-Word | |
| "Does Your Boss Know You're Gay?" | September 10, 2017 | | |
| "I See You, I Love You" | September 17, 2017 | featuring Gabe Dunn, Allison Raskin, and Vivek Shraya | |
| "Somewhat Out" | September 24, 2017 | featuring Chirlane McCray and Rich Bellis | |
| "Will and Grace Are Back! (But Should They Be?)" | September 28, 2017 | featuring Alex Jung | |
| "Different in Two Ways" | October 1, 2017 | featuring Ryan Haddad | |
| "Oliver Sipple" | October 3, 2017 | featuring Latif Nasser and Tracie Hunte | |
| "Tegan & Sara & Abby & Josh" | October 8, 2017 | featuring Tegan & Sara | |
| "Absence Of" | October 15, 2017 | | |
| "This Awful Side of Me" | October 22, 2017 | | |
| "Out at Work" | October 29, 2017 | | |
| "Lena Waithe's Superpowers" | November 12, 2017 | featuring Lena Waithe | |
| "Kathy's Mom is Uncomfortable With All This" | November 19, 2017 | rerun | |
| "Return to Ring of Keys" | December 3, 2017 | rerun | |
| "A Gaggle for Me" | April 15, 2018 | | |
| "Punks" | April 22, 2018 | featuring Kai Wright | |
| "Gaggle Update: We're Here to Make Friends" | April 25, 2018 | | |
| "Shamir Bailey Hates Your Favorite Shamir Song" | April 29, 2018 | featuring Shamir | |
| "Michelle Buteau Is Straight But We Love Her Anyway" | May 1, 2018 | featuring Michelle Buteau, Matteo Lane, and Nico Tortorella | |
| "The Rowan County Clerk" | May 6, 2018 | | |
| "DilDOs and DilDON'Ts" | May 13, 2018 | featuring Gabe Gonzalez and Buck Angel | |
| "You're Not a 'Bad Gay'" | May 20, 2018 | featuring John Paul Brammer | |
| "We Can Be Friends" | May 27, 2018 | | |
| "Poor Unfortunate Souls" | June 3, 2018 | featuring Meredith Talusan, Dan Kois, Isaac Butler, and Andrea Bernstein | |
| "Cameron Esposito is Reclaiming Rape Jokes" | June 7, 2018 | featuring Cameron Esposito | |
| "Peppermint 2020" | June 10, 2018 | featuring Peppermint | |
| "Take the Long Way Home" | June 17, 2018 | featuring Katie Schlecter | |
| "Cumming to America" | June 24, 2018 | featuring Alan Cumming, Patti O'Furniture, and Lewis Wallace | |
| "Five Simple Steps" | June 29, 2018 | | |
| "Perfect Son" | September 24, 2018 | featuring Jason Kim | |
| "Closest I Get" | October 1, 2018 | featuring Katie Herzig | |
| "Where We Were Then, Where We Are Now" | October 8, 2018 | featuring Judy Shepard (mother of Matthew Shepard), Moisés Kaufman, and Samira Wiley | |
| "You've Been Meaning to Tell Us" | October 15, 2018 | rerun | |
| "The First Queer Woman in Congress" | October 22, 2018 | about Jeannette Rankin; featuring Kai Wright and Mara Silvers | |
| "We Can't Be Erased" | October 26, 2018 | | |
| "Definitely, Maybe" | October 29, 2018 | featuring Dee Rogers, Kasey Suffredini, David Broockman, and Kelly Jenkins | |
| "Emma Gonzalez Wants You to Vote" | November 5, 2018 | featuring X Gonzalez and Bria Smith | |
| "Jill Soloway's 'Transparent' Reckoning" | November 12, 2018 | featuring Joey Soloway | |
| "Alexandra Billings Won't Stay Quiet Anymore" | November 13, 2018 | featuring Alexandra Billings | |
| "I've Been Meaning to Tell You" | November 19, 2018 | featuring Dylan Marron and Glenn Marron | |
| "X & Y" | November 26, 2018 | featuring an episode of Radiolab Presents: Gonads | |
| "Coming Out, Coming Forward" | December 3, 2018 | | |
| "Bowen Yang Was Fooled By Grey's Anatomy" | December 10, 2018 | featuring Bowen Yang | |
| "You Couldn't Say It Was Wrong" | December 17, 2018 | | |
| "God + The Gays" | December 24, 2018 | featuring Phoebe Wang | |
| "A Gaggle Resolution" | December 31, 2018 | rerun | |
| "Mr. LA Leather" | January 7, 2019 | featuring James Kim and Pup Yoshi | |
| "Love Song" | January 14, 2019 | featuring Daniel A. Smith and Myosha Gross | |
| "Nancy Takes the Stage" | January 21, 2019 | featuring Jes Tom and John Paul Brammer | |
| "The League of Extraordinary Trolls" | January 28, 2019 | originally aired on Endless Thread | |
| "Phillip Picardi: Out with the Old" | February 4, 2019 | featuring Phillip Picardi | |
| "The Case of the Cutoffs" | February 11, 2019 | featuring Ben Riskin | |
| "The Word 'Queer'" | February 18, 2019 | featuring Helen Zaltzman, Eric Marcus, and Amy Sueyoshi, with cameo appearances from Katie Mingle from 99% Invisible, Katie Herzog from The Stranger, and Jonathan Van Ness from Queer Eye | |
| "Queer Money Matters" | February 24, 2019 | | |
| "Queer Money Fear$" | February 25, 2019 | featuring Lee Badgett | |
| "Babies and Bills" | March 4, 2019 | | |
| "The Gayly Grind" | March 5, 2019 | | |
| "For Richer, For Poorer" | March 6, 2019 | | |
| "Dude, Where's My Coverage?" | March 7, 2019 | | |
| "The Golden Queers" | March 8, 2019 | | |
| "A Private Life" | March 18, 2019 | originally aired on This is Love | |
| "David and Dominique" | March 25, 2019 | rerun | |
| "Masha Gessen's Y2K" | April 1, 2019 | | |
| "Does It Bring You Joy?" | April 8, 2019 | featuring Dr. Christie Block, Jacob Tobia, Henry Bae, and Shaobo Han | |
| "The Cowboy of the West Village" | April 15, 2019 | about Storme DeLarverie | |
| "Desiree Akhavan's The Bisexual" | April 22, 2019 | featuring Desiree Akhavan | |
| "Natalie Diaz Talks Love and Basketball" | April 29, 2019 | featuring Natalie Diaz | |
| "The Nancy Variety Show!" | May 6, 2019 | | |
| "100% Science, 100% Magic" | May 13, 2019 | featuring Kristin Russo | |
| "When Tobin Met Kathy" | May 20, 2019 | | |
| "Taiwan!" | May 27, 2019 | | |
| "Sex Educated" | June 3, 2019 | | |
| "The Day of Epiphany" | June 10, 2019 | | |
| "When They Win" | June 17, 2019 | | |
| "What Do We Have in Common?" | June 24, 2019 | about the 50th anniversary of the Stonewall riots | |
| "Chani Nicholas + Joel Kim Booster" | December 30, 2019 | featuring Chani Nicholas and Joel Kim Booster | |
| "It's Mother Fudging BD Wong!" | January 6, 2020 | featuring BD Wong | |
| "The L Word is Back" | January 13, 2020 | rerun of "Multiple Lesbians in Any Scenario" | |
| "Dress of Choice" | March 9, 2020 | featuring Desmond is Amazing, Ophelia Peaches, and Jessica L'Whor | |
| "Chella Man + Rebecca Sugar" | March 23, 2020 | featuring Chella Man and Rebecca Sugar | |
| "Nancy Checks In" | March 27, 2020 | | |
| "Give Me a Sign" | April 6, 2020 | | |
| "Make Australia Gay Again" | April 20, 2020 | about the Gay and Lesbian Kingdom of the Coral Sea Islands | |
| "InvestiGAYtions!" | May 6, 2020 | | |
| "Carmen Maria Machado's Queer Horror Stories" | May 18, 2020 | featuring Carmen Maria Machado | |
| "Samantha Irby + Brandon Taylor" | June 1, 2020 | featuring Samantha Irby and Brandon Taylor | |
| "Black Trans Lives Matter" | June 11, 2020 | | |
| "All the Fine Girls Be There" | June 22, 2020 | featuring Leilah Weinraub, Ronnie D. Ron, and Egypt Blaque Knyle | |
| "Nancy Was Here" | June 29, 2020 | series finale | |

== See also ==
- List of LGBT podcasts
