= Radiotopia =

Podcast network on Public Radio Exchange

- Type: Podcast
- Country: United States
- First air date: February 1, 2014
- Availability: Global
- Founded: Oakland, California
- Key people: Roman Mars, Julie Shapiro
- Affiliation: Public Radio Exchange
- Official website: www.radiotopia.fm

Radiotopia is a podcast network founded by Roman Mars (host of 99% Invisible) and run by the Public Radio Exchange. The network is organized as a collective of some two dozen shows whose producers have complete artistic control over their work. Since its launch, podcasts in the network have been downloaded over 19 million times per month.

== History ==
Radiotopia, founded by Roman Mars, was launched in February 2014 with an initial group of seven shows: Jonathan Mitchell's The Truth, Lea Thau's Strangers, Benjamin Walker's Theory of Everything, Nick van der Kolk's Love and Radio, the Kitchen Sisters' Fugitive Waves (later renamed The Kitchen Sisters Present), Radio Diaries, and Roman Mars' own flagship show 99% Invisible. Without the support of traditional radio broadcasting, these independent producers banded together to instead target a growing audience of podcast listeners.

The podcast network was initially supported by a US$200,000 injection from the John S. and James L. Knight Foundation. The network is run by the Public Radio Exchange (PRX) who described it as "somewhat like an independent record label". In October 2014 a Kickstarter campaign was started to support the growth of the network; it raised over US$600,000, making it the most-funded radio or podcast project on the site. This money allowed the network to expand, as well as add four new shows. In May 2015, the network received a further US$1 million from the Knight Foundation to fund more shows. In September of that year, Julie Shapiro was hired as Radiotopia's executive producer.

Around the time of Radiotopia's launch, the network's podcasts received around 900,000 downloads per month. This figure increased to 7.5 million by May 2015, 8.5 million in September 2015, 13 million as of June 2016, and more than 19 million times by the end of 2019. Within its first year, Radiotopia grew from seven to eleven shows, adding The Heart (formerly Audio Smut), Phoebe Judge's Criminal, Helen Zaltzman's The Allusionist, and The Mortified Podcast based on the popular international stage show and documentary series. Within the company's second year, Radiotopia adopted Hrishikesh Hirway's Song Exploder and Nate DeMeo's The Memory Palace from the Maximum Fun network, as well as Megan Tan's show Millennial; it has continued to add new shows to its roster ever since.

== Podcasts ==
=== Current shows ===
Radiotopia members include the following podcasts:

Title	Host(s)	Genre	First episode aired
Adult-ISH	Nyge Turner and Merk Nguyen	Society and culture	Aug 14, 2019
Articles of Interest	Avery Trufelman	Clothing	Dec 8, 2018
Ear Hustle	Earlonne Woods, Antwan Williams, Nigel Poor	Storytelling	Jun 14, 2017
Everything is Alive	Ian Chillag	Unscripted Fiction	Jul 16, 2018
The Heart	Kaitlin Prest	Love stories	Jan 1, 2015
Hyperfixed	Alex Goldman	Problem-solving	October 2, 2024
The Kitchen Sisters Present	The Kitchen Sisters	Storytelling	Feb 3, 2014
The Memory Palace	Nate DiMeo	History	Nov 12, 2008
Mortified	Dave Nadelberg, Neil Katcher	First-person stories	Feb 5, 2015
Normal Gossip	Kelsey McKinney	Conversation	Jan 5, 2022
Oprahdemics: The Study of the Queen of Talk	Kellie Carter Jackson, Leah Wright Rigueur	Popular history	Mar 23, 2022
Passenger List	Kelly Marie Tran	Fiction	Sep 16, 2019
Radio Diaries	Joe Richman	First-person stories	May 16, 2013
Showcase	Multiple	Anthology	Aug 4, 2017
Song Exploder	Hrishikesh Hirway	Music	Jan 1, 2014
Theory of Everything	Benjamen Walker	Conversation	Apr 19, 2013
This Day	Jody Avirgan, Nicole Hemmer, Kellie Carter Jackson	Political history	Mar 31, 2020
ZigZag	Manoush Zomorodi, Jen Poyant	Business documentary	Jun 14, 2018

==== Adult-ISH ====
Adult-ISH features interviews, storytelling and advice by and for people in their 20s. Hosts Nyge Turner and Merk Nguyen highlight topics central to their own lives, such as mental health, professional goals, personal identity, music, and relationships. The show debuted in 2018 through YR Media and partnered with Radiotopia for its second season.

==== Articles of Interest ====
Avery Trufelman's podcast Articles of Interest is about clothing, fashion, and power. Originally a miniseries appearing on 99% Invisible's podcast feed, it was given its own feed in December 2018 and publicly announced in March 2019. Its debut season put Articles of Interest on many best-podcast-of-the-year lists, including that of the BBC, Vulture, and The New Yorker. Its third season focuses on American ivy, and was highlighted in The New York Times' best-of-year list.

==== Ear Hustle ====
Ear Hustle is a podcast about life inside prison, produced by two inmates at San Quentin State Prison, Earlonne Woods and Antwan Williams, together with Nigel Poor, a Bay Area artist who volunteers at San Quentin. The show beat out 1,536 other entries to win Podquest – a 2016 contest organized by Radiotopia for new podcast ideas. The term "ear hustle" is prison slang for eavesdropping or being nosy. On November 21, 2018, Earlonne Woods' sentence was commuted, with Ear Hustle cited as a significant contributor to his reformation.

==== Everything is Alive ====
Everything is Alive is an unscripted interview show in which the host, Ian Chillag, interviews an actor inhabiting the role of a different inanimate object each episode. Interview "subjects" in the first season included a can of generic cola, a bar of soap, and a mousetrap. These interviews are punctuated by conversations between Chillag and a real person that further explore topics touched upon in the main interview. Before joining Radiotopia, Chillag was a producer on NPR's Wait Wait... Don't Tell Me! and Fresh Air, and had previously co-hosted the now-defunct podcast How to Do Everything.

==== The Heart ====
The Heart originally aired in Canada under the name Audio Smut. It changed its name when moving to Radiotopia in 2015. On December 8, 2017, it was announced that The Heart would not be producing new shows in 2018. After December 2017, the show took a hiatus while its producers made a serialized fiction podcast called The Shadows for the CBC in 2018. In 2019 producer Kaitlin Prest announced the founding of a new audio arts production company, Mermaid Palace, that will make shows in partnership with Radiotopia and the CBC, including a new season of The Heart, which launched in January 2020.

==== Hyperfixed ====
Hyperfixed is a podcast hosted by Alex Goldman. Each episode, Goldman and staff try to solve a listener-submitted question, ranging in seriousness from minor curiosity to major life decision.

==== The Kitchen Sisters Present ====
The Kitchen Sisters Present is a podcast produced by Davia Nelson and Nikki Silva, who are collectively known as the Kitchen Sisters. They have had long careers in radio production, with shows like Hidden Kitchens, Lost & Found Sound, and The Hidden World of Girls. Their podcast, then called Fugitive Waves, was one of the founding members of Radiotopia. In it they present pieces from their archive of stories built up over their careers, which they describe as "stories from the flip side of history".

==== The Memory Palace ====
The Memory Palace is a monthly historical podcast hosted by Nate DiMeo. The Memory Palace moved to Radiotopia from the Maximum Fun network in 2016.

==== Mortified ====
Mortified is a podcast based on the popular stage show of the same name. Both the podcast and the original show feature adults sharing things they wrote as teenagers, such as diaries, letters, and poems, that now seem embarrassing in retrospect. The show was started in Los Angeles by David Nadelberg in 2005, whence it spread to other cities. Nadelberg also turned the show into the book Mortified: Real Words. Real People. Real Pathetic. Together with Neil Katcher, he also created a documentary series, The Mortified Sessions, that ran on Sundance Channel for two seasons in 2011 and 2012, and a 2013 documentary movie, Mortified Nation. The podcast, which was also created by Nadelberg and Katcher, joined Radiotopia in 2015. Celebrity guests who have appeared on the Mortified podcast include Elijah Wood, Kate Micucci, Chvrches, Alison Brie, Alanis Morissette, and Busy Philipps.

==== Normal Gossip ====
Normal Gossip is a conversation podcast co-produced by Defector Media, hosted by Kelsey McKinney and produced by Alex Sujong Laughlin. Each episode explores an anonymized story of interpersonal drama alongside a celebrity guest.

==== Oprahdemics: The Study of the Queen of Talk ====
Each week, historians and longtime friends Kellie Carter Jackson and Leah Wright Rigueur dive deep into the cultural significance and contributions of The Oprah Winfrey Show. Discussion topics have included diets, the 1992 Los Angeles riots, Tyler Perry, Toni Morrison, and Oprah's Book Club.

==== Passenger List ====
A serialized fiction podcast starring Kelly Marie Tran in which a plane has disappeared mid-flight between London and New York with 256 passengers on board. Tran plays Kaitlin Le, a college student on a quest to discover the truth behind the missing aircraft. The first eight-episode season ran in the fall of 2019. A second season launched on May 10, 2021.

==== Radio Diaries ====
Radio Diaries Inc. is a production company started by Joe Richman in 1996. Richman and his staff give everyday people a tape recorder and ask them to record their daily lives, which is then edited to create an episode-length story. Richman's pieces have appeared on NPR's All Things Considered, and This American Life, and on BBC Radio. In 2013, Richman started the Radio Diaries podcast, as a showcase for his pieces. The podcast later became one of the founding members of Radiotopia.

==== Radiotopia Plus ====
In 2018 Radiotopia created a short-form exclusive podcast for its financial supporters. Each episode of Radiotopia Plus poses a question that each of the network's show hosts and producers answer.

==== Radiotopia Presents ====
In 2017 Radiotopia launched a podcast feed under the name Showcase after putting out an open call for new podcast proposals. From over 1,500 entries, four were chosen to run as limited series with weekly episodes all sharing the same podcast feed. After a successful run, four more limited series were chosen in 2018. In 2020 the feed was renamed Radiotopia Presents.

The series broadcast so far have been:

- Summer 2017: Damon Krukowski's six-episode treatise Ways of Hearing about how humans listen to music.
- Fall 2017: The Polybius Conspiracy, a fiction podcast about Polybius and other urban legends.
- Winter 2018: Secrets by Swedish producers Mohamed El Abed, Martin Johnson, and Åsa Secher, about the secrets people keep.
- Spring 2018: Errthang, by Al Letson and Willie Evans Jr. This is the second season of the podcast – the first season ran as an independent show.
- Summer 2018: The Great God of Depression by Karen Brown and Pagan Kennedy, a five-episode documentary about the author William Styron and his neurologist Alice Flaherty.
- Fall 2018: The Stoop, by Leila Day and Hana Baba, a four-episode series about stories regarding African Americans.
- Winter 2019: Spacebridge, by Julia Barton and Charles Maynes, a four-episode documentary about U.S.–Soviet Space Bridge.
- 2021: Blind Guy Travels by Matthew Shifrin, a 6-episode documentary about the experience of blindness.
- 2021: S***hole Country by Afia Kaakyire, an 8-episode memoir about her Ghanaian-American immigrant family.
- 2022: a hit dog will holler by Inda Craig-Galván, a 4-episode fiction drama about an African-American political podcaster facing backlash.
- 2022: My Mother Made Me by Jason Reynolds, a 4-episode memoir about his mother.
- 2023: Bot Love by Anna Oakes and Diego Senior, a 7-episode documentary about companion chatbots such as Replika and Woebot.
- 2024: Shocking, Heartbreaking, Transformative by Jess Shane, a 4-episode documentary about making documentaries.
- 2025: Red for Revolution by Jana Naomi Smith, a 6-episode fiction drama about queer Black women facing homophobia in 1971 and in the present day.
- 2025: We're Doing The Wiz by Ian Coss and Sakina Ibrahim, a 4-episode documentary memoir about racial tensions in 2004 at Pioneer Valley Performing Arts aggravated by a historical impersonation contest and about the school's subsequent decision to stage the 1970s soul musical The Wiz.

==== Song Exploder ====
Song Exploder is a biweekly music podcast hosted and produced by Hrishikesh Hirway. The show features musicians talking about the creative process behind an individual song while "deconstructing" the song into its component parts. The podcast launched on the Maximum Fun network, went independent in February 2015, and joined Radiotopia in June 2015.

==== Theory of Everything ====
Producer Benjamen Walker ended his WFMU radio show Too Much Information (TMI) to start Theory of Everything as a founding member of Radiotopia. Theory of Everything focuses on stories as they relate to new technologies and shifts in culture, and Walker has used the podcast format to excerpt and serialize old episodes of TMI.

==== This Day ====
Hosted by journalist Jody Avirgan and historians Nicole Hemmer and Kellie Carter Jackson, This Day (formerly This Day in Esoteric Political History) looks back at notable moments in the history of American politics and government for insights on current-day issues and developments.

==== ZigZag ====
ZigZag is the first production by Stable Genius Productions, a startup formed by Manoush Zomorodi, the former host of WNYC's podcast Note to Self, and her colleague Jen Poyant. The show itself is a documentary of the early days of the new company.

=== Former shows ===
Title	Host(s)	Genre	First episode aired	Final episode aired
99% Invisible	Roman Mars	Design	Sep 3, 2010	Ongoing
Appearances	Sharon Mashihi	Memoir	Sep 29, 2020	Oct 27, 2020
Criminal	Phoebe Judge, Lauren Spohrer	Crime stories	Jan 28, 2014	Ongoing
Love + Radio	Nick van der Kolk	Storytelling	Oct 18, 2005	Ongoing
Millennial	Megan Tan	Coming-of-age stories	Jan 16, 2015	Aug 16, 2017
Strangers	Lea Thau	Storytelling	Dec 13, 2012	Ongoing
The Allusionist	Helen Zaltzman	Language	Jan 4, 2015	Ongoing
The Bugle	Andy Zaltzman	Political Satire	Oct 14, 2007	Ongoing
The West Wing Weekly	Hrishikesh Hirway, Joshua Malina	TV discussion	Mar 22, 2016	Jan 29, 2020
This is Love	Phoebe Judge, Lauren Sphohrer	True love stories	Feb 14, 2018	Ongoing
Trump Con Law	Roman Mars, Elizabeth Joh	Law	Jun 7, 2017	Ongoing
Judas and the Black Messiah Podcast	Fred Hampton Jr., Elvis Mitchell	Film	Feb 12, 2021	Mar 12, 2021
The Truth	Jonathan Mitchell	Storytelling	Feb 11, 2012	Jun 14, 2023

==== 99% Invisible ====
99% Invisible is an independently produced radio show created by Roman Mars that focuses on design and architecture. It began as a collaborative project between San Francisco public radio station KALW and the American Institute of Architects in San Francisco. In April 2021 the company that produces the show (99% Invisible Inc.) was acquired by SiriusXM, with 99% Invisible moving to the Stitcher Radio network.

==== Appearances ====
Appearances is a semi-autobiographical podcast by Sharon Mashihi, an audio artist, screenwriter, and story editor, that had a limited run on Radiotopia.

==== Criminal ====
Criminal is an independently produced podcast that focuses on true crime. The show describes itself as telling "stories of people who've done wrong, been wronged, or gotten caught somewhere in the middle". In 2021, Criminal host Phoebe Judge announced the show would move from Radiotopia to Vox Media. Judge attributed the change to a wish to grow the podcast and spend more time on storytelling over business running. The founders expressed gratitude towards Radiotopia in a PRX newsletter. Criminal left alongside This is Love and Phoebe Reads a Mystery.

==== Love + Radio ====
Love and Radio is an American audio podcast directed by Nick van der Kolk and produced by Brendan Baker. It originally began in 2005 as a series of self-distributed episodes, though the show later received some support and distribution from NPR and Chicago Public Media. In 2014, the show joined Radiotopia as one of its seven original members and began producing episodes on a more regular monthly schedule. In 2019, during the mid-season break after completing its 7th season, Love and Radio announced that they would be leaving the ad-supported Radiotopia network to join the subscription-supported podcasting service Luminary, starting with their 8th season in May 2019.

==== Millennial ====
Millennial was a semi-autobiographical podcast created by Megan Tan in 2015, when she graduated from college and was unemployed living with her boyfriend in Portland, Maine. It became part of the Radiotopia network in 2016. The podcast focused on the transition between university and work from the point of view of a person in their twenties. In 2017, Tan decided to end the podcast, and the final episode aired on August 16, 2017, making it the first show on the Radiotopia network to end its run. Tan went on to work as a producer of The Habitat from Gimlet Media.

==== Strangers ====
Strangers is hosted by Danish-born producer Lea Thau. Initially part of KCRW's Independent Producer project, Strangers became a founding member of Radiotopia in 2014. In 2017, Thau decided to leave the network and to continue producing the show independently. The show's last episode on the Radiotopia network aired on December 12, 2017, followed by an unofficial hiatus and a 2019 Patreon-backed revival.

==== The Allusionist ====
The Allusionist is a podcast about the English language. Zaltzman was already the co-host of the Answer Me This! podcast and was looking at the possibility of starting a new podcast focused primarily on English etymology, a subject she was interested in. Roman Mars helped Zaltzman find funding for the podcast, which eventually became The Allusionist, and debuted on the Radiotopia network. Caroline Crampton of New Statesman put it on her list of podcasts of 2016. Zaltzman and the podcast left Radiotopia in October 2020 to free up more resources to address the mostly white line-up at the network.

==== The Bugle ====
The Bugle is a satirical news podcast created by John Oliver and Andy Zaltzman in 2007. Its focus is global news stories, primarily on UK/US news items. Initially produced independently and distributed by TimesOnline, the show was launched in 2007 following John Oliver's move to New York to work on The Daily Show, allowing Oliver and Andy Zaltzman to continue a partnership that had previously enjoyed success with Political Animal and The Department. The show joined Radiotopia in September 2016 after Oliver's departure. In late 2018 Andy Zaltzman announced that The Bugle would leave Radiotopia at the start of 2019.

==== The West Wing Weekly ====
The West Wing Weekly was an American podcast hosted by Hrishikesh Hirway and Joshua Malina, in which the hosts discussed one episode of the popular television program The West Wing, which originally aired on NBC from 1999 to 2006. The podcast featured various cast and crew members including series creator Aaron Sorkin, director Tommy Schlamme, Rob Lowe, Bradley Whitford, Richard Schiff, Janel Moloney, Marlee Matlin, and Dulé Hill, as well as former government officials, academics, and pundits. The podcast finished its run with their discussion of the series' final episode on 29 January 2020.

==== This Is Love ====
This Is Love was launched in 2018 by Phoebe Judge, Lauren Spohrer, and Nadia Wilson—the team behind Criminal, another Radiotopia show. The show ran for a short six-episode season in early 2018, with a second season airing at the end of the same year. As of 2022, it had five seasons. The show tells stories on the subject of love. This is Love left the Radiotopia network in 2021 along with Criminal and Phoebe Reads a Mystery.

==== Trump Con Law ====
Roman Mars and UC Davis School of Law Professor Elizabeth Joh developed the podcast What Trump Can Teach Us About Constitutional Law (often abbreviated as Trump Con Law in conversation and distribution), which was first launched in June 2017 and used the circumstances surrounding then-president Donald Trump to discuss constitutional law in a format accessible to laypersons. The show is now distributed independently of Radiotopia under the title What Roman Mars Can Learn About Con Law.

==== Judas and the Black Messiah Podcast ====
Judas and the Black Messiah Podcast is hosted by Fred Hampton Jr. and Elvis Mitchell and accompanies the film of the same name. The show was produced by Proximity Media and 99% Invisible and in partnership with Warner Bros. The last episode aired March 12, 2021.

==== The Truth ====
The Truth was a biweekly fiction podcast that sought to re-imagine what audio drama is and can be. Stories were developed as a collective where frequently the dialogue was completely improvised. Additionally, recordings were made on location and then taken into the studio to be edited. Work by The Truth has been heard on many nationally syndicated public radio programs, including This American Life, Studio 360, Snap Judgment, and The Story (see Links below).

== Accolades and awards ==
In 2015 Fast Company ranked Radiotopia among the top 10 most innovative Kickstarter companies, and in 2017 as a top 10 innovator in media. Of the 50 best podcasts as ranked by The Atlantic in 2016, eight were part of Radiotopia, and a similar list from The Guardian included five Radiotopia shows. In January 2019, VertitechIT listed ZigZag as one of the Top IT Podcasts of 2019. The network won "Podcast Network of the Year" at the 2019 Adweek Podcast Awards.
