= Articles of Interest =

Narrative podcast about clothing and fashion

- Genre: Documentary
- Format: Audio
- Country of origin: United States
- Language: English

Creative team
- Created by: Avery Trufelman

Production
- Length: 30–60 minutes

Publication
- No. of seasons: 8
- No. of episodes: 57
- Original release: September 25, 2018
- Provider: Radiotopia

Related
- Website: www.articlesofinterest.co

Articles of Interest is a podcast about the social history of clothing and fashion. Created by producer Avery Trufelman, the show originated in 2018 as a mini-series for 99% Invisible and became an independent member of Radiotopia in 2021.

== History ==
Trufelman told the Daily Front Row her interest in fashion was sparked by childhood visits to San Francisco in which she went thrifting on Haight Street, in addition to learning about Vivienne Westwood at the De Young Museum. She became inspired to report on fashion from a design perspective as a 99% Invisible intern.

The first season of Articles of Interest, reported by Trufelman and edited by Joe Rosenberg, featured six short episodes exploring topics ranging from denim and pockets to punk fashion and the Hawaiian shirt, with commentary on their significance as viewed through the lens of capitalism, identity and aesthetics. The second season, released in 2020, focused on luxury items, including perfume, diamonds, and wedding dresses.

In 2021, 99% Invisible host and creator Roman Mars sold the show to SiriusXM and spun off ownership of Articles of Interest to Trufelman.

Departing from its previous episodic format, the show's third season, released in 2022, was a serialized history of Ivy style and the preppy subculture. Titled "American Ivy", the seven-part season documented the origins of prep at Princeton University, then Japan, as driven by the 1965 book Take Ivy. It returned to the United States to explore the rise of Ralph Lauren, J.Crew, and the publication of The Official Preppy Handbook, tracing the trend to current day.

The show's fourth season returned to an individual-episode format in 2023, with stories on factory labor conditions, ballet shoes, and the Black Fashion Museum.

October 2025 marked the start of "Gear", a serialized investigation into the connection between military dress and gorpcore, a fashion trend which appropriated garments intended for use in outdoor recreation. Gear follows the history of the M43 Field Jacket, the history of American recreation wear companies through early years as military surplus retailers, trends in camouflage, the invention of Gore-Tex, the appropriation of Native American fashion by American frontiersmen, and takes listeners to procurement trade shows and behind the scenes of the production of American-made garments produced for the United States military. Trufelman retold the Field Jacket story with Roman Mars for an episode of the 99% Invisible series A History of the United States in 100 Objects.

== Reception ==
Articles of Interest received critical acclaim beginning with its first season and continuing through its transition to independent production. The original six-part series was named a best podcast of 2018 by The New Yorker, The Globe and Mail, and the BBC. Vulture's Nicholas Quah praised it as a "picture-perfect starting point for those who need an introduction" to the cultural significance of clothing. "American Ivy" was named a best podcast of 2022 by The New York Times and The Atlantic.

== Seasons ==
Season	Episodes	Originally aired		Title
Season	Episodes	First aired	Last aired	Title
1	6	September 25, 2018	October 12, 2018	American Fashion
2	6	May 12, 2020	June 9, 2020	Uniforms
3	7	October 26, 2022	December 7, 2022	American Ivy
4	16	March 29, 2023	November 8, 2023	
5	4	March 20, 2024	May 22, 2024	
6	3	June 18, 2025	August 18, 2025	
7	8	October 15, 2025	December 17, 2025	Gear
8	7	January 16, 2026	April 24, 2026	
