= Jody Avirgan =

American podcast host and producer (born 1980 or 1981)

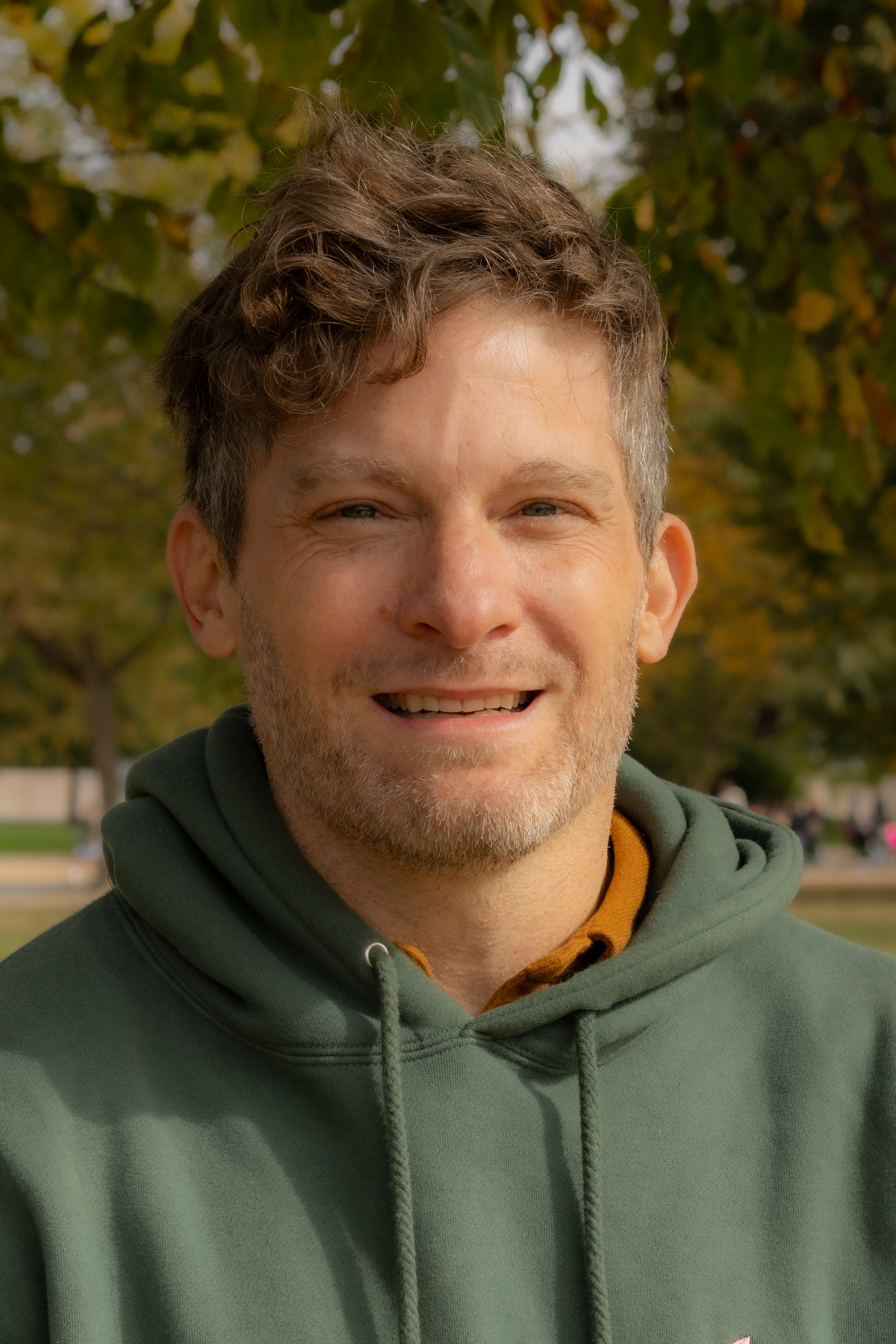
- Avirgan in 2025
- Born: 1980 or 1981 (age 45–46)
- Education: Wesleyan University (BA)
- Occupations: Podcast host and producer
- Years active: 2008 – present
- Notable work: This Day in Esoteric Political History; 30 for 30 Podcasts; FiveThirtyEight Politics Podcast
- Parent: Tony Avirgan and Martha Honey
- Website: jodyavirgan.com

Jody Avirgan (born 1980 or 1981) is an American podcast host and producer known for his work around sports and politics. He currently hosts This Day and previously hosted TED's Good Sport, ESPN's 30 for 30 Podcasts, and the FiveThirtyEight Politics Podcast.

== Early life and education ==
Avirgan grew up in Costa Rica. His parents are the journalists Tony Avirgan and Martha Honey. He attended Sidwell Friends School, where he played soccer, football, and ultimate frisbee. He continued to play ultimate frisbee at the college, club and professional levels, once making a catch that was featured on SportsCenter and later going on to coach youth teams.

Avirgan majored in American studies at Wesleyan University, graduating in 2002. His senior thesis was a film and essay about the life of folk singer and labor activist Joe Hill. After he graduated, he spent a year building houses with Habitat for Humanity before beginning to explore documentary filmmaking and radio.

== Career ==
In 2008, Avirgan became a producer at WNYC, where he worked on shows including Freakonomics Radio and On the Media.

In June 2015, Avirgan joined FiveThirtyEight as host of the podcast What's the Point, about the impacts of data science on daily life. In 2016, he began hosting the site's flagship FiveThirtyEight Politics Podcast. In 2017, Avirgan became senior producer and host of ESPN's 30 for 30 Podcasts, a series of audio documentaries about sports history.

On March 31, 2020, Avirgan began hosting the Radiotopia podcast This Day in Esoteric Political History (later shortened to This Day), which uses events from American political history to explore present-day issues. Avirgan co-hosts with political historians Kellie Carter Jackson and Nicole Hemmer.

In January 2023, TED premiered the podcast Good Sport, hosted by Avirgan and featuring interviews with athletes and other professionals in the sports industry.

Avirgan owns Roulette Productions, a podcast production company whose shows have included Oprahdemics and collaborations with the Audacy studio 2400Sports.

== Personal life ==
Avirgan is married and lives in Brooklyn. He has a daughter.

In 2016, while hiking Mount Roberts in Juneau, Alaska, Avirgan and his wife became stranded on steep terrain after exiting the main trail. The couple was rescued by helicopter.
