= Nate DiMeo =

American screenwriter (born 1974)

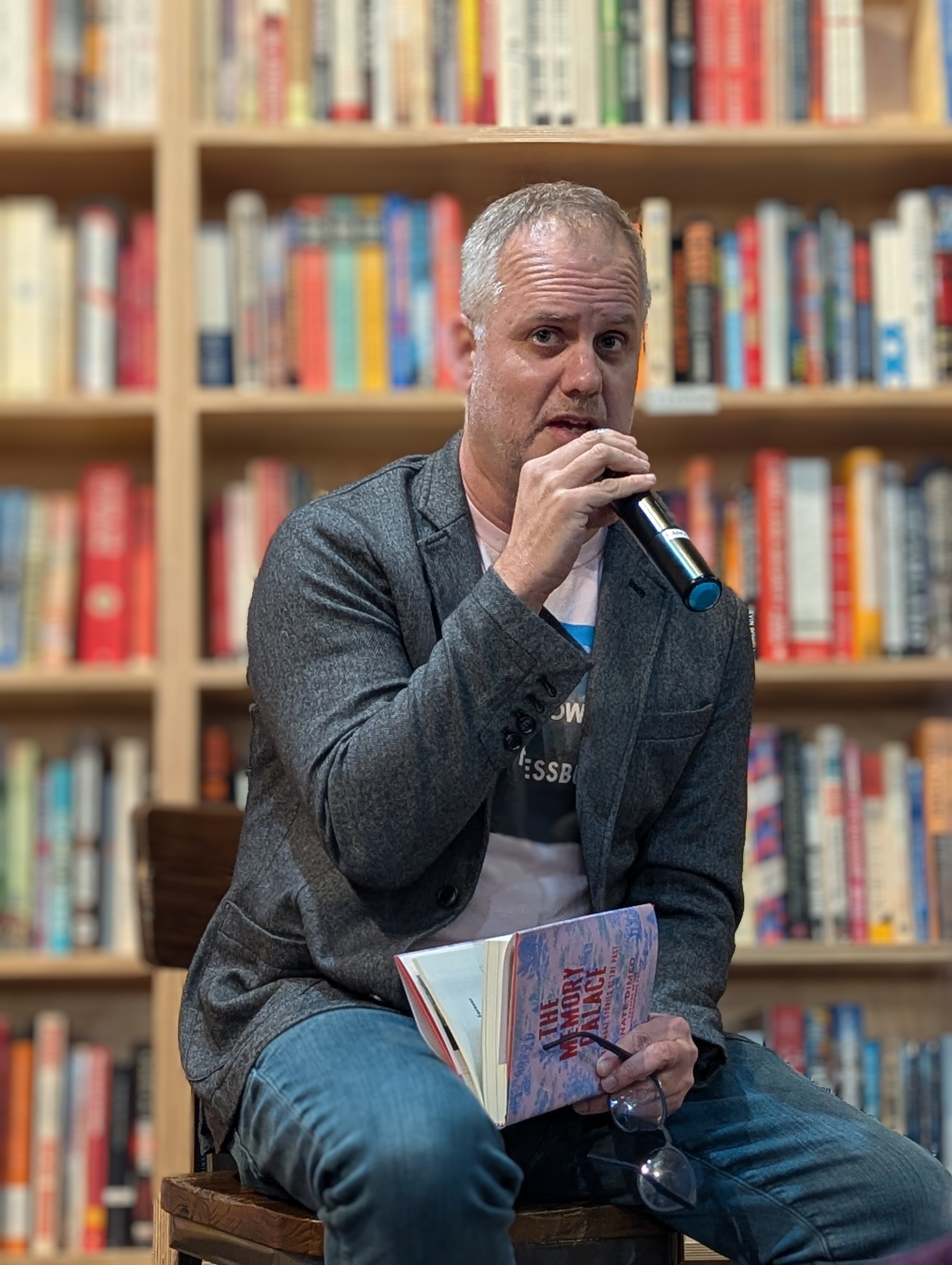
- DiMeo in 2024
- Born: 1974 (age 51–52); Providence, Rhode Island
- Education: Rhode Island College (BA)
- Occupations: Podcaster and author
- Known for: The Memory Palace
- Spouse: Leila Gerstein
- Children: 1

Nate DiMeo (born 1974) is an American podcaster, screenwriter, and author based out of Los Angeles, and the host of the podcast The Memory Palace. He is also the author of Pawnee: the Greatest Town in America (2011) and The Memory Palace: True Short Stories of the Past (2024). He was a finalist for the 2012 Thurber Prize for American Humor.

After a decade in public radio, DiMeo created his podcast on historical narratives. It was nominated for a Peabody Award in 2016.

== Early life and education ==
DiMeo was born in 1974 in Providence, Rhode Island. His parents, John and Judy DiMeo, were special education professors at Rhode Island College.

After his birth, the family moved to Rehoboth, Massachusetts, where he was raised. He suffered from Graves' disease as a teenager. He attended Rhode Island College, graduating in 1997.

== Career ==
After college, DiMeo played guitar for the Providence indie rock band Bermuda. An organizing effort to save the city's Safari Lounge venue led to an interview with WBUR, where DiMeo eventually secured his first job in public radio.

He moved to Los Angeles to become an editor on the public radio show Marketplace. He began reporting on air as well as writing for various television shows, including Parks and Recreation and The Astronaut Wives Club.

He began producing short history-based audio vignettes on the side, mostly at first for his own growth and enjoyment. The first episode of what became The Memory Palace aired in November 2008, and the show became sufficiently popular (and financially viable) that he could work on it full time. The show joined Radiotopia in 2015. From 2016 to 2017, the Metropolitan Museum of Art named him artist-in-residence, and he produced several Memory Palace episodes highlighting aspects and properties of the museum.

In 2024, DiMeo released a book of vignettes adapted from The Memory Palace.

== Personal life ==
DiMeo is married to television writer and producer Leila Gerstein. They live in Los Angeles with their daughter, Quinby.
