= Love and Radio =

Interview podcast

Presentation
- Hosted by: Nick van der Kolk
- Genre: Storytelling, interview
- Language: English
- Updates: Active, bi-weekly
- Length: 45 minutes

Production
- Production: Phil Dmochowski; Steven Jackson
- Audio format: MP3

Publication
- Original release: 2005
- Provider: Luminary Media; Radiotopia

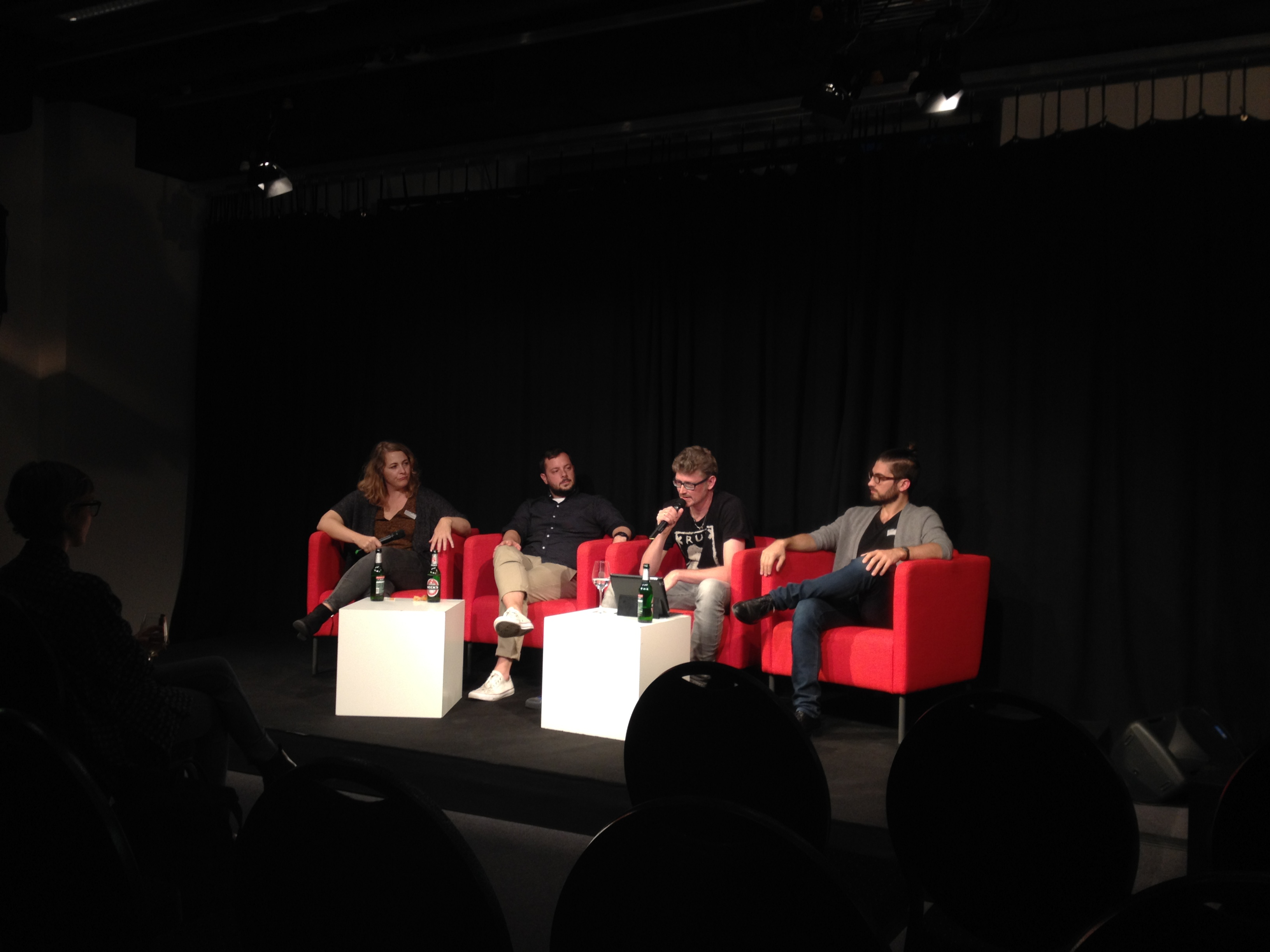
Love + Radio at MIZ Radio Innovation Day 2016 in Potsdam, Germany

Love and Radio (stylized Love + Radio) is an American audio podcast directed by Nick van der Kolk and produced by Phil Dmochowski and Steven Jackson. Love and Radio originally began in 2005 as a series of self-distributed episodes, and the show later received support and distribution from NPR and Chicago Public Media. In 2014 Love and Radio joined the podcast network Radiotopia as one of its seven original shows and began producing episodes on a more regular monthly schedule. In May 2019 Love and Radio left Radiotopia to join the newly launched subscription-supported podcasting service Luminary, starting with their 8th season in May 2019.

Episodes of Love and Radio consist of stories, often presented in personal interviews, either focusing on a single story or sometimes related to a theme. A few segments include fiction, but most are non-fiction. The show's subjects have been described as "people on the cultural edge" and "intriguing characters who aren't quite who you think they are when you first meet them". The show also uses audio production techniques to give the interviews a musical and inventive quality.

In 2011, Love and Radio was awarded the Gold prize for best documentary by the Third Coast International Audio Festival for the episode "The Wisdom of Jay Thunderbolt", which revolves around an interview with a stay-at-home strip club manager. Roman Mars, one of the Third Coast judges, described the piece as "beautifully constructed and composed in ways that are subtle and unique." The show also won Third Coast Awards in 2013 for the episode "Jack and Ellen" and in 2015 for the episode "The Living Room". The Atlantic included the episode "The Living Room" on their list of "The 50 Best Podcast Episodes of 2015".

== Episodes ==
No.	Title	Original release date
1	"With a Bullet"	October 18, 2005
2	"Ghost Stories"	October 30, 2005
3	"Love in Bits"	November 20, 2005
4	"Flip Yr Sh!t"	December 11, 2005
5	"Show Me Yours"	March 2, 2006
6	"Elimination"	April 21, 2006
7	"Secrets"	August 4, 2006
8	"Tell Me the Future"	August 24, 2006
9	"Insane vs. Unsane"	October 30, 2006
10	"In the Company of Men"	January 1, 2007
11	"How I Found Out My Relationship Had No Future, Pt 1"	May 7, 2007
12	"How I Found Out My Relationship Had No Future, Pt 2"	June 21, 2007
13	"Bloody Fingers"	July 12, 2007
14	"Lady Sovereign vs. Jelly Donut"	October 3, 2007
15	"Violent"	November 7, 2007
16	"Strip, Pt 1"	November 15, 2007
17	"Animal Parts"	November 29, 2007
18	"Take It, It’s for You"	February 14, 2008
19	"Aftermath"	March 27, 2008
20	"We’ve Got Your Back, Ashley Dupré"	April 16, 2008
21	"Strip, Pt 2"	June 5, 2008
22	"Split Brain"	October 14, 2008
23	"Dirty Balloons"	November 9, 2010
24	"The List"	December 21, 2010
25	"The Wisdom of Jay Thunderbolt"	April 11, 2011
26	"The Man in the Road"	May 26, 2011
27	"Bedouin Love (Revisited)"	November 4, 2011
28	"Fix"	May 23, 2012
29	"Seventy Weeks"	July 19, 2012
30	"Greenberg’s War"	December 21, 2012
31	"Jack and Ellen"	February 21, 2013
32	"The Pandrogyne"	December 10, 2013
33	"The Superchat"	January 21, 2014
34	"The Silver Dollar"	February 27, 2014
35	"Another Planet"	April 8, 2014
36	"Hostile Planet"	May 13, 2014
37	"I, Sitting Beside Me"	June 12, 2014
38	"Sesquipedalian"	July 29, 2014
39	"Choir Boy"	August 20, 2014
40	"Of Birds and Boundaries"	September 24, 2014
41	"The Magical World of Eva Julia Christiie"	November 24, 2014
42	"An Old Lion, or a Lover’s Lute"	December 19, 2014
43	"The Living Room"	March 6, 2015
44	"Thank You, Princess"	March 27, 2015
45	"Eternity Through Skirts and Waistcoats"	May 12, 2015
46	"Paremoremo"	May 23, 2015
47	"The Adventures of Zoe Nightingale"	June 24, 2015
48	"Greetings from Coney Island"	July 28, 2015
49	"Bride of the Sea"	August 26, 2015
50	"A Red Dot"	September 24, 2015
51	"Discarnate Rebel Angel"	October 22, 2015
52	"Points Unknown"	November 16, 2015
53	"Deep Stealth Mode"	February 25, 2016
54	"The Man In The Road"	April 20, 2016
55	"Another Planet"	May 27, 2016
56	"The Neighborhood"	June 23, 2016
57	"On The Shore Dimly Seen"	July 22, 2016
58	"An Old Lion or a Lover’s Lute, Special Extended Cut"	August 27, 2016
59	"A Girl of Ivory"	September 29, 2016
60	"The Enemy Within"	October 13, 2016
61	"Upper Left"	October 27, 2016
62	"Wood Fighting with Steel"	November 17, 2016
63	"Doing The No No"	December 2, 2016
64	"Blink Once for Yes"	December 26, 2016
65	"No Bad News"	January 13, 2017
66	"The Secrets Hotline"	April 6, 2017
67	"The Pandrogyne"	May 5, 2017
67	"Relevant Questions"	June 16, 2017
68	"The Boys Will Work It Out"	July 6, 2017
69	"Suitcase of Love and Shame"	July 24, 2017
70	"Reunion"	August 24, 2017
71	"For Science!"	September 28, 2017
72	"Photochemical"	October 13, 2017
73	"Murdertown, USA"	October 24, 2017
74	"44 Years"	November 6, 2017
75	"WWCD?"	November 22, 2017
76	"The Machine"	December 11, 2017
