= The Shadows (podcast) =

Romantic comedy audio drama by the CBC

The Shadows is a six episode romantic comedy audio drama podcast created by Kaitlin Prest and produced by the Canadian Broadcasting Corporation. The show debuted on September 25, 2018 and featured performances by Kaitlin Prest and Terry Gross. The show won a New York Festivals Radio Award and a Digital Publishing Award.

== Background ==
The podcast is a six episode romantic comedy audio drama. The show was written and directed by Kaitlin Prest. The show was produced by Kaitlin Prest with help from senior producer Phoebe Wang, Yasmin Mathurin and Sharon Mashihi. It cameos Terry Gross. The show was produced by the Canadian Broadcasting Corporation. After The Heart ended in 2017 Prest began releasing snippets of audio hinting at creating a new show. The podcast debuted the following year on September 25, 2018. The show contains sexually explicit audio.

The show follows a fictional Kaitlin Prest as she explores various futures where she has different relationships. The story is loosely based on Prest's real life and some of the script was taken from her diary. In this fictional universe Prest is a puppeteer in Montreal who meets and develops a relationship with another puppeteer named Charlie. Prest started a company called Mermaid Palace that creates audio fiction.

James Kim wrote in LAist that the show is "beautifully intimate and uses audio as an art form." Rebecca Seidel wrote in LA Review of Books Podcast Review that the show "pushes into new artistic terrain". The show was a Bronze Radio Winner at the New York Festivals Radio Awards. The show won gold in the fiction category at the 2019 Digital Publishing Awards.
