= Generation Y (disambiguation) =

Generation Y is the demographic cohort born between 1981 and 1996, commonly called Millennials.

Generation Y or Generation Why may also refer to:

== Music ==
- "Generation Why" (song), a 2009 song by Kisschasy
- "Why Generation", a song by FIDLAR from the 2015 album Too
- "Generation Why", a song by The Reverend Horton Heat from the 1996 album It's Martini Time
- "Generation Why", a song by singer-songwriter Weyes Blood from the 2016 album Front Row Seat to Earth
- Generationwhy, a 2016 album by Zhu
- "Generation Why", a song by singer-songwriter Conan Gray from the 2018 EP Sunset Season
- "Generation Y", a 2011 album by JPEGMAFIA (as Devon Hendryx)

== Other uses ==
- Generation Why (podcast), a true crime podcast
- "Generation Why" (Ms. Marvel), the first episode of the 2022 American TV series Ms. Marvel
- Generation Y or Generación Y, a blog by Yoani Sánchez

== See also ==
- Generation Yes (disambiguation)
- Millennials (disambiguation)
