= Jessica Caloza =

American politician

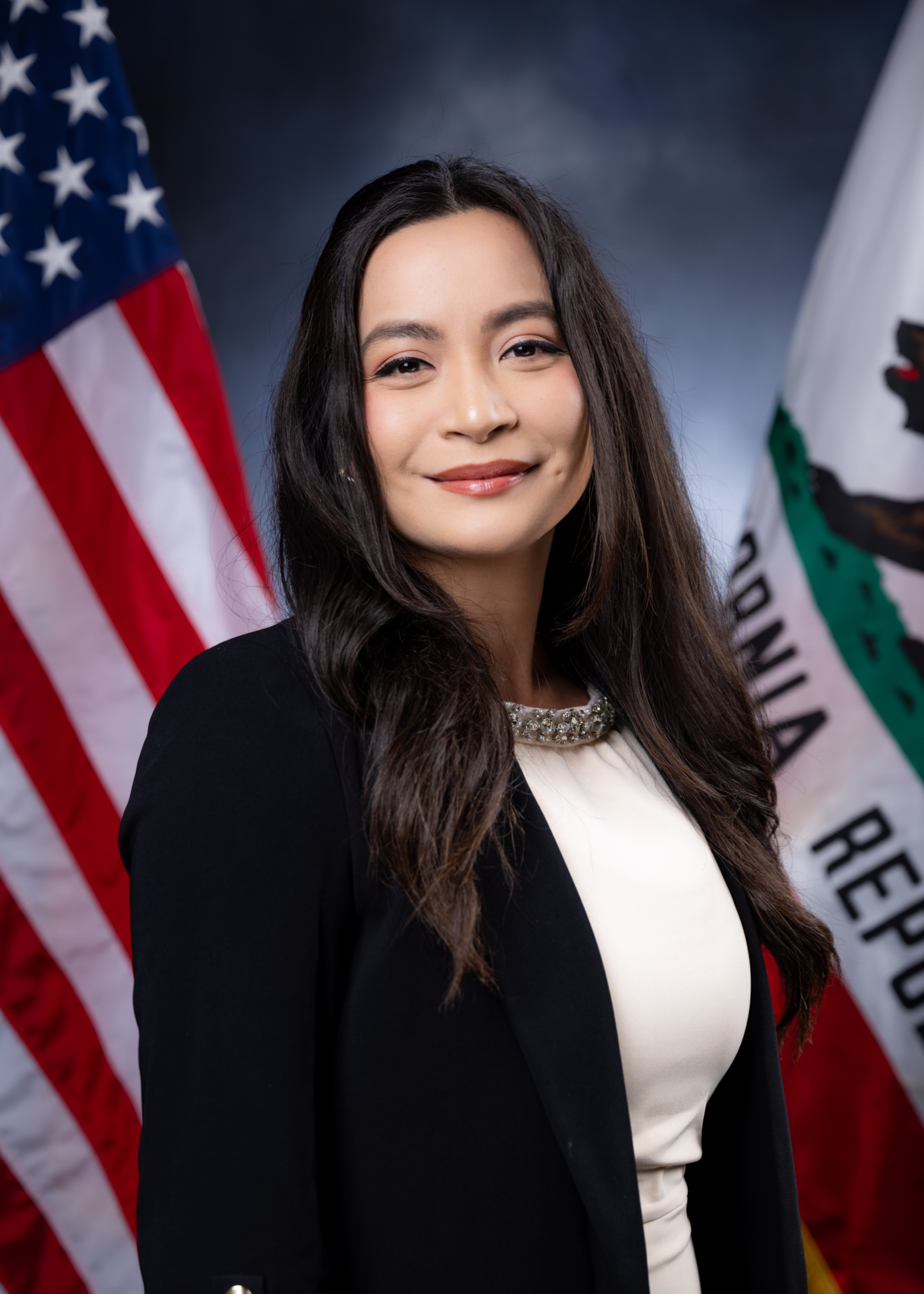
- Official portrait, 2024

Member of the California State Assembly from the 52nd district
- Incumbent
- Assumed office December 2, 2024
- Preceded by: Wendy Carrillo

Personal details
- Born: Quezon City, Philippines
- Education: University of California, San Diego (BA)

Jessica Caloza is an American politician, serving as a member of the California State Assembly for the 52nd District since 2024. A member of the Democratic Party, she is the first Filipina elected to the California State Legislature. She also serves as the Assistant Majority Whip.

== Early life and education ==
Caloza was born in Quezon City, Philippines, and immigrated to the United States as a child. She comes from a working-class background and graduated from the University of California, San Diego with a bachelor's degree in international relations and ethnic studies. Caloza is the first person in her family to graduate from college in the United States.

== Career ==
Caloza is a longtime public servant and started her career working as a community organizer for President Barack Obama's campaign in Virginia. She went on to work as a policy advisor in the Obama Administration at the U.S. Department of Education in Washington, D.C. After serving at the federal level, Caloza worked for Los Angeles Mayor Eric Garcetti in the Office of Immigrant Affairs. In 2019, she was appointed by Mayor Garcetti to serve as a Commissioner on the Board of Public Works, which is the only full-time commission in the City of Los Angeles. She oversaw the Bureau of Engineering and the Bureau of Contract Administration and led critical infrastructure projects and neighborhood beautification initiatives like the Sixth Street Bridge and Historic Filipinotown Eastern Gateway. She also led initiatives to support small businesses and critical policies that expanded language access to make city services more accessible. After working at the local level, Caloza joined the California Department of Justice and served as the deputy chief of staff to California Attorney General Rob Bonta.

== California State Assembly ==
In July 2023, Caloza announced her campaign for the California State Assembly in the 52nd District to replace incumbent Wendy Carrillo, who ran for the Los Angeles City Council. In the March 2024 primary, Caloza and Franky Carrillo advanced to the general election from a crowded field of ten candidates. In November 2024, Caloza handily won the general election, beating Carrillo—108,882 votes (66.92%) to her opponent's 53,820 (33.08%).

== Electoral history ==
2024 California State Assembly 52nd district election
Primary election
Party	Candidate	Votes	%
Democratic	Jessica Caloza	23,391	29.8
Democratic	Franky Carrillo	20,569	26.2
Republican	Stephen Sills	10,082	12.8
Democratic	David Girón	9,184	11.7
Democratic	Ari Ruiz	5,832	7.4
Democratic	Carlos J. León	2,628	3.3
Democratic	Genesis Coronado	2,583	3.3
Democratic	Sofia Quinones	2,080	2.6
Green	Shannel Pittman	1,160	1.5
Democratic	Anthony Libertino Fanara	992	1.3
Total votes		78,501	100.0
General election
Democratic	Jessica Caloza	108,882	66.9
Democratic	Franky Carrillo	53,820	33.1
Total votes		162,702	100.0
Democratic hold			
