= Nicole Hemmer =

American historian

- Hemmer in 2023
- Education: Marian University (BA); Columbia University (MA, MPhil, PhD)
- Scientific career
- Fields: History; Political science
- Workplaces: Manchester University; University of Sydney; University of Miami; Miller Center of Public Affairs; Columbia University; Vanderbilt University
- Doctoral advisor: Alan Brinkley; Michael C. Janeway; Ira Katznelson; Casey Blake; Sarah Phillips

Nicole Hemmer is an American historian. She is an associate professor of history and director of the Carolyn T. and Robert M. Rogers Center for the American Presidency at Vanderbilt University. She specializes in the history of conservative media in the United States from the 1940s to the present, and the role of right-wing media in American electoral politics. She is particularly involved in public communication that aims to provide historical context for contemporary events in American politics. Hemmer has been a regular columnist or an editor of historical series at print media outlets like The Washington Post, U.S. News & World Report, CNN and The Age, and she hosts the American history podcasts Past Present and This Day in Esoteric Political History.

== Education and academic positions ==
Hemmer is from Indiana. She attended Marian University in Indianapolis, graduating with a B.A. in 2001 with a major in psychology and a minor in political science. She then earned an M.A. in 2005, an M.Phil. in 2006, and a Ph.D. in 2010, all in U.S. history at Columbia University. Her dissertation was entitled Messengers of the Right: Media and the Modern Conservative Movement, and was supervised by Alan Brinkley.

From 2009 to 2011, Hemmer was an adjunct lecturer at Manchester University in Indiana, and in 2011 she became a postdoctoral researcher at the United States Studies Centre at the University of Sydney.

In 2012, she joined the faculty at the University of Miami, and in 2015 joined The Miller Center of Public Affairs at the University of Virginia. She subsequently moved to the Interdisciplinary Center for Innovative Theory and Empirics at Columbia University becoming a scholar with the Obama Presidency Oral History Project there.

== Research ==
In 2016, Hemmer published the book Messengers of the Right: Conservative media and the transformation of American politics, which arose from her PhD dissertation. The book traces the development of right-wing media in the United States from its origins in 1940s and 1950s periodicals like Human Events and National Review and radio programs like Clarence Manion's Forum of Opinion, through to contemporary conservative media like The Rush Limbaugh Show and Fox News.

Messengers of the Right is primarily structured around three figures: the mid-century right wing media broadcaster Clarence Manion, the publisher Henry Regnery, and the columnist William A. Rusher; Hemmer was credited with writing the first detailed treatment of Manion, and one of the first on Regnery. The development of this media landscape is situated in the context of conflicts within the Republican Party. In particular, conservative media and conservative politicians did not always have a close relationship in America, and Messengers of the right is concerned with the development of that relationship to the point that media figures like Rush Limbaugh, Bill O'Reilly, and Sean Hannity can often be understood as acting collaboratively with politicians like Ronald Reagan, Newt Gingrich, and Donald Trump.

By studying the development of right-wing media from the promoters of the original America First movement and the supporters of Barry Goldwater through to conventional right-wing media outlets in contemporary America, Hemmer's work contextualized the ascent of far-right nationalist media figures like Steve Bannon and the outlet Breitbart News around the time of the 2016 United States presidential election. Hemmer also studies the relationship of these media outlets to the truth, demonstrating that some early right-wing outlets were openly motivated by a belief that objectivity is not possible in political news media, and that therefore ideologically driven media is justified in explicitly pursuing partisan electoral goals.

Hemmer's research on conservative media and its role in electoral politics has been reviewed or cited in news outlets like NPR, Vox, Politico, and The Washington Times.

== Public communication ==
Hemmer has been a regular host of several podcast series. Since 2015, Hemmer has hosted the weekly podcast Past Present with the historians Natalia Mehlman Petrzela and Neil J. Young, which discusses recent American political events in the context of American political history. In 2020, she launched the Radiotopia podcast This Day in Esoteric Political History with Jody Avirgan, the former host of the FiveThirtyEight elections podcast, and Kellie Carter Jackson. Each episode of This Day in Esoteric Political History describes an event that happened on the same day of the year as that episode, focusing on events that might inform the current moment. Hemmer also created a 6-part podcast called A12, which focused on the Unite the Right rally and its historical context.

Hemmer has also been a regular history contributor to print media outlets. She co-founded the "Made By History" series at The Washington Post, and served as one of two editors-in-chief of the series. From 2013 to 2018, she wrote a weekly column for the U.S. News & World Report. Since 2014, she has been a syndicated columnist at The Age.

== Published works ==
- Messengers of the Right: Conservative Media and the Transformation of American Politics (2016). ISBN 9780812293074
- Partisans: The Conservative Revolutionaries Who Remade American Politics in the 1990s (2022). ISBN 9781541646889
