= Kellie Carter Jackson =

American historian

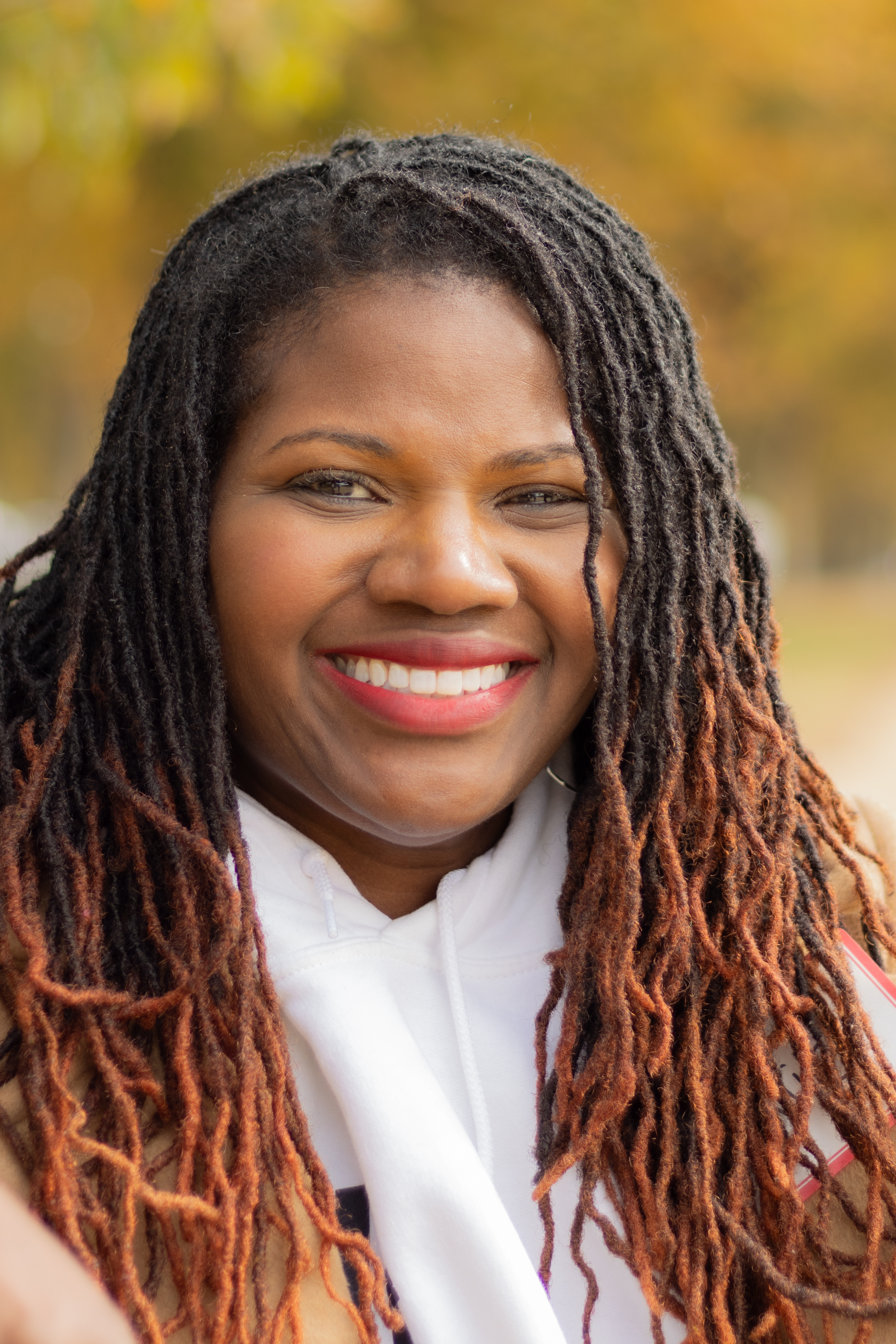
- Education: Howard University, Columbia University
- Occupations: Historian, scholar and broadcaster

Kellie Carter Jackson is an American academic scholar, author and broadcaster researching history of slavery, abolitionists, violence and black women’s history.

== Career ==
Jackson is Historian-in-Residence for the Museum of African American History in Boston and co-host on the Radiotopia podcast, “This Day in Political Esoteric History” with Jody Avirgan and Nicole Hemmer and creator of “Oprahdemics: The Study of the Queen of Talk” with Leah Wright Rigueur. In 2022 Oprahdemics changed its name to "You get a podcast" after Oprah Winfrey's company sued to prevent confusion over her support for the show.

Jackson holds a B.A. from Howard University, a Ph.D. from Columbia University. She was a Fellow in the Department of African & African American Studies at Harvard University and is the Michael and Denise ‘68 Associate Professor of Africana Studies at Wellesley College.

== Research ==
Jackson's book Force & Freedom: Black Abolitionists and the Politics of Violence (University of Pennsylvania Press) was a finalist for the Frederick Douglass Book Prize, and winner of the James H. Broussard Best First Book Prize given by SHEAR (Society for Historians of the Early American Republic)

Reconsidering Roots is a collection of articles reconsidering the politics, scope and impact of Alex Haley's Roots in the 1970s.

== Works ==
- Ball, Erica; Jackson, Kellie Carter (2017). Reconsidering Roots: Race, Politics, and Memory. Athens: University of Georgia Press. ISBN 978-0-8203-5083-7.
- Jackson, Kellie Carter (2019). Force and Freedom: Black Abolitionists and the Politics of Violence. Philadelphia: America in the Nineteenth Cent. ISBN 978-0-8122-5115-9.
- Jackson, Kellie Carter (2024-06-04). We Refuse: A Forceful History of Black Resistance. Seal Press (CA). ISBN 978-1-5416-0290-8.
