= Avery Trufelman =

American podcaster and radio producer

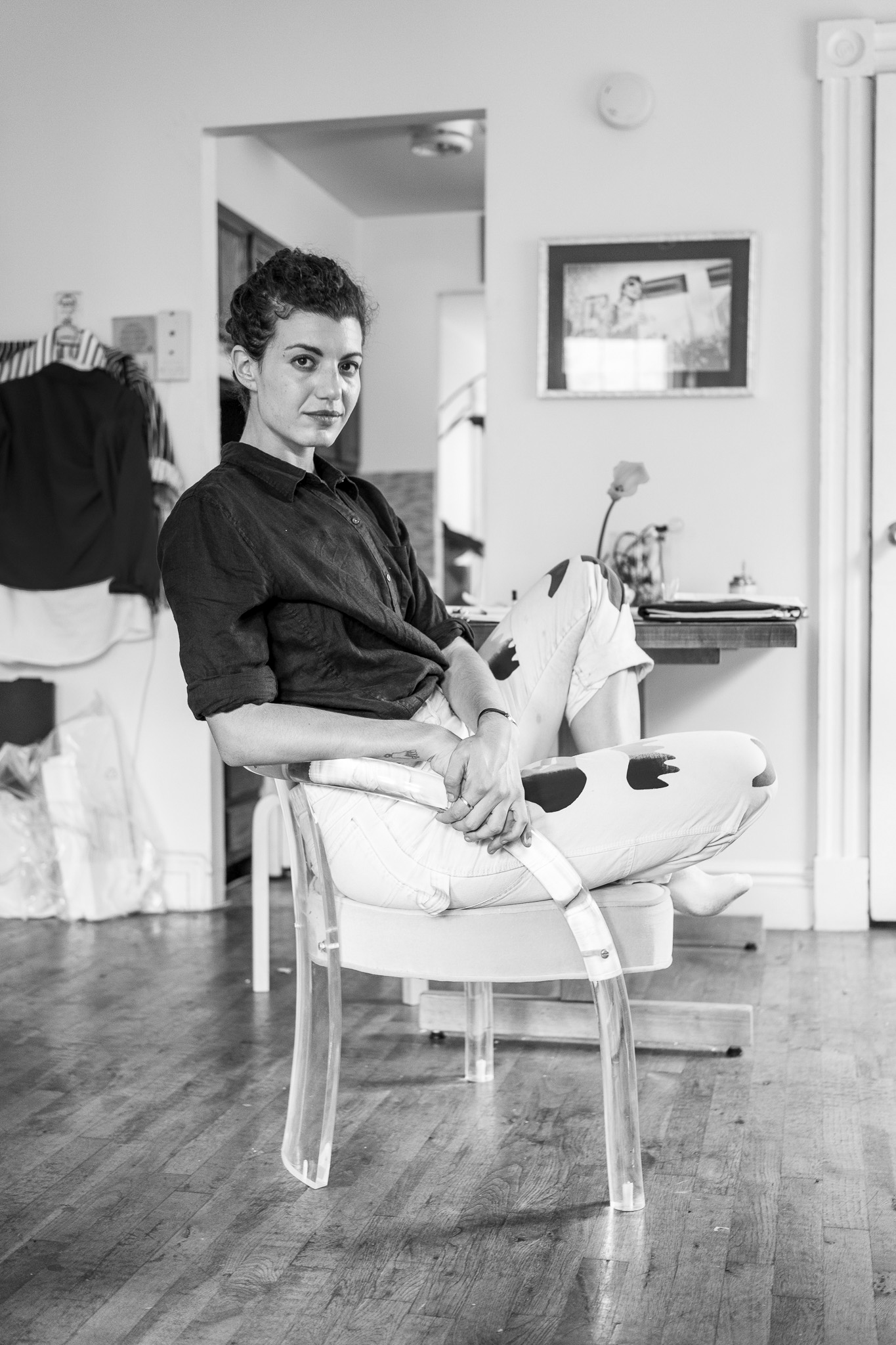
- Trufelman at her home in 2022
- Born: 7 March 1991 (age 35)
- Citizenship: American
- Education: Wesleyan University (BA)
- Occupation: Radio producer
- Known for: 99% Invisible; Articles of Interest; Nice Try!
- Website: averytrufelman.com

Avery Trufelman is a podcaster and radio producer. She is best known for her work on 99% Invisible (2013–2020) and its spin-off, Articles of Interest (2018–present).

== Background ==
Avery was born into a "radio family" of two WNYC producers and was raised in Westchester County, New York. She attended Wesleyan University, graduating in 2013 with degrees in German and Letters. While at Wesleyan, she worked at the campus radio station WESU. After graduating, she interned for the now-defunct NPR Berlin in Germany.

== Career ==
Following her stint with NPR, Trufelman interned at 99% Invisible and eventually became the show's third full-time producer following Sam Greenspan and creator Roman Mars. She would hold this position until her departure in 2020, although she returned for a single episode in 2022, credited as "producer emeritus".

=== Articles of Interest ===
In 2018, Trufelman spearheaded 99% Invisible's first spinoff series, Articles of Interest, which explores the origins of clothing pieces and fashion subcultures. The New Yorker named the first season the fourth best podcast of 2018 and the second season the sixth best podcast of 2020. Vulture named the season one finale, "Punk", the best podcast episode of 2018. At the conclusion of the second season, she announced her departure from 99% Invisible.

In 2021, upon selling 99% Invisible to SiriusXM, Mars transferred ownership of Articles of Interest to Trufelman. In 2022, she independently produced a third season, American Ivy, a serialized history of preppy fashion. The New Yorker named it the sixth best podcast of 2022 while industry creatives surveyed in Vulture named it the third best. In 2023, she returned to an episodic format.

=== Other ventures ===
In 2019, Trufelman was recruited to host Nice Try! for Vox Media's Curbed. The first season, Utopian, profiles various failed utopian experiments throughout history, including Jamestown, Virginia and Biosphere 2. In 2021, she hosted a second season, Interior, which traces the history of various homemaking tools, including the vacuum cleaner and the crock-pot.

In 2020, following her departure from 99% Invisible, Trufelman began hosting the relaunch of New York's The Cut podcast, moving from Oakland to Brooklyn in the process. Her guests included cartoonist Alison Bechdel, screenwriters Josh Goldsmith and Cathy Yuspa, and author Michelle Zauner. Trufelman left The Cut in 2021 to resume work on Nice Try! and Articles of Interest. She has also appeared as a guest on several other podcasts including The Business of Fashion Podcast, You're Wrong About, High Brow, and Nymphet Alumni.

== Projects ==
Year	Title	Role	Provider	Notes
2013–2020; 2022	99% Invisible	Producer	PRX; Radiotopia	39 episodes
2018–present	Articles of Interest	Writer, Performer	PRX; Radiotopia	19 episodes
2019–present	Nice Try!	Writer, Performer	Curbed	15 episodes
2020–2021	The Cut	Host	New York	25 episodes
2020	Switched On Pop	Guest	Vulture	Episode: "Baz Luhrmann's 'Sunscreen Song' –– The '90s' Most Unlikely Hit"
