= Lea Thau =

Radio personality and podcaster

- Born: 1971 (age 54–55); Denmark
- Citizenship: American
- Occupations: Radio and podcast producer
- Known for: The Moth, Strangers
- Website: StoryCentral.org

Lea Thau (born 1971) is an American radio producer and director. She is the host and producer of the podcast Strangers and the former executive and creative director of The Moth.

== Biography ==
Originally from Aarhus, Denmark, Thau moved to Paris at the age of 18, and then to New York at the age of 23 as a visiting scholar in Comparative Literature at Columbia University.

While living in New York as a graduate student, Thau discovered the then-fledgling live storytelling show The Moth. She began working for the organization in 2000 as a part-time employee, starting the organization's Community Outreach Program. In December 2001, she became the Executive and Creative Director, a position she held for a decade before departing in April, 2010. While in that position, she created the short-form Moth Podcast in 2008 and The Moth Radio Hour in 2009 with a broadcast launch to more than 70 public radio stations. The show won a Peabody Award in 2010.

In 2011, Thau created the podcast Strangers, which she describes as "stories about people we meet, the connections we make, the heartbreaks we suffer, the kindness we encounter, and the frightful moments when we discover we aren't even who we thought we were". Strangers was started with the support of KCRW's Independent Producer Project in 2012, and it joined the Radiotopia podcast network in 2014. Strangers left Radiotopia in December, 2017, to go independent.

== Personal life ==
Thau lives and works in Los Angeles, California.

== Awards and honors ==
- In 2014, Slate included Strangers on its "25 Best Podcast Episodes Ever" list.
- In 2014, Los Angeles named Strangers one of its "15 Podcasts to Add to Your Permanent Playlist"
- In 2015, Strangers won the Public Radio March Madness Bracket Contest, beating out shows such as This American Life and Radiolab.
