= Generation Yes (Scotland) =

Generation Yes was a political organisation established to campaign for a yes vote amongst young voters in the referendum on Scottish Independence. It was established in January 2014 with an official launch two months later.

== History ==
Generation Yes was founded by Rhiannon Spear and Kirsten Thornton in January 2014. Its main mission was to ensure that the arguments for voting yes in the referendum on Scottish Independence reach young voters, especially newly enfranchised 16- and 17-year-olds.

A launch event was held in Glasgow on 29 March 2014. The organisation registered with the Electoral Commission on 8 May 2014.

== Following the referendum ==
A poll taken after the 2014 referendum showed 71% of teenagers had voted yes. Despite defeat, activists stated that they were proud of the campaign they had led and announced that they intended to continue as a group aiming to engage with and educate young people in politics.
