= Millennial (blog) =

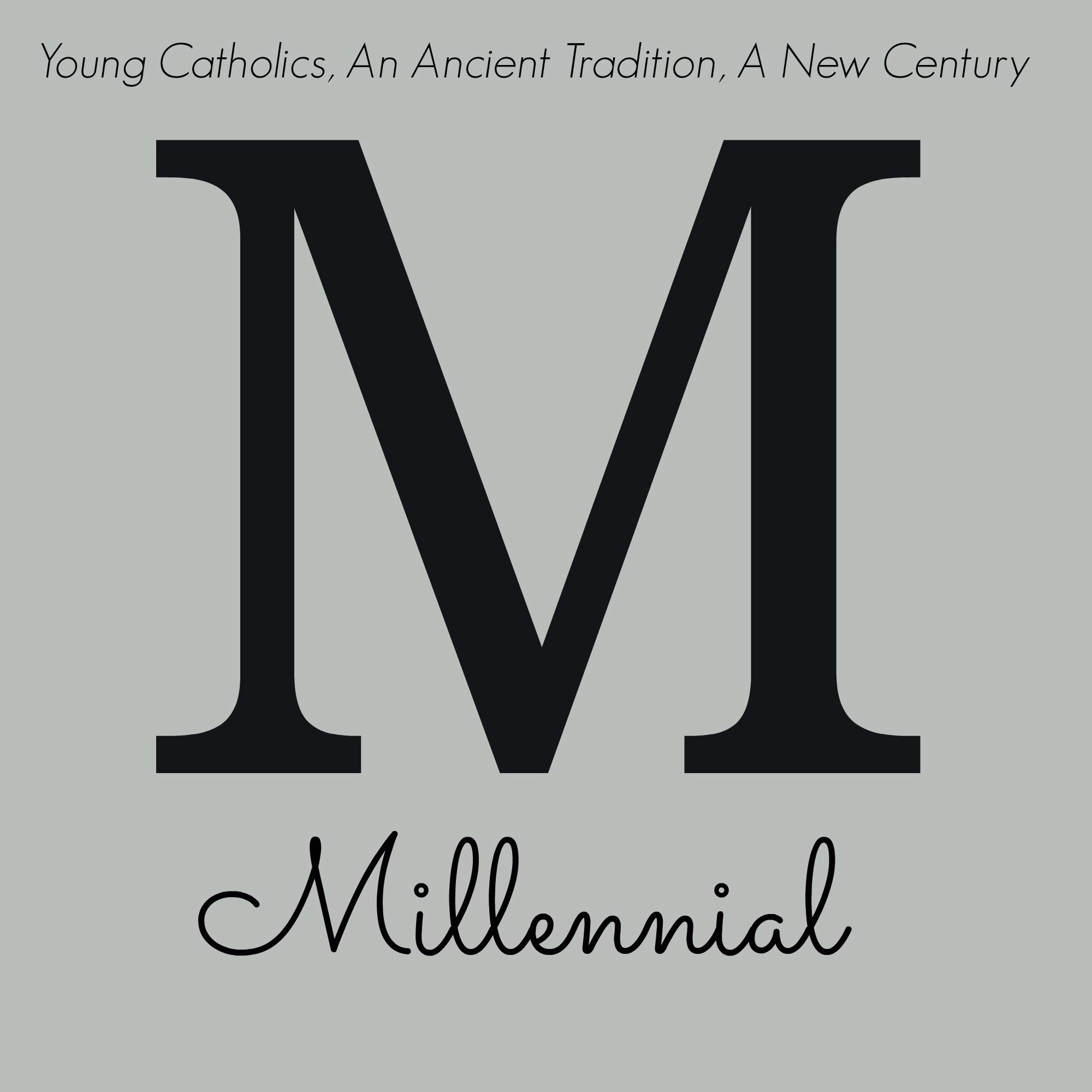
- Website type: Religious journal and blog
- Available in: English
- Editors: Robert G. Christian, III
- Website: MillennialJournal.com
- Commercial: No
- Launched: September 4, 2012
- Current status: Active

Millennial is an online journal and blog written by millennial Catholics offering "world-class Catholic opinion and analysis on the most pressing issues of our times in politics, religion, and culture." The authors, described as "quite an impressive group of commentators," are said to "perfectly weave together current events and the Catholic intellectual tradition" and are adept at "finding real-world practicality to Catholic theology."

Called "an online home to Catholic writers in their 20s and 30s," the site seeks to "amplify the voices of a younger generation and provide insight and analysis on the issues that matter to this generation." There is no precise definition of when the millennial generation began, but all millennial writers were born during the pontificate of John Paul II.

The blog "eschews a Catholicism forced to fit neatly into left- or right-leaning ideological camps." The writers, according to the editor, are "the most talented people who are orthodox and committed to church teaching on the sanctity of human life and social justice.”

It has been said that Millennial "perfectly represents the future of young intellectuals in the church" and Michael Sean Winters of the National Catholic Reporter has encouraged his readers to "regularly consult the writings of these fine young Catholic thinkers." Articles and posts mix "intellectual rigor with crisp writing and nuanced reflection." Journal articles and blog entries from Millennial have been cited in places such as Commonweal, Religion News Service, U.S. Catholic, and elsewhere.

It was founded in 2013 by Robert Christian and Christopher Hale, two millennial Catholics who met at Holy Trinity Church in Washington, DC. It is funded by Catholics in Alliance for the Common Good.
