= The Heart (podcast) =

Podcast hosted by Kaitlin Prest

- Genre: Storytelling, documentary
- Hosted by: Kaitlin Prest
- Original release: 2014
- Website: https://www.theheartradio.org/

The Heart is a podcast created by Kaitlin Prest in 2014.

== Background ==
The show started out in 2008 as a college radio show on CKUT-FM. Before the show was picked up by Radiotopia, it was called Audio Smut and focused on sex from a female perspective. Seasons are composed of 4 to 15 episodes. The show had more than seven million listens between 2014 and 2017.

Prest has stated that the show is partly a "feminist urge to document the private sphere, the realm of emotion, what sex actually is, what love actually is". The show had a miniseries called Pansy, which focused on femininity in men. In an episode titled Meat, a man named Jonathan Zenti discusses how society mistreats him as a fat person, but Zenti loves himself and his body anyway.

In 2023, Prest did two miniseries called Sisters and Dad each of which focused on her relationship with her family. Sisters was co-created by Prest's younger sister Natalie. Fiona Sturges wrote in the Financial Times, that the miniseries is some of Prest's best work.

The show took a two-year break and returned in 2020 with new hosts Nicole Kelly and Phoebe Unter.

== Reception ==
=== Awards ===
Award	Date	Category	Result	Ref.
Peabody Awards	2017	Radio/Podcast	Finalist	
Third Coast Festival Awards	2016	Best Documentary	gold	
Prix Italia	2015	New Radio Formats	gold	
