= Millennial (podcast) =

Autobiographical podcast by Megan Tan

Presentation
- Hosted by: Megan Tan
- Language: English
- Updates: Ended

Production
- No. of seasons: 3
- No. of episodes: 49

Publication
- Original release: January 16, 2015 – August 16, 2017

Related
- Website: www.millennialpodcast.org

Millennial is an independently produced podcast created by Megan Tan that focuses on the transition between university and work, "how to maneuver your twenties". It explores the subject of finding meaningful and fulfilling work with the pressures of money, status, and self-worth. The podcast is autobiographical and includes interviews with people in Tan's life including family members, coworkers, and friends. The series began in 2015 when Tan left college and was unemployed living in her childhood home.

In 2016, Millennial joined Radiotopia, becoming the 14th show in the network. In August 2017, the show aired its final episode. Tan explained her decision to end the podcast, saying it was turning into something different from what she envisioned at the start.

== Reception ==
The podcast has received positive reviews in several media outlets such as The Atlantic, BuzzFeed, The Guardian and The Huffington Post. In May 2015, Priya Elan wrote in The Guardian, "Millennial is a consistently engaging podcast. Tan's audio autobiography feels like an authentic study of the twenty-something condition in 2015; caught between an economic landslide and an uncemented sense of self".

== See also ==
- Millennials
