= Kathy Tu =

American podcaster and producer

Kathy Tu is an Asian-American podcaster and current head of production at Wondery. Tu previously co-hosted Nancy (WNYC/New York Public Radio) until 2020 and worked for New York Times Opinion podcasts.

Tu was listed on Fast Company's "Queer 50" list in 2022.
