= The Kitchen Sisters =

US National Public Radio radio producers

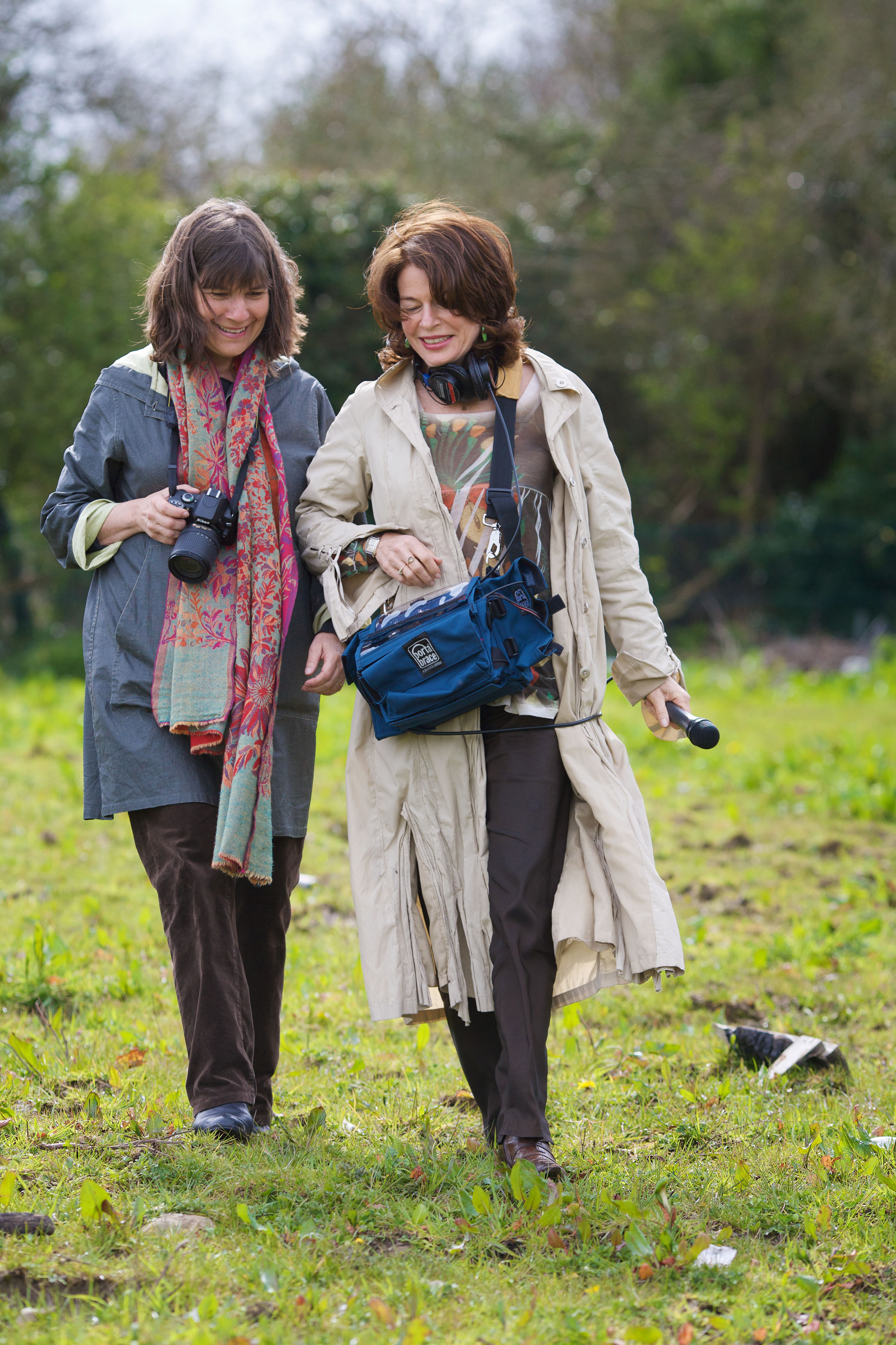
Nikki Silva and Davia Nelson

The Kitchen Sisters are Davia Nelson and Nikki Silva, who are National Public Radio radio producers in the United States.

== Career ==
Nelson and Silva met in 1979, in Santa Cruz, California. Silva was curating museum exhibits about local history, and Nelson was recording oral histories for KUSP. They began doing a weekly radio show together about California regional culture. While Silva also works as a museum curator, and Nelson as a casting director, they have collaborated as radio producers ever since meeting. Their name comes from two eccentric brothers, Kenneth and Raymond Kitchen, who were stonemasons in Santa Cruz in the 1940s. The Kitchen Brothers were the subjects of one of Nelson and Silva's first radio pieces.

The Kitchen Sisters have produced over 200 stories for public broadcast. They chronicle hidden bits of history and subjects who have shaped the diverse cultural landscape. Their work includes Lost & Found Sound, narrated by Francis Ford Coppola, the Sonic Memorial Project, narrated by Paul Auster, Waiting for Joe DiMaggio, WHER: The First All-Girl Radio Station in the Nation, the Hidden Kitchens series, Hidden Kitchens Texas, an hour long nationwide broadcast special narrated by Willie Nelson and Robin Wright, and The Hidden World of Girls series. They currently produce the podcast The Kitchen Sisters Present for Radiotopia.

The Kitchen Sisters are recipients of awards that include the duPont-Columbia Award, two Peabody Awards and three Audie Awards.

=== Writing ===
Their book, Hidden Kitchens: Stories, Recipes and More from NPR's The Kitchen Sisters was published in 2005 by Rodale Books. The book was a tie-in to the NPR series Hidden Kitchens. It explores street corner cooking, kitchen rituals and visionaries, legendary meals and eating traditions. The audio book is narrated by actress Frances McDormand.

The Kitchen Sisters contributed an essay to John Biewen's book, Reality Radio along with Jay Allison, Ira Glass, Jad Abumrad and other radio producers.

== Nikki Silva ==
Nikki Silva is a radio producer, and museum curator from Santa Cruz, California. Over the past twenty years, Silva has worked as history curator at the Santa Cruz Museum of Art and History, and as a freelance curator and exhibit consultant specializing in regional history. She and her husband, designer and artist Charles Prentiss, have produced dozens of exhibitions for museums throughout California including long-term exhibits chronicling the histories of Santa Cruz County, California, San Jose, California, Campbell and San Leandro. Some of the special exhibits Silva produced include: "California Indian Basketweavers": a look at historic and contemporary Native American weavers and their work; "The World Famous Tree Circus": the saga of a California roadside attraction; the history of the Chinese in the Monterey Bay Region; "Never a Dull Moment": the story of the Santa Cruz Beach Boardwalk, the last of California's early 20th century coastal amusement parks, and many more.

== Works ==
- Hidden Kitchens: Stories, Recipes, and More from NPR's The Kitchen Sisters. Rodale Press. 2005. ISBN 9781594863134.
