= Everything Is Alive (podcast) =

Podcast by Radiotopia

Everything Is Alive is a podcast produced by Radiotopia and hosted by Ian Chillag. The show consists of bi-weekly fictional unscripted interviews with inanimate objects.

== Background ==
The show is an unscripted fictional interview podcast that is based in a real world setting. The podcast is a form of improv comedy. The podcast is hosted by Ian Chillag and features a new guest each episode. Chillag has worked as a producer on Wait Wait... Don't Tell Me! and Fresh Air with Terry Gross. The podcast released episodes bi-weekly on Tuesdays and each season contained 10 episodes each. The podcast debuted in 2018 and each episode is about 20 minutes in length. The podcast is produced by Radiotopia and follows the network's trend of focusing on non-human subjects in their shows. In each episode of the podcast Chillag interviews an inanimate object played by the show's guest. The first episode features an interview with Louis Kornfeld as a can of soda. There are not environmental sounds in the interviews. The show contains bizarre facts that are true such as a tangent in the episode featuring a can of soda about radioactive soda called Radithor.

== Reception ==
The A.V. Club included the podcast on their list of the podcasts that defined the 2010s and noted that the show helped introduce audiences to fiction podcasts while also pushing the boundaries of podcasting in general. Harsh Pareek wrote in Firstpost that the podcast is "hilarious, heartfelt and often weird". Nicholas Quah called the show a "unique, quirky, and smart little package with a unexpectedly moving edge." Sarah Larson compared the show to Dr. Katz, Professional Therapist while Harriet Fitch Little compared the show to The Young Ones and Modern Toss.

=== Awards ===
Award	Date	Category	Result	Ref.
Webby Awards	2019	Best interview or talk show podcast	Won	
Webby Awards	2019	People's Voice Winner	Won	
DiscoverPods Awards	2018	Best new podcast	Finalist	
