= Strangers (podcast) =

Storytelling podcast

Presentation
- Hosted by: Lea Thau
- Genre: Storytelling
- Language: English
- Updates: Current
- Length: 30-60 minutes

Production
- Production: Lea Thau, Paul Dreux Smith

Publication
- Original release: January 12, 2012
- Provider: KCRW, Radiotopia

Strangers is a podcast hosted by Danish-born producer Lea Thau. Initially part of KCRW's Independent Producer project, Strangers became a founding member of PRX's Radiotopia podcasting collective in 2014. Thau announced in November 2017 that Strangers would be leaving the Radiotopia collective.

== History ==
After a decade as executive and creative director for the storytelling organization The Moth and having created both its short-form podcast and The Moth Radio Hour, Thau was awarded a 2010 Peabody Award and radio station KCRW offered that she produce her own show. Lea's concept for Strangers was to bring strangers together to share stories. Thau kept creative control and only used KCRW to mix the final product. By 2017, the show had 500,000 monthly downloads, and two full-time employees besides Thau. Slate highlighted the show's 2014 arc on Thau's "life-altering heartbreak" as among the best in podcasting. Los Angeles magazine recommended the podcast in 2014, and Southern California KPCC listeners rated it their favorite podcast in 2015.

== Episodes ==
In 2014 Thau created the miniseries "Love Hurts" about dating after being dumped by her fiancé while she was pregnant with their child. Slate ranked one installment of the series among "the 25 best podcast episodes ever." In April 2017 Thau released another miniseries called "Lea in Trumpland" as an exposé on Donald Trump-supporters around the U.S. The series was a departure from the show's usual showcase of "extraordinary stories of humanity." In another episode, "Debbie's Story," Thau interviews a young Iranian Jewish immigrant to the U.S about femininity, religion, and her family's harrowing experience in crossing borders.

== Awards ==
In 2015 Strangers won KPCC's Public Radio Bracket Madness, beating stalwarts Radiolab, This American Life and Invisibilia for best podcast of the year.
