= 99% Invisible =

American radio program and podcast on design

- Genre: Arts; design; architecture
- Language: English

Cast and voices
- Hosted by: Roman Mars

Production
- Production: Roman Mars (2010–present); Sam Greenspan (2010–17)
- Length: < 10 minutes (early seasons) < 60 minutes (later seasons)

Technical specifications
- Audio format: MP3

Publication
- No. of episodes: 625 (as of April 2025)
- Original release: September 3, 2010
- Provider: PRX (radio); Radiotopia (podcast)
- Updates: Active, weekly

Reception
- Ratings: All audiences

Related
- Website: 99percentinvisible.org

99% Invisible is a radio show and podcast produced and created by Roman Mars that focuses on design. It began as a collaborative project between San Francisco public radio station KALW and the American Institute of Architects in San Francisco. PRX has distributed the show for broadcasting on a number of radio stations and as a podcast on the Radiotopia network. On April 28, 2021, Roman Mars announced in an introduction of a re-released episode that 99% Invisible had been purchased by SiriusXM and marketed as part of its Stitcher Radio brand.

== History ==
The name of the show was derived from a quote by Buckminster Fuller that, "Ninety-nine percent of who you are is invisible and untouchable."

In 2014, 99% Invisible began its fourth season, the first in which it had a weekly release schedule.

As of 2024, show staff includes Executive Producer Kathy Tu; Design Director Kurt Kohlstedt; Senior Editor Delaney Hall; Director of Sound Swan Real; Senior Audio Engineer Martín Gonzalez; Supervising Producers Christopher Johnson and Vivan Le; as well as Producers Chris Berube, Emmett FitzGerald, Joe Rosenberg, and Lasha Madan as well associate producer Jeyca Medina Maldonado. Former staff include Sam Greenspan, Katie Mingle, Sharif Yousseff and Avery Trufelman. Trufelman left to host "Articles of Interest," "Nice Try!" and "The Cut" podcasts.

In April 2021, the company that produces the show (99% Invisible Inc.) was acquired by SiriusXM.

== Reception ==
Critical reception has generally been very positive, with the show garnering acclaim from many notable radio producers and media outlets. Ira Glass of This American Life described the show as "completely wonderful and entertaining and beautifully produced," and Jad Abumrad has said the show "has a kind of rhythm and musicality that you don’t normally find in radio or podcast storytelling." In 2013, Yahoo! News included 99% Invisible on its list of "best podcasts you aren't listening to but should be," and Miranda Sawyer of The Observer highlighted the show, saying "it's just great."

The creator and host of 99% Invisible, Roman Mars, was included in Fast Company's Most Creative People list of 2013 for his work on 99% Invisible, and included on the Most Creative People in Business 1000 in 2014. He is known for his casual way of talking, often laughing during discussions.

As of January 2014, the show was listed in the top fifty podcasts of the iTunes Top Podcasts chart. In 2014, the show had greater than 4,000 listener ratings on iTunes and upwards of 97% gave the show five stars. The show's 2014 episode Structural Integrity was one of nine award winners at the 2015 Third Coast International Audio Festival.

In 2017, 99% Invisible was named as one of the "50 best podcasts" by Time magazine.

=== Awards ===
| Award | Date | Category | Result | Ref. |
|---|---|---|---|---|
| duPont-Columbia Journalism Award | 2022 | Podcast Series | Won | |
| Discover Pods Awards | 2019 | Best Overall Podcast | Won | |
| Discover Pods Awards | 2021 | Society & Culture Podcast | Won | |
| Webby Awards | 2016 | Best Podcast | Won | |
| Webby Awards | 2017 | People's Voice Winner for Best Podcast Host | Won | |
| Webby Awards | 2020 | Arts & Culture Podcasts | Nominated | |
| Third Coast International Audio Festival | 2015 | Best Documentary | bronze | |
| Academy of Podcasters Awards | 2015 | Society & Culture | Won | |
| Academy of Podcasters Awards | 2015 | People's Choice Award | Won | |
| Academy of Podcasters Awards | 2016 | Arts | Won | |
| Academy of Podcasters Awards | 2017 | Arts | Finalist | |

== Guest hosts and collaborations ==
99% Invisible has produced a variety of episodes in collaboration with other producers and radio shows. "The Political Stage", episode 63, was a collaboration with Andrea Seabrook and DecodeDC that focused on the production of campaign trail events. Episode 84B, called "Trading Places with Planet Money," was made with NPR's Planet Money podcast and discusses commodity trading in the context of the 1983 film Trading Places.

== Series ==
=== Articles of Interest ===
In September 2018, producer Avery Trufelman released a six-episode series within the 99% Invisible feed focused on the design of clothes. Articles of Interest was initially published as part of the show before later being spun off under the ownership of its producer. Another six episodes were released in June 2020.

=== According to Need ===
In December 2020, the show released a six-episode series According to Need about homelessness and solutions produced by Katie Mingle. 99% Invisible received the duPont-Columbia Journalism Award for the series.

=== Judas and the Black Messiah Podcast ===
In 2021, 99% Invisible produced a five-episode series titled Judas and the Black Messiah Podcast. The podcast delved into both the making of the film and the history of the Black Panther Party that the film was about.

=== Not Built for This ===
In August 2024, the show debuted a six-episode series titled Not Built for This, produced by Emmett FitzGerald and discussing how the dynamics of climate change are playing out around the United States, using specific real-world examples to highlight present and ongoing impacts.

=== Adapt or Design ===
Starting in March 2025, 99% Invisible released a multimodal series dubbed Adapt or Design, produced by Kurt Kohlstedt, covering assistive designs and adaptive technologies for functionally one-handed persons. The project started with 12 articles (split across three mini-series) and culminated in a keystone audio episode.

=== Hidden Levels ===
In October 2025, 99% Invisible and WBUR's "Endless Thread" produced Hidden Levels, a six-part series about how video games left the arcade and started reshaping the real world. Roman Mars and Ben Brock Johnson host it.

=== A History of the United States in 100 Objects ===
In May 2026, as a means of celebrating the United States Semiquincentennial, 99% Invisible began a series called A History of the United States in 100 Objects, which Mars and the 99% Invisible staff co-produced with BBC Studios. The inspiration for this series traces back to A History of the World in 100 Objects, itself a collaborative podcast produced by the BBC and the British Museum, and this series aims to act as a quasi-sequel focused on artifacts that tell the story of the history of the United States specifically.

== Book ==
In October 2020, Houghton Mifflin Harcourt published The 99% Invisible City: A Field Guide to the Hidden World of Everyday Design by Roman Mars and Kurt Kohlstedt with detailed line drawings by Patrick Vale. The book looks back at 10 years of uncovering good examples of design on the podcast and consists of short stories on the history behind everyday urban features and architecture. It became a New York Times and National Best Seller and was translated into several languages, including Spanish, Czech, Chinese, Korean, and Japanese. Mars and Kohlstedt were unable to travel for a physical book tour due to COVID 19, but were interviewed remotely by Hank Green, Seth Godin, Alexis Madrigal, and Kristen Meinzer as part of an alternative virtual book tour. Mars also recorded the audiobook version.
