= Roman Mars =

American radio producer

- Education: Bard College at Simon's Rock; Oberlin College; University of Georgia
- Occupation: Radio producer
- Known for: 99% Invisible
- Website: romanmars.com

Roman Mars is an American radio producer. He is the host and producer of 99% Invisible, a KALW radio show and podcast, and a founder of the podcast collective Radiotopia, which he describes as efforts "to broaden the radio landscape [and] make shows that aren't bound by conventions" of public radio in the United States. In 2020, he co-authored the New York Times best seller The 99% Invisible City with Kurt Kohlstedt.

He has also contributed to radio programs Radiolab and Planet Money. Fast Company identified him as one of the hundred most creative people of 2013. Mars, with Elizabeth Joh, also hosts the podcast What Roman Mars Can Learn About Con Law.

== Early life ==
Mars left a PhD program in genetics to undertake an unpaid internship at public radio station KALW in San Francisco.

In 2004, he produced a program called Invisible Ink on KALW.

== 99% Invisible ==
Mars and his radio show, 99% Invisible, have been credited in the mainstream press as an innovative form of radio production, defining a new movement of independent radio and podcast creators. In 2016, Mars and Justin McElroy used asynchronous podcasting, a method where each person recorded their portions separately and later combined them to create a podcast episode. This new technique was used to create the first episode of Smart Stuff, which started with My Brother, My Brother and Me episode 316 and was completed in 99% Invisible episode 225.

99% Invisible Inc., the company that produces 99% Invisible, was sold to SiriusXM's Stitcher Radio in April 2021. Mars donated $1 million from the sale to Radiotopia.

== Books ==
In October 2020, Mars and 99pi digital director Kurt Kohlstedt released The 99% Invisible City, a non-fiction book that functions as a field guide to the built environment. Mars noted that the book allowed the team to explore visual stories that were difficult to convey in a purely audio format. The book debuted on the New York Times Best Seller list for hardcover non-fiction.

== Radiotopia ==
In partnership with the Knight Foundation and the Public Radio Exchange (PRX), Mars also created the podcast collective Radiotopia. The Public Radio Exchange has hired Mars to curate a radio program called Remix, which is syndicated by at least 14 public radio stations across the US. In June 2017, Roman Mars began cohosting the constitutional law podcast What Trump Can Teach Us About Con Law with Elizabeth Joh, a professor of the subject at University of California, Davis, School of Law.

== Use of crowdfunding ==
Mars notably used the Kickstarter crowdfunding platform to support 99% Invisible, raising over $170,000, making it the highest-funded journalism project ever, and the second highest-funded project across the platform's entire publishing category. In November 2013, 99% Invisible's season four Kickstarter campaign received 11,693 backers raising over $375,000. The original goal of $150,000 was raised in 92 hours. Following this success, Mars introduced another campaign to build season two of Radiotopia, a collection of seven storytelling podcasts: 99% Invisible, Fugitive Waves, Love and Radio, Radio Diaries, Strangers, Theory of Everything, and The Truth. Its original goal of $250,000 was funded within six days. By the time the campaign closed on November 15, 2014, it had more than doubled its original target, achieving $620,412 from 21,808 backers, making it the most-funded Kickstarter project in the publishing and radio and podcast categories. Meeting its 'stretch goals' allowed Radiotopia to add three podcasts hosted by women (Criminal, The Heart, and The Allusionist), host a series of events, provide more content, wage increases and paid internships, and create a pilot development fund to find new, talented producers and hosts not covered by traditional radio. Ultimately, the fundraising allowed for a fourth podcast, Mortified, to be added to the collective.

== Publications ==
- Mars, Roman; Kohlstedt, Kurt (2020). The 99% Invisible City: A Field Guide to the Hidden World of Everyday Design. Houghton Mifflin Harcourt. ISBN 978-0-358-12660-7.
