= 2018 Webby Awards =

US internet awards ceremony

The 23rd annual Webby Awards were held at Cipriani Wall Street in New York City on May 14, 2018, which was hosted by comedian and writer Amber Ruffin. The Webby Awards have been dubbed the "internet's highest honor" and, in 2018, received over 13,000 entries from 70 countries, with 10% receiving nominations.

== Winners ==
(from http://webbyawards.com/winners/2018/)

Category	Sub-Category	Webby Award Winner	People's Voice Winner
Webby	Agency of the Year	BBDO NY	
Webby	Athlete of the Year	Chris Long	
Webby	Best Actor	David Harbour	
Webby	Best Actress	Laura Linney	
Webby	Film & Video Person of the Year	Steven Soderbergh	
Webby	Lifetime Achievement	Mitchell Baker	
Webby	Media Company of the Year	National Geographic	
Webby	Person of the Year	Susan Fowler	
Webby	Special Achievement	David Chang	
Webby	Special Achievement	Adam Sandler	
Webby	Special Achievement	FKA Twigs	
Webby	Special Achievement	Jesse Williams	
Webby	Special Moment	March for Our Lives	
Web	Activism	Refugees Welcome	Change.org
Web	Cultural Blog/Website	The History of the Mausoleum of Augustus by Havas Milan	
Web	Real Estate	Nooklyn	Zillow
Web	Corporate Communications in Websites	Walgreens - Let's Grow Old Together	Spotify.me by GLOW Digital and Social Agency
Sports		Arsenal.com by Inviqa	
Online Film & Video	Viral Video (unbranded)	Used Car Commercial // 1996 Honda Accord by Max Lanman	
Online Film & Video	Music Video	Kolshik	OK GO – Obsession
Online Film & Video	Variety	Vogue.com Meryl Streep cover interview with Anna Wintour	The Tonight Show Starring Jimmy Fallon Music
Best Writing	Better Call Saul Los Pollos Hermanos Training Videos - Ariel Levine	Deadpool Musical -Zamurai Productions, Paul Bianchi	
Mobile Sites & Apps	Best Streaming Video	PBS Kids video app	YouTube TV
Mobile Sites & Apps	Best Streaming Audio	Pandora Music	
Podcasts	Arts & Culture	A Piece of Work	Masterpiece Studio
Podcasts	Best Branded Podcast or Segment	IRL Podcast	
Podcasts	Best Host	RuPaul: What's the Tee? with Michelle Visage	Criminal Podcast
Podcasts	Best Individual Episode	Conversations with People Who Hate Me	
Podcasts	Best Series	S-Town	
Podcasts	Best Sound Design/ Original Music Score	Invisible City Podcast	Radiolab Presents: More Perfect
Podcasts	Best Writing	S-Town	Myths and Legends
Podcasts	Business	"The sentence that helped set off the opioid crisis" episode of The Uncertain Hour	Masters of Scale
Podcasts	Comedy	Heavyweight: A Sketch Comedy Show	2 Dope Queens
Podcasts	Documentary	Ear Hustle	The FRONTLINE Dispatch
Podcasts	Family & Kids	The Longest Shortest Time	Brains On!
Podcasts	Interview/Talk Show	Death, Sex & Money	Here's the Thing
Podcasts	Lifestyle	The Fridge Light	Terrible, Thanks for Asking
Podcasts	News & Information	Pod Save the People	
Podcasts	Science & Education	TED Radio Hour: Manipulation	
Podcasts	Sports	The Bill Simmons Podcast	
Podcasts	Technology	The Privacy Paradox from Note to Self	
Games	Best Art Direction	Cuphead	
Games	Best Multiplayer/Competitive Game	Overwatch by Blizzard Entertainment	Fortnite by Epic Games
Games	Best Game Design	Overwatch	
Games	Best Visual Design	Inside	Cuphead
Games	Puzzle	Monument Valley 2	Two Dots
This table is incomplete, please help to complete it from material on this page.
