= Abumrad =

Abumrad is a surname. Notable people with the surname include:

- Jad Abumrad (born 1973), American radio host
- Nada Abumrad, Lebanese-American obesity researcher
- Naji Abumrad (born 1944), Lebanese-American surgeon
