= The Stakes =

Political podcast

- Genre: Political podcast; History; Economics; Culture
- Language: American English

Cast and voices
- Hosted by: Kai Wright

Production
- Length: 25-30 Minutes

Publication
- Original release: April 3, 2019
- Provider: WNYC Studios
- Updates: Bi-weekly

Related
- Related shows: More Perfect; There Goes the Neighborhood
- Website: www.wnycstudios.org/podcasts/the-stakes

The Stakes is a podcast hosted by Kai Wright and produced by WNYC Studios.

== Background ==
The podcast focuses on a wide range of topics including public health, hip-hop, civil rights, and police violence. The podcast released an episode called "The Abortion Clinic That Won’t Go Quietly", which addressed the problem of having a single abortion provider in Alabama.

== Reception ==
The podcast was included on The Atlantic's list of "The 50 Best Podcasts of 2019".
