= The United States of Anxiety =

Political podcast

- Genre: Political podcast; History podcast
- Language: American English

Cast and voices
- Hosted by: Kai Wright

Production
- Length: 30–60 Minutes

Publication
- No. of seasons: 1
- No. of episodes: 100
- Original release: September 18, 2018
- Provider: WNYC Studios; The Nation
- Updates: Weekly

Related
- Related shows: Unfinished: Deep South; Yo, Is This Racist?; Code Switch; Pod Save the People; Still Processing
- Website: www.wnycstudios.org/podcasts/anxiety/

Notes from America with Kai Wright, formerly known as The United States of Anxiety is a nationally-syndicated, live call-in show that situates current events within political and historical contexts. The show is produced by WNYC Studios.

== Background ==
The podcast, which first launched under the name The United States of Anxiety, began as a reaction to the political polarization of the 2016 American election. The podcast focuses on the history of racism in America. The podcast discusses school segregation and its continuing effects in American education. In 2020, the podcast received a permanent spot on WNYC's radio schedule. On 25 September, 2022, WNYC Studios began syndicating the show nationally to public radio stations. It now airs on over 100 stations.

== Reception ==
The Atlantic included the show on their list of "The 50 Best Podcasts" in 2016, 2017, and 2018. The podcast received the 2017 New York Press Club Award for its coverage of the presidential race. The show also won the 2018 NYSAPA award.
