= Everson (name) =

Everson is a given name and a surname, an English patronymic from the personal name Evert. Notable people with the name include:

== Given name ==
- Everson Arantes de Oliveira, Brazilian footballer (born 1982), known monomynously as Alemão
- Everson Bilau (born 1990), Brazilian footballer
- Everson (footballer, born 1975), Brazilian footballer (Everson Pereira da Silva)
- Everson (footballer, born 1990), Brazilian footballer (Everson Felipe Marques Pires)
- Everson (footballer, born 1997), Brazilian footballer (Everson Bispo Pereira)
- Everson Griffen (born 1987), American football player
- Everson Junior (born 2001), French footballer
- Éverson Alan da Lima, Brazilian footballer (born 1986), known monomynously as Lima
- Everson Maciel (born 1978), Brazilian footballer and manager
- Everson Pereira (born 2001), Venezuelan baseball player
- Everson Rodrígues, Brazilian footballer (born 1971), known monomynously as Ratinho
- Éverson Teixeira (born 1974), Brazilian sprinter
- Everson Walls (born 1959), American football player
- Everson Xolo (1946–2012), South African politician and traditional leader

== Surname ==
- Adelbert Everson (1841–1913), American Civil War soldier
- Amy Everson, American artist, actor, and screenwriter
- Andy Everson (born 1972), First Nations artist from British Columbia
- Ben Everson (born 1987), English footballer
- Bill Everson (1906–1966), Welsh international rugby union footballer
- Carrie Everson (1842-1914), American metallurgist and inventor
- Corinna Everson (born 1958), American bodybuilder
- Cromwell Everson (1925–1991), South African composer
- E. W. Everson (1857–1931), American politician
- Edward William Everson (1883–1950), Shanghai Police constable
- Harland E. Everson (1917–1992), American politician
- Joel Everson (born 1990), New Zealand rugby union footballer
- John Everson (born 1966), American novelist
- Kevin Jerome Everson (born 1965), American artist and filmmaker
- Landis Everson (1926–2007), American poet
- Margaret Everson, Acting director of the United States National Park Service
- Mark Everson (born 1954), American politician
- Melvin Everson (born 1957), American minister and politician
- Michael Everson (born 1963), American-Irish type designer
- Olaf Everson (1912–1995), New Zealand cricketer
- Peter Everson (born 1957), British Army general
- R.G. Everson (1903–1992), Canadian poet
- Ronald Everson (1930–2024), American politician
- Wendy Everson (born 1965), English track racing cyclist
- William Everson (poet) (1912–1994), American poet
- William Everson (Wisconsin politician) (1841–1928), American politician
- William G. Everson (1879–1954), United States Army general
- William K. Everson (1929–1996), American historian
- Zach Everson, American journalist

== See also ==
- Everson (disambiguation)
- Emerson (surname)
