= Jia Jiang =

American author

- Born: Beijing, China
- Education: Brigham Young University; Duke University
- Occupations: Entrepreneur, author, speaker
- Known for: Creator of 100 Days of Rejection Therapy series of video blogs; Author of the book Rejection Proof; CEO and owner of Rejection Therapy
- Website: www.jiajiang.com

Jia Jiang is a Chinese born American author, businessperson, and speaker, who is known primarily for his work related to overcoming rejection.

== Early life ==
Jiang was born in Beijing, China, and came to the United States aspiring to become an entrepreneur. He obtained a Bachelor of Computer Science from Brigham Young University and a Master of Business Administration from Duke University in 2009.

== Career ==
Jiang began his career as a marketing manager for Dell in Austin, Texas. He then developed a social media to-do list app called Hooplus, but one of the major investors dropped out four months into the venture.

In 2012, after discovering Jason Comely's Rejection Therapy website, Jiang created a blog and video series titled 100 Days of Rejection Therapy, which went viral on social media. Jiang ultimately acquired the Rejection Therapy website. He also became the CEO of Wuju Learning, a company that is engaged in "rejection training".

In 2013 Jiang gave his first TEDx talk, Surprising Lessons From 100 Days of Rejection, at TEDxAustin. In May 2015, he gave another TEDx talk, What I Learned From 100 Days of Rejection, to a local audience at TEDxMtHood, which was later featured on TED.com and TED Radio Hour.

=== Books ===
In 2015 his first book–a self-help, motivational autobiography titled Rejection Proof: How I Beat Fear and Became Invincible Through 100 Days of Rejection–was published by Penguin Random House. In 2023, Audible included the book in its list of "top 100 well-being books of all time."

In 2024 Jiang signed a deal with Simon & Schuster for his second book, The Art of Achieving Ambitious Things, scheduled for publication in 2026. The book is intended as a guide for accomplishing personal, professional, or organizational goal.

== Recognition ==
Jiang was the recipient of the Golden Gavel Award by Toastmasters International in 2019.
