= Talkhouse =

US digital media outlet and online magazine

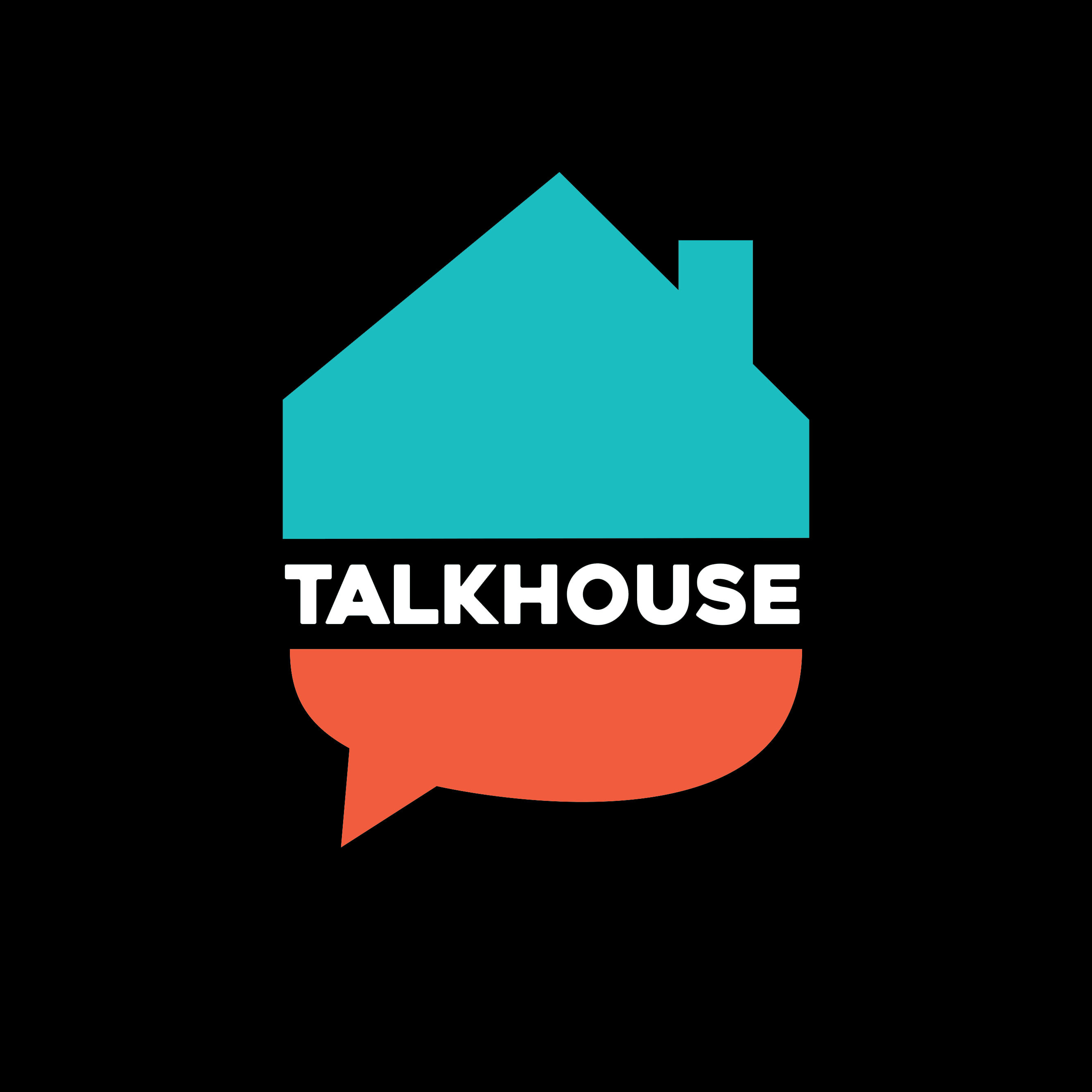
- Website type: Online magazine
- Available in: English
- Founded: 2013
- Headquarters: Brooklyn, New York
- Founders: Ian Wheeler; Tim Putnam
- Website: talkhouse.com

Talkhouse is a digital media outlet, online magazine, podcast network and production company created in 2013 by Ian Wheeler and Tim Putnam. On the website, musicians, actors, and filmmakers share their experiences in their respective fields in personal essays, discuss their peers' work in editorials and reviews, and converse with one another via the Talkhouse Podcast. In the early 2020s, Talkhouse began expanding into podcast production beyond the original Talkhouse podcast and becoming a podcast network. In 2025, Talkhouse began film production activities by executive producing Björk's Apple Music Live film Cornucopia which premiered on Apple TV+ before being released in theaters worldwide.

== Podcasts ==
Talkhouse distributes podcasts through the Talkhouse Podcast Network in addition to producing podcasts in-house.

=== Talkhouse Podcast Network ===
Podcasts distributed through Talkhouse Podcast Network include the original Talkhouse Podcast itself, launched in 2014. It pairs artists, musicians, filmmakers, comedians, and actors in conversations about their work, often but not always focused on music or film. Episodes are unmoderated artist-on-artist conversations that typically run from 30 minutes to an hour. Guests have included Questlove, Abbi Jacobson, Fred Armisen, Alia Shawkat, David Cross, Chelsea Manning, Ian Brennan, A$AP Ferg, Lauren Mayberry, Martin Rev, Lena Dunham, Kamasi Washington, Tim Heidecker, Aidy Bryant, Seth Meyers, RZA, Talib Kweli, Haim, Mac Demarco, Michael Stipe, Japanese Breakfast, Joe Pera, Ben Gibbard, Jeff Tweedy, Matt Berninger, and Jemaine Clement. Episodes are generally released every Thursday on iTunes, Stitcher, and SoundCloud.

Some artists after appearing as guests on the Talkhouse Podcast have gone on to collaborate with one another. For example, Courtney Barnett was featured on The Breeders' record All Nerve, and Kim Deal of The Breeders was featured on Barnett's Tell Me How You Really Feel. For another example, Merrill Garbus of Tune-Yards and Laurie Anderson worked together on Anderson's art installation "Habeas Corpus" at The Park Avenue Armory in 2018.

Josh Modell is the host and producer of the podcast, which also features frequent appearances by Talkhouse Film editor-in-chief Nick Dawson. The podcast was previously hosted by Ella Einhorn and by former Talkhouse Music editor-in-chief Michael Azerrad.

Notable episodes include: Kid Cudi with Paul Reubens, for which the Talkhouse Podcast was honored by the Webby Awards in the category of "Best Individual Episode," Matt Berninger with Conor Oberst, Carrie Brownstein with Questlove, and Lauren Mayberry with Haim.

Another notable Talkhouse Network podcast is Sing for Science, created and hosted by musician Matt Whyte, which features musicians talking about their music and then transitions into conversations related to a guest scientist's field of study.

Other podcasts distributed through the Talkhouse Podcast Network include:

- Blank Check with Griffin & David
- Can't Knock the Shuffle
- Creativity in Captivity
- Dad Bod Rap Pod
- Emil Amos’ Drifter's Sympathy
- Father Hoods
- How Long Gone
- Jokermen
- Life of the Record
- Music Person
- Noble Champions (by Santigold)
- Raw Report with Dice Raw
- Revelations with Jack Dunphy
- Secret Skin
- SHEROES
- Solicited Advice with Alison Roman
- States of Independence
- SubwayTakes with Kareem Rahma
- Summer Album/Winter Album
- Super Duty Tough Work
- That's How I Remember It with Craig Finn
- The Almanac of Rap
- The Questions Hip Hop Trivia
- The Screenwriting Life
- This is TASTE
- Transmissions (by Aquarium Drunkard)
- What Had Happened Was (by Open Mike Eagle)

=== Talkhouse Originals ===
Talkhouse also produces original podcasts, which are distributed on the Talkhouse Podcast Network or via other distributors. These include:

- 365 days with mxmtoon
- Björk: Sonic Symbolism (distributed by Mailchimp)
- Fela Kuti: Fear No Man (co-produced with Western Sound, distributed by Higher Ground Productions and Audible)
- Feist's Pleasure Studies
- Holiday Survival Guide with Jen Kirkman
- Listening (distributed by Mailchimp)
- McIntosh For The Love of Music...
- ODB: A Son Unique" (distributed by USG Audio)
- Playing With Fire
- Sound Influence: The Art and Soul of Puerto Rico
- The Road To Joni
- The Save Space
- The True Story of the Fake Zombies (distributed by iHeart Media)

== Website ==
Talkhouse's website publishes personal essays, op-eds, and criticism written by artists, for artists. The editorial direction of Talkhouse includes reviews, personal essays, video essays, and playlists. Josh Modell is the Executive Editor, Nick Dawson is the editor-in-chief of Talkhouse Film, and Annie Fell is the editor-in-chief of Talkhouse Music.

Notable pieces from the website include: Lou Reed reviewing Kanye West's Yeezus, Ezra Koenig (Vampire Weekend) reviewing Drake's Nothing Was the Same, Rose McGowan's "Open Letter to Scott Baio and Those Like Him," and "Buzz Osborne (The Melvins) Talks the HBO Documentary Kurt Cobain: Montage of Heck."

== Awards and Recognitions ==
=== Awards ===
Year	Production	Episode/Item	Award	Category	Recognition
2017	Talkhouse Podcast	Kid Cudi and Paul Reubens	Webby	Podcasts & Digital Audio, Best Individual Episode	Honoree
2018	Talkhouse Podcast	Rose McGowan Talks with Meredith Graves	Webby	Podcasts & Digital Audio	Honoree
2020	FORM x Talkhouse	Fred Armisen and Mary Lynn Rajskub Talk with Lindsey Jordan (Snail Mail) for the Talkhouse Podcast	Webby	Podcasts, Live Podcast Recording	Nominee
2021	Talkhouse Podcast	Black Thought (The Roots) with Wyatt Cenac live from On Air Fest	Webby	Best Live Podcast Recording	Winner
2023	Mailchimp & Talkhouse	Björk: Sonic Symbolism	Webby	Podcasts, Best Partnership or Collaboration	Nominee
2023	Mailchimp & Talkhouse	Listening	Webby	Podcasts, Music	Honoree
2024	Podcast: Solicited Advice with Alison Roman		Signal Award	General – Advice & How-To	Winner, Bronze
2024	Podcast: Talkhouse Podcast		Signal Award	General – Curators Shaping Culture	Winner, Bronze
2024	Podcast: That's How I Remember It with Craig Finn	"Jason Isbell"	Signal Award	General – Music	Winner, Bronze
2025	Podcast: Blank Check		iHeart Podcast Awards	Best Film & TV Podcast	Nominee

=== Other Recognitions ===
In 2018, the Talkhouse Podcast was featured in Variety as one of the top ten best music podcasts. In 2016 it was recognized as one of Entertainment Weekly's "12 Best Music Podcasts."

== See also ==
- Music podcast
