= Come Through with Rebecca Carroll =

Political podcast

Presentation
- Hosted by: Rebecca Carroll
- Language: American English
- Length: 30–45 Minutes

Production
- No. of seasons: 1
- No. of episodes: 15

Publication
- Original release: April 2 – July 7, 2020
- Provider: WNYC Studios

Related
- Related shows: This Land; There Goes the Neighborhood; Code Switch
- Website: www.wnycstudios.org/podcasts/come-through/

Come Through with Rebecca Carroll is a podcast about racism that is produced by WNYC Studios.

== Background ==
The show was produced in 2020 during a surge in hate crimes committed against Asian Americans, and the COVID-19 pandemic was disproportionately killing black people. The show discusses racism in the United States and how it effects every aspect of life. Carroll mainly interviews people of minority groups or more specifically BAME. Carroll interviewed Waubgeshig Rice about climate change. The show has included interviews with people such as Don Lemon, Robin DiAngelo, and Walter Mosley.

== Reception ==
Samantha Vincenty of Oprah Daily, compared the show to the WHYY-FM show Fresh Air.
