= The Realness (disambiguation) =

The Realness is a 2001 hip hop album by Cormega.

The Realness or Realness may also refer to:

- The Realness (podcast), 2018 audio documentary produced by WNYC studios
- Realness, 2015 studio album by RuPaul, or the song "The Realness"
- The Realness (RuPaul's Drag Race), season seven of RuPaul's drag race
- The Realness of Fortune Ball, season eight of RuPaul's drag race

== See also ==
- Redefining Realness
