= LeRoy Whitfield =

American journalist

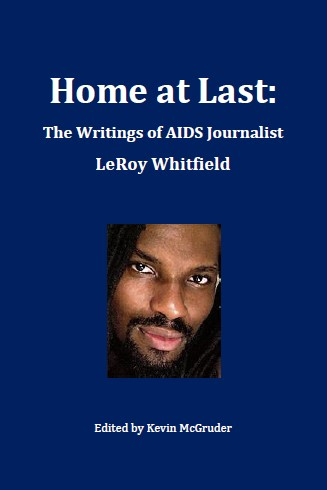
Cover of anthology of the writings of AIDS journalist LeRoy Whitfield (1969-2005)

LeRoy Whitfield (September 19, 1969 – October 9, 2005) was an African-American freelance journalist who chronicled his personal experience with HIV infection and AIDS. He was hailed by many as one of the nation's leading journalists reporting on AIDS in the African-American community.

Whitfield was born in Chicago, and pursued post-secondary studies at historically-Black Barber-Scotia College (Concord, NC), Northwestern University (Evanston, IL), University of Chicago, and DePaul University (Chicago, IL).

He was diagnosed with HIV during 1990 at the age of 19 and opted not to take antiretroviral medications due to their possible side effects ranging from fatigue and nausea to blurred vision. His doctors, though, advised otherwise. He had worries about clinic doctors who "just didn't get him".

After a Harvard Medical School researcher - "to understand specimens like me" - studied him as a longtime survivor of HIV who had never taken AIDS medications, Whitfield nicknamed himself "Marathon Man".

Whitfield wrote a column "Native Tongue" published monthly in HIV Plus magazine beginning May 2004. Due to the candor with which Whitfield shared his own fight against HIV in "Native Tongue", that column was one of the publication's most popular features recalled HIV Plus-editor Michael W.E. Edwards, who described Whitfield as a "consummate journalist - thorough, detailed, unafraid, and unapologetic in his approach to the topics he wrote about."

Whitfield, offering very candid looks into the most intimate parts of his life, invited readers to share in and learn from his personal experiences.

Commentator Keith Boykin reflected that Whitfield "was unusually committed to exposing the truth about AIDS in the Black community and he was unafraid to challenge conventional wisdom".

"Few people wrote as eloquently about being young, gifted and black - and same gender loving and HIV positive. LeRoy wrote with his heart and all his senses. He wasn't afraid to douse the page with his convictions or his vulnerability.", explained Poz-Editor Angelo Ragaza.

Whitfield was openly bi-sexual and - as Verena Dobnik of the Associated Press wrote - he "used his personal experience - including relationships with both men and women - as a prism on the larger issues surrounding HIV/AIDS,". He attributed the rise of HIV in the Black community to - among other factors - public housing, poverty and violence. However, he debunked the allegation voiced in some circles that AIDS was a White conspiracy to spread the disease among Blacks.

In a February 2001 New York Times interview, he said, "I don't think the larger AIDS groups give voice to the Black gay community. A lot of these men don't have a grip on what they're feeling sexually, and I don't think many of the organizations have a grasp on how to communicate with them."

In the September 1997 issue of Positively Aware magazine, Whitfield wrote "for African-Americans, AIDS is the atrocity du jour".

Whitfield also contributed to Ebony, Vibe, The Source, Chicago, City Limits, Black Lines, Kujisource magazines; and the New York Daily News, Chicago Defender newspapers.

Vibe magazine's Angelo Ragaza (also editor of Poz magazine) gave Whitfield a feature-article writing assignment which had Whitfield traveling to South Dakota State Penitentiary and interviewing Nikko Briteramos, a Black, 18-year-old, Si Tanka University (Huron, SD) freshman who was the first person convicted (2002) and imprisoned under South Dakota's HIV transmission law mandating that HIV-positive persons inform prospective sexual partners of their HIV-positive status. Whitfield's resulting Vibe (Vol. 11, No. 7) article was titled "A Dream Deferred". Vibe's Ragaza observed, "When LeRoy moved from personal essays to longer investigative pieces, I could tell it was a different kind of exercise for him. But it worked because LeRoy was his subject."

Whitfield, too, while in Chicago was an associate editor at magazine Positively Aware as well a community educator at AIDS-awareness-organization Positive Voice; and after moving to New York during 2000 was a columnist and senior editor at Poz - a magazine intended for people with HIV. He also was active with Los Angeles-based Black AIDS Institute and served as one of the founding members of the institute's journalism team.

Whitfield, having chosen to refuse antiretroviral therapy, struggled both physically and emotionally as his T-cell-count dropped, his HIV viral load climbed, and his health deteriorated.

In HIV Plus August 2005, Whitfield wrote: "I keep weighing potential side effects against the ill alternative - opportunistic infections - and I just can't decide which is worse. My T-cell count has plummeted to 40 - a dangerously all-time low - and my viral load has spiked to 230,000. I've argued against taking meds for so many years that now - with my numbers stacked against me - I find it hard to stop." He could not bring himself to take antiretroviral medication.

Over the years, Whitfield's decision to refuse antiretroviral therapy prompted anger in friends and other HIV-positive associates. He found himself abandoned by friends who were disgruntled and/or disgusted over his decision not to take meds. One such so-called friend told him: "now that you're so goddamn stubborn, I hope that something terrible happens to your health just to teach you a lesson."

Responding to the criticism, Whitfield wrote in what was to become his final HIV Plus (November 2005) column - "A Prayer for the Dying" - that he had grown tired of people "telling me - but never asking - what I need. If they asked, they'd know that this is the hardest medical decision I've ever had to make. And I feel very alone and afraid of making it. If they'd ever stop to ask, they'd know."

Whitfield died, age 36, of "AIDS-related complications" - kidney failure and pneumonia - in New York City at North General Hospital located in Harlem.

Phill Wilson, executive director of the Black AIDS Institute, wrote Whitfield's death "is yet another reminder that the AIDS epidemic is not over for Black folks in America. LeRoy's life and death with AIDS is a commentary on how complex HIV/AIDS in black face really is."

October 15, nearly a week after his death, Whitfield (posthumously) and his co-writer Kai Wright received a First Place "2005 Salute To Excellence Award" from the National Association of Black Journalists for their "AIDS Goes Gray" story in City Limits magazine.

The family's funeral/"homegoing" service in Chicago was held October 14 at Sweet Holy Spirit Church. On October 20, a New York City memorial service for Whitfield was held at National Black Theatre in Harlem.

Whifield's final resting place is Burr Oak Cemetery in Alsip, Illinois which contains gravesites of Emmett Till and many Black celebrities - including Chicago Blues musicians, athletes and other such notables.

On May 21, 2023; publisher Fire Press launched Home at Last: The Writings of AIDS Journalist LeRoy Whitfield, edited by Kevin McGruder.
