= Blindspot (podcast) =

History podcast from WNYC Studios

Blindspot is a podcast hosted by Kala Lea and produced by WNYC Studios. The first season was called The Road to 9/11 and the second season was called Tulsa Burning.

== Background ==
The podcast was produced by WNYC Studios and The History Channel. Season one was titled "Blindspot: The Road to 9/11" and season two was titled "Blindspot: Tulsa Burning". The podcast debuted on September 11, 2020. Season one was nine episodes long. Season one was hosted by Jim O'Grady. The second season debuted on May 28, 2021. The second season was six episodes long. The second season was hosted by KalaLea. Season two focused on the Tulsa race massacre. The season was created on the 100th anniversary of the massacre. One of the episodes in the season discusses The Greenwood District.

The podcast was compared to Slow Burn and Floodlines in Podcast Review.

=== Current Season ===
The third season was hosted by Kai Wright. Blindspot: The Plague in the Shadows looks at the early years of the AIDS epidemic, the places where HIV first took root, and the people who refused to stay out of sight. The sixth and final episode of season three airs on February 22, 2024.

=== Awards ===
Award	Date	Category	Recipient	Result	Ref.
Alfred I. duPont–Columbia University Award	2022	Podcast	Blindspot: "Tulsa Burning"	Won	
Rockie Awards	2022	Podcast: Non-Fiction	Blindspot: "Tulsa Burning"	Nominated	
Peabody Awards	2022	Podcast & Radio	Blindspot: "Tulsa Burning"	Nominated	
NAACP Image Award	2022	Outstanding Podcast – News and Information	Blindspot: "Tulsa Burning"	Won	
