= Zach Everson =

American journalist

- Occupations: Research director, journalist
- Employer: Public Citizen
- Awards: Lowell Thomas Award from the Society of American Travel Writers
- Website: 1100pennsylvania.com

Zach Everson is an American journalist and the research director for Public Citizen's Trump Accountability Project. He writes the 1100 Pennsylvania newsletter that reports on Donald Trump's alleged use of his presidency for personal gain. Everson previously worked for Forbes, and earlier in his career was a travel and food writer.

== Career ==
Everson has reported about the Trump Organization for publications including Vanity Fair, Politico, Slate, Mother Jones, and ProPublica and WNYC Studios' Trump, Inc. podcast.

As a travel writer, Everson reported on the Trump International Hotel Washington, D.C.'s opening for Fox News in October 2016 and later for Condé Nast Traveler. That article on the 2018 Lowell Thomas Gold Award for Travel News/Investigative Reporting from the Society of American Travel Writers. He later quit travel writing to report full-time on the Trump D.C. hotel. Everson often used open-source intelligence to identify customers at Trump properties. In Commentary, journalist Matthew Continetti complimented Everson's tracking of Trump's possible conflicts, but suggested Everson was playing to liberal biases.

As of February 2020, Everson had spotted 25 Trump cabinet members at the hotel and 32 of the 53 Republicans serving in the Senate. He also spotted representatives of at least 33 foreign countries through October 2010.

In 2021, after Trump's departure from the White House, Everson joined business magazine Forbes to cover campaign finance. In late August 2021, the Trump International Hotel in Washington banned Everson for life; he was told this was for taking photos without permission, Everson claimed this was retribution for unflattering coverage.

In February 2026, Everson became the research director for the Trump Accountability Project at Public Citizen, a non-profit progressive consumer rights advocacy group and think tank.
