= Fela Kuti: Fear No Man =

2025 podcast series about Fela Kuti

- Genre: oral history, music journalism, music history, biography
- Format: podcast, documentary
- Country of origin: United States
- Language: English

Cast and voices
- Hosted by: Jad Abumrad
- Voices: Ayo Edebiri; David Byrne; Brian Eno; Burna Boy; Questlove; Paul McCartney; Santigold; Barack Obama; Yeni Kuti; Femi Kuti; Made Kuti; Dele Sosimi

Production
- Production: Western Sound, Talkhouse
- Editing: Ben Adair
- Length: 23–56 minutes per episode

Publication
- No. of episodes: 12 (plus one bonus episode)
- Original release: September 18 – December 17, 2025
- Provider: Audible, Higher Ground
- Updates: Weekly (initial run)

Related
- Related shows: Radiolab, Dolly Parton's America
- Website: Higher Ground Media

Fela Kuti: Fear No Man is a twelve-episode podcast series about the life, music, and political activism of the Nigerian musician Fela Kuti, the pioneer of Afrobeat. Hosted by Jad Abumrad and produced by Western Sound and Talkhouse for Audible and Higher Ground Productions, it uses oral history and layered sound design to trace how Kuti's music challenged Nigeria's military government. The series won a Peabody Award and a Webby Award, and was included in year-end best-of lists by The New Yorker and The Economist.

== Background ==
Fela Anikulapo Kuti (1938–1997) is generally credited as the principal architect of Afrobeat, a genre built out of American jazz and funk fused with West African rhythm and Yoruba musical tradition. He his music to criticize Nigeria's postcolonial military rulers, most famously on the 1976 track "Zombie", which likened soldiers to mindless automatons following orders. The song was banned from radio and provoked a violent state response. Nigerian commentators describe "Zombie" as an important work of musical protest and cite the retaliation it drew as evidence of risks Kuti took.

The series was created by Jad Abumrad, who had previously made the Peabody-winning Dolly Parton's America after two decades on Radiolab. Abumrad said he wanted to present a full, sometimes contradictory picture of Kuti—"a movement builder, a cult leader, a groove weaver"—rather than produce a glowing biography.

== Production and release ==
Reporting took roughly three years and involved field work in Lagos. The team found handwritten protest songs from the archive of Kuti's mother, Funmilayo Ransome-Kuti, which had to be translated from phonetically spelled Yoruba before a choir could record them for the series.

The first two episodes were released exclusively on Audible on September 18, 2025, timed to coincide with the 25th anniversary of Felabration, the annual Lagos festival held in Kuti's honor. Those same episodes reached other podcast platforms on October 15—Kuti's birthday—with the remaining ten then released weekly.

== Content ==
Across its twelve episodes, the series moves from Kuti's classical training and his political awakening in the United States through his return to Nigeria and the invention of Afrobeat, told through a mix of oral history and musicology, rather than straight narration. The third episode, "Enter the Shrine," is built around a lengthy montage recreating the atmosphere of the Shrine, Kuti's Lagos nightclub and communal residence, and has been singled out by critics for its ambition. Other episodes turn to Funmilayo Ransome-Kuti's own history as a women's-rights organizer and trace her influence on her son's politics.

The show does not shy away from the harder parts of Kuti's biography. It covers his repeated arrests and the military raids on his compound in detail, but also gives time to his 1978 marriage to 27 of his backing singers and dancers in a single ceremony and his public refusal, even while dying, to accept that he had AIDS. Several of the women who were part of his household are interviewed directly, and their differing accounts of why they joined him and how they view him now.

== Reception ==
Reviews of the series were largely positive. It went on to make The New Yorker's year-end list of the best podcasts of 2025. The Economist also included it among its best podcasts of the year. In interviews, both NPR's Michel Martin and Terry Gross returned repeatedly to how much physical violence Kuti absorbed over his career, telling Abumrad it was hard to listen to.

The series collected a Peabody Award in the arts category; the Peabody board described it as managing "the delicate balance of being highly educational and wildly entertaining without lionizing its fearless hero." It also won the 2026 Webby Award for best limited series in podcasts.

=== Episodes ===
| No. | Title | Release date | Approx. length |
|---|---|---|---|
| 1 | "To Hell and Back" | October 15, 2025 | 38 min |
| 2 | "Becoming Fela" | October 15, 2025 | 56 min |
| 3 | "Enter the Shrine" | October 22, 2025 | 28 min |
| 4 | "Vengeance of the Vagina Head" | October 22, 2025 | 55 min |
| 5 | "Trickster Makes the World" | October 29, 2025 | 40 min |
| 6 | "The Queens" | November 5, 2025 | 46 min |
| 7 | "Teacher Don't Teach Me Nonsense" | November 12, 2025 | 42 min |
| 8 | "Zombie" | November 12, 2025 | 23 min |
| 9 | "Things Will Collide" | November 19, 2025 | 43 min |
| 10 | "Death in His Pouch" | December 3, 2025 | 44 min |
| 11 | "Endless Returns" | December 10, 2025 | 49 min |
| 12 | "Bloodline Covers" | December 17, 2025 | 42 min |
| 13 (bonus) | "African Counterpoint" | January 30, 2026 | 39 min |

== See also ==
- Fela Kuti
- Afrobeat
