= Indivisible (radio program) =

Political talk radio program

- Running time: 1 Hour
- Country of origin: The United States of America
- Language(s): American English
- Hosted by: Charlie Sykes; Brian Lehrer; Kerri Miller; Kai Wright
- Produced by: WNYC Studios; KNOW-FM; The Economist
- Original release: January 23, 2017
- No. of series: 1
- No. of episodes: 56
- Website: www.wnyc.org/shows/indivisible
- Podcast: http://feeds.wnyc.org/indivisibleradio

Indivisible was a political radio program hosted in 2017 during the beginnings of Donald Trump's presidency. The show was produced by WNYC Studios, KNOW-FM, and The Economist.

== Background ==
The radio show featured call-in discussions four nights a week throughout Donald Trump's first one hundred days as President of the United States. Charlie Sykes, the conservative host, would host the show on Wednesday nights. Kai Wright discussed topics that built on the themes established in The United States of Anxiety. Kerri Miller hosts the show on Thursday nights to discuss American identity. Similar shows include Code Switch, Pod Save the World, and Slate Political Gabfest.
