= Caught: The Lives of Juvenile Justice =

Podcast on mass incarceration in the US

- Genre: History podcast; Political podcast
- Language: American English

Cast and voices
- Hosted by: Kai Wright

Production
- Length: 30-45 Minutes

Publication
- No. of seasons: 1
- No. of episodes: 9 + Bonus Episodes
- Original release: March 12, 2018
- Provider: WNYC Studios
- Updates: Thrice Weekly

Related
- Related shows: Ear Hustle; Truth & Justice
- Website: www.wnycstudios.org/podcasts/caught

Caught: The Lives of Juvenile Justice is a political and history podcast that focuses on mass incarceration in the United States. The show is produced by WNYC Studios and hosted by Kai Wright.

== Background ==
The show discusses issues concerning mental health. Incarceration disproportionately affects black and brown people in the United States, who are the primary subjects of the podcast.

The first episode discusses the story of a sixteen year old black boy called "Z". In the episode entitled "You Just Sit There And Wait For The Next Day To Come", the continued use of solitary confinement is discussed.

== Reception ==
The New Yorker included the show on their list of "The Best Podcasts of 2018". The show won a Silver Baton in the 2019 duPont-Columbia Awards. The show was an honoree in the 2019 Webby Awards.
