= Kai Wright =

American journalist and podcast host

Kai Wright is an American journalist, activist, author, and podcast host. He has served as copy editor at the New York Daily News, senior writer at The Root, senior editor at City Limits, editorial director at ColorLines, and features editor at The Nation. Wright's journalism has focused on social, racial, and economic justice. His writing has appeared in The New York Times, Mother Jones, and Salon, among other outlets, and his national broadcast appearances include MSNBC and NPR. He is the current host and managing editor of Notes from America with Kai Wright on WNYC.

== Career ==
Kai Wright began his career as a journalist in the late '90s at the Washington Blade. His first assignment was a story looking at the disproportionate risk of HIV infection among people of color, and particularly young gay men of color. He then spent much of his early career writing about impact of HIV/AIDS on young gay men of color.

Wright went on to become a favorite reporter at Type Investigations (formerly The Investigative Fund) where he covered economic inequality, access to healthcare, and racial inequity. At the same time he became an Alfred Knobler Fellow at its parent organization, The Nation Institute.

Wright gained notoriety in the HIV prevention world as he, while writing as a columnist and later senior writer at The Root, he served as publications editor for the Black AIDS Institute.

He spent time as senior editor at City Limits, copy editor at the New York Daily News, and news reporter at The Washington Blade before joining ColorLines in 2010, initially as editorial and later as, editor-at-large He is credited with transforming the publication from a bimonthly print journal to a daily digital destination reaching 1 million readers a month.

In 2015, Wright was persuaded to join The Nation as a features editor, making it, at the time, one of the few political magazines with people of color in senior leadership. Wright edited the magazine's features, investigative reports, and editorials, helped cultivate new talent, and developed new digital ventures. The magazine looked to him to enhance coverage in his areas of expertise - issues of race and racial justice, inequality, labor, health, and sexuality.

While features editor at The Nation, Wright began hosting the podcast "The United States of Anxiety" in partnership with WNYC Studios.

Since becoming managing editor at WNYC and host of its narrative unit, Wright has hosted the podcasts Indivisible, Caught: The Lives of Juvenile Justice, There Goes the Neighborhood, The Stakes and United States of Anxiety

Outside of his home publications, his writing has appeared in In These Times, Truthout, Common Dreams, Essence magazine, and Mother Jones.

== Personal life ==
Wright is a native of Indianapolis, Indiana and lives in Brooklyn, New York.

== Bibliography ==
=== Black AIDS Institute Publications ===
- 2005 The Time Is Now!
- 2006 AIDS in Blackface: 25 Years of an Epidemic
- 2006 The Way Forward: The State of AIDS in Black America
- 2008 Saving Ourselves: The State of AIDS in Black America
- 2008 Left Behind! Black America: A Neglected Priority in the Global AIDS Epidemic
- 2011 AIDS: 30 Years Is Enuf! The History of the AIDS Epidemic in Black America, 2011

=== Prose and other projects ===
- Drifting Toward Love: Black, Brown, Gay Coming of Age on the Streets of New York
- The African American Experience: Black History and Culture Through Speeches, Letters, Editorials, Poems, Songs, and Stories
- Soldiers of Freedom: An Illustrated History of African Americans in the Armed Forces
- The African American Experience: Black History and Culture Through Speeches, Letters, Editorials, Poems, Songs, and Stories. (Editor)

== Awards ==
- National Association of Black Journalists 2005 Salute to Excellence - Winner
  - "AIDS Goes Gray" LeRoy Whitfield (posthumously), Kai Wright City Limits magazine
- 18th GLAAD Media Awards (2007), Outstanding Digital Journalism Article - nominee
  - "Is Fear the Best Way to Fight AIDS?" Kai Wright TheNation
- Randy Shilts Award 2009
  - Drifting Toward Love: Black, Brown, Gay Coming of Age on the Streets of New York
- 21st Lambda Literary Award 2009 for Nonfiction - finalist
  - Drifting Toward Love: Black, Brown, Gay Coming of Age on the Streets of New York
- National Association of Black Journalists 2012 Salute to Excellence - Winner
  - Digital Media – Single Story: News - "Deadly Secrets: How California Law Shields Oakland Police Violence" Ali Winston, Esther Kaplan, Kai Wright - ColorLines
- Peabody Award 2024
  - Blindspot: The Plague in the Shadows
