= Trump, Inc. =

Investigative podcast about Donald Trump

Publication
- Provider: WNYC

Trump, Inc. was an investigative podcast by WNYC Studios devoted to unreported new stories related to Donald Trump and his family, particularly their business dealings.

The podcast premiered in February 2018 and its final episode was released on January 19, 2021, the last full day of Donald Trump's first term.

The podcast originated in an article published in an October 2017 issue of the New Yorker which detailed how Ivanka Trump and Donald Trump Jr. avoided a federal indictment for "misleading prospective buyers" of units in the Trump SoHo development. The podcast continued the research that produced the New Yorker story and then expanded to cover other controversial activities by the Trump family.

== See also ==
- Political podcast
