= La Brega =

Podcast about Puerto Rico

La Brega: Stories of the Puerto Rican Experience is a seven part bilingual podcast produced in collaboration by WNYC Studios and Futuro Studios and hosted by Alana Casanova-Burgess. The show explores Puerto Rican culture and history and is created and produced by Puerto Ricans including the music and illustrations.

== Background ==
The podcast is hosted by Alana Casanova-Burgess and produced in collaboration by WNYC Studios and Futuro Studios. The show debuted on February 24, 2021. The show is a seven part series produced in both English and Spanish that explores Puerto Rican culture and history. There are some notable differences between the English episodes and Spanish episodes such as cultural and historical references that are only made in the Spanish episodes.

The phrase "la brega" means "the struggle", which is a common expression in Puerto Rico and describes the Puerto Rican mindset to struggle against adversity and injustice. The first episode includes interviews with Puerto Ricans who explain what the phrase means to them. The show discusses how potholes are a serious problem in Puerto Rico and how communities have addressed the problem.

The show was renewed for a second season. The second series debuted on January 26, 2023.

The show's soundtrack includes songs by well known Puerto Rican musical artists such as Xenia Rubinos. The soundtrack was released as an EP on April 11, 2023. The podcast's illustrations were also done by Puerto Rican artists.

On October 5, 2023, WNYC canceled the podcast in the midst of a broader cost-cutting effort.
