= Everson =

Everson may refer to:

== People ==
- Everson (name), a list of people with the name

== Places ==
- Everson, Pennsylvania
- Everson, Washington

== Other uses ==
- Everson aircraft and automobiles
- Everson Museum of Art in Syracuse, New York

== See also ==
- Everson v. Board of Education
