= Manoush Zomorodi =

American journalist

- Zomorodi at Boston Book Festival in 2026
- Born: 1973 (age 52–53)
- Education: Georgetown University
- Occupation: Journalist
- Website: www.manoushz.com

Manoush Zomorodi is an American journalist, podcast host and author. She was the host of the WNYC podcast Note to Self, which explores humans' relationship with technology through conversations with listeners and experts. In 2018, Zomorodi quit WNYC to start a media company, Stable Genius Productions, with her colleague Jen Poyant. The process of starting their company is documented in the podcast ZigZag, which is also their first production. As of March 2020, she is the host of NPR's TED Radio Hour.

== Early life ==
Zomorodi, who is of part Iranian and Swiss descent, was born in New York City, and studied English and Fine Arts at Georgetown University.

== Career ==
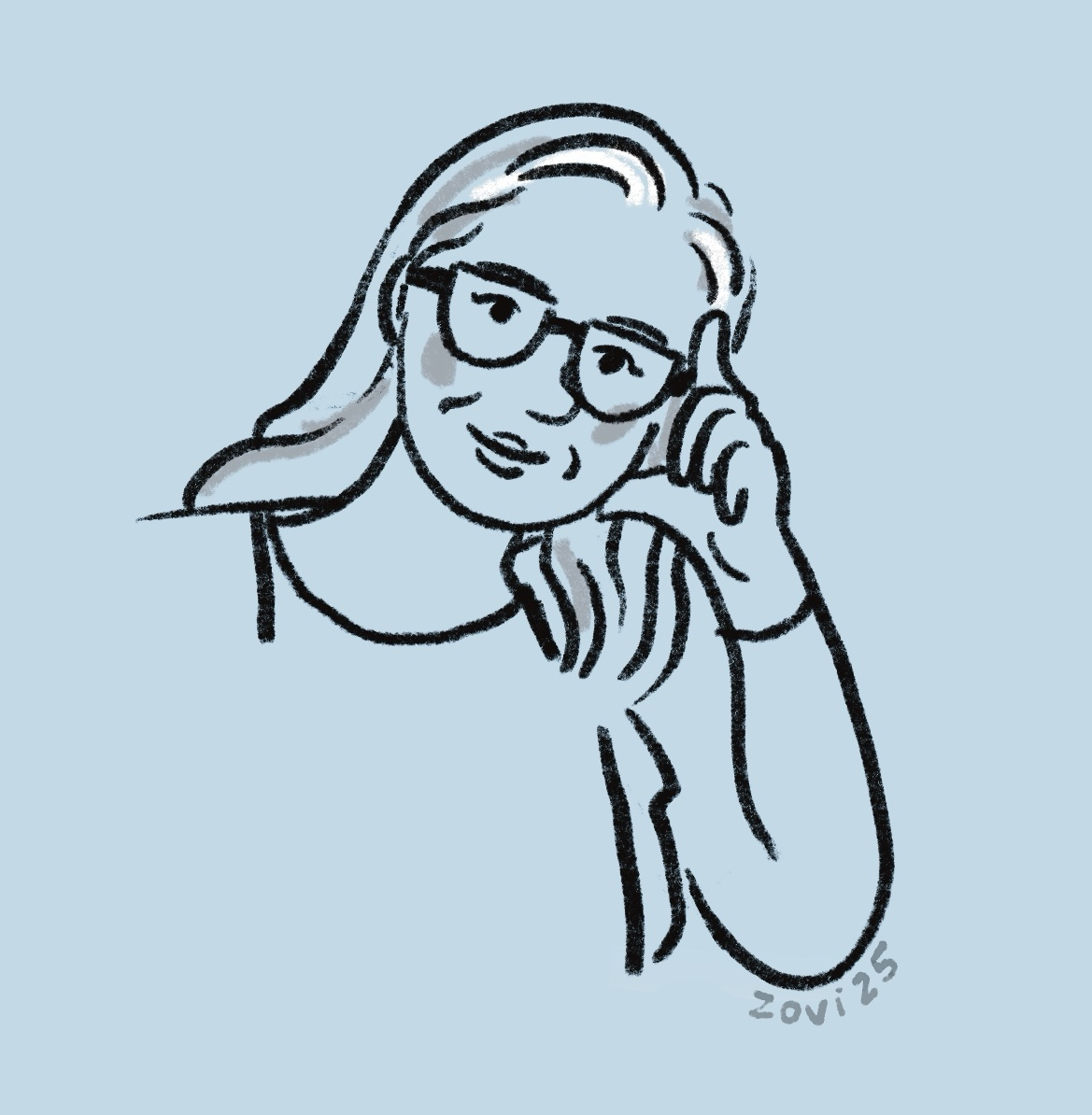
Sketch of Zomorodi from October 2025.

Zomorodi began her career as a reporter and producer at Thomson Reuters and BBC News. During this time, she lived in Berlin for two years.

=== Note to Self ===
In September 2012, Zomorodi began hosting a new podcast at WNYC called New Tech City. The name was changed in 2015 to Note to Self. Zomorodi described the show as "the tech show about being Human".

The podcast covered a range of topics ranging from information overload and digital clutter, to sexting, and the eavesdropping capabilities of our gadgets. In 2017, Zomorodi teamed up with ProPublica to launch "Breaking the Black Box", an investigation into Facebook's collection of their users' personal data. This was followed by "The Privacy Paradox", a five-part podcast and audience engagement series that aimed to help Facebook users to take control of their own data. This project won a Webby Award in the Podcasts & Digital Audio category in 2018.

It was named Best Tech Podcast of 2017 by the Academy of Podcasters.

=== Stable Genius Productions ===
In 2018, Zomorodi quit WNYC, along with Jen Poyant, Executive Producer for Note to Self. The two of them started a media company called "Stable Genius Productions", a reference to a tweet by President Donald Trump. The first project by the new company was a documentary podcast ZigZag, which documented the early days of the company itself. The podcast covers their attempts to obtain funding for their company, ideas for new projects, and discussions by both co-founders about the financial risk they were taking, and the effect of running the startup on their personal lives. The podcast was initially broadcast as part of the Radiotopia network.

After their initial funding fell through, Zomorodi and Poyant partnered with Civil, a marketplace that used blockchain technology to distribute news but Civil shut down in 2020. With COVID-19 shutting down advertising funding in early 2020, Stable Genius Productions did not have the financial runway to continue producing the podcast as a partnership.

=== TED Radio Hour ===
Zomorodi was named the host of the TED Radio Hour in November 2019. She has continued her approach of engaging with audience members to gather data about the impact of technology on their lifestyles through projects like "Body Electric", which studied how taking movement breaks affect peoples' bodies.

=== Other work ===
Zomorodi is the author of the books Bored and Brilliant: How Spacing Out Can Unlock Your Most Productive and Creative Self and Camera Ready: How to Present Your Best Self and Ideas On Air and Online. She also hosted the fourth and fifth seasons of the IRL Podcast from Mozilla Firefox.

== Awards and recognition ==
Zomorodi has won numerous journalism awards including the New York Press Club Award for Journalism. She was also named Outstanding Host in 2014 by the Alliance of Women in Media. In 2018, she was listed as one of the "100 Most Creative People in Business" by Fast Company.

== Personal life ==
She is married to television reporter Josh Robin, with whom she has two children and lives in New York City.
