= Free Shakespeare on the Radio =

Radio drama (2020)

Presentation
- Hosted by: Vinson Cunningham
- Starring: André Holland
- Developed by: Ed Haber; George Wellington; Jared Paul; Joe Plourde
- Written by: William Shakespeare
- Directed by: Saheem Ali
- Voices: Barzin Akhavan; Sean Carvajal; Michael Bradley Cohen; Sanjit De Silva; Biko Eisen-Martin; Michael Gaston; Stephen McKinley Henderson; Miriam A. Hyman; Merritt Janson; Elijah Jones; Dakin Matthews; Jacob Ming-Trent; Maria Mukuka; Lupita Nyong'o; Okwui Okpokwasili; Estelle Parsons; Tom Pecinka; Phylicia Rashad; Reza Salazar; Thom Sesma; Sathya Sridharan; John Douglas Thompson; Claire van der Boom; Natalie Woolams-Torres; Ja'Siah Young; Saheem Ali; Arabella Powell; Raz Golden
- Language: American English
- Length: 60 Minutes

Production
- Direction: Isaac Jones
- Production: Emily Mann; Emily Botein; Elliott Forrest; Matt Collette; Sarah Sandbach
- Composed by: Michael Thurber
- No. of seasons: 1
- No. of episodes: 4

Publication
- Original release: July 8 – July 16, 2020
- Provider: WNYC Studios and The Public Theater

Related
- Website: www.wnycstudios.org/podcasts/free-shakespeare-podcast-richard-ii/

Free Shakespeare on the Radio was a radio drama and podcast starring André Holland and Lupita Nyong'o which was produced by WNYC Studios and The Public Theater.

== Background ==
The performance was originally being produced as a stage performance at the Delacorte Theater as part of the Free Shakespeare in the Park series but was canceled due to the COVID-19 pandemic and was adapted into a radio drama instead. The audio production was produced by WNYC Studios and The Public Theater and stars André Holland and Lupita Nyong'o. The recording was done over Zoom.

== Reception ==
The show was included on The New York Times list of "5 Podcasts to Bring Theater Into Your Home". The show was included on IndieWire list of "The Podcasts of 2020: A Tribute".
