= Rejection Therapy =

Social self-help game

- Rejection Therapy logo

Rejection Therapy is a social self-help game created by Jason Comely where being rejected by another person or group is the sole winning condition. The player can attempt any kind of social rejection, or try a suggestion from one of the Rejection Therapy suggestion cards available. The game can be played for any length of time, although many undertake the 30-Day Challenge.

The purpose of playing the game is to overcome the fear of rejection through controlled, forced exposure. By this means, players hope to adapt physically to the stresses of rejection.

Rejection Therapy is currently owned by Jia Jiang.

== Gameplay ==
=== Rules ===
There is only one official rule to Rejection Therapy, which is to be rejected by another person at least once, every day. There are also stipulations as to what counts as a rejection and what does not:

1. A rejection counts if you are out of your comfort zone
2. A rejection counts if your request is denied
3. At the time of rejection, the player, not the respondent, should be in a position of vulnerability. The player should be sensitive to the feelings of the person being asked.

=== Strategies ===
Some players develop strategies and coping mechanisms for managing the fear before a rejection attempt, such as mindfulness or using the three second rule. New players are advised to start with small rejections before graduating to more emotionally and socially meaningful rejections.

== Psychology ==
Rejection Therapy shares components with exposure therapy, an evidence-based treatment modality within the CBT framework. The game resembles many behavior changing techniques that constitute modern psychotherapy, with the playful "gamification" being an added feature.

== Social media ==
Rejection therapy gained exposure on social media, where a community on TikTok was committing to getting rejected intentionally. The hashtag #rejectiontherapy has almost four million views and features people approaching strangers with strange requests to get a no as an answer. Some had fun with the month-long challenge; others treated it as part of exposure therapy for their irrational fear of rejection.

== Acquisition ==
In 2012, Jia Jiang, an American entrepreneur, came across the game while going through a period of self-doubt after an investor dropped out from his project Hooplus, a social media to-do list app. Crushed by rejection, he was seeking ways to cope with rejection but soon concluded that the fear of rejection was a bigger obstacle than rejection itself.

Jiang was so inspired by the idea behind Rejection Therapy that he took it 70 steps further, creating 100 challenges for himself. Jiang documented the daily challenges of getting rejected in a blog and video series titled 100 Days of Rejection Therapy. His request to get Krispy Kreme doughnuts in the shape of Olympic rings went viral on social media.

In 2016, Jiang ultimately acquired Rejection Therapy.
