= How Long Gone (podcast) =

- Genre: Culture, interview
- Language: English

Cast and voices
- Hosted by: Chris Black and Jason Stewart

Publication
- Original release: 2020
- Provider: Talkhouse

Related
- Website: howlonggone.com

How Long Gone is an American podcast hosted by Chris Black and Jason Stewart. It began in 2020 during the COVID-19 pandemic. Episodes usually feature Black and Stewart talking with each other before interviewing a guest, with conversations often covering music, fashion, restaurants, travel and media.

The show is distributed by Talkhouse and releases three episodes per week.

== History ==
Black and Stewart had known each other for more than a decade before starting the show. Stewart previously hosted Tall Tales, where Black appeared as a guest. Black said the idea for How Long Gone began as a joke on Twitter during the first months of the pandemic.

The podcast started while the two were staying home during the pandemic and wanted a reason to talk regularly with each other and their friends. Vogue reported later in 2020 that the show had reached about 150,000 monthly listeners.

By February 2023, more than 450 episodes had been released.

The show later joined the Talkhouse podcast network.

== Format ==
Episodes generally begin with Black and Stewart talking before a guest joins the show. Interviews are loose and conversational, with topics ranging from music and fashion to food, travel and media.

The Guardian described the show as combining comedy, long-form interviews and commentary on the social and cultural scenes discussed by the hosts.

== Reception ==
In 2023, The Guardian called How Long Gone a "wildly popular chatshow".

British GQ profiled Black and Stewart the same year, focusing on the show's audience and interview style.

== Video series ==
In 2026, Talkhouse and Amplify Pictures launched How Long Gone Today, a studio-produced video series based on the podcast. The series features conversations, guest interviews and musical performances, and was distributed through YouTube and Spotify Video.

== Other media ==
In November 2025, Black and Stewart co-hosted GQ's Men of the Year red carpet livestream with Quenlin Blackwell.
