= Adulting (podcast) =

Comedy podcast

- Genre: Comedy podcast
- Language: American English

Creative team
- Creative director: Joe Plourde

Cast and voices
- Hosted by: Michelle Buteau and Jordan Carlos

Production
- Production: Paula Szuchman; Blakeney Schick; Joanna Solotaroff; Odelia Rubin
- Length: 30–45 minutes

Publication
- Original release: May 21 – September 3, 2019
- Provider: WNYC Studios

Related
- Website: www.wnycstudios.org/podcasts/adulting/

Adulting is a comedy podcast hosted by Michelle Buteau and Jordan Carlos and produced by WNYC Studios.

== Background ==
The show is a comedy podcast hosted by Michelle Buteau and Jordan Carlos and produced by WNYC Studios. The show explores what it means to grow up. The first episode debuted on May 21, 2019. The show released episodes on a weekly basis.

The show did a live event featuring Padma Lakshmi, Amber Ruffin and Dan Ahdoot in New York City at the Bell House on February 25, 2019. They did an event at 92nd Street Y.

== Format ==
The show includes standup, advice, and interviews with guests. It is always performed in front of a live audience. Each episode is about thirty to forty minutes long.

== Reception ==
The show was included on Oprah Daily, Marie Claire, Vulture, and Time as one of the best podcasts of 2019.
