= 10 Things That Scare Me =

Podcast by WNYC Studios

10 Things That Scare Me is a podcast created by Amy Pearl and Paula Szuchman and produced by WNYC Studios. In each short episode a guest goes through a list of things that scares them.

== Background ==
The podcast is produced by WNYC Studios. The show does not have a host or interviewer, instead the guest provides a stream of consciousness or monologue. However, episodes introductions are done by Amy Pearl. Paula Szuchman had her children record a list of things they were scared of because they seemed to be afraid of everything at the time. Szuchman shared the recordings with Pearl which provided the inspiration for the show. The episodes are intentionally short at about six minutes each. The show produces shorter episodes because the number of available podcasts is overwhelming and according to Edison Research listeners have become less likely to finish podcast episodes. Episodes are released every Tuesday, Wednesday, and Thursday. In each episode the guest is asked to list the things that scare them and their answers can range in tone from funny to serious. The show includes episodes dedicated to listener submitted entries. The fears presented in the show can occasionally be very specific to the speaker, however, the fears are more often relatable and share similarities with fears from other guests on the show.
