= The Realness (podcast) =

WNYC music podcast

- Genre: Music podcast
- Language: American English

Creative team
- Developed by: Cayce Means; Christopher Werth; Kathy Iandoli; Jared Paul; Merritt Jacob

Cast and voices
- Hosted by: Mary Harris; Christopher M. Johnson

Production
- Length: 30 Minutes

Publication
- No. of seasons: 1
- No. of episodes: 6
- Original release: July 19 – August 3, 2018
- Provider: WNYC Studios

Related
- Related shows: Only Human
- Website: www.wnycstudios.org/podcasts/realness/

The Realness is a music podcast hosted by Mary Harris and Christopher M. Johnson and produced by WNYC Studios.

== Background ==
The show is about the life of Albert Johnson, also known as Prodigy of Mobb Deep. Mobb Deep grew famous in the 1990s with hits like "Shook Ones (Part II)" and their 1995 studio album The Infamous. Prodigy struggled with sickle cell disease his whole life and was an advocate for people with the disease. More than 4 million people in the world suffer from Sickle Cell. Prodigy died at the age of 42 on June 20, 2017, due to complications related to the disease. The podcast discusses recently discovered medical records and contains exclusive audio of Prodigy discussing his experiences with sickle cell disease. The show also features interviews with Ali Shaheed Muhammad of A Tribe Called Quest, Dr. Dre, Matty C of The Source, Peter Rosenberg from Hot 97, and Roxanne Shante.

The six episode podcast was produced by WNYC Studios and hosted by health reporters Mary Harris and Christopher Johnson. In July 2018 Universal Music Enterprises commemorated the 25th anniversary of Juvenile Hell by releasing it on vinyl. The podcast featured interviews with his brother Greg Johnson, his former doctors such as Yvette Francis-McBarnette, and Big Twins. The podcast discusses the history of how sickle cell disease received national attention at the time that Prodigy was born. The show also discusses how the disease disproportionately affects black people and the societal racism that has led to the disease largely being ignored. The hosts look at how sickle cell effected Prodigy's life and music.

The show traces the history of sickle cell disease in general while foscusing on Prodigy's experience in particular. The first episode introduces the listener to Prodigy and the second episode looks at the historical moment in which Prodigy was born. Episode three discusses Prodigy's family and their various musical influences.

== Episodes ==
=== Introductory episode ===
Title	Running time	Original release date
"Introducing The Realness: The Untold story of Albert "Prodigy" Johnson"	3:55	July 16, 2018

=== Season 1 ===
No.	Title	Running time	Original release date
1	"This Sunny Day Right Here"	31:05	July 19, 2018
2	"T'Chaka"	30:21	July 28, 2018
3	"Son, They Shook"	23:57	July 30, 2018
B–Side	"Roxanne Shante"	19:14	August 1, 2018
4	"The Most Racist Judge in Nassau County"	36:01	August 3, 2018
5	"Go See About the God"	32:03	August 6, 2018
6	"Missing You"	30:51	August 10, 2018

== Reception ==
The podcast won the 2019 National Association of Black Journalists award for best lifestyle podcast.

== See also ==
- List of music podcasts
