= Dolly Parton's America =

Limited series documentary podcast

- Genre: music journalism; music history; biography
- Format: podcast, documentary
- Country of origin: United States
- Language: English

Creative team
- Created by: Jad Abumrad; Shima Oliaee

Cast and voices
- Hosted by: Jad Abumrad; Shima Oliaee
- Starring: Dolly Parton

Production
- Production: Jad Abumrad; Shima Oliaee
- Length: 30–60 minutes per episode

Publication
- No. of episodes: 9 (plus two bonus episodes)
- Original release: October 15 – December 31, 2019
- Provider: WNYC Studios; Osm Audio
- Updates: Completed

Related
- Related shows: The Vanishing of Harry Pace
- Website: WNYC Studios

Dolly Parton's America is a 2019 podcast hosted by Jad Abumrad and reported and produced by Shima Oliaee at WNYC Studios. It is a nine-part non-fiction series based on Dolly Parton's career and enduring legacy. The series begins with how Abumrad learned that his father, Naji Abumrad, a doctor, had befriended Parton after she survived a minor traffic accident. Abumrad sought out an introduction to Parton in an effort to understand how she remains one of the most popular and well respected musicians in America. Each episode covers a different aspect of Parton's career, from her early life, to her unique approach to politics, her most famous songs and creation of the Dollywood theme park. The name of the podcast was based on a history class Oliaee connected with at the University of Tennessee - Knoxville, titled Dolly Parton's America, taught by Dr. Lynn Sacco.

== Reception ==
Dolly Parton's America received largely positive responses from most mainstream media, including NPR, The Guardian, Vulture and others. The New York Times called it "a genial, compulsively listenable crash course in Parton's lasting appeal."

=== Awards ===
Award	Date	Category	Result	Ref.
New York Festivals Radio Awards	2020	Narrative/Documentary Podcast	Gold	
Peabody Award	2019	Podcast/Radio	Won	
iHeartRadio Podcast Awards	2021	Best Music Podcast	Won	
iHeartRadio Podcast Awards	2021	Podcast of the Year	Nominated	
Webby Awards	2020	Podcasts - Best Limited Series	Won	
Webby Awards	2020	People's Voice Winner	Won	

== Episodes ==
Season One
Episode	Title	Original Release Date
1	"Sad Ass Songs"	October 15, 2019
2	"I Will Always Leave You"	October 22, 2019
3	"Tennessee Mountain Trance"	October 29, 2019
4	"Neon Moss"	November 5, 2019
5	"Dollitics"	November 12, 2019
Bonus	Live Music from the Series	November 26, 2019
6	"The Only One For Me, Jolene"	November 19, 2019
7	"Dolly Parton's America"	December 3, 2019
8	"Dixie Disappearance"	December 17, 2019
Bonus	Live Music from the Series	December 24, 2019
9	"She's Alive"	December 31, 2019

== See also ==
- Music podcast
- List of music podcasts
