= Chris Black (podcaster) =

American podcaster, writer, and creative consultant

- Born: 1982 (age 43–44); Atlanta, Georgia, U.S.
- Occupations: Podcaster, writer, creative consultant

Chris Black (born 1982) is an American podcaster, writer and creative consultant. He co-hosts How Long Gone with Jason Stewart and is the founder of the consultancy Done To Death Projects. His consulting clients have included J.Crew, Thom Browne and Stüssy.

Black has written for GQ and New York. He formerly wrote the Pulling Weeds column for GQ and Ask Chris Black for The Strategist. In 2025, he launched the clothing label Hanover.

== Career ==
Black was born in Atlanta, Georgia, and grew up in Conyers, Georgia. He worked in retail before entering the music business. In 2003, he became the manager of Atlanta pop-punk band Cartel, whose members he knew from Conyers. He worked with the band during the period in which it signed a record deal and appeared on the MTV series Band in a Bubble. Black later moved into creative consulting and founded Done To Death Projects.

=== Podcast ===
In 2020, Black and Jason Stewart started How Long Gone during the COVID-19 pandemic. The idea began as a joke between the two on Twitter. By February 2023, the podcast had released more than 450 episodes. The show's name comes from the Brooks & Dunn song "How Long Gone". In 2021, the podcast began performing live shows and released the compilation album Adds Colour through Jagjaguwar.

=== Writing and photography ===
Black has contributed to publications including GQ, New York, Vogue, Interview and Highsnobiety. He has also published photography zines. Good Morning, Good Night was released in 2024 with a launch at Ursula in New York. His book I Know You Think You Know It All was published in 2015.

=== Clothing label ===
In December 2025, Black launched Hanover, a clothing label producing its initial collection in the United States. The collection included T-shirts, polos, Oxford shirts and denim.
