= WNYC Studios =

Podcast network

- Type: Subsidiary
- Industry: Media
- Genre: Podcasts
- Founded: October 13, 2015; 11 years ago
- Headquarters: New York City, United States
- Key people: Christy Tanner (CEO)
- Products: Consider This; More Perfect; The New Yorker Radio Hour; On the Media; Radiolab; Science Friday
- Parent: New York Public Radio
- Website: wnycstudios.wnyc.org wnyckids.org

WNYC Studios is a producer and distributor of podcasts and on-demand and broadcast audio. WNYC Studios is a subsidiary of New York Public Radio and is headquartered in New York City.

== History ==
In May 2015, WNYC began distributing its shows Radiolab and On The Media. WNYC Studios was founded on October 13, 2015, with an inventory of 17 podcasts and national radio shows.

The venture is funded with a diversified model consisting of philanthropy, membership and sponsorship.

The first podcast launched by WNYC Studios was The New Yorker Radio Hour, a co-production with The New Yorker magazine. Hosted by The New Yorker editor David Remnick, the national radio show and podcast debuted on October 24, 2015.

On March 29, 2016, WNYC Studios announced the launch of the 2 Dope Queens podcast hosted by The Daily Show's Jessica Williams, and Broad City's Phoebe Robinson. 2 Dope Queens premiered on April 5, 2016. On April 6, 2016, 2 Dope Queens reached #1 on the iTunes chart.

In late 2017, WNYC Studios launched two new podcasts for kids: This Podcast Has Fleas and Pickle (produced with ABC Australia).

== Current shows ==
Title	Host(s)	Genre
Consider This	Janae Pierre	News
More Perfect	Julia Longoria	Law and current events
The New Yorker Radio Hour	David Remnick	Interview talk show
On the Media	Brooke Gladstone	News (media analysis)
Radiolab	Lulu Miller and Latif Nasser	Scientific, philosophical investigation
Science Friday	Ira Flatow	Science
Notes from America with Kai Wright	Kai Wright	Social Issues
Terrestrials	Lulu Miller	Kids & family

=== Consider This ===
Launched in September 2020, Consider This is a shortform daily news podcast from WNYC and NPR. Hosted by Janae Pierre, the show offers a mix of the day's top local stories from WNYC and national stories from NPR. It releases each weekday at 5pm ET. WNYC was part of the pilot group of twelve public radio stations across ten U.S. region that NPR tapped to bundle local news content with the national Consider This podcast that was launched in June 2020.

=== More Perfect ===
Officially titled Radiolab Presents: More Perfect, the series was the first spinoff series from Radiolab, debuting in 2016. Hosted by Jad Abumrad, it explored how the Supreme Court's rulings shape the lives of Americans, as well as telling the stories behind some of the Court's most significant rulings. The three seasons aired from June 2016 to December 2018. The show relaunched with a new host, Julia Longoria, in May 2023. The New Yorker has hailed the series as being "subtly astonishing...both sobering in its thoughtful investigations of the United States government's unfairness to many of its own citizens and quietly optimistic in its desire to make us understand." The series won the American Bar Association's Silver Gavel Award in 2017.

=== The New Yorker Radio Hour ===
The New Yorker Radio Hour is a co-production of The New Yorker and WNYC Studios. It is hosted by David Remnick, who has been editor of The New Yorker since 1998. The hour-long national broadcast show and podcast is based on conversation, debate, humor, and regularly features writers, editors and cartoonists from The New Yorker.

=== On the Media ===
On the Media is an hour-long weekly radio program and podcast, hosted by Brooke Gladstone, covering journalism, technology and First Amendment issues.

On the Media launched in 1995 and was reformatted and relaunched in 2001, and since then has been one of WNYC Studios' fastest growing programs, with more than 400 public radio stations broadcasting the show weekly. It won a Peabody Award in 2004 for providing listeners "an insightful journey into the inner workings and outer effects of the media". In 2013, co-host Brooke Gladstone won a Gracie Award for Outstanding Host. The episode "Bench Press," which looked at the Supreme Court and its relationship with the media, won both a New York Press Club Award and the American Bar Association's Silver Gavel Award in 2016. In 2023, On the Media won a Peabody Award for its series "The Divided Dial,” which "offers listeners a [ ] window into the rise of Salem Media Group, a conservative Christian radio network."

=== Radiolab ===
Radiolab was created in 2002 by Jad Abumrad. Robert Krulwich joined as co-host in 2005. The radio program and podcast explores broad, difficult topics such as "time" and "morality" in an accessible and light-hearted manner and with a distinctive audio production style.

Radiolab received a 2007 National Academies Communication Award "for their imaginative use of radio to make science accessible to broad audiences". The program has received two Peabody Awards; first in 2010 and again in 2014. In 2015 the episode "60 Words," which looked at the language used in the Authorization for Use of Military Force (AUMF), won a Headliner Award, a New York Press Club Award, and was the New York Festivals' Gold Radio Winner and Grand Award Winner. Also in 2015, the episode "Galapagos" won first place in the Society of Environmental Journalists Awards for Reporting on the Environment. The episode "Sight Unseen" won the Gold Award for Best Documentary from Third Coast Festival.

In 2011, Abumrad received the MacArthur grant.

The show has done several special multi-episode series exploring various areas. "Border Trilogy" was a three-part series that explored the United States Border Patrol's policy "Prevention Through Deterrence." The "Gonads" series, hosted by Molly Webster, looked at aspects of reproduction, fertility, and gender. "In the No" was a three-part series that looked at consent in the wake of #MeToo. "G" was a six-part series that explored the controversial science of human intelligence, from IQ testing and genetic intelligence predictors to the quest for genius.

On December 5, 2019, it was announced that Robert Krulwich would be retiring in January 2020, after fifteen years with the show.

On September 25, 2020, it was announced that Lulu Miller and Latif Nasser would be joining the show as co-hosts alongside Jad Abumrad. In January 2022, it was announced that Abumrad would leave the show and in April 2022, he joined the faculty at Vanderbilt University.

=== Science Friday ===
Science Friday (known as SciFri for short) is a weekly call-in talk show that broadcasts each Friday on over 400 public radio stations and is distributed by WNYC Studios. SciFri is hosted by award-winning science journalist Ira Flatow and was created and is produced by the Science Friday Initiative. The program is divided into two one-hour programs, with each hour ending with a complete sign-off. The focus of each program is news and information on science, nature, medicine, and technology. SciFri is also available as a podcast and is one of the most popular iTunes downloads, frequently in the top 15 downloads each week.

=== Terrestrials ===
Terrestrials, from Radiolab for Kids Presents, launched on September 22, 2022. The six-part podcast series explores the natural world. Radiolab co-host Lulu Miller created and narrates the series, which includes interviews with entomologists, physicists, surfers, hip hop artists and other experts who are in search of new knowledge and ways to interpret natural phenomena.

=== Notes from America with Kai Wright ===
Hosted by Kai Wright, Notes from America debuted as The United States of Anxiety in mid-2016 and featured the voices of voters in Suffolk County, Long Island, NY, the deeply purple region of a blue state where Donald Trump won the GOP primary with 73% of the vote. Following seasons have explored "culture warriors", surge of female candidates in the 2018 mid-term elections, and a post-Reconstruction America. In 2017 Season One of the series was named Best Podcast by the New York Press Club in a special competition focused on coverage of the 2016 presidential campaign. The Atlantic included the series as one of the "Best Podcasts of 2018."

On August 24, 2020, it was announced that The United States of Anxiety would begin airing on WNYC-FM and AM on Sunday evenings.

The show expanded to a nationally syndicated, live call-in radio show on September 25, 2022, and changed its name to Notes from America with Kai Wright. The current show leads discussions that situate current events within historical and cultural contexts.

== Past shows ==
Title	Host(s)	Genre
2 Dope Queens	Jessica Williams and Phoebe Robinson	Comedy
10 Things That Scare Me	None	Monologues
Adulting	Michelle Buteau and Jordan Carlos	Comedy
American Fiasco	Roger Bennett	Sports
Blindspot: Road to 9/11	Jim O'Grady	History
Blindspot: Tulsa Burning	KalaLea	History
Caught: The Lives of Juvenile Justice	Kai Wright	Investigative
Come Through	Rebecca Carroll	Interview talk show
Dear Hank & John	Hank Green and John Green	Commentary
Death, Sex and Money	Anna Sale	Interview talk show
Dolly Parton's America	Jad Abumrad and Shima Oliaee	Biography
Freakonomics Radio	Stephen Dubner and Steven Levitt	Culture and Society
Free Shakespeare on the Radio	Assorted	Radio drama
Here's the Thing	Alec Baldwin	Interview talk show
La Brega	Alana Casanova-Burgess	Society and culture
Nancy	Kathy Tu and Tobin Low	Interview talk show (LGBTQ)
Note to Self	Manoush Zomorodi	Technology
Only Human	Mary Harris	Health
The Realness	Mary Harris and Christopher M. Johnson	Biography
Scattered	Chris Garcia	Biography
The Anthropocene Reviewed	John Green	Commentary
Sooo Many White Guys	Phoebe Robinson	Interview talk show
There Goes the Neighborhood	Kai Wright	Commentary
Trump, Inc.	Andrea Bernstein and Ilya Marritz	Investigative
