= Olaf Everson =

New Zealand cricketer (1912–1995)

Personal information
- Born: 6 February 1912; Auckland, New Zealand
- Died: 27 November 1995 (aged 83); Hamilton, New Zealand

Domestic team information
- Years: Team
- 1943/44: Otago
- Source: CricInfo, 8 May 2016

Olaf Everson (6 February 1912 – 27 November 1995) was a New Zealand cricketer. He played one first-class match for Otago during the 1943–44 season.

Everson was born at Auckland in 1912. His occupation was a "preacher". He died at Hamilton in 1995; an obituary was published in the New Zealand Cricket Almanack the following year.
