= Only Human (podcast) =

American podcast about health and wellness

- Genre: Health Talk Show
- Language: American English

Cast and voices
- Hosted by: Mary Harris

Production
- Production: Leital Molad; Molly Messick; Amanda Aronczyk; Paige Cowett
- Length: ca. 30 min.

Publication
- Original release: October 6, 2015 – May 17, 2017
- Provider: WNYC Studios

Related
- Related shows: Hidden Brain; Sawbones; The Hilarious World of Depression
- Website: www.wnyc.org/shows/onlyhuman/

Only Human is a health-oriented podcast produced by WNYC Studios. The podcast is hosted by Mary Harris, who previously covered health for ABC News.

== Background ==
WNYC chose Mary Harris as the host of the show because they were hoping to expand the demographic of their audience to include young women. The show was hosted on Mondays at 9:30pm eastern standard time. The show was an attempt to create a health-oriented discussion that was more accessible to listeners. The show discusses topics such as laughter's effect on health, cancer, water pollution, transgender hormone therapy, and transgender health disparities. The show did a series on the ability to listen. The show also discusses how some doctors struggle with addiction the same as their patients.

== Reception ==
Esquire listed the show as one of the best podcasts in 2016. Women's Health listed the show as one of the best health and wellness podcasts.
