= Donja R. Love =

American playwright

- Born: Philadelphia, Pennsylvania, U.S.
- Occupation: Playwright, Film Maker
- Education: Temple University (African American Studies and Theater, undergraduate incomplete), Juilliard (Playwriting, Artist Diploma)
- Notable awards: 2018 Laurents/Hatcher Foundation Award, 2017 Princess Grace Playwriting Award, Lark's 2016 Van Lier New Voices Playwriting Fellow, Playwrights Realm’s 2016/2017 Writing Fellow

Donja R. Love is an American playwright. Originally from Philadelphia, Pennsylvania, Love identifies himself as an Afro-Queer, HIV positive playwright and filmmaker. His work has been produced in multiple states around the United States, but he is mainly based in New York City and Philadelphia. He is best known for his 2019 play one in two based on the 2017 CDC study that found that one in two black gay or bisexual men will be diagnosed with HIV at some point in their life.

== Early life ==
Donja R. Love grew up in Philadelphia, Pennsylvania, and later graduated from high school there. He then attended Temple University, majoring in African American Studies and Theater but did not complete his degree. In 2008, Love was diagnosed with HIV after going to the doctor for a cough. Struggling with his condition, Love recalls turning to sex and drinking for comfort before finding recovery through the Christian church and playwriting. His mother, who lives in Philadelphia, taught him that life would be difficult due to his identity. Love began writing, producing, and directing his own plays in the Philadelphia area.

After establishing himself in Pennsylvania, Love moved to New York City to pursue his career as a playwright. While in New York, he completed several playwriting fellowships to further his craft before being accepted to Juilliard for playwriting for the 2018–2019 term.

== Career ==
Love began playwriting in the late 2000s. His most well-known piece, One in Two was written around the tenth anniversary of his HIV diagnosis. He wrote this play using the notes app on his phone from his bed to therapeutically process his emotions. Initially, it was not intended for production, but it has become his most well-known work produced Off-Broadway.

In the past few years, Donja R. Love has begun working in film and television. His most notable works include Modern Day Black Gay, a web series, and Once a Star, a short film.

In 2020, Love began a writing workshop specifically for writers with HIV named Write It Out! This project is partially inspired by Love's experience, having turned to writing as his career after his diagnosis. One in two established Love as a leader in the HIV-positive realm of theatre, especially for narratives involving queer people of color. The National Queer Theater is putting on the writing-intensive Write It Out!. Broadway Cares/Equity Fights AIDS is in collaboration with this project.

== Philosophy ==
Love is particularly interested in sharing the stories of marginalized people. As a black, queer, HIV-positive playwright, he often writes from his own experience in order to pursue this goal. Starting out as a performer, writing was not Love's original position in the theatre. Yet, through his writing, Love has presented more specific narratives of HIV-positive people in a way not seen in theater before. He draws his inspiration from influential writers such as Toni Morrison and James Baldwin, two highly influential Black writers.

He writes plays that tell the stories of Black Queer Folx for the audiences made of Black Queer Folx. His work focuses on normalizing these marginalized identities and bringing joy as well as depth to the typical monolithic portrayal of LGBTQ+ people of color. Through his productions, he emphasizes collaboration with directors and actors of color who help highlight these stories.

== List of plays ==
Following is a list of plays by Donja R. Love

- Sugar in Our Wounds
- Fireflies
- In the Middle
- One in Two
- The Trade
- Soft
- The North Star
- A Ugandan Family
- The Review

== Accolades ==
Love has received extensive media coverage for his work as an activist and playwright with profiles in TheBody.com, American Theatre Magazine, them, The Philadelphia Inquirer, TDF Stages, BroadwayWorld, and Playbill.

Love has received numerous awards for his work including leading POZ Magazine's POZ 100 List for 2021, the 2021 Terrence McNally Award for What Will Happen to All That Beauty?, POZ Magazine's 2020 Best New Play Award for one in two, the 2018 Laurents/Hatcher Foundation Award for Sugar in Our Wounds, the 2017 Princess Grace Award Playwrighting Fellowship, the 2016 Lark Theatre's Van Lier New Voices Playwrighting Fellowship, and the 2016/2017 Playwrights Realm's Writing Fellowship.
