= TED Radio Hour =

US radio program

- Home station: National Public Radio
- Hosted by: Alison Stewart (2012); Guy Raz (2013–2019); Manoush Zomorodi (2020–present)
- Original release: April 27, 2012
- Website: www.npr.org/programs/ted-radio-hour

TED Radio Hour is a weekly, hour-long radio program and podcast, produced as a co-production between TED (conference) and National Public Radio. It is broadcast on 600+ public radio stations in the United States and internationally, and is also available as a free weekly podcast. The first episode aired on April 27, 2012, with host Alison Stewart. Beginning with Season 2, the series was hosted by Guy Raz. In November 2019, Manoush Zomorodi was named the show’s new host.

Each episode of the TED Radio Hour is one hour long, and explores a theme — such as happiness, crowd-sourcing innovation or power shifts — through three to four related TED Talks. The talks (all of which have been previously recorded and released by TED) are supplemented by follow-up interviews with the speaker, original reporting and other segments that bring the ideas to life.

Each TED Radio Hour episode is elaborately stylized, layering original sound design under each TED Talk and conversation.

== History ==
The idea of a TED radio show was first proposed in 2011 by TED's head of content distribution Deron Triff to NPR Interim President and CEO Joyce Slocum. When the series premiered in April 2012, it was carried by 76 of NPR's member stations, including WHYY Philadelphia, KUOW Seattle and KOPB Portland. By the end of Season 1, it was carried by 250+ member stations including WNYC. By the premiere of Season 2, it was carried by 300+ member stations. TED Radio Hour now airs on 600+ radio stations across the U.S. and internationally.

Between Season 1 and Season 2, the show's team, led by NPR's VP of Programming Eric Nuzum, Deron Triff and Series Producer Jeff Rogers, overhauled the show. It expanded to a weekly schedule, and the format was revised, to emphasize stylized sound design. Guy Raz, formerly of Weekend All Things Considered, was selected as the new host. In November 2019, Manoush Zomorodi, previously host of the WNYC podcast Note to Self, was named the show’s new host.

== Credits ==
According to the show credits, in Season 1, TED Radio Hour was produced by Jeff Rogers, Sam Greenspan and Meghan Keane with help from NPR's Eric Nuzum, and TED's Chris Anderson, June Cohen, Deron Triff, Emily McManus and Janet Lee. In Season 2, TED Radio Hour was produced by Jeff Rogers, Brent Baughman, Meghan Keane, Neva Grant and Sanaz Meshkinpour with help from NPR's Portia Robertson Migas and Eric Nuzum, and TED's Chris Anderson, June Cohen, Deron Triff and Janet Lee.

== Reception and awards ==
TED Radio Hour is carried by 600+ public radio stations. As of January 2024, TED Radio Hour has earned 4 wins and 2 nominations, which includes:

=== The Webby Awards ===
- 2018 Winner for Best Science and Education Podcasts (General Series).

=== The Ambies ===
- 2023 Winner for Best Knowledge, Science or Tech Podcast.
- 2022 Nominee for Best Knowledge, Science or Tech Podcast.

=== People's Choice Podcast Awards ===
- 2018 People's Voice Award Winner for Best Science and Education Podcast.
- 2010 People's Choice Podcast Award Winner for Best Video Podcast.

=== iHeartRadio Podcast Awards ===
- 2021 Nominee for Best Technology Podcast.

TED Radio Hour was also named "Best New Audio Podcast of 2012" by iTunes.
