= Here's the Thing =

Podcast by Alec Baldwin

- Language: English

Cast and voices
- Hosted by: Alec Baldwin

Publication
- Provider: iHeartMedia

Here's the Thing is a public radio show and podcast hosted by actor Alec Baldwin. On October 24, 2011, New York City's WNYC released the first episode of Baldwin's podcast, a series of interviews with public figures including artists, policy makers and performers. Here's the Thing was developed for Baldwin by Lu Olkowski, Trey Kay, Kathy Russo and Emily Botein. Baldwin stated that the show's title derived from a phrase that Saturday Night Live producer Lorne Michaels speaks "30 times a day."

In 2013, The Hollywood Reporter reported that the show was to end after two seasons. However, it has continued. Between 2011 and 2020, Baldwin completed more than 150 interviews. A TV version is in development for ABC; a preview episode of Sundays with Alec Baldwin premiered in March 2018.

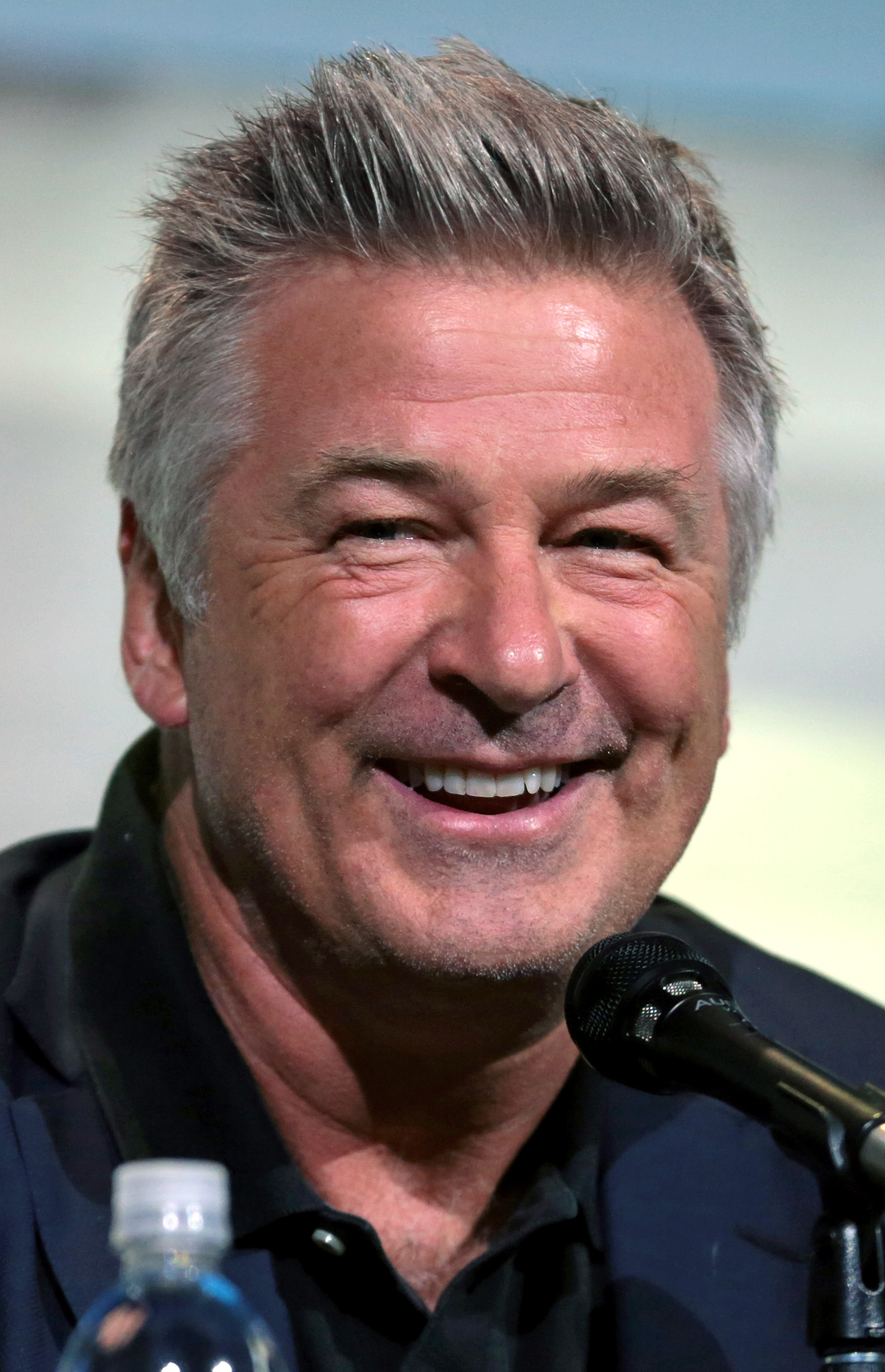
Alec Baldwin
