= Saheem Ali =

Kenyan theatre director

- Born: Nairobi, Kenya
- Education: Northeastern University (BA); Columbia University (MFA)
- Occupation: Associate Artistic Director at The Public Theater
- Years active: 2003-present
- Website: https://www.saheemali.com/

Saheem Ali is a Kenyan theatre director. He is Associate Artistic Director at The Public Theater in New York City. He is most known for directing culturally specific works like Buena Vista Social Club and Fat Ham. Saheem's work has been graced the stages of Broadway, London, Los Angeles, and New York's Off-Broadway landscape.

== Early life and education ==
Ali was born in Nairobi, Kenya. He earned his undergraduate degree from Northeastern University and he holds an MFA in Directing from Columbia University.

Ali was first introduced to theatre when he saw a production of Grease in London at age fifteen and returned to Nairobi to stage a version of it with high school students there.

== Early career ==
Ali assisted on productions in Minneapolis at Theatre de la Jeune Lune and Wintertime at the Guthrie Theater in 2003. Ali was assistant director on several productions in Boston, including Commonwealth Shakespeare Company (CSC) Shakespeare's Henry Vin 2002 and Macbeth in 2003. He assisted on the operas Powder Her Face in 2003 and Angels in America in 2006 for Opera Boston. He also assisted on The Miser for American Repertory Theater (A.R.T.) in 2004.

In 2009, he was assistant director for Giant and in 2010 for Angels in America, both at Signature Theatre Company. In 2010 he assisted on A Free Man of Color at Lincoln Center Theater and in 2011 for The Normal Heart on Broadway.

== The Public / Shakespeare in the Park ==
In 2014, Ali conducted a workshop on Dominique Morisseau’s Facing Our Truths. In 2015, Ali was Associate Director under Michael Greif for The Tempest. In 2017, he conducted a reading of The Unbearable Whiteness of Being, the Jeremy Kamps play, and he directed Twelfth Night for The Mobile Unit and set the action in coastal Florida with Viola and Sebastian as Cuban refugees.

Ali was slated to direct Richard II for Shakespeare in the Park in the summer of 2020, but with the Covid-19 pandemic, he re-envisioned the production as a serialized radio play, co-produced by The Public Theater and WNYC-FM radio. It starred André Holland in the lead and had a cast of predominantly actors of color including Lupita Nyong'o, John Douglas Thompson, and Phylicia Rashad. He followed with two more radio plays, including Anne Washburn’s Shipwreck and the 2021 bilingual Romeo y Julieta starring Lupita Nyong'o.

The National Endowment for the Arts describes Ali's signature as "his ongoing work with plays that contemporize and expand Shakespeare". In summer 2021, he directed Merry Wives, an adaptation of The Merry Wives of Windsor by Jocelyn Bioh for The Public. In 2022, he directed Fat Ham, a new play by James Ijames, that received the Pulitzer Prize for Drama. Ali had previously worked with Ijames when he workshopped Kill Move Paradise at National Black Theatre in 2016 and directed it in 2017.

== Other directing ==
Ali has directed a variety of plays, from Marisol by José Rivera at Barnard College in 2011 to A Lesson from Aloes by Athol Fugard at Juilliard School in 2016. In 2016, he directed Dot by Colman Domingo at Detroit Public Theatre and Hair: The American Tribal Love-Rock Musical at Pace University.

He directed Nollywood Dreams by Jocelyn Bioh at Cherry Lane Theater in 2017 and at MCC Theater in 2021. In 2018, he directed Tartuffe at PlayMakers Repertory Company, and in 2019 he directed The Rolling Stone at Lincoln Center Theater. In 2019, he directed Anna Deavere Smith's Fires in the Mirror at Signature Theatre Company and Anne Washburn's Shipwreck at Woolly Mammoth Theatre Company.

== Arts development and service ==
Ali is known for actively participating in the development process of new plays. He has had workshops or readings of several plays that he later directed.

He workshopped Donja R. Love's Fireflies at Rising Circle Collective and New Dramatists in 2017 and 2018, respectively, and directed it at Atlantic Theater Company in 2018. He workshopped Donja R. Love's Sugar in Our Wounds at Playwrights Realm in 2017 and directed a production of it at Manhattan Theatre Club (MTC) in 2018. In 2017, he workshopped Chris Chen's Passage at Long Wharf Theatre and directed it at Soho Repertory Theatre in 2019 and conducted a workshop of The Dangerous House of Pretty Mbane by Jen Silverman in 2018 and directed it (as Dangerous House) in 2018.

Ali has also partnered in the playwriting process. He directed The Booty Call, a play he co-wrote with Michael Thurber at Inner Voices in 2016 and workshopped it the following year at Roundabout Underground. Ali worked with Michael Thurber and Mkhululi Mabija on Goddess for the O’Neill Musical Theater Conference in 2013, and the play developed to be co-written by Thurber and Jocelyn Bioh at Theater Latte Da in 2017, with Ali directing it at Berkeley Repertory Theatre in 2022.

== Awards ==
- 2025: Tony Award, Best Direction of a Musical for Buena Vista Social Club (nominated)
- 2025: Drama League Award, Outstanding Direction of a Play for Good Bones (nominated)
- 2025: Drama League Award, Outstanding Direction of a Musical for Buena Vista Social Club (nominated)
- 2024: Drama League Award, Outstanding Direction of a Musical for Buena Vista Social Club (nominated)
- 2023: Tony Award, Best Direction of a Play for Fat Ham (nominated)
- 2022: Drama Desk Award, Outstanding Director of a Play for Merry Wives (nominated)
- 2022: Drama League Award, Outstanding Direction of a Play for Merry Wives (nominated)
- 2022 Obie Award, Sustained Achievement in Directing
- 2022 Obie Award, Special Citation
- 2020: National Critics Institute Fellow
- 2013: Sir John Gielgud Fellowship / SDCF
- Emerging Artist Fellowship / New York Theatre Workshop
- Shubert Fellowship, Columbia University
- Presidential Scholarship in Theatre / Northeastern University
