= Unfinished: Deep South =

True crime podcast

- Genre: Investigative journalism; Investigative history
- Language: English

Cast and voices
- Hosted by: Taylor Hom and Neil Shea

Production
- Production: Lynn Nottage; Tony Gerber; Peter Clowney; Chris Bannon

Technical specifications
- Audio format: Podcast (via streaming or downloadable MP3)

Publication
- No. of seasons: 1
- No. of episodes: 10
- Original release: June 3 – August 31, 2020
- Provider: Witness Docs for Stitcher Radio
- Updates: Weekly

Related
- Website: www.witnesspodcasts.com/shows/unfinished-deep-south

Unfinished: Deep South is a podcast that investigates the unsolved murder of Isadore Banks, one of the wealthiest African-Americans on the Arkansas Delta. The 10-episode podcast was released in June 2020 by Market Road Films and Stitcher Radio. In 2021 it was nominated for a Peabody Award.

Banks was murdered in 1954, just three weeks after the Supreme Court ruling that overturned segregation. Creators of the podcast, journalist Neil Shea and documentary filmmaker Taylor Hom normally cover international stories but decided to focus on the U.S. for their next project. Hom became aware of Isadore Banks after reading about the U.S. Justice Department's Cold Case Initiative of 2006. This was a joint effort between the Civil Rights Division, United States Attorneys' Offices and the FBI to focus their resources on the investigations of more than 100 pending pre-1979 murders. After some initial interviews with members of the Banks family, Shea and Hom decided the story of Isadore Banks was more than just an unsolved murder.

== Season 1 (2020) ==
#	Title	Length (minutes:seconds)	Release date
1	"Isadore Banks"	38:26	June 3, 2020
A racist system perpetually murdering African Americans and covering up the murders dates back 400-years to the slave trade. Unfinished: Deep South podcast begins by trying to uncover the murder of Isadore Banks, a 59-year-old prominent black business man and landowner living in Marion, Arkansas who was found tied to a tree after being lynched on June 8, 1954. Multiple townsfolk recount his life, his stories, and facts about the aftermath of his disappearance and death.
2	"The High Sheriff"	40:12	June 29, 2020
Successful business men like Isadore Banks were monitored under the watchful eye of the Sheriff whose role was that of an enforcer of white supremacy. The social norms and traditions of small southern towns come under scrutiny against the backdrop of the Jim Crow era.
3	"Family Ties"	38:25	June 13, 2020
Taylor and Neil investigate the details of Isadore Banks' life through interviews that recount the violent encounters leading up to his death. Relatives sprawled throughout the country piece together the Banks' family lineage and provide a racialized historical context of Arkansas. Nancy Banks, Isadore's grandmother, began what Isadore would later build into his wealth by buying land in Georgia in the name of her kids. The Banks family migrated to Arkansas, the state most migrated to between the end of the Civil War and 1920. Isadore's fortune constantly ebbed and flowed in the decades after their arrival.
4	"White Memories"	31:35	July 20, 2020
After summarizing the historical context and the year leading up to Isadore Banks' death, Taylor and Neil focus on the day of his disappearance and the day of his discovery. Many white people refused to speak, and it seemed like the town was hiding a secret. After vigorously searching for any person with information, they interview Rosalyn, a woman who claims she knows the identity of Isadore's murderer, but will not say who it is for fear of civil litigation.
5	"A Very American Crime"	30:47	July 27, 2020
After multiple interviewees contest whether to define Isadore's death as a lynching or a murder, Taylor and Neil try to define a lynching and explore its history. Although lynching is historically close to us and references to it appear in today's society, white people still denounce lynchings as cases of the past. Lynchings have many forms and are not simply defined by nooses and ropes. Interviews and historical references help explain why the town of Marion has difficulty labeling Isadore's death.
6	"The Housepainter"	31:30	August 3, 2020
Taylor and Neil learn the name of a man in town who drunkenly confessed to the murder of Isadore Banks. As they investigate, they learn that he may have been involved in a second lynching 9 years later. They begin to investigate this second murder, in hopes of discovering information that might help link the man to Isadore's death.
7	"The Stepdaughter"	26:49	August 10, 2020
Taylor and Neil travel to Tennessee to talk to the stepdaughter of one of their suspects. They seek information about her attack years after Isadore's death and the lynching that occurred as a result. They discuss Isadore, the second lynching, and her stepfather with the woman.
8	"Who Lynched Isadore Banks?	31:12	August 17, 2020
The case goes cold which requires Taylor and Neil to take a drastic measure in order to find leads. Will their idea work?
9	"The Meeting	31:52	August 24, 2020
People from the past emerge but contradicting stories abound. Will there finally be a break in the case?
10	"The Things We Haven't Seen	32:49	August 31, 2020
A memorial and a sense of closure. Based on current events, the question of whether anything has changed haunts some family members.

=== People involved ===
Isadore Banks

- Grandparents: Elias Banks, a white land-owner living in Rome Georgia, and an African American woman named Nancy Banks, who was formerly enslaved. They had a son, named John who was Isadore's father. Elias Banks died in 1878.
- Parents: John Banks and Annie Butler. Annie was African American and believed to be part Native American (Cherokee). Isadore was born to John and Annie in Georgia in 1895, he was the third of seven children. Isadore's mother died at a young age.

Banks Family

- Around 1917 Isadore married Alice Biggs. He is 23 and a self-employed farmer. After serving in WWI, he returned home in 1919.
- Muriel Banks: oldest daughter of Isadore and his wife Alice Banks.
- Dorothy Williams: daughter of Isadore Banks. Her mother was a sharecropper and one of Isadore's mistresses. She and her mother lived on land Isadore rented from the Italian widow.
- Marcelina "Lina" Williams: daughter of Dorothy, granddaughter of Isadore.
- Jim Banks: son of Isadore and Willie Lee Banks. It is unclear if Isadore was married legally to Willie.
- Norman Banks: Isadore's brother and business partner.

Anderson Family

- Andrew Lee Anderson: The oldest of 12 children whose family lived outside of Marion. Andrew made money by mowing lawns and doing odd jobs in Marion. While in Marion on a job, Andrew was believed to have attacked a young girl. He was hunted down by a posse, shot multiple times and died. He was 16 at the time. No investigation was pursued.
- Roy Anderson: Andrew's father
- Geraldine and Earline: Andrew's sisters

Townspeople

- Willie and Ida Gammon: Cousins and locals of Marion heard at the beginning of the podcast to take the creators on a tour of Isadore's, now abandoned, Cotton Gin.
- Cecil Goodwin: Sheriff of Crittenden County
- Maggie Sue Goodwin: Wife of Sheriff Goodwin
- James Wilburn, Sr: Business man and close friend of Isadore's who lived down the street. He ran several businesses including the Black Cat Hotel frequented by musicians who performed on the Chitlin Circuit.
- James Wilburn, Jr. Son of James Sr. Recounts how his father's businesses and homes were terrorized and burned down.
- Flora Belle Wilburn: Daughter of James, Sr and younger sister of James, Jr.
- Elijah Maxwell: Neighbor of the Wilburn family.
- Mr. Fleming: Neighbor of the Wilburn family.
- Ben McGee: Former Arkansas State Representative.
- Tommy Gamon: Son of a family that was being threatened by Night Riders. Isadore taught him how to shoot in case the threat was followed through.
- Professor Story Matkin-Rawn: Teaches history at the University of Central Arkansas.
- Ginny Marts: Grew up in Marion and describes the different versions of stories she had heard about Isadore Banks murder.
- Roselyn O'Neill: A local woman thought of as the "town historian".
- Sam Burns: A painter who is somehow linked to Isadore's murder.
- "Julie" : Stepdaughter of Sam Burns and wife of "Mike". Julie holds a key to what happened to Andrew Anderson.
- Vera Baretti Simonetta: She recounts her father's reaction to Isadore's death.
- Annie Will Johnson: Daughter of a family Isadore was friendly with, He gave her a ride home from the bus stop and visited with her family. That was the last time anyone saw Isadore.

Other Individuals

- Margaret Burnham: Law professor at Northeastern University in Boston. Oversees The Civil Rights and Restorative Justice Project.
- Toby Moore: Asst. Professor of Geography at the University of Iowa. Wrote the article Race and the County Sheriff in the American South.
- Carmen White: Member of the BlackProGen, a group specializing in tracing African American history.
- Ashraf Rashdi: Professor of African-American studies at Wesleyan University provides a history of lynching.
- Rachel Walton: Professor of Criminal Justice at Utah State.
- Shabaka Afri'ka: President of the Crittenden County, Arkansas NAACP
- Rev. Edward Hampton: He was 19 when Isadore was killed and recounts his memory of the event.
- Jay Driscoll: Historian who discovered the Vernon McDaniel report on Isadore Banks
- Vernon McDaniel: A field agent for the NAACP and author of the Isadore Banks Case of Desegregation in Crittenden County Ark, December 6, 1954.
- Thurgood Marshall: during the time of Isadore's death he was the executive director of the NAACP Legal Defense and Educational Fund and most likely reviewed Vernon McDaniel's report.
- Bryan Stevenson: Attorney, social justice activist and founder of the Equal Justice Initiative

Historical Moments

- Reconstruction
- Age of Lynching, after WWI
- Red Summer
- Great Migration (African American).
- Jim Crow Era
- World War I, military history of African Americans
- The Great Depression
- George Floyd, his death is viewed as another example of the history of police brutality and sparked the phrase "Remember George Floyd".

== Release and Reception ==
Unfinished: Deep South was released on June 9, 2020, two weeks after the murder of George Floyd in Minneapolis, Minnesota, and was noted as relevant by the media. Saidiya Hartman, the author of Wayward Lives, Beautiful Experiments called the podcast a "a tremendously smart and compelling series that investigates the lynching of Isadore Banks, a wealthy black farmer in Arkansas." She described the podcast as "timely" and "required listening." Reverend Jesse Jackson said of the podcast, "Truth crushed to earth will rise again. We are in a deep season of terror and darkness. White supremacy and the distorted belief in Black inferiority was once a formula for getting along. Now, we have changed our minds for ourselves and for our destiny. We began marching, protesting. We have the power to change the whole world. Unfinished: Deep South podcast is a timely reminder of how the dark past still has repercussions today."

In 2021, the podcast was nominated for a Peabody Award. It was also ranked as the #35 Best Podcast of 2020 by The Atlantic, and it was cited as #23 in the PopSugar article, "These 25 True-Crime Podcasts From 2020 Will Have You Constantly Looking Behind You"

Several news agencies published articles about the podcast including New York Public Radio, "Investigating a 1954 Lynching," Playbill, "Unfinished: Deep South, New Podcast From Lynn Nottage and More About Lynching of Isadore Banks, Premieres June 29," The Financial Times, "Unfinished: Deep South is a shocking podcast about an unsolved murder," The Arkansas Democrat Gazette, "Podcasting: A legacy vanished," and The St. Louis American, "'A Very American Crime' Podcast series features Arkansas lynching tragedy with St. Louis connection."

== Credits ==
A production of Market Road Films and Stitcher Radio

Created and reported by Taylor Hom and Neil Shea

Editors: Peter Clowney, Gianna Palmer, and Tracey Samuelson

Executive Producers: Lynn Nottage, Tony Gerber, Peter Clowney, and Chris Bannon

Senior Producers: Laura Colleluori and Stephanie Kariuki

Producing & Editing by: Lisa John Rogers and Joy Okon Sunday

Mixing Engineer: Casey Holford

Music: Hubby Jenkins

Original Theme Music and Scoring: Casey Holford, with Ryan Thornton and Dan Costello

Additional Research: Lisa John Rogers, Jay W. Driskell, Carmen White, Kriska Desir, and Babette Thomas

Fact Checkers: Soraya Shockley and Michelle Harris

Interns: Brooke LaMantia and Lukas Noguchi and Shahruz Ghaemi.
