= WNYC =

New York Public Radio audio service brand

- WNYC
- Named after: WNYC (AM)
- Location: New York City, United States
- Region served: New York metropolitan area
- Services: Audio programmimg (radio and podcast)
- Parent organization: New York Public Radio
- Website: www.wnyc.org

WNYC is one of the service brands under the oversight of New York Public Radio, a non-profit organization. Radio and other audio programming is primarily provided by a pair of nonprofit, noncommercial, public radio stations: WNYC (AM) and WNYC-FM, located in New York City. Both stations are members of NPR and carry local and national news/talk programs.

WNYC reaches more than one million listeners each week and has the largest public radio audience in the United States. The WNYC stations are co-owned with Newark, New Jersey-licensed classical music outlet WQXR-FM (105.9 MHz), and all three broadcast from studios located in the Hudson Square neighborhood in lower Manhattan.

WNYC has been an early adopter of new technologies including HD radio, live audio streaming, and podcasting. RSS feeds and email newsletters link to archived audio of individual program segments. WNYC also makes some of its programming available on SiriusXM satellite radio.

== Programming ==
The WNYC brand produces a mixture of podcasts and radio programs. Some programming is simulcast by WNYC (AM) and WNYC-FM, and at other times different programming airs on each station.

WNYC produces and broadcasts programming for a local audience, including news and interview shows The Brian Lehrer Show and All of It with Alison Stewart, along with a roster of nationally syndicated WNYC Studios produced including Radiolab, On the Media, and The New Yorker Radio Hour. WNYC is a leading member station of NPR, broadcasting NPR's major daily news programs including Morning Edition and All Things Considered. WNYC also broadcasts programs from the BBC World Service and selected programs from other producers including This American Life, Wait Wait... Don't Tell Me!, and Fresh Air. The broadcasts airs on WNYC 93.9 FM and AM 820 in New York City, and also streams live over the internet. As a result, the station reaches listeners from across the country and around the globe. WNYC-AM-FM has a local news team of approximately 60 journalists, producers, editors, and other broadcasting professionals.

WNYC and WNYC Studios programs and podcasts include:

- The Brian Lehrer Show is a two-hour weekday talk show covering local and national current events and social issues hosted by Brian Lehrer, a former anchor and reporter for NBC Radio Network. It won a Peabody Award in 2007 "for facilitating reasoned conversation about critical issues and opening it up to everyone within earshot." In 2014, the show won first place in the Garden State Journalists Association Awards.
- All of It with Alison Stewart covers culture in the broadest sense – religion, food, language, music etc. In October 2019 the show launched the monthly book club Get Lit with All of It. In April 2020, as New York City neared the peak of the COVID-19 pandemic, the show partnered with the New York Public Library to shift the book club to a virtual monthly event.
- On the Media is a nationally syndicated, weekly one-hour program hosted by Brooke Gladstone covering the media and its effect on American culture and society. Stories also regularly cover such topics as video news releases, net neutrality, media consolidation, censorship, freedom of the press, spin, and how the media is changing with technology. It won a Peabody Award in 2004 for providing listeners "an insightful journey into the inner workings and outer effects of the media.". In 2013, then co-host Brooke Gladstone won a Gracie Award for Outstanding Host. The episode "Bench Press", which looked at the Supreme Court and its relationship with the media, won both a New York Press Club Award and the American Bar Association's Silver Gavel Award in 2016. Bob Garfield co-hosted the program until 2021, when he was fired from WNYC for violating its anti-bullying policies.
- New Sounds – Since 1982, founder and host John Schaefer has devoted the program to present new and eclectic music. The New York Times hailed the program as "a genre-defying radio program that has played an outsize role in [New York City's] new music scene for nearly four decades." In early 2018, the 24-hour streaming music site NewSounds.org was launched.
- Radio Rookies – provides teenagers with the tools and training to create radio stories about themselves, their communities and their world. The show won a Peabody Award in 2005 for "teaching teens the fundamentals of radio reporting and giving listeners unvarnished insights into worlds ignored and disregarded," with the awarding body calling the show "ingenious." In 2017 the story "Gentrification: Feeling Like an Outsider in Your Own Neighborhood" won a National Edward R. Murrow Award. One of the stories from a rookie reporter, "Trying to Graduate from High School at 21", won both a Regional and National Edward R. Murrow Award in 2019.
- Trump, Inc., hosted by Peabody Award-winning journalist Andrea Bernstein and Ilya Marritz, is a joint reporting project with ProPublica about President Donald Trump, his family, and the Trump administration's potential conflicts of interest. In 2018 the show was awarded an Alfred I. duPont-Columbia University Award, the medallion for Radio Features News in the Excellence in Journalism Award Competition conducted by The Society of the Silurians, and Apple named it as one of the most popular podcasts launched that year.
- Fishko Files – Sara Fishko produces sound-rich essays on art, culture, music and media. The feature "Realism and Rebellion" won a Regional Edward R. Murrow Award in 2019.
- The Takeaway – a weekday one-hour news show, hosted by Melissa Harris-Perry, co-produced with Public Radio Exchange.
- Death, Sex & Money – Host Anna Sale talks to celebrities and regular people about relationships, money, family, work and making it all count.
- Radiolab – two-time Peabody Award-winning podcast attempts to approach broad, difficult topics such as "time" and "morality" in an accessible and light-hearted manner and with a distinctive audio production style. Hosted by Jad Abumrad, Lulu Miller, and Latif Nasser.
- Free Shakespeare on the Radio was a co-production between WNYC Studios and The Public Theater that reimagined the Theater's annual "Free Shakespeare in the Park" as a multi-episode radio play. The production was conceived after the COVID-19 pandemic prevented the annual outdoor play from taking place, the first time in nearly 60 years. The originally scheduled performance of Richard II was adapted for radio and directed by Saheem Ali. The performance was dedicated to the Black Lives Matter movement and featured a cast composed predominantly of BIPOC actors, including André Holland, Phylicia Rashad, and Lupita Nyong'o. The New York Times said the cast "delivered electric performances, spotlighting the aural delights of Shakespeare's language."

== History ==
=== Early years ===
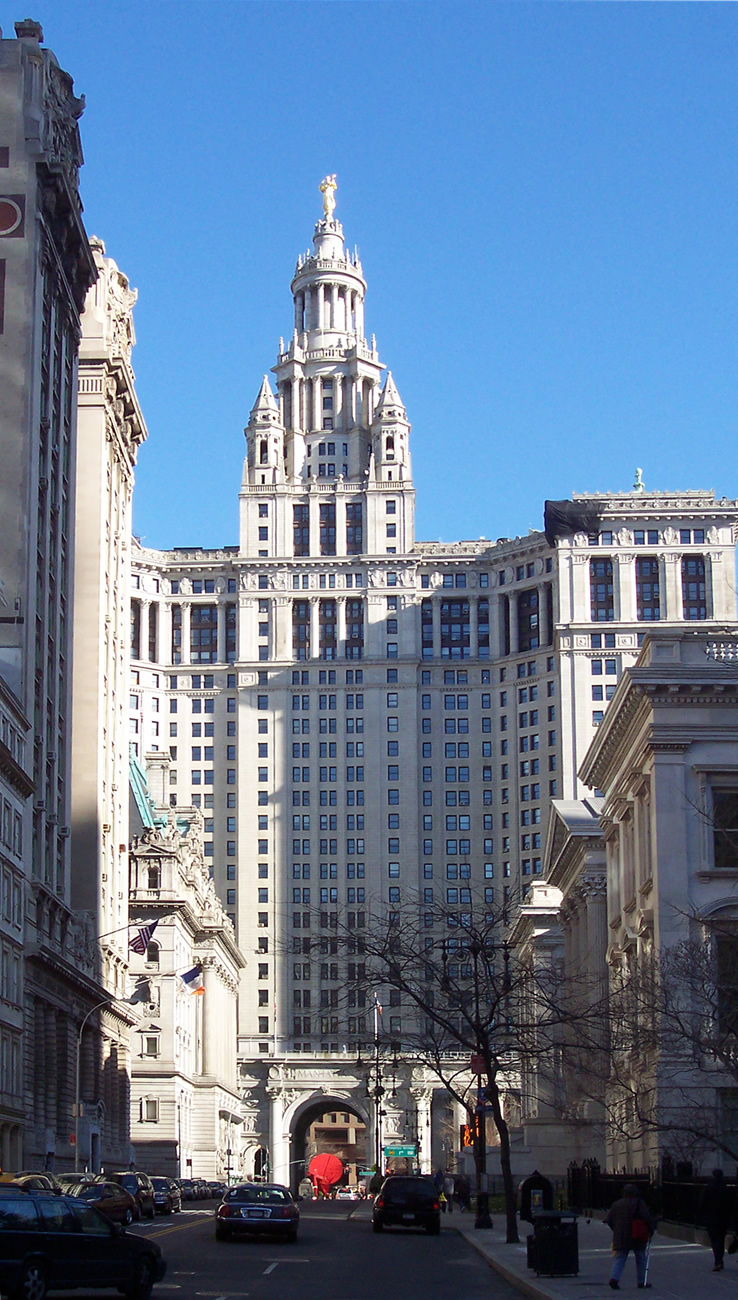
Manhattan Municipal Building, WNYC's home from 1924 to 2008

WNYC (AM) began broadcasting in 1924 and is one of the oldest radio stations in the city. WNYC-FM began broadcasting in 1943. Both stations were originally owned by the City of New York.

=== Independence from the City ===
Shortly after assuming the mayoralty in 1994, Rudy Giuliani announced he was considering selling the WNYC stations. Giuliani believed that broadcasting was no longer essential as a municipal service, and that the financial compensation from selling the stations could be used to help the City cover budget shortfalls. The final decision was made in March 1995: while the City opted to divest WNYC-TV (now WPXN-TV) through a blind auction to commercial buyers, WNYC-AM-FM was sold to the WNYC Foundation for $20 million over a six-year period, far less than what the stations could have been sold for if they were placed on the open market. While the sale put an end to the occasional political intrusions of the past, it required the WNYC Foundation to embark on a major appeal towards listeners, other foundations, and private benefactors. The station's audience and budget have continued to grow since the split from the city.

=== Move to new studios ===
On June 16, 2008, WNYC moved from its 51,400 square feet (4,780 m^{2}) of rent-free space scattered on eight floors of the Manhattan Municipal Building to a new location at 160 Varick Street, near the Holland Tunnel. The station now occupies 3 1/2 floors of a 12-story former printing building in Hudson Square.

The new offices have 12-foot (4 m) ceilings and 71,900 square feet (6,680 m^{2}) of space. The number of recording studios and booths has doubled, to 31. There is a new 140-seat, street-level studio for live broadcasts, concerts and public forums and an expansion of the newsroom of over 60 journalists.

Renovation, construction, rent and operating costs for the new Varick Street location amounted to $45 million. In addition to raising these funds, WNYC raised money for a one-time fund of $12.5 million to cover the cost of creating 40 more hours of new programming and three new shows. The total cost of $57.5 million for both the move and programming is nearly three times the $20 million the station had to raise over seven years to buy its licenses from the City in 1997.

== See also ==
- WPXN-TV (channel 31, formerly WNYC-TV)
- WNYC Studios
- Media in New York City
