= The New Yorker Radio Hour =

Interview podcast and radio show

- Genre: Magazine
- Running time: 55 min. (approx.)
- Country of origin: United States
- Language: English
- Home station: WNYC Studios
- Syndicates: WNYC
- Hosted by: David Remnick
- Created by: The New Yorker; WNYC Studios
- Written by: Various
- Produced by: Ave Carrillo; Steven Valentino; Rhiannon Corby; Alex Barron; Kalalea; Ngofeen Mputubwele
- Executive producer: David Krasnow
- Recording studio: New York City
- Original release: 2015
- Audio format: Stereo
- Opening theme: Composed by Merrill Garbus
- Website: newyorkerradio.com
- Podcast: RSS feed

The New Yorker Radio Hour is a radio show and podcast produced by The New Yorker and WNYC Studios. It is hosted by David Remnick, who has been editor of The New Yorker since 1998. The first episode of The New Yorker Radio Hour debuted on October 24, 2015. The New Yorker Radio Hour is broadcast on more than 345 terrestrial radio stations, is also available on demand in a variety of ways.

The weekly radio show and podcast features interviews with journalists and cartoonists from The New Yorker as well as interviews with artists, writers, comedians, filmmakers and other cultural figures. Past guests include Aziz Ansari, Sarah Koenig, Julián Castro, Larry David, Ta-Nehisi Coates, Gloria Steinem, and Amy Schumer.

== Format ==
As defined by host David Remnick, The New Yorker Radio Hour is "an hourlong program that is very much of The New Yorker, infused by its values, hosted by its writers and editors and artists, but also something unique, capacious, freewheeling". However, the podcast does not include New Yorker pieces read out loud and is not a reproduction of the magazine. Furthermore, according to Remnick, the depth of the interviews, variety, and daring of the interviews as well as the humor sets the podcast apart from the magazine.

While the podcast includes stories connected to the news, it is not a news program, but rather a show focused on interviews and personal narratives. It also features readings of short fiction, book excerpts and satirical or humorous monologues.

== History ==
Before creating The New Yorker Radio Hour, the magazine had several podcasts dedicated to a variety of topics including politics, culture, and fiction. The New Yorker Radio Hour is different in that it is distributed to public-radio stations around the country and is co-produced with WNYC Studios. On October 24, 2015, the show debuted on 26 stations around the United States.

The New Yorker Radio Hour began as a podcast on October 23, 2015. The first episode featured a conversation between host David Remnick and author Ta-Nehisi Coates; a personal story from The New Yorker staff writer Jill Lepore, and New Yorker cartoonists discussing the magazine’s cartoon-submission process.
