= Nada Abumrad =

Lebanese-American scientist

- Born: c. 1945 (age c. 80)
- Education: State University of New York Upstate Medical University (PhD)
- Spouse: Naji Abumrad
- Children: Jad

Nada A. Abumrad (born c. 1945) is a Lebanese-American scientist and the Dr. Robert C. Atkins Professor of Medicine and Obesity Research at the Washington University School of Medicine.

== Personal life and education ==
Abumrad was raised in Beirut, with her four siblings. Her mother was a math teacher and her father held several jobs, including for an airline and casino. Abumrad was interested in literature as a child, but chose to pursue biology in college, as a compromise to her parents, who wished that she study medicine. After pursuing degrees in natural science and nutrition from the Faculte Des Sciences and the American University of Beirut in Lebanon, she married Naji Abumrad, raised their son Jad Abumrad, then completed a doctorate in pharmacology at the State University of New York Medical Center.

== Career ==
After earning her PhD, Abumrad joined Syracuse University as a research associate in 1978. The following year, she moved to an associate professorship at Vanderbilt University, where she remained until 1992, when she became a faculty member at the State University of New York at Stony Brook. In 2004, Abumrad was named to the Atkins professorship at the Washington University in St. Louis. The position is the first named professorship in the United States to support the study of obesity. At WashU Medicine, Abumrad is affiliated with the Division of Nutritional Science & Obesity Medicine and the Diabetes Research Center.
