= Jad Abumrad =

American radio host and producer

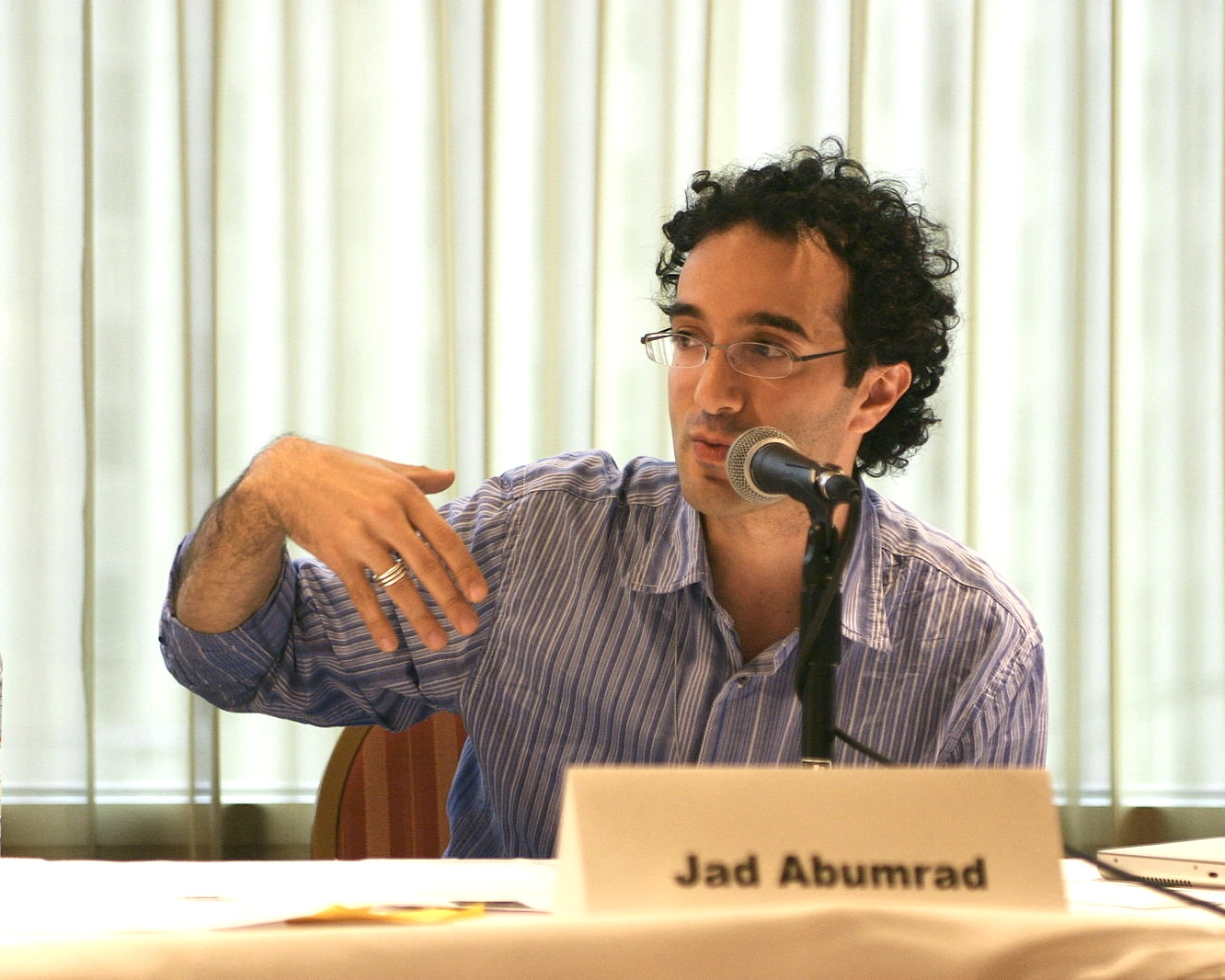
- Abumrad speaking at the Third Coast Audio Festival in 2005
- Born: April 18, 1973 (age 53)
- Education: Oberlin College (BA)
- Occupations: Public radio host and producer
- Notable work: Radiolab
- Spouse: Karla Murthy (m. 2007)
- Children: 2
- Parents: Naji Abumrad (father); Nada Abumrad (mother)
- Awards: MacArthur Fellow (2011), Peabody Awards (2010, 2014, 2019)

Jad Nicholas Abumrad (Note: Arabic: جاد نيكولاس أبومراد) (born April 18, 1973) is an American radio host, composer, and producer.

He is the creator of the syndicated public radio program and podcast Radiolab, which he hosted alongside Robert Krulwich.

Abumrad is a Distinguished Professor of Communication of Science and Technology at Vanderbilt University.

== Early life and education ==
Abumrad was raised in Tennessee where his Lebanese father, Naji Abumrad, is a doctor at Vanderbilt University Medical Center and his mother Nada Abumrad worked as a scientist. Abumrad attended Oberlin College, where he studied creative writing and music composition with a special interest in electronic and electroacoustic music, receiving his BA in 1995.

== Career ==
Before choosing radio as a career, Abumrad composed film scores.

Abumrad has reported and produced documentaries for a number of local and National Public Radio programs, including On the Media, PRI's Studio 360 with Kurt Andersen, Morning Edition, All Things Considered, Democracy Now!, and WNYC's "24 Hours at the Edge of Ground Zero".

From 2002 to January 2022, Abumrad produced and co-hosted the nationally syndicated program Radiolab. His background in music has influenced the sound of Radiolab, which inspired a generation of podcasters.

Abumrad was named a 2011 MacArthur Fellow; the foundation cited his "engaging audio explorations of scientific and philosophical questions" which "captivate listeners and bring to broadcast journalism a distinctive new aesthetic", while using "his background as a composer to orchestrate dialogue, music, and sound effects into compelling documentaries that draw listeners into investigations of otherwise intimidating topics."

Abumrad also produced and hosted the Radiolab special episode The Ring and I, a look at the enduring power of Wagner's Ring Cycle. It aired nationally and internationally and earned ten awards, including the prestigious 2005 National Headliner Grand Award in Radio.

In 2016, Abumrad launched Radiolab's first ever spin-off series, More Perfect, a podcast that tells the stories behind the U.S. Supreme Court's most famous rulings.

In 2018 Abumrad hosted the four-part podcast series "UnErased," which tells the stories of survivors of gay conversion therapy.

In 2019, Abumrad hosted, produced and edited the nine-episode podcast Dolly Parton's America, an in-depth exploration of the life, career, and enduring appeal of country music star and songwriter Dolly Parton. Abumrad interviewed Parton extensively for the podcast. In addition to his journalistic access to her, he also had a familial connection: Parton and Jad's father, Naji, had been friends since Naji was her doctor in the aftermath of a minor car accident. The series won seven national awards, including a George Foster Peabody Award.

In January 2022, Abumrad announced his retirement from Radiolab, handing over the reins to producers Lulu Miller and Latif Nasser.

In 2025, Abumrad created Fela Kuti: Fear No Man, a twelve-part podcast on the life and music of Fela Kuti. The series won a Peabody Award and a Webby Award, and was included in multiple national year-end best-of lists.

== Personal life ==
In 2007, he married Karla Murthy, whom he met in college. Murthy works as a film maker and television producer. The couple have two children, and live in Fort Greene, Brooklyn.
