= Stitcher =

American podcasting company

- Type: Subsidiary
- Industry: Podcasting
- Founded: August 8, 2008; 18 years ago
- Founders: Noah Shanok; Mike Ghaffary; Peter deVroede
- Defunct: August 29, 2023
- Headquarters: New York City, New York, United States
- Owner: SiriusXM
- Subsidiaries: Midroll Media; Earwolf; Stitcher Originals; Stitcher
- Website: Archived August 29, 2023, at the Wayback Machine

Stitcher was a media company that specialized in the creation, distribution, and monetization of podcasts. Stitcher created original shows through networks such as Earwolf and Witness Docs. Stitcher provided ad sales and distribution services to 300+ shows. Stitcher was home to one of the largest podcast listening apps. In July 2020, it was acquired by SiriusXM. The acquisition was finalized by October 19, 2020.

== History ==
Stitcher was founded in 2008 by Noah Shanok, Mike Ghaffary, and Peter deVroede. The company began with just its listening app, entitled "Stitcher", and was venture-backed until 2014 when the company was acquired by Deezer. In 2016, Deezer sold Stitcher for $4.5 million to E.W. Scripps Company, who ran Stitcher under its Midroll Media unit. In 2017, Midroll Media underwent a rebranding, making Stitcher the parent company to Midroll Media and Earwolf, another entity under the E.W. Scripps network.

In July 2020, SiriusXM acquired the Stitcher company for $325 million. Following the acquisition, Sirius XM integrated Stitcher's exclusive podcasts into its additional music and podcast listening service, Pandora. At the peak of its popularity, Stitcher was reported to have nearly 14.5 million weekly users.

In June 2023, Stitcher announced that the podcast service would be discontinued on August 29, 2023, as the parent company, SiriusXM, wanted to focus on incorporating podcasts into the flagship SiriusXM subscription. The production side of the company, Stitcher Studios and Earwolf, continued operations.

== Operations ==
Users could listen to and download podcasts through Stitcher's mobile apps on iOS or Android, as well as through dedicated hardware integrations such as Sonos, Apple CarPlay, Android Auto, Amazon Alexa, or through a web browser. Stitcher also offered Stitcher Premium, a subscription service that allowed listeners to access exclusive ad-free podcasts, which was announced at the end of 2016 and went live early 2017.

Stitcher operated three original content networks with over fifty shows from Earwolf (home to shows like Comedy Bang! Bang!, Office Ladies, How Did This Get Made?), Witness Docs (Unfinished: Deep South, The Dream, Verified), and Stitcher Originals (The Sporkful, By The Book, Science Rules!).

== Reception ==
Prior versions of the app have been recognized as one of the best podcast apps for both Android and iOS.

== See also ==
- List of podcast clients & apps
- Earwolf
- Deezer
- Internet radio
- iPhone
- last.fm
- MeeMix
- Pandora Radio
- Radiolicious
- SoundCloud
- Spotify
- TuneIn
