= There Goes the Neighborhood (podcast) =

WNYC podcast about gentrification

- Genre: History podcast; Political podcast
- Language: American English

Cast and voices
- Hosted by: Kai Wright

Production
- Length: 15-30 Minutes

Publication
- No. of seasons: 3
- Original release: March 2, 2016 – November 7, 2019
- Provider: WNYC Studios; KCRW; The Nation
- Updates: Weekly

Related
- Related shows: 99% Invisible; Crimetown; 2 Dope Queens
- Website: www.wnycstudios.org/podcasts/neighborhood

There Goes the Neighborhood is a political podcast about gentrification.

== Background ==
Season one of the podcast focuses on the city of Brooklyn and is a collaboration between WNYC Studios and The Nation. Season two of the podcast focuses on Los Angeles and is a collaboration between WNYC Studios and KCRW. Season three focuses on the city of Miami and is a collaboration between WNYC Studios and WLRN. The podcast discusses the politics and economics of gentrification as well as systemic racism and white flight. Part way through the production of the podcast co-host Rebecca Carroll learned from her landlords that her home was being torn down and rebuilt.

== Reception ==
The podcast was on The Atlantic's list of "The 50 Best Podcasts of 2016".
