= Naji Abumrad =

American surgeon

- Born: 1944 (age 81–82)
- Education: American University of Beirut (PhD)
- Spouse: Nada
- Children: Jad

Naji N. Abumrad (born 1944) is a Lebanese-American surgeon, currently the John L. Sawyers Professor of Surgery, and formerly the Paul W. Sanger Professor from 1984 to 1992, at Vanderbilt University Medical Center. Abumrad graduated with a BS in Biology and an MD in Medicine at the American University of Beirut in 1971. In 2014, he was elected to the American Association for the Advancement of Science.

In 2020, the singer Dolly Parton donated one million dollars towards research into a COVID-19 vaccine in honor of Abumrad – the pair having become friends after she was treated at Vanderbilt for minor injuries resulting from an October 2013 automobile accident.

He is the father of public radio host Jad Abumrad.
