= Note to Self =

Technology podcast

- Genre: Technology Talk Show
- Running time: ca. 30 min.
- Country of origin: United States
- Language: English
- Home station: WNYC Studios
- Hosted by: Manoush Zomorodi
- Created by: WNYC Studios
- Produced by: Ariana Tobin
- Executive producer: Jen Poyant
- Recording studio: New York City
- Original release: September 2012 – October 2019
- Podcast: Podcast Index

Note to Self was a podcast hosted by Manoush Zomorodi that focused on the impacts of technology on everyday life. Before she began hosting Note to Self, Zomorodi was a television reporter for the British Broadcasting Corporation. Note to Self debuted in September 2012 under the name New Tech City. It was renamed to Note to Self in 2015, and ran until 2019.

Note to Self was produced by WNYC Studios and released new podcast episodes every Wednesday. A shortened version of the podcast aired Wednesdays at 5:50am and 7:50am on 93.9 FM and AM 820.

== Format ==
Manoush Zomorodi described Note to Self as "the tech show about being Human". The content of the podcast was a combination of facts and research as well as real life experiences and personal stories.

Topics covered ranged from racism on Facebook, to a neuroscientist's view on information overload, to a piece by performance artist Marina Abramović which involved an audience sitting in total silence wearing noise-canceling headphones for 30 minutes before a live performance of J.S. Bach's The Goldberg Variations.

== History ==
Zomorodi has worked as a journalist for 20 years, and before joining WNYC, she reported for Reuters and the British Broadcasting Corporation. While working for the British Broadcasting Corporation, Zomorodi lived in Berlin for two years.

Note to Self debuted on September 10, 2012 under the name New Tech City.

On May 27, 2015 New Tech City changed its name to Note to Self, in response to listener suggestions. The name was inspired by the audience communicating to Zomorodi that they listen to the show because they are interested in the "purposeful use of technology."

Zomorodi released a book entitled "Bored and Brilliant: How Spacing Out Can Unlock Your Most Productive and Creative Self" with St. Martin's Press in September 2017. Based on a series of episodes of Note to Self from 2015, the book expands on the benefits of removing distractions to increase well-being and stimulate creativity, and includes feedback from listener responses to the podcast.

Zomorodi left the show in April 2018 to launch a new cryptocurrency supported podcast that was not affiliated with WNYC.

=== Awards ===
Award	Year	Category	Result	Ref.
Academy of Podcasters	2017	Technology	Won	
iHeartRadio Podcast Awards	2019	Best Science & Tech Podcast	Nominated	
