= Death, Sex and Money =

Interview podcast with Anna Sale

Death, Sex & Money
- Other names: DSM
- Genre: Interview talk show
- Running time: ca. 45 min.
- Country of origin: United States
- Language: English
- Home station: Slate
- Hosted by: Anna Sale
- Created by: WNYC Studios (2014–2023); Slate (2024–present)
- Produced by: Zoe Azulay; Cameron Drews; Andrew Dunn
- Executive producer: Daisy Rosario
- Recording studio: New York City
- Original release: May 2014 – Present
- Opening theme: "Take a Ride" by The Reverend John DeLore and Steve Lewis
- Website: https://slate.com/podcasts/death-sex-money
- Podcast: feeds.megaphone.fm/SLT2123367297

Death, Sex & Money is an interview-style podcast hosted by Anna Sale that discusses the big questions "often left out of polite conversation." The podcast launched at WNYC Studios in May 2014 and is currently produced by Slate. It covers the topics of finance, grief, love, and relationships, featuring celebrities and experts, as well as guests with little to no name recognition.

== Format ==
Host Anna Sale describes Death, Sex & Money saying "it really came down to having a show that goes right at the things that shape our lives and that we have the most difficulty navigating—that I was having the most difficulty navigating." In addition to stories from guests, the podcast includes stories from Anna Sale's own life, as well as testimonies and voicemails left by the show's listeners.

In deciding which stories to cover, Sale takes into account current events as well listener suggestions and her own beliefs on what might lead to an interesting conversation.

== History ==
While working at WNYC as a political reporter, Anna Sale submitted her idea for the show to an internal contest at WNYC. Sale describes her inspiration for the podcast as "a reaction to the artifice of politics, here you're talking about things without really talking about them specifically, concretely or honestly." Sale's pitch won the contest and Death, Sex & Money launched in 2014 as a 30-minute podcast.

Celebrity guests on the show have included Jane Fonda, Bill Withers, Dan Savage, and Brooke Shields.

The first episode which aired in 2014 consisted of a conversation with singer Bill Withers about the open-ended topic of how to be a man. Another early episode of the podcast entitled This Senator Saved My Love Life, covered the story of a friendship between Arthur (Sale's then-boyfriend, now-husband) and Wyoming senator Alan Simpson.

On the November 25, 2015, episode of Death, Sex & Money actress Holland Taylor opened up about her sexuality saying, "I haven't come out because I am out," adding, "I live out."

On the May 25, 2015, episode of the podcast, actor Jeff Daniels discussed relapsing at 50 after 14 years of sobriety.

In 2018 Death, Sex and Money won a Webby Award for Best Interview/Talk Show and was also nominated for Best Series and Best Individual Episode. The show won a 2021 Ambies award for "Best Interview Podcast".

WNYC announced the cancellation of the show in October 2023 as part of a larger station-wide cutback. In January 2024, it was acquired by Slate.

== Book ==
Anna Sale wrote Let's Talk About Hard Things, which was published in 2021 by Simon & Schuster. The book is split into five sections: death, sex, money, family, and identity. She conducted a series of new interviews for the book, although she references conversations from the podcast occasionally.

In 2022, Sale appeared on Storybound (podcast) for a conversation regarding her book and having tough conversations.
