= More Perfect =

Podcast about American history and politics

- Genre: History; Political; Law
- Language: American English

Cast and voices
- Hosted by: Jad Abumrad (Seasons 1–3); Julia Longoria (Season 4)

Production
- Length: 30–60 Minutes

Publication
- No. of seasons: 3
- No. of episodes: 31
- Original release: June 2, 2016 – December 4, 2018
- Provider: WNYC Studios
- Updates: Weekly

Related
- Related shows: Throughline; Slow Burn; Pod Save America; Still Processing; Revisionist History; American History Tellers
- Website: www.wnycstudios.org/podcasts/radiolabmoreperfect/

More Perfect, sometimes stylized as Radiolab Presents: More Perfect, is a podcast about American history and politics provided by WNYC Studios. Its first three seasons were hosted by Jad Abumrad. In July 2022, WNYC announced it would return in 2023 for a fourth season, with a new host in Julia Longoria.

== Background ==
The podcast debuted as a spinoff of WNYC's Radiolab on June 2, 2016, with an episode entitled "Cruel and Unusual", which was dedicated to the legal history of the death penalty in the United States. The podcast was developed to focus on the history of decisions made by the Supreme Court. Elie Mystal was the legal editor for the podcast.

On July 14, 2022, WNYC Studios announced that it would return for a fourth season with new host Julia Longoria. The show ended in 2023.

== 27: The Most Perfect Album ==
The podcast's third season was built around 27: The Most Perfect Album, an album dedicated to the Constitution of the United States, with at least one song about each of its amendments. Artists contributing to the project include Cherry Glazerr, who focused on the 1st Amendment; They Might Be Giants with the 3rd Amendment; Dolly Parton's anthem on the 19th Amendment; and Kevin Morby's song for the 24th Amendment.

== Reception ==
The Atlantic included the podcast on their list of "The 50 Best Podcasts of 2016". In 2016, Business Insider listed the podcast as one of "The 50 Best Podcasts for Tech, Science, Entertainment, and Politics". The New Yorker listed the podcast as one of the "Best Podcasts of 2017".

The show won the 2018 Webby award for "Best Sound Design/Original Music Score".
