= City Limits (New York magazine) =

US nonprofit news organization

Coordinates: 40.7283°N 73.9911°W

- Editor: Jarret Murphy
- Categories: non-profit journalism, investigative journalism
- Publisher: Fran Reilly
- Founder: Robert Schur, Ron Shiffman, Philip St. Georges
- Founded: 1976
- Final issue: 2012 (print)
- Based in: New York City
- Website: www.citylimits.org
- ISSN: 0199-0330

City Limits is a nonprofit news organization based in New York City. Since 1976, City Limits has published in-depth reporting on civic issues affecting the city's low- and moderate-income communities. Focused on civic issues related to housing, education, criminal justice, the environment, economic and government policy, City Limits publishes in-depth news and analysis daily.

== History ==
City Limits was founded in February 1976 as a newsletter and resource for advocates in New York City's housing rehabilitation movement. The publication would expand to become an investigative monthly magazine that covered other major policy issues over the next three decades, establishing the Center for an Urban Future in 1996 as a research institution dedicated to exploring policy solutions that were featured in City Limits' reportage.

In 2009, City Limits was acquired by the Community Service Society of New York and re-launched as a single-issue bi-monthly magazine and weekly news website. The publication published a monthly printed magazine for many years and became an all-digital operation in 2012. At that point, it launched the online news website Brooklyn Bureau with support from the Brooklyn Community Foundation, and also acquired the Bronx News Network to create the Bronx Bureau. City Limits became an independent nonprofit in 2014.

== Recognition ==
Since 2009, City Limits received several journalism awards for its investigations, including two Sigma Delta Chi Awards for the September 2010 report, "Risky Play: Was New York City's Shift to Artificial Grass a $300 Million Mistake", and the May 2011 investigation, "Behind Bars: Male Guards, Female Inmates and Sexual Abuse in New York State Prisons".

City Limits has been recognized for its reporting by the Park Center for Independent Media, the Society of Professional Journalists, the Journalism Center on Children & Families, the National Lesbian & Gay Journalists' Association, the National Education Writers' Association, the National Council on Crime & Delinquency, and the New York Community Media Alliance.

In October 2010, City Limits was recognized by the administration of New York City Mayor Michael Bloomberg as a "model for New York City and the rest of the nation."

City Limits was cited as an exemplary model by the John S. and James L. Knight Foundation and the United States White House.
