= Bundyville =

Audio documentary on US militia movements

- Genre: Political podcast
- Format: Investigative journalism
- Language: American English

Cast and voices
- Hosted by: Leah Sottile

Production
- Length: 25-45 minutes

Publication
- No. of seasons: 2
- No. of episodes: 14
- Original release: April 25, 2018 – July 15, 2019
- Provider: Longreads; Oregon Public Broadcasting

Related
- Website: longreads.com/bundyville/

Bundyville is a non-fiction true crime podcast created by Leah Sottile based on nine longform stories written and reported by Sottile. The series ran for two seasons and was produced by Longreads in partnership with Oregon Public Broadcasting.

== Background ==
The show is a true crime podcast hosted by Leah Sottile and produced by Longreads and Oregon Public Broadcasting with episodes available on NPR One. Production was done by Ryan Haas. Leah Sottile was the writer and host of the show. It was co-written by Ryan Haas, Peter Frick-Wright and Robbie Carver. Carver created the music for the show. Anna Griffin of OPB and Mike Dang of Longreads provided creative oversight. Sottile spent over two years reporting on the Bundy family. The podcast has limited audio design and is instead focused on reporting.

=== Season one ===
The first season of the podcast is seven episodes long and focuses on Cliven Bundy and his family. The Bundy family are notorious Western ranchers that fought the government twice and won both times. The first episode of the season introduces the Bundy family from the perspective of national media and discusses the family's conflict with the Federal government of the United States over grazing fees.

The second episode discusses how the US government tested nuclear bombs at the Nevada Test Site in the 1950s.

The podcast discusses how Cliven Bundy owed grazing fees to the Bureau of Land Management for grazing his cattle on federal land. In 2014, Cliven Bundy lead the Bundy standoff because Cliven argued that the federal government cannot legally own land and therefore cannot charge him grazing fees. Cliven stood trial for the standoff, but the case ended as a mistrial because the judge decided the prosecution withheld evidence. Ammon and Ryan followed their father's example two years later. The Occupation of the Malheur National Wildlife Refuge in 2016 was more thoroughly covered in the news so the average American became aware of the Bundys. The occupation was led by Ammon Bundy and Ryan Bundy with support from the sovereign citizen movement. The 40 day occupation culminated with a standoff and shootout with the police. One of the members of the occupation, LaVoy Finicum, was shot by police while reaching for a gun. In the end, 27 people were arrested, including Ammon and Ryan. During the occupation, the occupying force desecrated sacred artifacts belonging to the Burns Paiute Tribe and caused $6 million in damages to the Wildlife Refuge. After the occupation, Ammon and Ryan convinced the jury that they were peaceful protestors and were acquitted and set free. Once the occupation and subsequent trial ended the Bundy family have largely been absent from national news.

Sottile and Haas traveled to the abandoned town of Bundyville to explore the family's history. The podcast discusses how the Bundy family ancestors moved to the American West where they established the town of Bundyville in the 1890s to escape the persecution of Mormons. The Bundy family claim they have legal rights to the land because the land has been in the family for generations, but Sottile was unable to find any evidence that the land is the inheritance of Cliven Bundy. The podcast addresses the fact that the family's religious beliefs are based on the White Horse Prophecy—a fringe Mormon belief that is not officially recognized by the Church of Jesus Christ of Latter-day Saints. The show suggests that the religious beliefs of the family are cult-like, radical, and obsessive. The show discusses how the Bundy family came to their extremist views and how their ideology is rooted in white supremacy and the historical omission of the Indigenous peoples of the Americas who lived on the land before the Bundy family. The show also addresses the family's white supremacist beliefs directly by mentioning direct quotes from Cliven and Ryan. In 2014 Cliven said "[black people] abort their young children, they put their young men in jail, because they never learned how to pick cotton," and in 2016 Ryan said "Native Americans had the claim to the land, but they lost that claim... the current culture is the most important." The show addresses how the Bundys' claim they are representative of rural ranchers in America but demonstrates that they are not.

Journalism since the 2016 presidential election has attempted to understand current events and needlessly sympathizes or justifies terrible people. The show tries to understand why the Bundy family would do what they do but does not excuse or justify their actions. Sottile spent two years reporting on the family and extensively researched the Bundy family ideology, and when Sottile interviews Cliven and Ryan they confirm Sottile's research. The show requires an intimate look at the Bundy family and attempts to balance between explaining extremism and unintentionally providing a sympathetic light for the Bundy family. For instance, Sottile compares Cliven to a grandfather that you might feel affection for during her interview with him. The quotes from Cliven and Ryan help balance the reporting. However, Ann-Derrick Gaillot from The Outline criticizes the podcast for how much Sottile focuses on the Bundy's side of things claiming that Sottile inadvertently humanized the family.

The podcast argues that the success of the Bundy standoff and the Occupation of the Malheur National Wildlife Refuge were not accidents or coincidence but are the sign of shifting perspectives on public land and protests. The show anticipates that bad things will happen if people like the Bundys continue to gain political power.

=== Season two ===
Season two was a seven part series. The second season was released in July 2019. Season two explores anti-government extremism more broadly. Sottile notes that the patriot movement contributed to the 2021 United States Capitol attack.

== Episodes ==
=== Season trailers ===
Title	Running time	Original release date
"Bundyville Trailer"	2:16	March 25, 2018
"Bundyville: The Remnant Trailer"	2:11	June 26, 2019
"Bundyville Live Q&A, July 2019"	60:34	August 7, 2019
"Cat People - A new podcast from Longreads"	3:37	January 31, 2020
"Timber Wars: A New Podcast for Bundyville Fans"	31:54	November 19, 2020

=== Season one: Bundyville ===
No.	Title	Running time	Original release date
1	"The Battle"	43:24	May 14, 2018
This episode discusses the Waco siege and the Ruby Ridge siege
2	"The Bomb"	25:09	May 14, 2018
This episode discusses how the US government tested nuclear bombs at the Nevada Test Site in the 1950s. The episode also discusses Timothy McVeigh and the Oklahoma City bombing.
3	"The Prophecy"	24:08	May 14, 2018
This episode discusses the Bundy family's faith in the Church of Jesus Christ of Latter-day Saints and the White Horse Prophecy.
4	"The Living Room"	29:45	May 14, 2018
This episode includes an interview with Cliven Bundy at his home in Bunkerville, Nevada.
5	"The Followers"	25:29	May 14, 2018
In this episode Sottile and Haas travel to the abandoned town named Bundyville to discuss the Bundy family history.
6	"The Murders"	25:06	May 14, 2018
This episode discusses the consequences of the conflicts involving the Bundy family.
7	"The Future"	32:00	May 14, 2018
This episode discusses Ryan C. Bundy and why he ran for governor in the 2018 Nevada gubernatorial election.

=== Season two: The Remnant ===
No.	Title	Running time	Original release date
1	"The Explosion"	27:43	July 15, 2019
This episode discusses a 2016 bombing that occurred in Panaca, Nevada.
2	"The Bomber"	35:56	July 15, 2019
This episode discusses the 2016 bombing of a Bureau of Land Management cabin. The episode also discusses how the bombing was connected to the patriot movement.
3	"The Martyr"	31:57	July 15, 2019
This episode discuss how LaVoy Finicum became a martyr for the patriot movement.
4	"The Homeland"	23:31	July 15, 2019
This episode discusses how Stevens County, Washington has a history of white supremacist and anti-government violence.
5	"The Politician"	24:42	July 15, 2019
This episode discusses how extremist language has been adopted by politicians such as Matt Shea.
6	"The Preachers"	38:33	July 15, 2019
This episode discusses Marble Community Fellowship in Stevens County and their millenarianist eschatology.
7	"The Bombshell"	38:10	July 15, 2019
This episode discusses how the 2016 bombing in Panaca was connected to the patriot movement.

== Reception ==
The podcast had over one million listens in early October 2019 and three million listeners by late October 2019.

Nicholas Quah wrote in Vulture that the show was "tenacious, shedding light on an unsettling, often under-covered slice of American society" and the findings of the show were "surprising and surreal." Toby Ball wrote in Vulture that the show was a "fascinating and harrowing listen." Mitch Ryals wrote in Inlander that the show was "deeply reported and totally bingeable." Angela K. Evans wrote in Boulder Weekly that the show is a "long-winding journey of discovery, ending with prescient questions and observations" that are relevant to current events. Laura Jane Standley and Eric McQuade wrote in The Atlantic that "the podcast succeeds as an indispensable document on the clashes between ranchers and the feds." Laura Krantz commented on the podcast saying that Sottile "is a great storyteller [who] goes in and has conversations that are hard to have."

=== Awards ===
Award	Date	Category	Result	Ref.
Society of Professional Journalists	2019	Reporting Series	Runner-up	
Online Journalism Award	2018	Excellence in Audio Digital Storytelling, Small Newsroom	Finalist	
National Magazine Awards	2019	Podcasting	Finalist	
National Magazine Awards	2020	Podcasting	Finalist	

== See also ==
- No Compromise (podcast)
- Two Minutes Past Nine
- List of podcasts about racism
