= Two Minutes Past Nine =

BBC podcast hosted by Leah Sottile

Two Minutes Past Nine is a podcast hosted by Leah Sottile and produced by BBC Radio 4.

== Background ==
The podcast tries to explain the ideology of Timothy McVeigh, who was responsible for the 1995 Oklahoma City bombing. Sottile argues that the bombing was deeply rooted in bigotry and anti-government convictions inspired by figures going as far back as John Wilkes Booth and more recent figures such as William Luther Pierce. The podcast discusses various people who believe that there will be a race war and that the government is attempting to take their guns. Sottile connects McVeigh, the Proud Boys, and the January 6 United States Capitol attack.

== Format ==
The podcast is a BBC Radio 4 program hosted by Leah Sottile and produced by Georgia Catt. The series included 12 episodes, each roughly 15 minutes long, released in 2020.

== Reception ==
Nicholas Quah wrote in Vulture that the podcast was "refreshing for the sobriety of its presentation." Charlotte Runcie wrote in The Daily Telegraph that the podcast is "powerfully told ... [and] beautifully made."

== See also ==
- Bundyville
- No Compromise (podcast)
- List of podcasts about racism
