= No Compromise (podcast) =

2020 NPR podcast about gun rights

No Compromise is a podcast hosted by Lisa Hagen and Chris Haxel and produced by NPR.

== Background ==
The podcast is hosted by Lisa Hagen and Chris Haxel and produced by NPR. The podcast debuted in September 2020 and is a six part series. The series features an interview with Jennifer Ellis, co-founder of the anti-extremist group, Idaho Conservatives.

== Reception ==
Laura Jane Standley and Eric McQuade praised the podcast in The Atlantic saying that it "successfully humanize[s] all sides of this polarizing issue." Nicholas Quah criticized the podcast for a similar reason saying that the podcast has "real problems with tone control" and that in an effort to understand far right ideology the podcast glosses over the dangers of the ideology. Mara Davis wrote in Paste Magazine that the podcast is a "superb NPR series." The podcast won the 2021 Pulitzer Prize for Audio Reporting.

== See also ==
- Bundyville
- Two Minutes Past Nine
- List of podcasts about racism
