= Vallow =

Vallow is a surname. Notable people with the surname include:

- Kara Vallow (born 1967), American television producer
- Charles Vallow and his adopted son J. J. Vallow, murder victims from Arizona, United States
- Lori Vallow, American woman convicted of murdering her children Tylee Ryan and J. J. Vallow and of conspiring to murder her husband Charles Vallow
- Scott Vallow (born 1977), American soccer player
