= Jacob Fries =

Jacob Fries may refer to:

- Jakob Friedrich Fries (1773–1843), German philosopher
- Jacob H. Fries (born 1978), American journalist
