= Daybell =

Daybell is a surname. Notable people with the surname include:

- Kim Daybell (born 1992), British tennis player
- Chad Daybell (born 1968), American author from Idaho convicted of murder and conspiracy to commit murder in the deaths of his first wife and his second wife's children
- Lori Vallow Daybell (born 1973), American woman from Arizona convicted of murder and conspiracy to commit murder in the deaths of her husband, her children and her next husband's wife
