= List of podcasts about racism =

The following is a list of podcasts about racism.

== List ==
| Podcast | Year | Starring, Narrator(s), or Host(s) | Produced by | Ref |
|---|---|---|---|---|
| Floodlines | 2020 | Vann R. Newkirk II | The Atlantic | |
| Holy Week: The Story of a Revolution Undone | 2022 | Vann R. Newkirk II | The Atlantic | |
| The Official Watchmen Podcast | 2019–2020 | Craig Mazin and Damon Lindelof | HBO | |
| The Nod | 2017–present | Brittany Luse and Eric Eddings | Gimlet Media | |
| Witness Black History | 2010–2016 | | BBC World Service | |
| About Race | 2018 | Reni Eddo-Lodge | Independent | |
| Code Switch | 2016–present | Gene Demby and Shereen Marisol Meraji | NPR | |
| Sandy and Nora Talk Politics | 2017–present | Sandy Hudson and Nora Loreto | Independent | |
| Yo, Is This Racist? | 2020–present | Andrew Ti and Tawny Newsome | Earwolf | |
| Pod Save the People | 2017–present | DeRay Mckesson, Kaya Henderson, and De’Ara Balenger | Crooked Media | |
| 1619 | 2019 | Nikole Hannah-Jones | The New York Times | |
| Ear Hustle | 2017–present | Nigel Poor and Earlonne Woods | Radiotopia | |
| The Breakdown | 2020 | Shaun King | The North Star | |
| No Country for Young Women | 2018–2020 | Sadia Azmat and Monty Onanuga | BBC Radio | |
| White Homework | 2019–present | Tori Williams Douglass | Independent | |
| All My Relations | 2019–present | Matika Wilbur, Desi Small-Rodriguez, and Adrienne Keene | Independent | |
| Throughline | 2019–present | Rund Abdelfatah and Ramtin Arablouei | NPR | |
| Don't Call Me Resilient | 2021–present | Vinita Srivastava | The Conversation | |
| Still Processing | 2016–present | Wesley Morris and Jenna Wortham | The New York Times | |
| Black Wall Street 1921 | 2020 | Nia Clark | Independent | |
| Say Your Mind | 2017–present | Kelechi Okafor | Independent | |
| Slay In Your Lane | 2020 | Yomi Adegoke and Elizabeth Uviebinené | Studio71 UK | |
| There Goes the Neighborhood | 2016–2019 | Kai Wright | WNYC Studios, The Nation, and KCRW | |
| Better Call Marie | 2020 | Dasylva Marie | Independent | |
| Black Men Can't Jump (In Hollywood) | 2015–present | Jonathan Braylock, Jerah Milligan, and James III | Forever Dog | |
| More Perfect | 2016–2018 | Jad Abumrad | WNYC Studios | |
| Nice White Parents | 2020 | Chana Joffe-Walt | Serial, The New York Times | |
