= Jesuit High School (Beaverton, Oregon) =

Location
- 9000 SW Beaverton-Hillsdale Highway; Portland, Oregon 97225; United States; 45°29′8″N 122°46′11″W

Information
- Type: Private; College-preparatory; Catholic school
- Motto: Age Quod Agis (Latin); Do Well Whatever You Do
- Religious affiliations: Roman Catholic (Jesuit)
- Established: 1956; 70 years ago
- President: Thomas D. Arndorfer
- Teaching staff: 99 (FTE)
- Grades: 9–12
- Gender: Co-Educational
- Enrollment: 1280 (2024-25)
- Student to teacher ratio: 15:1
- Colors: Green and gold
- Athletics conference: OSAA Metro League 6A-2
- Team name: Crusaders
- Accreditation: NWAC
- Newspaper: The Jesuit Chronicle
- Tuition: $23,575
- Website: jesuitportland.org
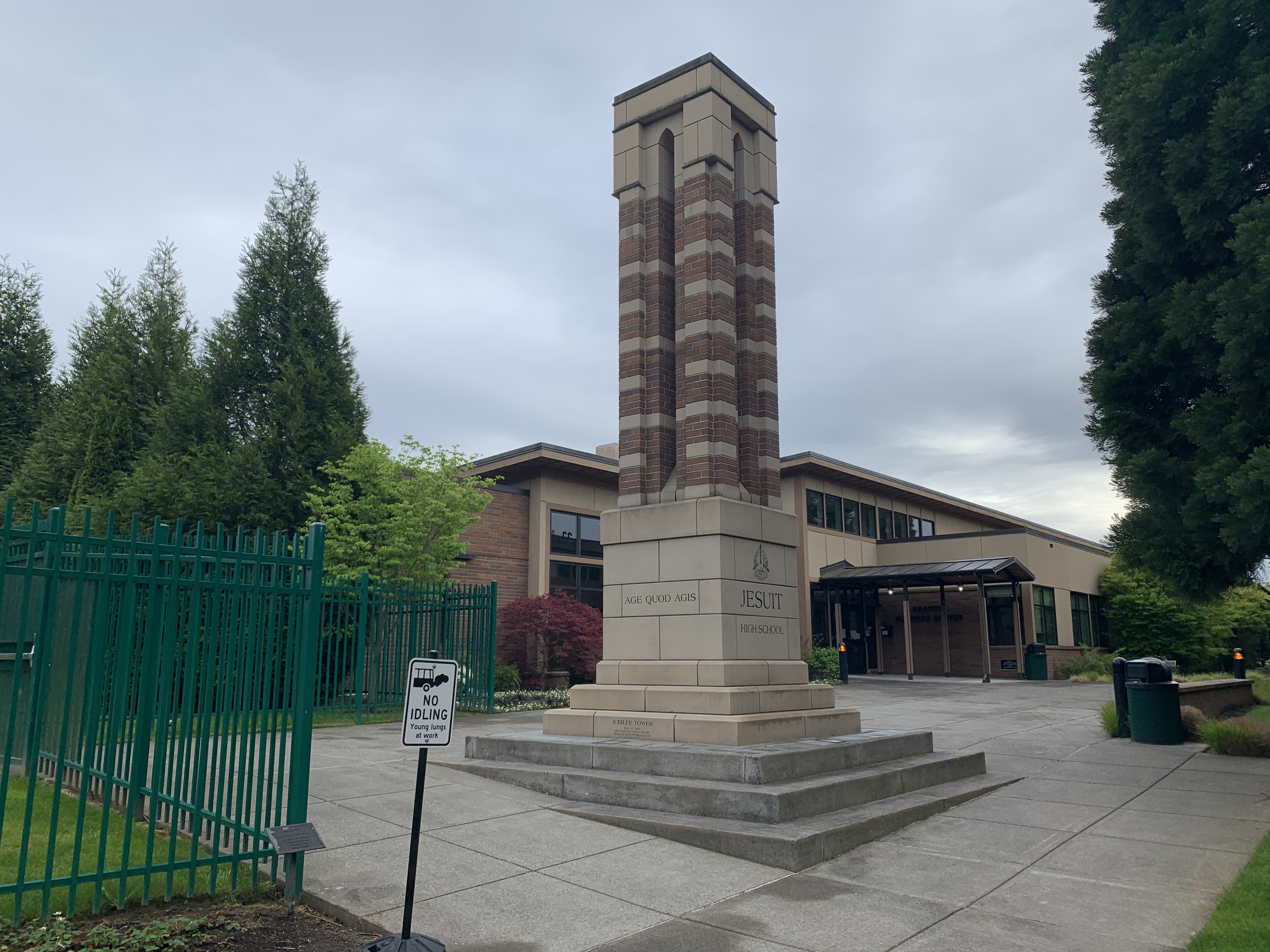

Jesuit High School is a private, Catholic, college-preparatory school in Beaverton, Oregon, United States. It was founded by the Jesuits in 1956 and uses a Jesuit, college-preparatory curriculum. It is coeducational and enrolls approximately 1,300 students of all faiths.

== History ==
The school was the 43rd Jesuit High School to be established in the United States. Though it was not finally established until 1956, the process of founding a Jesuit High School in Portland began in 1907, when property was purchased by the parish of St. Ignatius and set aside for a future High School. A lay appeal to the Jesuit Provincial for a High School in 1929 came to nothing. In 1954 the Holy Cross Fathers of Portland announced the closing of Columbia Prep and a plan for the Jesuits to take over the premises was discussed, but again dropped. Finally in 1955 the Jesuit Provincial Superior was asked by the Archbishop to set up a school. Hillsdale Dairy Farm, a 55-acre (220,000 m^{2}) plot to the west, some 15 minutes drive from downtown Portland, was purchased for $165,000. Jesuit and Holy Cross priests raised pledges of $117,000 by Wednesday of the first week of a fund-raising campaign in churches, and hundreds of thousands more by door-to-door canvassing. Jesuit High School opened for freshmen boys on September 10, 1956 and girls have been admitted since 1993.

== Demographics ==
The demographic breakdown of the 1,280 students enrolled in 2024-2025 was:

- Native American/Alaskan - 2.0%
- Black - 4.0%
- Hispanic - 7.0%
- Multiracial - 11.0%
- Asian/Pacific islanders - 19.0%
- White - 58.0%

For the 2024-2025 school year, 99% of the graduating senior class enrolled in college, 23% of the overall student body was receiving financial aid, and 62% of students identified as Catholic.

== Academics ==
Since 1961, Jesuit High School has been accredited through Northwest Accreditation Commission and has also been ranked 3rd best overall school and 1st best Christian School.

In 1989 and 1998, Jesuit High School was honored in the Blue Ribbon Schools Program, the highest honor a school can receive in the United States.

== Sports ==
Jesuit won its first two athletic state championships in football in 1967 (tied) and 1968. Since then, Jesuit has amassed a total of 214 state titles across 25 different sports through the 2025-2026 school year. Its greatest successes have been in tennis, with a combined 42 titles between men (24) and women (18), soccer with 35 combined titles (men - 18; women - 17), cross county with 26 combined titles (men - 8; women - 18) and swimming with 25 combined titles (men - 13; women - 12).

On June 20, 2007, Sports Illustrated rated Jesuit the number one high school athletic program in the nation, citing success both on and off the field and did so again 2010.

In 2016 and again in 2019, Jesuit was named a top high school athletic program in the nation by MaxPreps.

Through the 2022-2023 school year, Jesuit was a 28 time winner of the Oregon Athletic Coaches Association (OACA) All-Sports award in the division they competed in. In addition, Jesuit was awarded the Oregon School Activities Association (OSAA) Cup 20 times between the 1999-2000 and 2024-2025 academic years, including an 8 year streak between the 2004-2005 and 2012-2013 seasons.

Jesuit is currently an OSAA 6A classification school and competes in the 6A-2 Metro League.

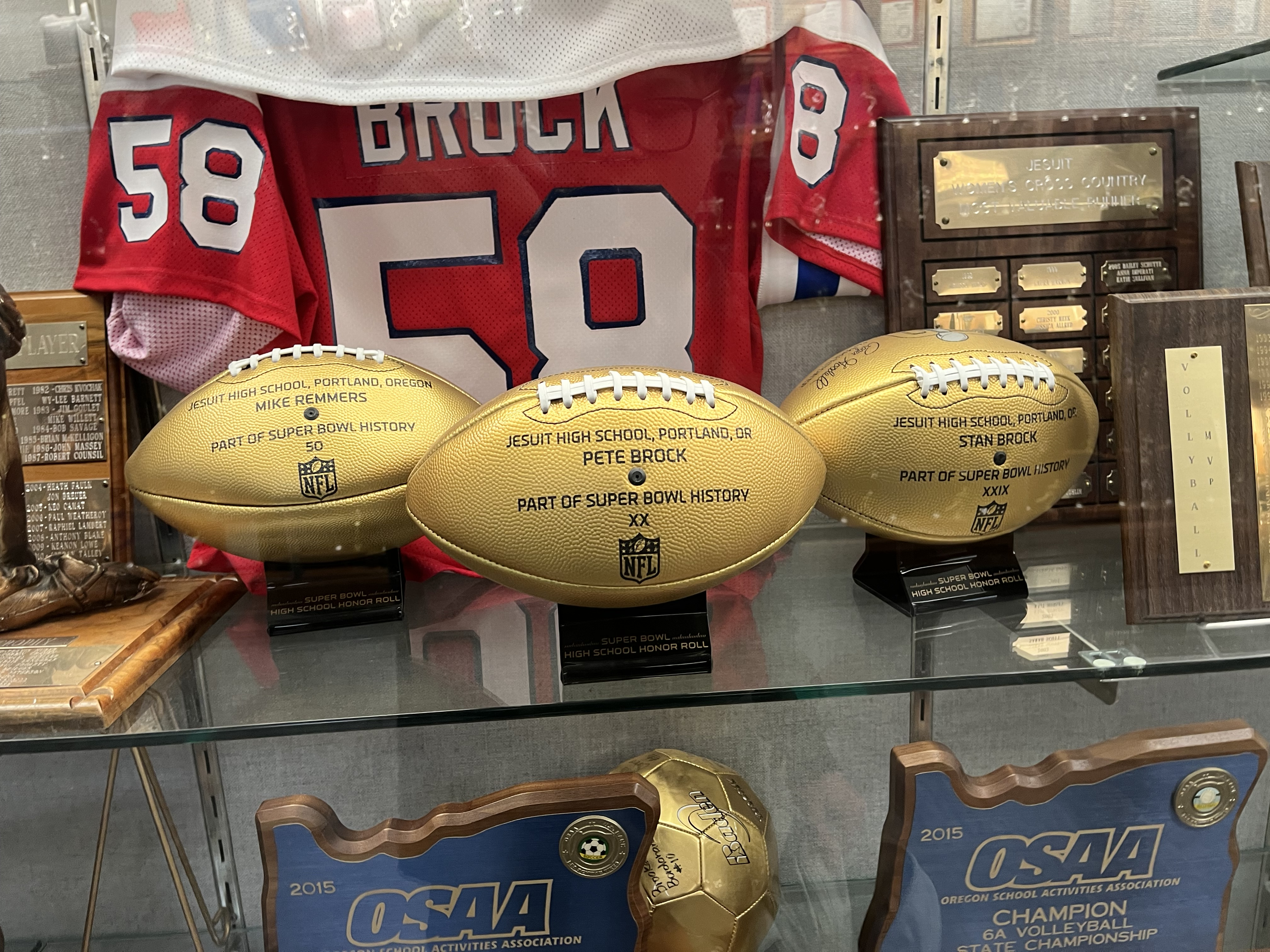
Display case showing three alums who made it to the super bowl: Mike Remmers Pete Brock Stan Brock

=== State titles ===
- Alpine Skiing (women, non-OSAA): 1971, 1973, 1975, 2013
- Alpine Skiing (women, non-OSAA): 2003, 2011, 2012, 2014
- Baseball: 2016, 2019
- Basketball (men): 1999, 2005, 2009, 2010, 2011, 2012, 2019
- Basketball (women): 2011
- Cheerleading: 1996
- Chess (non-OSAA): 2022, 2024, 2025
- Cross Country (men): 2000, 2002, 2004, 2008, 2017, 2021, 2022, 2025
- Cross Country (women): 1996, 1998, 1999, 2002, 2003, 2004, 2005, 2006, 2007, 2008, 2009, 2010, 2016, 2017, 2022, 2023, 2024, 2025
- Football: 1967 [co‐champion], 1968, 2000, 2005, 2006, 2015
- Golf (men): 1996, 1998, 2000, 2007, 2008, 2011, 2017, 2018, 2019
- Golf (women): 2004, 2005, 2018, 2019, 2022, 2023, 2024, 2025, 2026
- Lacrosse (men, non-OSAA): 2022, 2023, 2024
- Lacrosse (women, non-OSAA): 2019, 2022, 2023, 2024, 2025
- Soccer (men): 1986, 1987, 1988, 1991, 1992, 1993, 1994, 1999, 2000, 2001, 2005, 2010, 2012, 2013, 2018, 2022, 2024, 2025
- Soccer (women): 1994, 1995, 1996, 1997, 1998, 1999, 2001, 2002, 2009, 2010, 2015, 2017, 2018, 2019, 2022, 2024, 2025
- Softball: 2006, 2016
- Swimming (men): 2006, 2007, 2015, 2016, 2017, 2018, 2019, 2020, 2023, 2024, 2025, 2026
- Swimming (women): 1996, 2002, 2009, 2010, 2011, 2012, 2013, 2016, 2019, 2020, 2023, 2024, 2025, 2026
- Tennis (men): 1974, 1975, 1976, 1978, 1979, 1980, 1983, 1984, 1998, 1999, 2000, 2008, 2009, 2010, 2011, 2012, 2013, 2014, 2016, 2017, 2018, 2019, 2024, 2025
- Tennis (women): 1994, 1995, 1996, 1997, 1998, 1999, 2002, 2005, 2006, 2007, 2008, 2009, 2012, 2014, 2015, 2023, 2024, 2025
- Track and Field (men): 2006, 2013, 2014, 2025
- Track and Field (women): 2008, 2010, 2011, 2016, 2017, 2018, 2025
- Volleyball: 2004, 2008, 2012, 2014, 2015, 2018, 2019, 2023, 2024, 2025

Playoffs were not played in Oregon high school sports and therefore no state champions were declared during the 2020-21 school year due to the COVID-19 pandemic.

== Notable alumni ==
- Mick Abel, 15th overall MLB 2020 draft pick for the Philadelphia Phillies
- David Adelman, head coach of the Denver Nuggets
- Timothy Boyle, CEO of Columbia Sportswear
- H. W. Brands, author, professor
- Sophia Braun, player on Argentina women’s national football team
- Richard Brenneke, businessman
- Pete Brock, former National Football League football player
- Stan Brock, former NFL football player and coach
- Chris Brown, ex-MLS midfielder
- Xavier Coleman, NFL cornerback, New York Jets
- Sydney Collins, NWSL defender, Bay FC
- Mike Dunleavy Jr., former NBA basketball player, currently serving as the General Manager for the Golden State Warriors
- Katie Duong, soccer player
- Sam Forstag, smokejumper and union leader, member of the United States House of Representatives for Montana
- Mike Hass, former football wide receiver
- Stephen Holt, pro basketball player, Barangay Ginebra San Miguel
- Jaxson Kirkland, NFL offensive guard, Cincinnati Bengals
- Travis Knight, animator
- Owen Marecic, former NFL football fullback
- Noble Meyer, 10th overall MLB 2023 draft pick for the Miami Marlins
- Brian Michaelson, former player and current assistant coach for Gonzaga Bulldogs men's basketball
- Henry Mondeaux, NFL defensive end, Pittsburgh Steelers
- Morgan Murphy, comedian
- Mike Nearman, politician
- Blake Nelson, author
- David Norrie, Rose Bowl QB UCLA, College football announcer for ABC
- Slade Norris, former NFL linebacker
- Preston Parsons, former NFL football quarterback
- Mike Remmers, NFL football offensive tackle, Kansas City Chiefs
- Leah Sottile, journalist
- Erik Spoelstra, championship winning NBA head coach of Miami Heat
- Seth Tarver, basketball player, currently a free agent
- Kyle Wiltjer, pro basketball player

== Other sources ==
- Schoenberg, S.J., Wilfred P. Jesuits in Oregon, 1844-1959. The Oregon-Jesuit, 1959 (Centennial Year)
