= Holy Week: The Story of a Revolution Undone =

Podcast about MLK by The Atlantic

Holy Week: The Story of a Revolution Undone is a podcast by The Atlantic.

== Background ==
The podcast was inspired by the George Floyd protests. Newkirk also felt that the uprisings after MLK's assassination have not received the media attention that it deserves. The podcast is hosted by Vann R. Newkirk II and produced by The Atlantic. The podcast is a follow up to Floodlines. The podcast looks at the legacy of MLK 55 years after his assassination. The podcast contains music by Julius Eastman. The show contains archival material and four eyewitness accounts. Newkirk used sources from the DC Public Library and the DC History Center. The podcast discusses the Holy Week Uprising. Vanessa Lawson Dixon is one of the interviewees who was there during the riots. The podcast also covers the Watts riots. The podcast discusses what was happening in the White House during Lyndon B. Johnson's presidency. The podcast discusses Johnson's Kerner Commission and the "Negro Marshall Plan". In the podcast, Newkirk poses the question of what America would look like if MLK's vision had been embraced and things such as a job guarantee and a zero poverty rate were enacted as policy.

== See also ==
- Floodlines
