= When the Moon Turns to Blood =

2022 true crime book by Leah Sottile

- First edition cover
- Author: Leah Sottile
- Publisher: Twelve Books

When the Moon Turns to Blood: Lori Vallow, Chad Daybell, and a Story of Murder, Wild Faith, and End Times is a true crime book written by Leah Sottile and published by Twelve Books.

== Background ==
The title comes from the Book of Revelation during which the moon is prophesied to turn red like blood. The book discusses the killings of Tylee Ryan and J. J. Vallow. Sottile focuses on the extremist Mormon beliefs of the children's mother Lori Vallow and her lover Chad Daybell. They were particularly fond of apocalyptic literature. Vallow and Daybell were arrested in Hawaii after the children were reported missing. They were found buried in Daybell's backyard in Idaho in June of 2020.

== Reception ==
The book was a 2023 Oregon Book Awards Finalist for the Frances Fuller Victor Award for General Nonfiction. John Dehlin, of the Mormon Stories Podcast, called it "a critical book for understanding 21st century Mormonism," and Courtney Eathorne wrote in Booklist that the book is an "exquisitely researched history of LDS and its fringe offshoots." Ron Sylvester wrote in the Spokesman-Review that “Sottile uses the story, unthinkable to most parents, that a mom would participate in the killing of her own children, to weave together an unhealthy obsession, shared by a large swath of Americans that poisons both Christianity and conservative politics.” The Publishers Weekly review says that Sottile's "attempts to impose broader significance will fall flat for many”.
