= Pete Brock (American football) =

American football player (born 1954)

No. 58
- Positions: Center, tackle, guard

Personal information
- Born: July 14, 1954 (age 72); Portland, Oregon, U.S.
- Listed height: 6 ft 5 in (1.96 m)
- Listed weight: 267 lb (121 kg)

Career information
- High school: Jesuit (OR)
- College: Colorado
- NFL draft: 1976: 1st round, 12th overall pick

Career history
- New England Patriots (1976–1987)

Awards and highlights
- First-team All-American (1975); Second-team All-Big Eight (1975)

Career NFL statistics
- Games played: 154
- Games started: 88
- Fumble recoveries: 5
- Stats at Pro Football Reference

Peter Anthony Brock (born July 14, 1954) is an American former professional football player who was a center and guard for 12 seasons with the New England Patriots of the National Football League (NFL). Brock played college football for the Colorado Buffaloes.

Brock was the starting center 78 times, starting left guard three times, starting left tackle six times and the starting right guard once in the 154 regular season games that he played for the New England Patriots. He wore #58. He is a part of the New England Patriots 1980s All-Decade Team.

Brock won the Ed Block Courage Award in 1985. He currently works as the President of the New England Patriots Alumni and announces college football games. He has his own segment called "Brock's Breakdown" as part of the pre-game show on 98.5 FM, the Sports Hub in Boston; in 2001 he also replaced Gino Cappelletti as color analyst on the Patriots' radio network for the first eight games of that season because of illness to Cappelletti.

Brock's younger brother Stan also played in college for Colorado and also in the NFL.
