= Leah Sottile =

American journalist

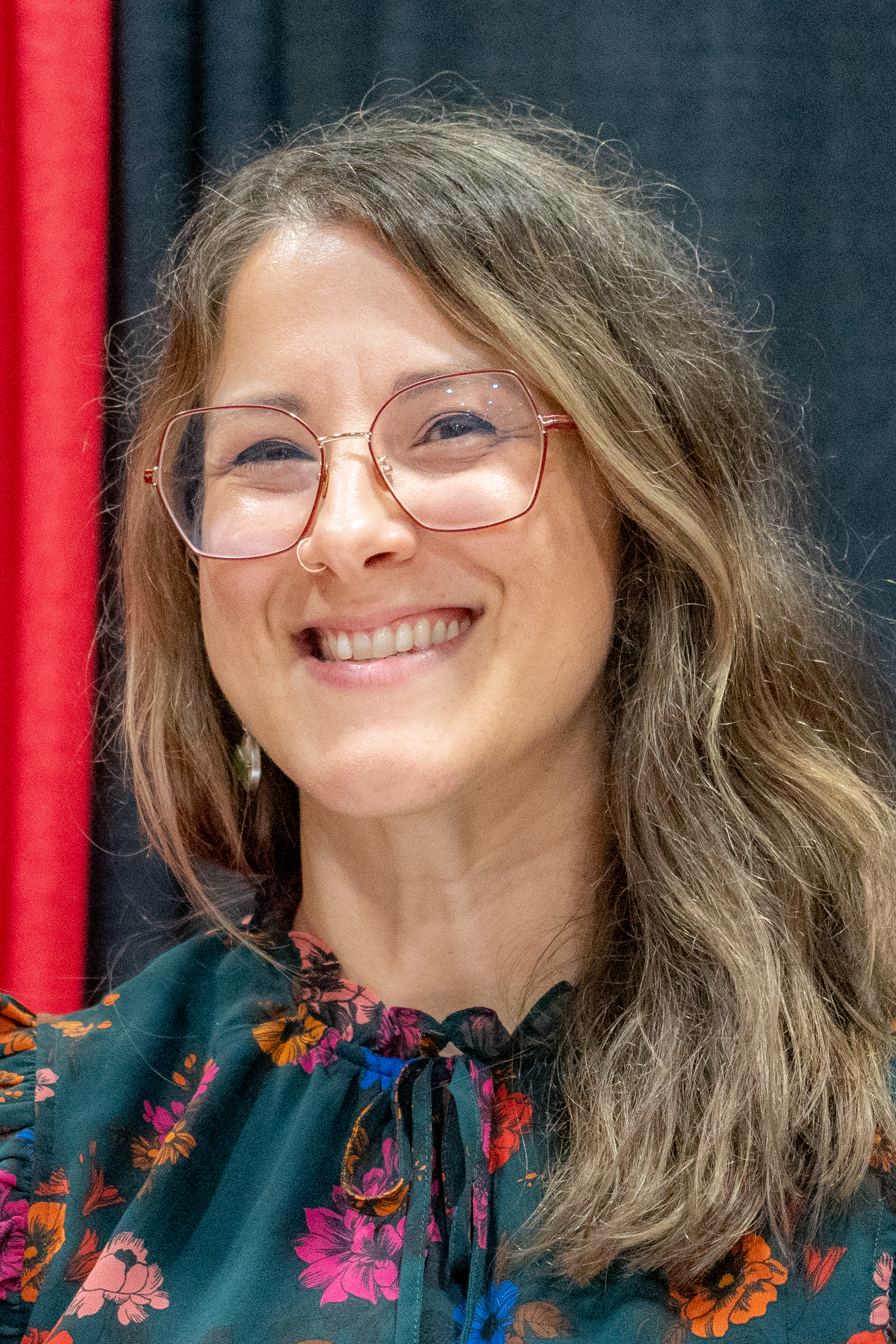
- Sottile at National Book Festival 2025
- Education: Jesuit High School (Beaverton, Oregon)
- Alma mater: Gonzaga University
- Occupation: Journalist

Leah Sottile is an American journalist, writer, and podcast host who lives in Portland, Oregon.

== Education ==
Sottile graduated from Gonzaga University in 2003.

== Career ==
Sottile is the author of two books: Blazing Eye Sees All: Love Has Won, False Prophets and the Fever Dream of the American New Age and When the Moon Turns to Blood, about the Vallow/Daybell case.

Sottile covered the Malheur occupation court trials for The Washington Post and Outside, and regularly talked about the trials as a guest on Oregon Public Broadcasting programming. She is the host of the podcasts Bundyville and Bundyville: The Remnant, produced through Longreads. In 2020, she hosted Two Minutes Past Nine produced by BBC Radio 4. In 2023, she hosted Burn Wild, also produced by the BBC, which looks into the legacy of the Earth Liberation Front. She has written for Rolling Stone, Outside, High Country News and The Washington Post on subjects related to the American West.

Sottile was also the music editor of Spokane, Washington's alt-weekly newspaper, The Inlander. She characterizes bands in Spokane as "willing to take a lot more risks," and also says that: "It's super easy to disregard Spokane. It's seen as a cultural void. But there is a really mobilized youth art movement here that's always anchored in the music scene. I've seen shows in boxing rings, art centers, [and] all kinds of alternative spaces. People in Spokane are scrappy about making it work. That's the backbone of the scene: making a party where there wasn't one before."

Sottile won first place in a Society of Professional Journalists 2015 competition for the Willamette Week article "The Newest Portlanders". Sottile has been a professor of journalism at the University of Montana.

While on staff with The Inlander, Sottile won the Washington State 2011–2012 Mental Health Reporting Award for "The People Left Behind," which features "an in-depth exploration of a 13-year-old's death by suicide and the broader issues of mental health and suicide-prevention in Spokane and the Inland Empire". She also won third place in a Society of Professional Journalists 2010 competition for "Blood Sport," an article on backyard wrestling in Spokane.

Sottile was also a guest on KUOW-FM programming, where she talked about an article she wrote for Outside about a Bigfoot sighting by Bob Gimlin.
