= Stan Brock (American football) =

American football player and coach (born 1958)

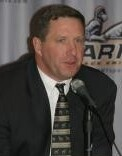
- Brock in 2007

No. 67
- Position: Offensive tackle

Personal information
- Born: June 8, 1958 (age 68); Beaverton, Oregon, U.S.
- Listed height: 6 ft 6 in (1.98 m)
- Listed weight: 295 lb (134 kg)

Career information
- High school: Jesuit (Beaverton, Oregon)
- College: Colorado
- NFL draft: 1980: 1st round, 12th overall pick

Career history

Playing
- New Orleans Saints (1980–1992); San Diego Chargers (1993–1995)

Coaching
- Portland Forest Dragons (1997–1999); Los Angeles Avengers (2000–2001); Army (OL, 2004–2006); Army (2007–2008)

Awards and highlights
- PFWA All-Rookie Team (1980); New Orleans Saints Hall of Fame; New Orleans Saints 45th Anniversary Team; First-team All-Big Eight (1979)

Career NFL statistics
- Games played: 234
- Games started: 223
- Fumble recoveries: 7
- Stats at Pro Football Reference

Stanley James Brock (born June 8, 1958) is an American former football player and coach. He played professionally as a tackle in the National Football League (NFL) for the New Orleans Saints and the San Diego Chargers.

Brock played college football for the Colorado Buffaloes and was selected in the first round of the 1980 NFL draft with the 18th overall pick. After his playing career, he served as the head football coach at United States Military Academy from 2007 to 2008. Brock was fired on December 12, 2008, after compiling a 6–18 record in two years as head coach.

== Playing career ==
=== College ===
Brock played football at Jesuit High School in his hometown of Portland before attending the University of Colorado at Boulder where he played under coaches Bill Mallory and Chuck Fairbanks. He was selected to the first team All-American by The Sporting News. as a senior in 1979. He was also selected as first team all Big Eight Conference and the John Mack Award winner, Colorado's award for offensive MVP.

=== NFL ===
Brock played for the New Orleans Saints from 1980 to 1992. He finished his career with the San Diego Chargers from 1993 to 1995. He played in Super Bowl XXIX for the Chargers. Stan's older brother Pete also played in the NFL for the Patriots, starting at center in Super Bowl XX, which coincidentally was played in New Orleans.

Brock was inducted into the New Orleans Saints Hall of Fame in 1997.

== Coaching career ==
After his playing career, Brock became a coach in the Arena Football League (AFL), where he served as the head coach of the Portland Forest Dragons (1997–1999) and the Los Angeles Avengers (2000–2001). He also was a color analyst for radio broadcasts of Saints games for several seasons, succeeding Archie Manning, who resigned position when son Peyton entered the NFL with the Indianapolis Colts.

On January 29, 2007, he was named the head coach at Army after the resignation of Bobby Ross. During his time as head coach, the Black Knights posted a 6–18 record and lost twice to Navy by a combined score of 72–3. On December 8, 2008, Brock was fired by the USMA on December 12, 2008, after two years as head coach, and six days after the Black Knights completed their 2008 season with a 34–0 loss to archrival Navy.

=== Development and implementation of the "Brock Bone" offense ===
Following a 3–9 record in his first season as Army's head coach, Brock and his staff decided to change his offensive system from the pro set to something more similar to Navy's triple option, something Brock had once described as "a stupid idea." During spring training for the 2008 season, Brock elected to close spring practices to implement his new offense. The offense Brock developed was dubbed "the Brock Bone" by ESPN commentator Shaun King. The Brock Bone seems to employ a higher percentage of fullback dives than are ordinarily seen in a triple option offense. Coach Brock has commented, "People think that we're just calling fullback dive, but when that’s what they give you, that’s what they give you." Army ran the Brock Bone during the 2008 NCAA Division I FBS football season and finished the season ranked 110th out of 119 NCAA Division I FBS teams in total offense.

== Broadcasting career ==
On January 14, 2015, Portland, Oregon television station KOIN hired Brock as sports anchor.

== Family ==
Brock and his wife, Lori, have four daughters: Sarah, Jessica, Rachel and Emily.

== Head coaching record ==
=== College ===
Year	Team	Overall	Conference	Standing	Bowl/playoffs
Army Black Knights (NCAA Division I FBS independent) (2007–2008)
2007	Army	3–9			
2008	Army	3–9			
Army:		6–18			
Total:		6–18			
