= Vann R. Newkirk II =

American journalist and writer

- Born: Vann R. Newkirk II; December 27, 1988 (age 37); Rocky Mount, North Carolina, U.S.
- Education: Morehouse College (BS); UNC Chapel Hill (MS)
- Occupation: Journalist; writer
- Spouse: Kerone Newkirk
- Children: 1
- Awards: 2018 American Society of Magazine Editors' Next Award

Vann R. Newkirk II (born December 27, 1988) is an American journalist and staff writer for The Atlantic who writes on politics, the environment, race, and healthcare policy.

== Early life ==
Vann Newkirk grew up in Rocky Mount, North Carolina, the son of Dr. Vann Newkirk and Marylin Newkirk. He graduated from Morehouse College in 2010 and UNC Chapel Hill with a Masters of Science in Public Health in Health Policy in 2012.

== Career ==
Newkirk began his career as a policy analyst for the Kaiser Family Foundation, specializing in health policy issues.

Newkirk was inspired to begin freelancing after the shooting of Michael Brown and subsequent unrest in Ferguson, Missouri in 2014, and has been a staff writer for The Atlantic magazine since 2016. In 2018, Newkirk helped produce a special commemorative issue of the magazine on Martin Luther King Jr.'s legacy over the 50 years since King's assassination in 1968. As of 2019, Newkirk was working on a longform podcast, exploring the aftermath of Hurricane Katrina.

Newkirk has appeared as a guest on various media outlets, including The Daily Show and shows on NPR, and has been a host or keynote speaker at a number of conferences on race and identity at universities throughout the United States.

Newkirk is the host of Floodlines and Holy Week: The Story of a Revolution Undone.

Newkirk also founded and is a contributing editor to Seven Scribes, a website dedicated to promoting writers and artists of color.

== Personal life ==
Newkirk lives in Hyattsville, Maryland with his wife and family. He is an aspiring science fiction writer.
