= Inlander (newspaper) =

Newspaper in Spokane, Washington

The Inlander

- Type: Alternative weekly
- Owner(s): Ted. S. McGregor, Jr. J. Jeremy McGregor
- Editor: Chey Scott
- Founded: 1993; 33 years ago
- Headquarters: 1227 W. Summit Parkway, Spokane, Washington
- Circulation: 50,000
- Website: inlander.com

Inlander, officially The Pacific Northwest Inlander, is a free weekly newspaper published in Spokane, Washington, and circulated throughout the Inland Northwest, covering local news and culture. It is published in print and online every Thursday. A member of the Association of Alternative Newsweeklies, it was founded in 1993 by Ted S. McGregor, Jr. and J. Jeremy McGregor, who still own it. Nicholas Deshais became the paper's editor in September 2022.

== History ==
Hannelore Sudermann, for the University of Washington Magazine, wrote that Inlander's "first decade was rough. Potential advertisers turned them away, saying they wanted to wait a year or so to see if the paper survived. [...] While Ted led the editorial side of the paper, it was up to Jer to sort out the business. They all worked late into the night to meet the deadline, building the issue page-by-page. [...] In addition to selling ads, Jer taught himself to design them so he could help out the small-scale advertisers. He is the force behind the paper's broader projects and sponsorships like a regional guide called the Annual Manual and yearly events like the Inlander Music Festival, the Inlander Winter Party and the Inlander Restaurant Week".

In 2011, the Inlander moved their office space from the Civic Building to the Hutton Building in Spokane; this was the fifth office location since the newspaper was founded. The newspaper had 36 full-time employees. In 2013, the newspaper moved to a building it owns and occupies in Spokane's Kendall Yards development. S. McGregor said: "In 2010, we had sales growth of 3 percent, and we think we're poised to continue to grow". Jacob H. Fries was the paper's editor from 2012 to 2021.

In 2016, the Inlander was named one of the "10 newspapers that do it right" by media industry journal Editor & Publisher.

In May 2020, The Seattle Times reported that the Inlander had a "bad-news Zoom meeting [on] March 27 [...]. Fries had laid off copy editor Quinn Welsch and staff writer Josh Kelety the day before, which the newsroom text-message network had spread around. But there was another surprise. Fries had to cut the remaining news staff to half-time. On Zoom, they divvied up the workload, and Fries told them to use paid hours to start their underemployment claims with the Washington Economic Security Department". Two weeks later, the Inlander had received "one of the first Payroll Protection Program loans for a Washington news company: $436,500 to cover personnel costs for eight weeks". Both Welsch and Kelety were brought back on staff and continued to write for the paper.

In September 2020, The Washington Post reported that Inlander reporter Daniel Walters had received a "barrage of hateful insults" and a "threatening voice mail" from Washington state Rep. Jenny Graham after Walters "wrote a story that day about Graham sharing false articles on Facebook, including a story claiming thousands of missing children are kept in dungeons and raped by demons" and other QAnon conspiracies. In his follow-up piece, Walters fact-checked "his earlier story and including the full recording of his interview with Graham, as well as the audio from a threatening voice mail she left him. [...] Walters said he didn't write the story to shame Graham for cursing him out or posting about him on Facebook, rather to set the record straight".

Dan Nailen replaced Fries as editor in September 2021; Nicholas Deshais assumed the role in September 2022. In April 2024, Chey Scott was promoted to editor; she joined Inlander in 2012 and had been the arts and culture editor since 2022.

== Alumni ==
A number of notable journalists, writers and artists have worked at the Inlander over the past several decades, including:

- Leah Sottile, freelance journalist, essayist and podcaster
- Nick Heil, author, editor and journalist
- Jack Nisbet, author and essayist
