= Jacob H. Fries =

American journalist (born 1978)

Jacob H. Fries (born 1978) is an American journalist whose work has appeared in The New York Times, The Boston Globe, the St. Petersburg Times, The Seattle Times, and The Pacific Northwest Inlander, among other publications. His articles are usually on the topics of law and criminality. In 2006, he spent 48 hours locked up with inmates at an overcrowded county jail in Pinellas County, Florida, producing a special report for the St. Petersburg Times, which won a Green Eyeshade Award. An article he wrote on Todd Carmichael, who set a world record trekking across Antarctica, was excerpted in The Week. He was named editor of the Pacific Northwest Inlander in 2012.

He was newly announced as editor of InvestigateWest on Sept. 23, 2021.
