= Floodlines =

2020 podcast about Hurricane Katrina

- Genre: Environmental disaster; Climate change; Political podcast; History of the United States; Racism; Audio documentary
- Language: American English

Creative team
- Written by: Katy Reckdahl; Scott Stossel; William Brennan
- Creative director: Paul Spella; Ellie Budzinski; Erik Winkowski

Cast and voices
- Hosted by: Vann R. Newkirk II

Music
- Composed by: Christian Scott; Atunde Adjuah; Anthony Braxton; David Herman

Production
- Direction: Ana Carano; Melissa Depuydt; Frankie Dintino; Tolulope Edionwe; Erica Irving; Gerald Rich; John Thiel
- Production: Katherine Wells; Alvin Melathe; Kevin Townsend; Emily Gottschalk-Marconi; Kaila Philo; Myles Poydras
- Length: 30–45 minutes

Publication
- No. of seasons: 1
- No. of episodes: 8
- Original release: March 11 – March 11, 2020
- Provider: The Atlantic

Related
- Website: www.theatlantic.com/podcasts/floodlines/

Floodlines is an eight-part podcast miniseries about Hurricane Katrina hosted by Vann R. Newkirk II and produced by The Atlantic.

== Background ==
The podcast explores how the New Orleans Police Department, the Federal government of the United States, the Federal Emergency Management Agency, the United States Army Corps of Engineers, and the news media in the United States were all responsible for exacerbating the crisis. The first episode focuses on the story of Le-Ann Williams who was a fourteen-year-old girl living in the Sixth Ward of New Orleans during Hurricane Katrina. In one of the episodes Newkirk interviews Michael Brown from the Federal Emergency Management Agency. Comparisons were made by Time magazine between how the George W. Bush administration handled the hurricane to how the Donald Trump administration handled the COVID-19 pandemic.

== Production ==
Vann R. Newkirk II, Katherine Wells, and Alvin Melathe spent a year researching, writing, and producing the eight-part miniseries. The podcast is the first long-form narrative podcast produced by The Atlantic. The whole miniseries was released on March 11, 2020. Each episode is between 22 and 53 minutes long. The podcast used a mix of interviews and archival content.

== Reception ==
During an interview on Fresh Air, Nicholas Quah—a writer for Vulture and the creator of The Verge's podcast newsletter Hot Pods—commented on the show saying that "It's fantastically written, tightly composed and it sounds like a million bucks."

Wesley Morris of The New York Times commented on Newkirk's role in the audio documentary stating that he "narrates and interviews with a warm inquisitiveness and sly skepticism. People seem incapable of being anything less than honest with him." Vince Mancini—the senior film and culture writer for Uproxx—also commented on Newkirk's role, stating that he "does a wonderful job of not just telling stories from in and around Hurricane Katrina ... [but] synthesize[s] them into a fuller understanding of what actually happened".

=== Awards ===
Award	Year	Category	Result	Ref.
British Podcast Awards	2021	The International Award	Nominated	
Discover Pods Awards	2020	True Crime Podcast	Finalist	
Peabody Awards	2020	Podcast / Radio	Won	

== See also ==
- List of environmental podcasts
