= Vallow-Daybell murders =

2019 American disappearance, filicide and multiple murders case

Vallow–Daybell murders
- Location: Chandler and Gilbert, Arizona, U.S.; Rexburg, Idaho, U.S.
- Date: July–October 2019
- Target: Family members
- Attack type: Serial murder (Note: Definitions of serial murder and serial killers: Holmes & Holmes 1998, Serial murder is the killing of three or more people over a period of more than 30 days, with a significant cooling-off period between the murders. The baseline number of three victims appears to be most common among those who are the academic authorities in the field. The time frame also appears to be an agreed-upon component of the definition.; Petherick 2005, p. 190 Three killings seem to be required in the most popular definition of serial killing since they are enough to provide a pattern within the killings without being overly restrictive.; Flowers 2012, p. 195 In general, most experts on serial murder require that a minimum of three murders be committed at different times and usually different places for a person to qualify as a serial killer.; Schechter 2012, p. 73 Most experts seem to agree, however, that to qualify as a serial killer, an individual has to slay a minimum of three unrelated victims.; "Definition of Serial Murder". Federal Bureau of Investigation. (This source only requires two people)); Mariticide; Child murder / Filicide; Uxoricide; Attempted murder
- Deaths: 4
- Victims: Killed: Charles Vallow (shot); Tylee Ryan (unknown); J. J. Vallow (asphyxiated); Tammy Daybell (asphyxiated); Survived: Brandon Boudreaux (shot at)
- Perpetrators: Alex Cox (died December 12, 2019); Lori Vallow Daybell (arrested February 20, 2020); Chad Daybell (arrested June 9, 2020)
- Motive: Extramarital affair; Belief in spirit possession and an incoming apocalypse; Religious fanaticism; Insurance fraud
- Verdict: Guilty on all counts
- Convictions: First degree murder, conspiracy to commit murder, and grand theft; Chad Daybell was also convicted for insurance fraud
- In chronological order: murder of Charles Vallow, murders of Tylee Ryan and J. J. Vallow, attempted murder of Brandon Boudreaux, murder of Tammy Daybell

The Vallow–Daybell murders were a series of killings – including child murder, filicide, and spousal murder – committed by American couple Lori Vallow Daybell and Chad Daybell. (Note: For consistency, and to differentiate, this article refers to Chad Daybell and Lori Vallow, who have been husband and wife since November 2019, as well as their previous spouses Tammy Daybell and Charles Vallow, by their given names.) Chad and Lori led a small, apocalyptic religious group that was described in the media as a doomsday cult. Media coverage initially focused on the pair's religious beliefs, but investigations revealed that the murders also had a financial motive. Ultimately, Chad, Lori, and Lori's brother, Alex Cox, (Note: In late 2019, two weeks before his death, Cox married Zulema Pastenes in Clark County, Nevada, and according to their marriage certificate changed his legal name upon marriage from Alexander Lamar Cox to Alexander Lamar Pastenes.) killed four people and attempted to kill another.

At the time of the murders, Chad and Lori were members of the Church of Jesus Christ of Latter-day Saints. However, their beliefs had deviated significantly from mainstream Mormonism. Chad, an apocalyptic author and publisher, claimed to have visions of the future and prophesied that the world would end in July 2020. Lori, dubbed "Doomsday Mom" in later media coverage, adopted his fringe beliefs; she became convinced that she was a deity destined to play a role in the coming apocalypse and that her family was obstructing her mission.

The killings began in July 2019, when Cox shot Lori's estranged husband, Charles Vallow. Lori's daughter Tylee Ryan and adopted son J.J. Vallow were last seen alive in September 2019, near their home in Rexburg, Idaho. Their remains were found on June 9, 2020, on a property owned by Chad. In October 2019, Lori's nephew-in-law Brandon Boudreaux survived a murder attempt, just weeks before Chad's wife, Tammy, was murdered at their Rexburg home. Lori and Chad married two weeks after her death.

The case was set in motion by the children's disappearances. In late November 2019, after police questioned Lori about J.J.'s whereabouts, she and Chad abruptly vacated their homes in Idaho and left for Hawaii. As police searched for J.J., they discovered that Tylee was also missing. A connection was then made between the children's disappearance, the deaths of Charles and Tammy, and the murder attempt on Brandon Boudreaux. On February 20, 2020, Lori was arrested for desertion and non-support of her children. The discovery of their remains on June 9 the same year led to Chad's arrest. Cox, who the authorities believe to have participated in all crimes, died before he could be arrested. On May 25, 2021, Chad and Lori were charged with the first-degree murders of Tylee, J.J., and Tammy. Prosecutors said that the couple had conspired with Cox to commit the murders in part due to their apocalyptic beliefs, but also to remove obstacles to their affair and to collect life insurance money and the children's Social Security benefits.

Lori and Chad were tried separately. Lori was found guilty of all charges related to the killings of Tylee, J.J., and Tammy, and given multiple life sentences without the possibility of parole. Chad was also found guilty of all charges and sentenced to death. After her sentencing in Idaho, Lori was extradited to Arizona to stand trial there twice, for the murder and attempted murder of Charles Vallow and Brandon Boudreaux, respectively. She was again found guilty and given two additional life sentences. Both Chad and Lori have appealed their sentencings.

== Background ==
=== Chad Daybell ===
Chad Daybell
- Daybell's 2020 mugshot
- Born: Chad Guy Daybell; August 11, 1968 (age 58); Provo, Utah, U.S.
- Other names: "Doomsday Dad" "Doomsday Prophet"
- Occupations: author, publisher
- Spouses: Tamara Douglas (m. 1990; murdered 2019) Lori Vallow (m. 2019)
- Children: 5
- Convictions: First degree murder (3 counts); Conspiracy to commit murder (3 counts); Grand theft (2 counts); Insurance fraud (1 count)
- Penalty: Death

Details
- Date apprehended: June 9, 2020; 6 years ago

Chad Daybell was born on August 11, 1968, in Provo, Utah, to a Mormon family and grew up in the neighboring city of Springville. He was accepted and enrolled at Brigham Young University (BYU) after high school. One year into college, he applied to be a missionary, for which he spent two years in New Jersey. He then resumed his studies and graduated from BYU with a B.A. in journalism. Chad married Tamara "Tammy" Douglas on March 9, 1990; they had five children.

Chad worked for a time as a copy editor for the Ogden Standard-Examiner. At various times during and after his studies, he supported himself by working as a gravedigger, then as the cemetery sexton for Springville.

Chad's first religion-themed novel, An Errand for Emma, was published in 1999 by the Springville-based publisher Cedar Fort, Inc. He eventually left his employment at the cemetery to write full time. In 2001, he published One Foot in the Grave, a non-fiction book that chronicled his experiences working in cemeteries. In 2004, Chad and his wife founded Spring Creek Book Company, which he used to publish his beliefs regarding the end times as well as other books aimed at a Mormon audience.

By the end of the 2000s, the Daybells's publishing business was in difficulty. Both spouses had to work part-time jobs with Chad being employed again as a cemetery sexton. Eventually, Chad found an audience among people concerned by the Second Coming of Jesus, and became a popular author and speaker in some radical Mormon circles. He published dozens of fiction and non-fiction books, by himself or other authors.

Chad's novels often depicted apocalyptic situations and dystopian futures, and featured characters based on his own family. In a memoir called Living on the Edge of Heaven, he claimed to have had two near-death experiences that allowed him to receive supernatural visions from "beyond the veil". A recurring theme in Chad's writings was a supernatural voice giving instructions and advice to him or to his characters. He commented: "I don't fictionalize any of the events portrayed [in my books]. I'm really not that creative... My torn veil allows information to be downloaded into my brain from the other side. The scenes I am shown are real events that will happen". Chad was also a regular contributor to "Another Voice of Warning" (AVOW), a Mormon paid forum where he would discuss his near-death experiences and thoughts on the future. Over time, Chad's religious beliefs became increasingly extreme. In 2013, he began prophesying there would be earthquakes, war, and destruction in the Americas.

During the 2010s, Chad became the publisher of apocalyptic author and self-proclaimed clairvoyant Julie Rowe, who made prophecies and claims of connections to the "spirit world" similar to his own. Both were popular among Mormon "preppers" who believed the end of the world to be imminent and considered regrouping in tent cities to await doomsday.

In 2015, Chad claimed he heard the "voice" telling him to relocate to Rexburg, Idaho. He and Tammy moved there from Springville that June. Chad said that he had had a vision that Utah would be devastated by an earthquake in 2015.

=== Lori Vallow Daybell ===
Lori Vallow Daybell
- Vallow Daybell's 2020 mugshot
- Born: Lori Norene Cox; June 26, 1973 (age 53); Loma Linda, California, U.S.
- Other names: Lori Norene Ryan; Lori Norene Vallow; Lori Ryan Vallow; Lori Ryan Daybell; Lori Norene Daybell; Lori Ryan Vallow Daybell "Doomsday Mom" "Cult Mom"
- Spouses: 5, including: Joseph Anthony Ryan Jr. (m. 2001; div. 2005) Leland Charles Anthony Vallow (m. 2006; murdered 2019) Chad Guy Daybell (m. 2019)
- Children: Colby Ryan; Tylee Ryan; Joshua Jaxon "J.J." Vallow
- Convictions: First degree murder (2 counts); Conspiracy to commit murder (5 counts); Grand theft (2 counts)
- Penalty: 5 consecutive life sentences (3 with no possibility of parole and 2 with the possibility of parole after 25 years)

Details
- Date apprehended: February 20, 2020; 6 years ago

Lori Ryan Daybell, (Note: Daybell, born Lori Norene Cox, has been known by a variety of legal names. She is referred to as both Lori Norene Vallow and Lori Norene Daybell in court filings. She has commonly been referred to as Lori Vallow Daybell in the media during the investigation. Daybell's attorney submitted a court motion in March 2021 that her legal name is Lori Norene Ryan Vallow Daybell. Included in the motion was Lori and Chad Daybell's marriage certificate from Hawaii, which states her new legal name as Lori Ryan Daybell.) also referred to as Lori Vallow Daybell, was born Lori Cox on June 26, 1973, in Loma Linda, California. She grew up in a Mormon family. Her parents were tax protesters who adhered to sovereign citizen ideology and were in a conflict with the IRS for about two decades. In 1992, at the age of 19, Lori married her high school boyfriend, but the marriage ended in divorce shortly afterwards. In October 1995, Lori married again and had a son named Colby in 1996, before divorcing in 1998. She worked for some time as a hairdresser. In 2004, she was a contestant in both the Mrs. Texas beauty pageant and on the game show Wheel of Fortune.

In 2001, Lori married Joseph Anthony Ryan Jr., who gave his name to Colby. The couple's daughter, Tylee, was born in 2002. Lori and Ryan divorced in 2005, subsequently engaging in a bitter custody battle during which she accused him of sexually assaulting both children. Ryan eventually lost equal custody. Lori's brother Alex Cox attacked Ryan in 2007, claiming he had been abusive to Lori and the children; Cox served ninety days in jail for the incident. In 2020, Colby claimed during an interview that as a child, he had been sexually abused by Ryan.

In 2018, Ryan was found dead in his apartment from what was determined to be arteriosclerotic cardiovascular disease. After Lori's arrest in 2020, and after a recording surfaced in which she mentioned wanting to kill Ryan "like Nephi killed", police reviewed Ryan's death. Nothing was found to suspect foul play.

In February 2006, Lori married Leland Charles Anthony Vallow, who commonly went by the name Charles. In 2013 the couple adopted Charles' grandnephew, Joshua Jaxon "J.J." Vallow, as the boy's birth parents were unable to care for him. Because of his biological parents' substance abuse, J.J. was born with drugs in his system and spent time in the neonatal intensive care unit. As a baby, he was taken care of for nearly a year by his grandparents, Kay (Charles' sister) and Larry Woodcock, before being adopted by Charles. J.J. was eventually diagnosed with autism.

=== Vallow and Daybell meet ===
Around 2015, Lori became interested in Chad Daybell's Standing in Holy Places series of books. Over the next few years she became increasingly invested in radical religious beliefs, reading books about near-death experiences and listening to podcasts by excommunicated Mormons.

In October 2018, together with Melanie Gibb and Zulema Pastenes, whom she had recently befriended, Lori attended a "Preparing a People" (Note: Preparing a People is a doomsday preparation-focused series of events organized by a Mormon multimedia company called Color My Media. The stated goal of these events is to "prepare the people of this earth for the Second Coming of Jesus Christ". Chad Daybell, a keynote speaker for the event, gave lectures for the group on several occasions) event where she met Chad for the first time. Gibb and Pastenes both said that Lori had behaved in a very flirtatious manner with Chad at the conference. Chad claimed to Lori that they had been married in multiple previous lifetimes. They started communicating privately afterwards.

After their initial meeting, Lori's husband went on a business trip, giving her the opportunity to hold a small overnight gathering at her home. Chad and Gibb were among the attendees, with Chad captivating Lori and the group by sharing his unique, Mormon-influenced, beliefs. Lori developed a strong attachment to Chad and his teachings. The two eventually became lovers.

On December 5, 2018, Chad and Lori appeared together on the Preparing a People podcast episode "Time to Warrior Up". The two were featured in several other episodes.

A religious group formed around Chad and his teachings. He and Lori told their followers that they belonged to the "Church of the Firstborn," (Note: The phrase "Church of the Firstborn" is used in the Doctrine and Covenants to refer to the people sealed up in the end times. It has since been used as the name of various Mormon groups, some of them splinters from the LDS Church.) of which Chad was the leader. The group included Lori's niece, Melani Boudreaux; (Note: Melani was born Melani Cope. She later changed her name to Melani Boudreaux during her marriage to her first husband, Brandon Boudreaux. After marrying her second husband, she changed her name to Melani Pawlowski.) Gibb; Cox; and Pastenes, who eventually became Cox's girlfriend and then wife. Gibb and Lori co-hosted a podcast called "Feel the Fire".

=== Lori and Chad's beliefs ===
Reincarnation – a concept which is not accepted by the LDS Church – played a key part in Chad's religious views. He claimed to have lived thirty-one previous lives on different planets and that Lori had lived twenty-one separate lives, five of which coincided with his own experiences on Earth. Lori eventually told Gibb that she and Chad were sealed due to their previous marriages in their past lives, despite their respective spouses still being alive. When Gibb suggested that Chad and Lori should divorce their spouses, Lori told her they were "not allowed to" because of information they were receiving "from the other side of the veil".

Chad also claimed to be a reincarnation of James the Less, that Lori had been James' wife under the name "Elena" and that in other past lives Lori had been Mary French, the great-grandmother of Joseph Smith, as well as the wife of the prophet Moroni. According to Chad, past lives were "multiple probations" on Earth. This belief is shared by some Mormon fundamentalist groups who consider that such "probations" are necessary for one to reach exaltation.

Chad categorized people as "light" or "dark" based on his assigning them an affiliation with Jesus Christ or Satan. He and Lori employed a unique "scoring system" for good and evil, assigning every person a rating from "light" to "dark." According to their belief system, "dark" people were possessed by evil spirits. The group often joined in "castings," ceremonies where they would try to cast away evil spirits through prayers and scripture readings. They claimed that in some cases "possessed" people could become "zombies," and that the only way to banish a zombie was to kill the person. Seven women within the group, including Lori and Zulema Pastenes, called themselves the "seven gatherers" and would do "castings" together, sometimes via Zoom.

Chad and Lori also scored people on a "vibration" scale, and deemed those having enough "vibrations" to possess special powers, or to be translated. Their beliefs also included teleportation and "dark and light portals." Chad claimed that he could create such supernatural "portals" which he used to "interact spiritually" with Lori, receive revelations, and travel to other realms.

Chad predicted that the world would come to an end on July 22, 2020. He told his followers that he was guided by angels and could see hidden truths, while Lori claimed to have direct communications with God and Jesus. Lori came to believe that she was an "exalted goddess" with visionary powers, and that she and Chad were destined to lead the 144,000 people who would survive when the world ended. Zulema Pastenes later told investigators that Lori believed that, as an exalted being, she couldn't be held responsible for her actions on Earth.

Lindsay Park, executive director of the Sunstone Education Foundation, commented that these beliefs could be categorized as Mormon fundamentalism (though without the polygamy aspects) or "Mormon fanfic," as they took the fundamental tenets of the LDS Church and rewrote them to the extreme. Journalist Leah Sottile, who wrote When the Moon Turns to Blood about the case, said that Chad and Lori had been active "at the fringes, the far right fringes of the Church of Jesus Christ of Latter-day Saints," and were able to meet due to an "ecosystem of extremism" that exists in those circles.

== Murder of Charles Vallow ==
Charles Vallow, killed July 11, 2019.

By February 2019, Lori reportedly informed Charles that "she no longer cared about him or J.J." She then vanished for 58 days. The same month, Charles filed for divorce, citing threats to his life, as well as the theft of his truck and US$35,000 from their joint bank accounts. According to Charles' filing, Lori had told him that he was possessed by a "dark spirit" called "Ned Schneider," that she was "a god assigned to carry out the work of the 144,000 at Christ's Second Coming" which would happen in July 2020, and that she would murder him if he got in the way of her mission.

Charles sought a protective order against Lori at the advice of his attorney. He withdrew the petition one month later, saying he wanted to "try to make the marriage work." Nevertheless, Charles had become so worried by Lori's behavior that in February 2019, he changed his $1 million life insurance policy so the beneficiary would be his sister Kay rather than his wife. Lori was unaware of this until after Charles' death.

Arizona police detectives later retrieved text messages between Chad, Lori and her brother Alex Cox which referred to Charles as "Ned" or "Hiplos", the names of the "spirit" said to possess him. Lori told members of her religious group that her husband had become a "zombie." Several followers repeatedly joined to pray for Charles' demise.

Having discovered his wife's affair with Chad Daybell, Charles Vallow confronted Lori about it. Eleven days before his death, he sent an email to Tammy Daybell to inform her that their spouses were cheating. Evidence later showed that Tammy had opened and deleted the message, and blocked Charles' email address. On July 1, 2019, Charles informed Lori that he planned to meet Tammy in person. At that point, Lori and Chad were communicating constantly with burner phones.

On July 11, 2019, Charles went to pick up J.J. at Lori's home in Chandler, Arizona early in the morning. Alex Cox was present. An altercation occurred, and Cox shot and killed Charles. Tylee told police that she had grabbed a baseball bat after she heard from her room Charles, Lori and Cox arguing, that Charles had taken the bat away from her, and that she had then run away from the house with J.J. before the shooting. Cox claimed self-defense, alleging that he had retrieved his gun after Charles struck him on the head with the bat. Lori did not call 911; it was later determined that Alex Cox had called it about 45 minutes after Charles was killed. Moments after the shooting, Lori took J.J. to school and stopped on her way at Burger King, then at Walgreens to buy flip-flops.

No charges were pressed. A police detective later testified that Lori's behavior that day had been oddly "nonchalant" and that she seemed unaffected by the situation. Zulema Pastenes said that Cox had told her he did not feel bad because he had killed a "zombie." Investigations later showed that, two days before the shooting, Lori had sent her brother a text message which told him to "be like Nephi": police interpreted that message as a command to kill a wicked man.

Lori texted Charles' sons from a previous marriage that their father had "passed away," then left them without any further information for three days. Charles' sons had to find on their own the mortuary where their father's body was. They were left to organise a memorial service, which Lori did not attend.

Before Charles' death, his attorneys stated he had been primarily concerned for J.J.'s safety and well-being, as the boy needed a consistent routine due to his special needs. Charles was also concerned for Tylee, but he was unable to include her in the filings as she was neither his biological daughter nor had he filed to legally adopt her.

Days after Charles was killed, Chad sent Lori a love story in the form of a series of text messages. The story, which investigators called a "romance novel," told the meeting of "James" and "Elena" – the names Chad substituted for himself and Lori – and gave a detailed description of their sexual relationship.

== Disappearances of Tylee and J.J. ==
Tylee Ryan, disappeared September 9, 2019 (aged 16) (Note: Tylee was last seen September 8, 2019, at Yellowstone National Park. Authorities believe Tylee died around September 9, 2019, in Rexburg, based on location data on the cell phone of her uncle Alex Cox.)

Joshua Jaxon "J. J." Vallow, disappeared September 23, 2019 (aged 7) (Note: J.J. was last seen on the evening of September 22, 2019, at his mother Lori Vallow Daybell's Rexburg home. The next day, Lori told friends that J.J.'s uncle Alex Cox had taken the boy to his apartment. Authorities believe J.J. died around that time frame based on location data on the cell phone of his uncle.)

By the end of August, Lori relocated to Rexburg, Idaho with her children. Alex Cox also moved there. Just before moving to Idaho, Lori sold J.J.'s service dog.

While Lori and her children resided in Rexburg, neighbors noticed J.J.'s erratic behavior as Lori often left him outside without adult supervision for long periods of time. When confronted about this, Lori did not mention that J.J. was autistic but told neighbors that he was "her niece's drug baby."

Tylee was last seen on September 8, 2019, at Yellowstone National Park with her brother J.J., her mother Lori, and her uncle Alex Cox. She was never enrolled at any school in Idaho, even though her mother had claimed she was attending BYU-Idaho.

J.J. last attended Rexburg's Kennedy Elementary School on September 20. On September 22, Melanie Gibb and her boyfriend, David Warwick, were staying at Lori's home. Around 10:30 p.m, Warwick saw Alex Cox take J.J., who was sleeping, upstairs to his bedroom. This was J.J.'s last confirmed sighting. On the next morning, J.J. was absent; Lori told Gibb and Warwick that J.J. had been misbehaving so his uncle Alex had picked him up.

On September 23, J.J. had an unexcused absence from school. The next day, Lori informed Rexburg Elementary School that she would now be homeschooling J.J. In the months that followed her children's disappearances, Lori kept collecting the Social Security Survivor benefits that each received after the death of their respective father.

In October 2019, two Venmo payments were made from Tylee's account to her older half-brother, Colby Ryan, with love-expressing messages attached. When Colby later expressed concern towards Tylee via text, he received responses from her cell phone indicating she was safe but too busy to talk. After repeated calls to Tylee went unanswered, Colby became more worried.

Brandon Boudreaux and Melanie Gibb later said that Lori and Chad were convinced Tylee and J.J. were "possessed" and had become "zombies." Zulema Pastenes testified that Chad had told his followers that J.J. would die soon, only to come back as Colby's son.

The FBI uncovered text messages in which Lori and Chad discussed Tylee and J.J.'s "possession" and mentioned "a perfectly orchestrated plan to take the children." A text exchange between Lori and Alex Cox mentioned "working on Z's," referring to zombies.

== Attempted murder of Brandon Boudreaux ==
On October 2, 2019, Brandon Boudreaux, the estranged husband of Lori's niece Melani, was shot at from a Jeep while driving home in Gilbert, Arizona. The bullet missed Boudreaux's head by inches. Boudreaux, who had been close to Charles and Lori Vallow's family, recognized the Jeep as a vehicle used by Tylee Ryan. The Jeep drove away, but Boudreaux could give its license plate number to the police who identified it as being registered to Charles Vallow.

Melani had become very involved with her aunt's religious activities during 2018 and had insisted that she and her husband buy food stockpiles for the end of the world. During the summer of 2019, she had demanded a divorce, which was not yet finalized when Boudreaux was shot at. Boudreaux said that he had been blindsided by the divorce request, which he blamed on Melani's involvement in her aunt's "cult."

Boudreaux, who suspected Lori and her brother Alex of Charles' killing, hired a private investigator. After it became known that Tylee and J.J. were missing, Boudreaux was convinced that Charles' death, the children's disappearance, and the attempt on his life were all connected to Lori's religious group. He suspected that the murder attempt against him was motivated by his life insurance policy. Prosecutors later opined that Lori had hoped to access Boudreaux's money through her niece.

In February 2020, Boudreaux filed a court document claiming that the attempt on his life was motivated by insurance money, that the gunman was probably Lori's recently deceased brother Alex Cox, and that Melani was likely aware of Tylee and J.J.'s whereabouts. Melani denied any knowledge of what had happened to the children.

By tracking Alex Cox's cell phone data, investigators later found that Cox had searched on the Internet for directions to Boudreaux's address and had been present near Boudreaux's home during the hours before the shooting. He had also searched "how to load ammunition", "ballistic trajectory calculators" and, after the shooting, "man shot in Gilbert." On the day of the shooting, Cox and Lori had communicated several times. Later on, Lori had also made Internet searches about a shooting in Gilbert, Arizona.

== Murder of Tammy Daybell ==
Tammy Daybell, killed October 19, 2019.

In February 2019, Chad told his neighbors, Todd and Alice Gilbert, that he had had a vision that Tammy would die before her 50th birthday.

On October 9, 2019, Tammy reported being shot at in her driveway by a masked man with what she thought was a paintball gun. The man pulled the trigger several times, but the gun was apparently unloaded. Police believed this to be a prank but could not identify the man.

Ten days later, Tammy was found dead in her home, apparently from natural causes. Chad claimed that she had retired the previous night "with a terrible cough" and died in her sleep. He said that Tammy had been experiencing low blood pressure, seizures, and negative reactions with homeopathic medicines, though nothing in her medical records supported this.

Tammy's funeral was organized in Utah three days after her death. Alice Gilbert later said she had been surprised that the funeral came so soon, and felt like it had been "planned." The Gilberts also testified that, unlike his children, Chad did not seem devastated and had acted in a "businesslike" manner. Chad's sister-in-law, Heather Daybell, said that Chad's behavior at Tammy's funeral did not ring true and that he "just didn't seem upset". Jason Gwilliam, the husband of Tammy's sister, said that he felt Chad was "not crying but trying to cry." During the service, Chad mentioned in his talk that Tammy suffered from depression, commented that she was not easy to live with and called her "lazy."

According to police reports, Chad Daybell received life insurance payouts after Tammy's death totaling US$430,000 (equivalent to about $541,000 in 2025).

Tammy's body was not autopsied initially due to Chad's refusal and the coroner's acceptance of his decision. However, after Tammy's body was exhumed and autopsied, it was determined that she had been asphyxiated by someone else. The autopsy results, completed by February 2021, were not publicly revealed until April 2023, during Lori's trial.

Investigators later uncovered text messages between Chad and Lori, claiming that Tammy was in "limbo" and possessed by a spirit named "Viola." At some point, Chad and Lori told their followers that Tammy had become a "zombie."

Alex Cox's phone was located near the Daybells' residence on October 9, four hours before Tammy was shot at. It pinged again in the same area ten days later, on the night Tammy died. Police found at Cox's home an AR-15 that resembled the description Tammy had made of the supposed paintball gun. Cox had made several Internet searches about the use of an AR-15 and on how a Grendel round would impact a Dodge Dakota, which was the car the Daybells owned. Prosecutors later said the "paintball gun" spotted by Tammy on October 9 was a real gun, that may have jammed or misfired, and that the shooter was probably Alex Cox. Zulema Pastenes testified that she had been with Lori and her niece Melani to do a "casting" on the night Tammy was attacked in her driveway. At some point during that night, Lori talked with someone on the phone and became very angry, calling the other person "idiot, moron, stupid." After hanging up, she commented: "idiot can't do anything by himself."

== Chad Daybell and Lori Vallow’s marriage and flight ==
Chad introduced Lori to his children the day after Tammy's funeral. One week after Tammy's death, he also told Todd and Alice Gilbert that he had found the woman he would marry. Days later, Chad brought Lori to meet the Gilberts. Alice Gilbert described the situation as "awkward," with Chad and Lori laughing and giggling, and being very affectionate to each other, more than Gilbert had seen Chad be with Tammy. Chad also mentioned that Lori "recently had a daughter who had passed away."

Chad told Tammy's sister, Samantha Gwilliam, that Tammy's spirit had appeared to him at the cemetery and advised him to "move on." He also told Samantha that he and Lori had bonded over their recently dead spouses and that Lori had no children, so they would be "empty nesters."

Chad and Lori were married in Hawaii on November 5, 2019, two weeks after the death of Tammy, and two months after Tylee and J.J. (not yet known to be missing) were murdered. Apart from his children, Chad did not inform his family beforehand. Chad's mother discovered that he and Lori were married upon meeting Lori.

Investigators later found in Lori's internet history that she had ordered a pair of wedding rings in August 2019, several months before Tammy's death, and that she had searched for wedding dresses on the day of Tammy's burial.

On November 26, police visited Lori's townhouse in Rexburg for a welfare check on J.J. at the request of his grandmother, Kay Woodcock. A police detective initially found Chad and Alex Cox at Lori's home. Both men acted suspiciously, with Alex Cox (not knowing that it was Kay who had requested the welfare check) claiming that J.J. was with his grandmother and Chad (whom the detective knew was married to Lori) saying that he was a friend of Alex and that he "hardly knew" Lori. Police later reached Lori, who claimed that J.J. was in Arizona with her friend Melanie Gibb. However, when contacted by police, Gibb stated that J.J. had not been with her for several months. That night, a neighbor observed Lori and Alex Cox packing a truck outside her home. The following day, when the police and FBI arrived to search the house, it was abandoned. Chad's home was also searched by investigators.

Lori and Chad returned to Hawaii, where they resided in a gated community in Princeville on the island of Kauai, living off the money Chad had received from Tammy's life insurance. While searching for a home in Hawaii, Chad had written in an application that the couple had no children.

== Investigations and media coverage ==
Prosecutors in Idaho became involved in the case when police requested a warrant for locating the Jeep from which Brandon Boudreaux had been shot at in Arizona. On December 6, 2019, Melanie Gibb contacted the police, revealing that both Lori and Chad had called her separately on November 26 and had asked her to tell police that J.J. was with her. Police efforts to locate J.J. led to the discovery that Tylee was also missing, and a connection was made between the investigations in Idaho and those in Arizona. Law enforcement agencies intensified their inquiries about the children's whereabouts, as well as Chad and Lori's departure from Idaho. It was also decided to further investigate Tammy's death: her body was exhumed for an autopsy on December 11.

On December 20, the Rexburg Police Department announced that the children were officially missing and asked the public's assistance in locating them. Investigators expressed concern for the children's safety, asserting that they were not with Chad and Lori and that Lori had refused to cooperate with the investigation, opting to leave the state with Chad instead. Police also announced that the children's disappearance could be linked to Tammy Daybell's "suspicious death". The next day, police said Lori and Chad were "persons of interest."

The case soon received national coverage, with family and friends describing Chad and Lori's "cult-like" beliefs in interviews and on social media posts. On December 23, 2019, the Daybells released statements through a Rexburg attorney, who said that "Chad Daybell was a loving husband and he has the support of his children in this matter," adding that Lori was a "devoted mother" who "resents assertions to the contrary" and that the "allegations" would be addressed "once they have moved beyond speculation and rumor."

Colby Ryan, J.J.'s grandparents Larry and Kay Woodcock, and Chad's brother, Matt Daybell, issued messages asking Lori and Chad to return the children. On January 7, 2020, the Woodcocks held a press conference in Rexburg offering a $20,000 reward for the children's return or for any information leading to them.

On January 25, 2020, after Lori and Chad were located in Kauai, law enforcement agents served them with a court order requiring Lori to "physically produce" within five days Tylee and J.J. to the Idaho Department of Welfare or to the Rexburg Police Department. The next day, police seized the couple's rental car and searched their rental townhome in Princeville, where they found Tylee's debit card and J.J.'s iPad. Also on January 26, the Daybells were confronted over the children's disappearance by East Idaho News reporter Nate Eaton; they refused to answer questions.

In February 2020, investigators focused on a storage locker in Rexburg that had been rented by Lori in October 2019. They discovered belongings linked to Tylee and J.J., including clothing, bikes, and photographs. These items had been left behind when Lori abruptly left Rexburg in late November 2019. Video footage captured Lori and Alex Cox moving items to and from the locker before her departure.

== Death of Alex Cox ==
On November 24, 2019, Chad Daybell gave Alex Cox a "patriarchal blessing," which he had no standing to give in the LDS Church, saying that Alex had assisted him and Lori "in ways that can never be repaid." Chad called Alex a prophet and a hero and predicted he would have a future as a "messenger of the Lord." The recording of this "blessing" was later found by investigators on Lori's iCloud account.

Alex Cox died on December 12, 2019. His death was attributed to blood clots and high blood pressure.

The day before his death, Cox had been informed by Lori and Chad that Tammy Daybell's body was going to be exhumed. Zulema Pastenes later testified that Cox had told her he was worried about being Lori and Chad's "fall guy."

== Arrests and criminal charges ==
=== Lori's arrest ===
On February 20, 2020, Lori was arrested in Hawaii by the Kauai Police Department. On March 5, she was extradited back to Idaho.

Lori faced charges in Madison County, Idaho, including two felony counts of desertion and nonsupport of dependent children, as well as three misdemeanors. Her bail was initially set at $5 million, but was later lowered to $1 million after her extradition to Idaho. In May, Lori appeared in court in Rexburg to request a further reduction of her bail, which was denied. Multiple local bond companies were reportedly unwilling to work with her.

After Lori's arrest, Chad returned to Idaho. He tried to convince the Gilberts to put their home up for bond to get Lori out of prison, claiming that Jesus had given him this idea. When Alice Gilbert asked him about the children and confronted him on what he had said about Lori's daughter being dead, Chad answered that it was a custody issue. He added at some point that Tylee "didn't like people" and did not like him, using the past tense.

=== Discovery of the children's remains and Chad's arrest ===
On June 9, police found human remains buried in unmarked graves in the backyard of Chad's home during a search of the premises. Tylee's remains were located in an area the Daybell family called the pet cemetery, as it had been used to bury their cats and dogs. J.J.'s remains were located in a separate area of the property near a pond. As the property was being searched, Chad phoned Lori in jail to warn her about the situation. After police found and began to unearth the bodies, he tried to drive off from the scene, but was chased down and apprehended. He was arrested for obstruction or concealment of evidence. The next day, his bail was set at $1 million.

Authorities had decided to search Daybell's property after tracking Alex Cox's cell phone. On September 9, 2019, the day after Tylee's last verifiable sighting, Cox's phone had pinged in the middle of the night at Lori's home, then in the morning at Daybell's home. In the morning of September 23, the day after J.J. was last seen, Cox's phone had again pinged at Daybell's property. The FBI also intercepted a September 9 text conversation between Chad Daybell and his wife, in which Chad told Tammy he had shot a large raccoon after finding it in their backyard that morning, and buried it in their "pet cemetery." Investigators found that suspicious, as raccoons are normally nocturnal animals.

On June 10, the Woodcock and Ryan families confirmed that the human remains found on Chad's property were those of Tylee and J.J. This finding was officially confirmed by Rexburg police three days later. Tylee's body was burned, her hands had been cut off, and her bones were fractured in several places, from which forensic examiners deduced that someone had attempted to dismember her. J.J.'s body was wrapped in plastic. Unlike Tylee, he had been buried with great care, under rocks and wooden planks.

It was determined that J.J. had been asphyxiated with a plastic bag and duct tape over his mouth. Due to the state of her remains, Tylee's cause of death could not be determined and was ruled a "homicide by unspecified means. Tylee's DNA was found on a pickaxe and a shovel seized at Chad's home. Alex Cox's fingerprints and Lori's hair were found on the plastic and duct tape on J.J.'s remains.

In August, Chad Daybell was excommunicated by the Church of Jesus Christ of Latter-day Saints on the basis of his religious teachings, which the media later described as a "doomsday cult."

=== Charges ===
On July 2, 2020, prosecutors dropped two charges against Lori related to desertion and nonsupport of dependent children, and instead charged her with obstruction or concealment of evidence regarding her children's remains.

On July 17, in light of the two felony counts against Lori having been dropped, her bond was lowered by Madison County judge Michelle Mallard. The bond was set at $50,000 for each charge, totaling $150,000. It was further noted that Chad would still need to post $1 million in Fremont County to be released from jail.

On May 25, 2021, Chad and Lori were indicted on charges of conspiracy to commit first-degree murder for the deaths of Tylee, J.J. and Tammy, as well as grand theft by deception regarding the children. Lori was also charged with grand theft related to her children's Social Security Survivor benefits. Chad faced an insurance fraud charge related to Tammy's life insurance policy.

In June 2021, Lori was indicted by a grand jury in Maricopa County, Arizona, on one count of conspiracy to commit first-degree murder for the death of Charles Vallow. Police documents read:

the evidence shows that Charles' death was a planned event and necessary to prevent Charles and others from confronting Lori about her extreme religious beliefs when he came to town... The death of Charles Vallow was also necessary in order for Chad Daybell and Lori Vallow to marry and fulfill their religious prophecy.

In July 2021, prosecutors in Maricopa County decided not to prosecute Chad Daybell in connection with the death of Charles Vallow, citing "no reasonable likelihood of conviction."

In September 2021, Chad Daybell's children issued a statement defending their father's innocence and claiming he had been "fooled in the worst, most deadly way possible" by Lori Vallow.

In 2022, Lori was indicted by a grand jury on one count of first-degree premeditated murder related to the attempt on Brandon Boudreaux's life.

== Trials ==
=== Lori and Chad's trials in Idaho ===
A jury trial for the Madison County charges against Lori was initially set for January 25–29, 2021. On May 27, 2021, Lori was found incompetent and unfit to stand trial, and her case was stayed. In December 2021, Lori's attorney Mark Means was disqualified from the case because his representation of both Lori and Chad created a conflict. On April 11, 2022, Lori was deemed competent to stand trial after mental health treatment. On October 6, 2022, after Lori's new defense team filed several motions, Judge Steven W. Boyce issued an order indicating the case was suspended until her competency to stand trial could be determined. On November 16, she was once again found competent.

Lori and Chad both pleaded not guilty to all charges in Idaho. Their cases were split in March 2023, at Chad's request. The reasons were that Chad had waived his right to a speedy trial and his attorneys said they needed more time to review DNA evidence. Chad's attorneys also cited the "mutually antagonistic nature of the defendants' positions". Since Lori had not waived her right to a swift trial, the court ruled that her case would proceed as planned.

==== Lori (2023) ====
On March 21, 2023, the judge removed the possibility of the death penalty from Lori's trial due to newly uncovered DNA evidence, discovered too close to the trial to be tested and admitted into court.

Lori's trial began on April 3, 2023, in the Ada County Courthouse in Boise, Idaho. She did not testify in her own defense. Her lawyers did not call any witnesses, while the prosecution called about 60 people to testify. On April 15, pictures of the children's corpses were shown to jurors and audience. Lori asked to be excused from court that day; this was denied, as the defendant in a felony case must be present at all significant proceedings.

Melanie Gibb, Audrey Barattiero (another former friend of Lori's who had also participated in her religious group) and Ian Pawlowski (the husband of Lori's niece Melani) testified about Lori's beliefs and her claims that she could cast out Satan and other evil spirits. Barattiero said that when she grew uncomfortable about Lori's beliefs and decided to dissolve their friendship, Lori threatened to murder her and dispose of her body in trash bags.

In the light of the evidence that pointed to Alex Cox's direct involvement in the murders, prosecutors stated that Lori Vallow Daybell had "groomed" and "manipulated" her brother to participate in her crimes. Lori's sister Summer Shiflet testified that Alex had suffered brain damage in a car accident and that his decision-making was "stuck at a teenage level." Zulema Pastenes said that Alex was entirely under the influence of Chad and Lori, who had convinced him that he was a reincarnated warrior of God and that "the only reason he had come to Earth was to protect Lori."

During the closing arguments, Lori's attorney Jim Archibald depicted her as being under Chad Daybell's psychological control. Prosecutor Rob Wood summed up the evidence that showed Lori had participated in the conspiracy to commit all three murders and reminded the jury how Lori had never reported that her children were missing and had lied to multiple people about their whereabouts.

On May 12, 2023, Lori was found guilty of all criminal charges. On July 31, 2023, she received three consecutive life sentences without the possibility of parole for, respectively, the murder of Tylee, the murder of J.J., and the conspiracy to murder Tammy, in addition to fines and restitution for the grand theft charges.

Judge Boyce said that Lori had murdered her children to "remove them as obstacles and to profit financially," by choosing "the most evil and destructive path possible" and going down "a bizarre, religious rabbit hole" to justify their killings.

Before her sentencing, Lori made her first public statement since her arrest. She said that she had been speaking to Jesus, as well as to her children and to Tammy, and that Tylee, J.J. and Tammy were "happy and extremely busy" in heaven. She also stated, "Jesus Christ knows that no one was murdered in this case. Accidental deaths happen, suicides happen, fatal side effects from medications happen."

An alternate juror during Lori's trial described Lori as "a monster" after seeing graphic photos of Tylee and J.J. as well as Lori and Chad's Hawaii wedding photos after them murdering the children.

On May 30, 2025, Lori's attorney filed a notice of appeal for her 2023 conviction, demanding a new trial.

==== Chad (2024) ====
On November 9, 2023, Chad's legal team filed three motions to remove the possibility of the death penalty from his murder trial. The final motion stated that Lori had "manipulated" Chad "through emotional and sexual control" and that Chad had "lesser culpability than his co-defendant, who did not face the death penalty." The motions were denied in December.

Chad's trial opened on April 10, 2024. In his opening statement, prosecutor Wood depicted him as a man motivated by "sex, money and power" and craving for significance, who saw his spouse and Lori's children as obstacles to his rightful destiny. Chad's attorney John Prior painted him as a religious man who had been "lured" into adultery by Lori Vallow. Prior's statement also focused on Alex Cox's history of violence and his role as "Lori's protector."

On May 16, Chad's defense team filed a motion for acquittal after it appeared that an amended indictment had incorrectly listed J.J. Vallow's death as having occurred between September 8–9, 2019, instead of September 22–23. Judge Boyce ruled that this clerical error was not ground for acquittal.

Two of Chad's children testified in their father's defense, and said their mother had been experiencing health problems and "was getting tired extremely easily." On the contrary, three former colleagues of Tammy Daybell said that she seemed healthy and energetic up until the day before her death. Tammy's sister also testified that Tammy had seemed fine when she visited her on October 14, 2019.

Chad did not take the stand. During the closing arguments, prosecutor Lindsey Blake summarized the evidence that pointed to Chad's crucial role in coordinating and giving a religious justification to the murders. Prior painted Lori and Alex Cox as the true culprits, stating that Lori had been motivated by greed, that she had manipulated Chad all along and that Chad would likely have been her next victim.

On May 30, 2024, the jury found Chad guilty of first degree murder and conspiracy in the deaths of Tammy, Tylee and J.J. He was also found guilty of grand theft by deception related to the children's killing and of insurance fraud related to Tammy's. It was confirmed that the prosecution would seek the death penalty for Chad.

At his sentencing hearing, Chad chose not to present any mitigating evidence. On June 1, 2024, he was sentenced to death. For the insurance fraud charges, he was sentenced to 15 years in prison, to run concurrent to death, and to the restitution of $130,000 plus $300,000. Since Chad had been deemed indigent, no fines were added to the insurance fraud sentence.

Tammy's extended family, Matt and Heather Daybell, as well as the Boudreaux, Cox and Shiflet families issued statements expressing their relief at the end of the Idaho trials and their thoughts for the victims. Chad was put on death row at Idaho Maximum Security Institution.

On June 5, 2024, Chad's attorneys filed notice of appeal to Idaho Supreme Court asking them to review verdict and death penalty sentence.

=== Lori's trials in Arizona (2025) ===
The Maricopa County Superior Courthouse in Phoenix, Arizona, where Lori Vallow Daybell stood trial.

In November 2023, Lori was extradited to Arizona to face her two conspiracy charges there. She pleaded not guilty to both. In February 2024, her trial was scheduled to begin on August 1 of the same year, though the judge mentioned that it might be moved at a later date due to the amount of evidence to process. In June, Lori's defense team in Arizona filed a motion requesting a delay for the trial. Lori objected and continued to assert her right to a speedy trial. On July 2, the lawyers' request was granted and the trial date was moved to February 24, 2025.

In October 2024, Colby Ryan posted on his YouTube channel the recording of a telephone conversation he had had with his mother from her prison. During their exchange, Lori claimed that she received "higher knowledge" directly from Jesus and was on a "divine mission," said that Tylee and J.J. had visited her in spirit, and suggested that Tylee had accidentally killed J.J. and then taken her own life in remorse. Colby commented that his mother was "beyond deceived."

Also in October 2024, Lori's attorneys made a request for a competency hearing. One week later, she requested to waive her right to counsel and act as her own attorney. At a December 5, 2024, hearing, Lori was deemed by a doctor to be mentally fit and competent to stand trial. Judge Justin Beresky also granted Lori's request to represent herself. Lori said at the hearing that she had "real trial experience" and had been studying case law since her incarceration.

The court decided that the Charles Vallow case and the Brandon Boudreaux case would be tried separately. The judge moved again the trial date for the Charles Vallow conspiracy case, this time to March 31, 2025. Her trial over the murder attempt on Brandon Boudreaux was eventually scheduled to begin in late May.

On March 7, 2025, Dateline NBC aired Lori's first-ever media interview. During a "combative" exchange with Keith Morrison, she maintained her innocence, tried again to pin J.J.'s death on Tylee and claimed that Jesus had shown her that she and Chad would be "exonerated" and released from prison in the future. She told Morrison that she might go on Dancing with the Stars after her release.

In both Arizona trials, members of the jury had to be unaware of Lori and her previous convictions.

==== Charles Vallow case ====
Lori's trial over Charles' death began on March 31 with jury selection. Lori told jurors that their role was to "protect" her from the state.

On April 7, during her opening statement, Lori maintained that Alex Cox had shot Charles in self-defense and announced that she would provide proof of this. She used the phrase "The evidence will show..." over 70 times during her statement. The prosecution said that Lori had conspired to murder Charles so she could access his life insurance policy and marry Chad, that Cox had staged the home to make it look like Charles had attacked him and Lori, and that there was no evidence Cox had been hit with a baseball bat like he claimed.

Lori subpoenaed several witnesses, but two were stricken by the court and others couldn't be located or served. At one point, Lori "aggressively" cross-examined a witness who had gone on a date with Charles the day before he was killed: Lori asked the woman if she went on dates with married men. Adam Cox, Lori's surviving brother, testified for the prosecution, saying that he had "no doubt" Lori had conspired with Alex to murder Charles. When Charles was killed, he and Adam had been planning to confront Lori together about her beliefs. Kay Woodcock testified on how her brother Charles had been concerned for his safety. Charles had been hit by two bullets: evidence showed that he was lying on the floor when he was shot the second time.

Lori ultimately did not call any witnesses or present evidence, nor did she testify in her own defense. She made a verbal motion for a Rule 20 judgment of acquittal, arguing that no evidence had been presented that would allow a jury to find her guilty. The judge denied her motion. In her closing argument, Lori reiterated that Charles had been killed in self-defense and told the jurors, "Don't let them turn my family tragedy into a crime."

On April 22, 2025, Lori was found guilty of conspiring to murder Charles. After the verdict, she agreed to several aggravating factors. One of the jurors told reporters that Lori hadn't done herself any favors by choosing to represent herself in court: "Many days she was just smiling and laughing and didn’t seem to take anything very seriously." When asked by reporters if she had a message for Lori, Kay Woodcock said, "We gotcha, and you're not the smartest person in the room. Everybody's going to forget about you."

On May 1, Lori filed a motion demanding a new trial for the Charles Vallow murder case, claiming that a juror had been aware of her prior murder convictions. She also claimed there had been discovery violations, prosecutorial misconduct, and a lack of impartiality by the court, and that her rights had been violated under the Religious Freedom Restoration Act. Her motion was denied on May 23.

==== Brandon Boudreaux case ====
After Lori was found guilty of conspiring to murder Charles Vallow, Maricopa County attorney Rachel Mitchell confirmed that despite Lori's multiple convictions, she fully intended to prosecute her for the murder attempt on Brandon Boudreaux, as it was important for Boudreaux "to be able to have his story vindicated."

Lori filed a motion to cancel her trial in the Brandon Boudreaux case, claiming that her constitutional right to a speedy trial had been violated. The judge rejected that motion on May 9. During the hearing, Lori argued with Judge Beresky over jury selection and witnesses. After her motion was denied, she demanded that the judge recuse himself, claiming that he demonstrated bias against her by rejecting all her motions. The judge answered that he would grant a motion by Lori if she filed one that had legal merit. On May 28, Lori filed a motion for the judge to recuse himself, alleging "personal bias or prejudice" and religious discrimination against her. Her motion was denied the next day. She filed three motions for recusal against Judge Beresky during the proceedings.

Lori's second Arizona trial began on May 29 with jury selection. The next day, jury selection had to be halted after Lori said she was feeling sick. On June 2, Lori appeared in court in a wheelchair, saying she was suffering from nausea, chills and headache, and crying loudly. The trial was postponed for two days. On June 4, Lori appeared again in court, not using a wheelchair but insisting that she was still sick. The judge said that based on an examination that showed Lori had no medical condition preventing her from appearing, the trial would proceed.

During her opening statement, on June 5, Lori claimed her innocence, disputing that the event was not a crime at all or that a shooting had actually occurred. She discussed the meaning of the word 'conspiracy' by comparing her own case to Judas conspiring against Jesus and Cain against Abel, and stated that she had no malice towards anyone and was "all about spreading love."

Brandon Boudreaux took the stand, telling the court that Lori had contributed to the breakup of his marriage and recounting the moment he was shot. Prosecutor Treena Kay showed the evidence, including cellphone location data, that pointed to Lori's involvement in the preparations for the murder. On June 6, Lori cross-examined Boudreaux and the private investigator he had hired after being shot. She cast suspicion on her niece Melani by asking if she had a financial gain at Boudreaux's death. The prosecutor mentioned that Melani was under investigation. Of the few people who knew Boudreaux's new address in Gilbert, only his estranged then-wife had connections with Lori and Alex Cox.

Also on June 6, Lori was briefly removed from the courtroom after failing to comply with the court's instructions and disregarding sustained objections. The judge threatened to revoke her self-representation. On June 9, Lori filed a motion to recuse Chief Judge Jennifer Green, who had denied her multiple motions to recuse Judge Beresky. She also filed a motion to "dismiss abuse of discretion." Both were denied.

The rear tire of the Jeep used in the shooting had been removed to allow the shooter to aim at Boudreaux. Prosecutors showed video footage of Lori, Alex and Chad putting a tire into the storage locker that Lori rented in Rexburg.

Once again, Lori did not testify in her defense or call witnesses. She instead tried to cast doubt on nearly every piece of evidence, also suggesting that data could have been tampered with. In a tearful closing argument, she said that there was no evidence against her, that she was the victim of a vendetta by Boudreaux who blamed her for the failure of his marriage and had been working for six years with law enforcement to get to her, and that it was time for healing. The prosecution summed up the evidence of a conspiracy between Lori, Chad, Alex and Melani. Lori again asked to be acquitted outside the presence of the jury, claiming that the presented evidence was insufficient to prove her guilt. The judge ruled against her, considering that the prosecution had presented a compelling case.

On June 12, Lori was found guilty of conspiring to murder Brandon Boudreaux, after the jury had deliberated for less than 30 minutes. Brandon Boudreaux, standing with Kay Woodcock and Colby Ryan, stated that though facing Lori at the trial had been difficult for him, he had owed it to Charles, Tylee, J.J. and Tammy to speak, "because [he] could."

On June 25, Lori filed a motion requesting a new trial, citing her own health condition during the trial and lack of impartiality by the court. On June 26, she granted an interview to East Idaho News, in which she said that she still loved Chad, reaffirmed her innocence, and predicted that she and Chad would be exonerated. Her motion asking for a new trial was denied on July 22.

==== Sentencing ====
Prosecutors requested a life sentence without parole for each case, to run concurrently with the convictions in Idaho. Sentencing for both cases took place on July 25. During her final testimony, Lori claimed that she had been denied a fair trial and said God would set prisoners free. Judge Beresky said Lori had "shown blatant disregard for humanity" and should never be released from prison. Lori was given two consecutive life sentences without the possibility of parole before 25 years. She was also fined $267,000 on each case and given a lifetime no-contact order for Brandon Boudreaux, Kay Woodcock and several other relatives of Charles Vallow.

In August, Lori filed a notice of appeal for both her Arizona convictions. That same month, she was extradited back to Idaho to serve her sentences there. She was incarcerated at Pocatello Women's Correctional Center.

== Media depictions ==
In 2020, Investigation Discovery released a three-episode documentary series entitled Doomsday: The Missing Children, which contained first-hand accounts of J.J.'s grandparents Larry and Kay Woodcock, Lori's brother Adam Cox, and former KPHO-TV reporter Kim Powell.

In 2021, Lifetime released a dramatization of the Lori Vallow story as a made-for-TV film titled Doomsday Mom, also marketed with the subtitle The Lori Vallow Story, starring Lauren Lee Smith as Lori, Marc Blucas as Chad, Linda Purl as Kay, and Patrick Duffy as Larry.

In 2022, Netflix released the three-episode documentary series entitled Sins of Our Mother, primarily centered from the perspective of her surviving child and Tylee's older brother, Colby Ryan.

The story of the case was the subject of investigative journalist Leah Sottile's 2022 book When the Moon Turns to Blood.

In 2026, KSL Podcasts announced a new podcast titled Deceived: The Daybell Story hosted by Nate Eaton, the reporter who tracked down Chad and Lori Daybell when they were living in Hawaii.

== See also ==
- Apocalyptic beliefs among Latter-day Saints
- Predictions and claims for the Second Coming – Specific dates predicted for the Second Coming
- List of murdered American children
- List of solved missing person cases (post-2000)
- List of serial killers in the United States
- List of people sentenced to more than one life imprisonment
