= Mark Biltz =

American Christian pastor and author

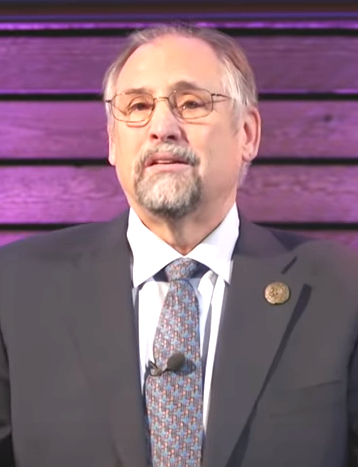
- Mark Biltz, April 2020
- Born: June 25, 1956 (age 70)
- Education: Newman University (Kansas)
- Occupations: pastor, author

Mark Biltz (born June 25, 1956) is an American Christian pastor and author.

His theories correlate solar and lunar eclipses with biblical prophecy, and he has published books on the topic. He is the Washington state director of Christians United for Israel. He began writing about the "blood moon" tetrad phenomenon in 2008, and has come to be known as "the blood moons pastor" or "Blood Moon Biltz". His writings correlate lunar and solar eclipses with the modern State of Israel.

== Biography ==
In 1975, he attended Newman University (Kansas) and started to take an interest in Judaic studies. Soon after, he left the Roman Catholic Church and studied evangelism.

In 1987, he moved to Washington state and served as an administrative teacher of South King County Bible College in Seattle, Washington.

In 2008, he started researching a phenomenon he called the "Blood Moon", correlating data on NASA's website with the Hebrew calendar and the modern State of Israel. Since then, he has come to be known as "Blood Moons Biltz" and “the blood moons pastor”.

Biltz hosts his own show on the PTL TV Network entitled Discovering the Ancient Paths.

== Works ==
- Blood Moons: Decoding the Imminent Heavenly Signs (2014) ISBN 978-1936488117
- Sooner Than You Think: A Prophetic Guide to the End Times (with Sid Roth, Perry Stone, Tom Horn, L.A. Marzulli, Paul McGuire, and John Shorey, 2015) ISBN 978-0768406092
- God's Day Timer: The Believer's Guide to Divine Appointments (2016) ISBN 978-1944229238
- The Three Messiahs: The Startling Connection Between the Jewish Messiah, the Antichrist, and the Twelfth Imam (2017) ISBN 978-1617957444
- Decoding the Antichrist and the End Times: What the Bible Says and What the Future Holds (2019) ISBN 978-1629995977
- Decoding the Prophet Jeremiah: What an Ancient Prophet Says About Today (2020) ISBN 978-1629997285

== TV appearances ==
Year	Title	Role	Notes
2009-2014	It's Supernatural	Himself	TV series
2013-2014	Prophecy in the News	Himself	TV series
2014	Let the Lion Roar	Messenger	Documentary
2014-2015	Praise the Lord	Himself	TV series
2015	Four Blood Moons	Himself	Documentary

== See also ==
- Blood moon prophecy
- Center for Jewish–Christian Understanding and Cooperation
- John Hagee
- Predictions and claims for the Second Coming
