= Julie Rowe =

American author and self-proclaimed clairvoyant

- Born: 1972 or 1973 (age 53–54)
- Occupation: Author
- Known for: Self-proclaimed clairvoyant and claims that the apocalypse was imminent

Julie Rowe is an American author and self-proclaimed clairvoyant. She claims to have had a near-death experience in 2004, during which she also claims to have had visions pertaining to end-times events. Rowe published her account in a series of books.

== Writing career and apocalypse predictions ==
A longtime member of the Church of Jesus Christ of Latter-day Saints (LDS church) until 2019, Rowe notably appealed to a Mormon audience. In 2015, some Mormon circles responded to her words with fear because they interpreted her prediction that the world would end to mean (around) the September lunar eclipse, although she did not specifically state this date. The LDS Church responded by issuing a call for calm and stressing that it did not endorse the membership's understanding of this view.

The LDS Church Education System placed Rowe's book A Greater Tomorrow on a list of "spurious materials" that was circulated to teachers of high-school seminaries and to college-age Institutes of Religion. The list stated:

"Although Sister Rowe is an active member of The Church of Jesus Christ of Latter-day Saints, her book is not endorsed by the church and should not be recommended to students or used as a resource in teaching them. The experiences she shares are her own personal experiences and do not necessarily reflect Church doctrine".

In the course of the 2010s, Rowe remained a very popular author and speaker among certain Mormon "extremist" circles, notably survivalist "preppers" who believed apocalypse to be imminent and worked to prepare for Christ's Second Coming. Claiming a close connection to the "spirit world" due to her near-death experience, Rowe predicted a foreign invasion of the United States, plagues and a massive economic collapse.

In April 2019, Rowe was excommunicated from the LDS Church.

In 2020, Rowe received further attention when Chad Daybell, her former publisher, was arrested in connection with the murders of his wife and his lover's two children. Rowe initially defended Daybell's character and said she was convinced of his innocence. She later claimed Daybell had sexually assaulted her in 2018.

== Selected works ==
- A Greater Tomorrow (2014)
- The Time is Now (2014)
- From Tragedy to Destiny (2016)
- New Revolution:A Vision of America's Future (2020)

== See also ==
- 2011 end times prediction
- Apocalyptic beliefs among Latter-day Saints
- Blood moon prophecy
- Harold Camping
- End time
- List of dates predicted for apocalyptic events
- David Meade
- Millennialism
- True-believer syndrome
- Unfulfilled Christian religious predictions
