= John Hagee =

American televangelist (born 1940)

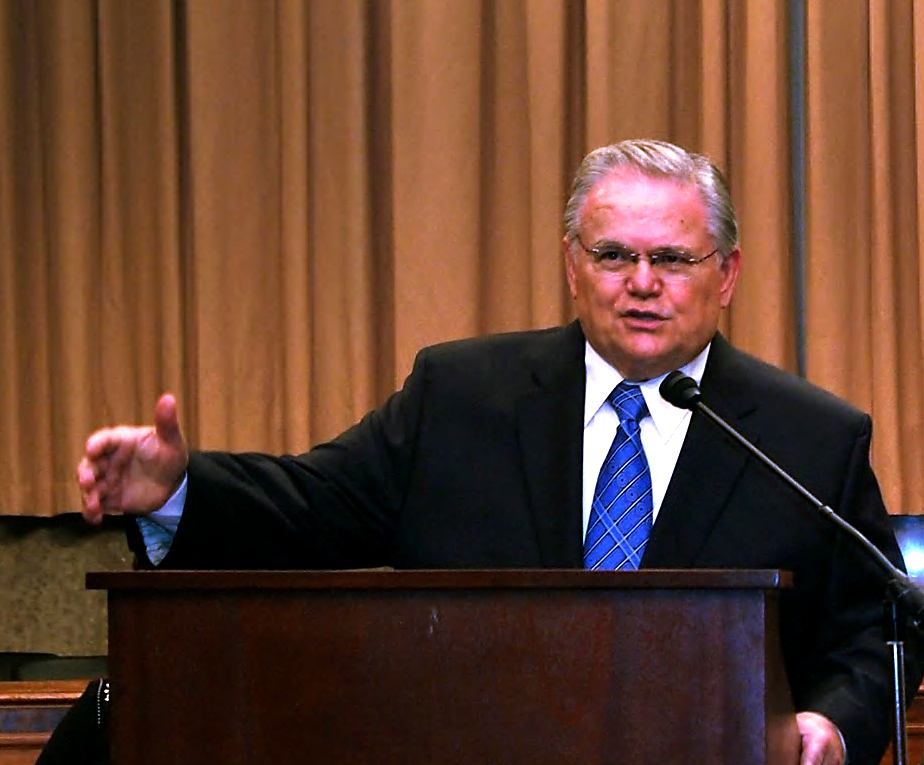
- Hagee in Washington, D.C., July 2007
- Born: John Charles Hagee; April 12, 1940 (age 86); Baytown, Texas, U.S.
- Education: Trinity University (BSc); University of North Texas (MSc)
- Occupations: Pastor, author
- Organization: John Hagee Ministries
- Spouse: Martha Downing (1960–1975) Diana Castro (1976–current)
- Website: www.jhm.org

John Charles Hagee (born April 12, 1940) is an American pastor and televangelist. He founded John Hagee Ministries, which telecasts to the United States and Canada. He is also the founder and chairman of the Christian Zionist organization Christians United for Israel, the largest Zionist organization in America.

Hagee has attracted controversy over his comments on the Catholic Church, Jewish people and Islam, and promotion of the blood moon prophecy.

== Early and personal life ==
Hagee was born in Baytown, Texas, on April 12, 1940. He studied at Southwestern Assemblies of God University in Waxahachie, Texas, and received a Bachelor of Science, and then studied at Trinity University and obtained a second Bachelor of Science. He also studied at the University of North Texas in educational administration and received a master's degree in 1966.

Hagee has been married twice. In 1960, he married Martha Downing, and they divorced in 1975. In 1976, he married a member of his congregation, Diana Castro.

He has a son, Matt Hagee, who is also a pastor.

== Career ==
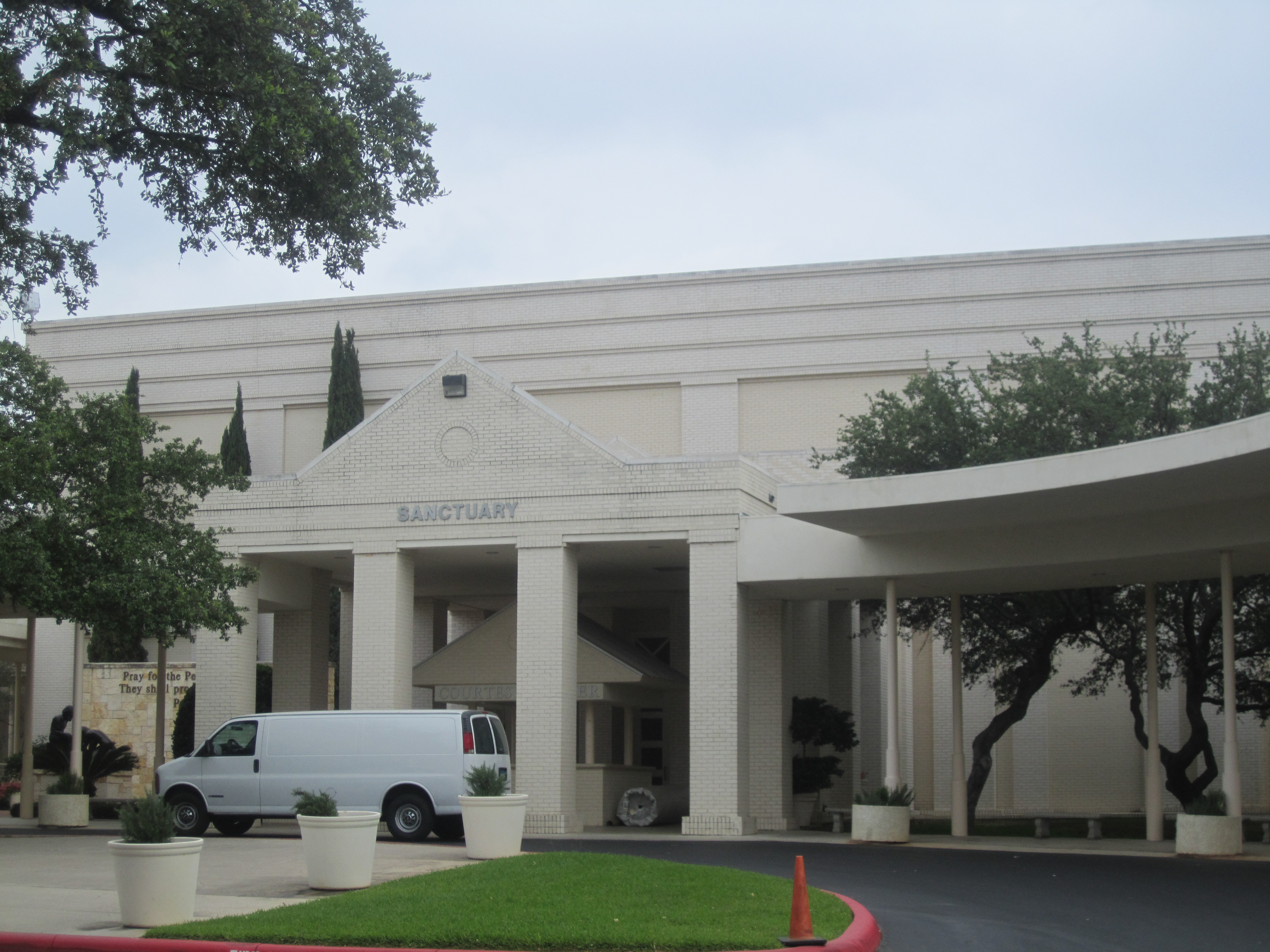
Cornerstone Church

Hagee founded Trinity Church in San Antonio, Texas, in 1966. In 1975, Hagee wrote a letter to his congregation that he was guilty of immorality, after which he divorced his wife, Martha Downing. Criticism from the divorce caused Hagee to resign.

Hagee founded The Church at Castle Hills in 1975. The church grew in size and following two expansions, its second sanctuary was named Cornerstone Church. The church has adopted Pentecostal beliefs, including biblical literalism, speaking in tongues, divine healing, the prosperity gospel, and absolute opposition to abortion. Beginning in 1981 in San Antonio, following Operation Opera, Hagee has organized "A Night to Honor Israel" events aiming to show support for the State of Israel.

Hagee has been politically active. In 1968, he endorsed Democrat George Wallace in his bid for president. His advocacy included organizing and mobilizing a youth movement called "Wallace Youth".

In 1996, Hagee spoke on behalf of Republican presidential primary candidate Alan Keyes, who in 2004 lost the U.S. Senate election in Illinois to Barack Obama. In 2002, Hagee endorsed the conservative State Representative John Shields in the latter's unsuccessful bid for the Republican primary for the District 25 seat in the Texas Senate. Hagee dubbed Shields's opponent, incumbent Jeff Wentworth, "the most pro-abortion" of 181 legislators in both houses of the Texas legislature.

On February 7, 2006, Hagee and some 400 leaders from across the Christian and Jewish communities formed Christians United for Israel (CUFI). This lobbies members of the United States Congress, using a biblical stance for promoting Christian Zionism. Around that time he received death threats for his activism on behalf of the State of Israel and hired bodyguards for protection.

In 2008, Hagee endorsed Senator John McCain in the presidential contest against Barack Obama. After Hagee's endorsement of McCain, a furor arose over statements made by Hagee that were perceived by some as anti-Catholic and antisemitic. Following Hagee's remarks, McCain publicly distanced himself from Hagee.

Hagee was the primary funding source for the Israeli Zionist group Im Tirtzu, until he cut ties with the organization in 2013. He is also anti-abortion and stopped giving money to Israel's Hadassah Medical Center when it began offering the procedure.

In 2016, Hagee endorsed Donald Trump in the 2016 presidential election.

On 11 March 2018, John Hagee announced that he had passed leadership of Cornerstone Church to his son, Matt Hagee.

In 2023, Hagee endorsed Nikki Haley in the 2024 Republican Primary.

== Views ==
=== Dispensationalism ===
Hagee's theological views belong to a particular strand of dispensationalism within American evangelicalism, shaped in part by apocalypticism. A Christian fundamentalist, he holds eschatological views that lead him to believe the end of the world is imminent. He believes that the hypothesized return of Jesus will be preceded by a so-called "rapture", in which Christians will be disappeared up to heaven, leaving non-Christians to endure seven years of suffering before the Battle of Armageddon. Jesus will fight and win that battle, then create a new earth over which he will reign for 1,000 years.

Hagee believes the world is in the end times and that human actions cannot alter what is to come because events unfold according to God's plan. He has stated: "We do not believe that we can speed up the End of Days one second. Why? Because we believe God is sovereign. That He has set the time. We are powerless to change God's timetable. That is what makes him God." Accordingly, Hagee denies that his views on subjects such as Zionism and support for the state of Israel stem from his eschatology. However, commentators have observed that dispensationalists such as Hagee appear to welcome the prospect of a war between Israel and Iran, as such a conflict would signal the predicted final confrontation. Hagee described the 2026 Iran war as part of a divine plan.

=== Jewish people ===
Hagee has stated that he believes the Christian Bible commands Christians to support the State of Israel, a controversial Christian doctrine known as Christian Zionism. Reform Jewish rabbi Eric Yoffie criticized Hagee in 2008 for being an "extremist" on Israeli policy and for disparaging non-Christian faiths. Despite his support for the State of Israel, Hagee has made claims about the Jewish people that have been interpreted as antisemitic and anti-Jewish. Using Jeremiah 16:16 from the Hebrew Bible as a supposed prooftext, he interpreted the passage's references to fishers and hunters as symbolizing, respectively, the positive motivation he attributed to Theodor Herzl and Zionism and the negative motivation he attributed to Adolf Hitler and Nazism. He argued that both men had been sent by God to bring Jews back to Israel, and suggested that God had willed the Holocaust because most Jews had ignored Herzl. Hagee has claimed that Adolf Hitler was born from a lineage of "accursed, genocidally murderous half-breed Jews". He has stated that the antichrist will be "a homosexual" and "partially Jewish, as was Adolf Hitler." Citing material from the Book of Jeremiah, he claimed that the persecution of Jews throughout history, implicitly including the Holocaust, was due to the Jewish people's disobedience of God.

=== Homosexuality ===
In 2006, he claimed that Hurricane Katrina was God's punishment for a planned pride parade. In January 2013 on "The Hagee Hotline", Hagee referred to anything outside of a heterosexual marriage as "two disturbed people playing house." In September 2013, Hagee announced his opposition to an ordinance in San Antonio that would protect LGBT rights, but later stated on television he no longer opposed it following the removal of a clause that allowed the city council to consider whether candidates for city boards and commissions had discriminated against LGBTQ people in “word or deed”, a removal he also took credit for.

Following the legalization of gay marriage in 2015, Hagee referred to America as "the new Sodom and Gomorrah", and said that "If God doesn't punish America, then God owes the world an apology for destroying Sodom and Gomorrah".

=== Catholicism ===
Hagee purported that Adolf Hitler's antisemitism was especially derived from his Catholic background, and he also purported that Hitler was "a spiritual leader in the Catholic Church," as well as purporting that the Catholic Church under Pope Pius XII encouraged Nazism. Hagee also blamed the Catholic Church for instigating the Dark Ages, claiming that it allowed the Crusaders to rape and murder with impunity. William Donohue, the president of the Catholic League for Civil and Religious Rights, rejected the comments and Hagee's explanations for them. On May 12, 2008, after discussions with Donohue and other Catholic leaders, Hagee issued a letter of apology, expressing regret for "any comments that Catholics have found hurtful." The apology was accepted by William Donohue.

=== Islam ===
Hagee has made demonizing comments about Islam. Hagee has claimed that "Islam not only condones violence; it commands it". He has also claimed that a contrast exists between Islam's "violent nature" and Christianity's "loving nature" and that the Quran teaches, and Muslims have a mandate, to kill Jews and Christians.

=== Blood moon prophecy ===
Hagee, along with Mark Biltz, promoted the blood moon prophecy in a 2013 book. The two men claimed that a tetrad which began with the April 2014 lunar eclipse was a sign of the end times as described in the Bible, and the tetrad ended with the lunar eclipse on September 27–28, 2015. The prediction was criticized by scientists.

=== Global warming ===
During an interview in 2007, by Glenn Beck of CNN, Hagee stated that he does not believe in the scientific consensus on climate change, and that he sees the Kyoto Protocol as a conspiracy aimed at manipulating the U.S. economy. More generally, his belief, derived from his eschatology, and in line with other prominent American evangelicals such as Jerry Falwell, is that the prophesied end of the world is close, and concern about global warming is therefore an unnecessary distraction. Thus, Hagee has condemned the Evangelical Climate Initiative and opposes Christian involvement in climate issues. Nevertheless, critics have noted the disconnect between this hands-off position on climate change and the proactive approach towards the support of Israel.

== Bibliography ==
- Ansari, Humayun; Hafez, Farid (April 2012). From the Far Right to the Mainstream: Islamophobia in Party Politics and the Media. Campus Verlag. ISBN 978-3-593-39648-4.
- Batut-Lucas, Katia (July 3, 2014). Le sionisme chrétien contemporain aux États-Unis : entre religion et politique (PhD thesis). doi:10.70675/e97a468fz310ez4eb2zb0e9zd9c6bb54cbd1.
- Chetty, Irvin G. (2014). "The New Apostolic Reformation and Christian Zionism" (PDF). Journal for the Study of Religion. 27 (2): 297–312. ISSN 1011-7601. JSTOR 24799454.
- Durbin, Sean (October 2, 2018). Righteous Gentiles: Religion, Identity, and Myth in John Hagee's Christians United for Israel. BRILL. ISBN 978-90-04-38500-9.
- Durbin, Sean (January 15, 2021). "John C. Hagee". In Crossley, James; Lockhart, Alastair (eds.). Critical Dictionary of Apocalyptic and Millenarian Movements. doi:10.17863/CAM.121524.
- Rahm, Dianne (November 18, 2014). Climate Change Policy in the United States: The Science, the Politics and the Prospects for Change. McFarland. ISBN 978-0-7864-5801-1.
