= Jeremiah 17 =

Book of Jeremiah, chapter 17

- ← chapter 16 chapter 18 →
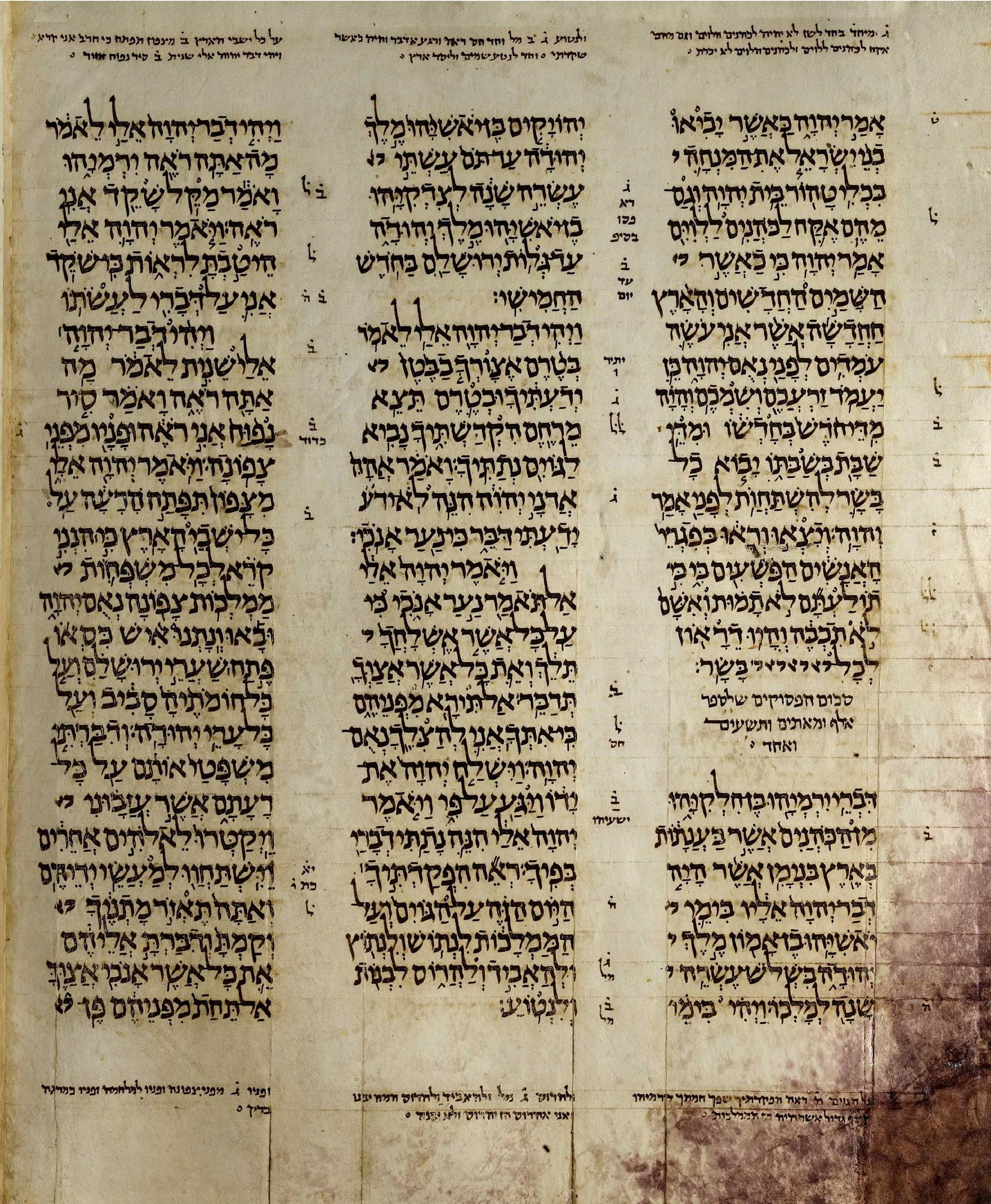
- A high resolution scan of the Aleppo Codex showing the Book of Jeremiah (the sixth book in Nevi'im).
- Book: Book of Jeremiah
- Hebrew Bible part: Nevi'im
- Order in the Hebrew part: 6
- Category: Latter Prophets
- Christian Bible part: Old Testament
- Order in the Christian part: 24

Jeremiah 17 is the seventeenth chapter of the Book of Jeremiah in the Hebrew Bible or the Old Testament of the Christian Bible. This book contains prophecies attributed to the prophet Jeremiah, and is one of the Books of the Prophets. This chapter includes the third of the passages known as the "Confessions of Jeremiah" (Jeremiah 17:14–18).

== Text ==
The original text of this chapter is written in the Hebrew language. This chapter is divided into 27 verses.

=== Textual witnesses ===
Some early manuscripts containing the text of this chapter in Hebrew are of the Masoretic Text tradition, which includes the Codex Cairensis (895), the Petersburg Codex of the Prophets (916), Aleppo Codex (10th century), Codex Leningradensis (1008). Some fragments containing parts of this chapter were found among the Dead Sea Scrolls, i.e., 4QJer^{a} (4Q70; 225-175 BCE) with extant verses 8‑26.

There is also a translation into Koine Greek known as the Septuagint (with a different verse numbering), made in the last few centuries BCE. Extant ancient manuscripts of the Septuagint version include Codex Vaticanus (B; $\mathfrak{G}$^{B}; 4th century), Codex Sinaiticus (S; BHK: $\mathfrak{G}$^{S}; 4th century), Codex Alexandrinus (A; $\mathfrak{G}$^{A}; 5th century) and Codex Marchalianus (Q; $\mathfrak{G}$^{Q}; 6th century). Verses 1-4 are not found in the Septuagint.

== Parashot ==
The parashah sections listed here are based on the Aleppo Codex. Jeremiah 17 is a part of the Sixth prophecy (Jeremiah 14-17) in the section of Prophecies of Destruction (Jeremiah 1-25). {P}: open parashah; {S}: closed parashah.

{S} 17:1-4 {S} 17:5-6 {S} 17:7-10 {S} 17:11-13 {P} 17:14-18 {S} 17:19-27 {P}

== The sin and punishment of Judah (17:1–11) ==
=== Verse 1 ===
The sin of Judah is written with a pen of iron,

and with the point of a diamond:

it is graven upon the table of their heart,

and upon the horns of your altars;

Similarly, in Job 19:23–24:

Oh, that my words were written … with an iron pen.

The image of "sin written with an iron pen" is used by Israeli poets Dvora Amir, Dahlia Falah and Liat Kap, criticising Israel's occupation of lands conquered in the 1967 war, and the resulting oppression of the Palestinian people.

=== Verses 5-8 ===
Verses 5-8 contrast the prospects for a tree in a desert and a tree whose roots can reach water, and apply these images to curse one man and bless another. Verna Holyhead suggests that the tree by water has been carefully transplanted there, from the desert, in order that it can survive:

For he shall be like a tree planted by the waters,
Which spreads out its roots by the river,
And will not fear when heat comes;
But its leaf will be green,
And will not be anxious in the year of drought,
Nor will cease from yielding fruit.

- One who "trusts in the Lord" (verse 7) is described as a "fruitful, well-watered tree" (Psalm 1:3; Psalm 92:12–15; Proverbs 3:18).
- "Fear" (from Hebrew: ירא yi-rā; as in Masoretic Ketiv, LXX and Vulgate): in Qere and Targum read "see" (from Hebrew: יראה yir-'eh).

== See also ==
- Benjamin
- David
- Jerusalem
- Judah
- Negev
- Sabbath
- Related Bible parts: Psalm 1, Psalm 92, Proverbs 3, Jeremiah 14, Jeremiah 15

== Bibliography ==
- Ulrich, Eugene, ed. (2010). The Biblical Qumran Scrolls: Transcriptions and Textual Variants. Brill.
- Würthwein, Ernst (1995). The Text of the Old Testament. Translated by Rhodes, Erroll F. Grand Rapids, MI: Wm. B. Eerdmans. ISBN 0-8028-0788-7.
