= Jeremiah 16 =

Book of Jeremiah, chapter 16

- ← chapter 15 chapter 17 →
- Book of Jeremiah in Hebrew Bible, MS. Sassoon 1053, images 283–315.
- Book: Book of Jeremiah
- Hebrew Bible part: Nevi'im
- Order in the Hebrew part: 6
- Category: Latter Prophets
- Christian Bible part: Old Testament
- Order in the Christian part: 24

Jeremiah 16 is the sixteenth chapter of the Book of Jeremiah in the Hebrew Bible or the Old Testament of the Christian Bible. This book contains prophecies attributed to the prophet Jeremiah, and is one of the Books of the Prophets. In the first part of this chapter (verses 1 to 9), Jeremiah is instructed to adopt a lifestyle which will serve as a "symbolic enactment of God's word", comparable to the instructions given to other prophets: see Hosea 1:2–9, Isaiah 8:3–4 and Ezekiel 24:15–24.

== Text ==
The original text of this chapter is written in the Hebrew language. This chapter is divided into 21 verses.

=== Textual witnesses ===
Some early manuscripts containing the text of this chapter in Hebrew are of the Masoretic Text tradition, which includes the Codex Cairensis (895), the Petersburg Codex of the Prophets (916), Aleppo Codex (10th century), Codex Leningradensis (1008).

There is also a translation into Koine Greek known as the Septuagint, made in the last few centuries BCE. Extant ancient manuscripts of the Septuagint version include Codex Vaticanus (B; $\mathfrak{G}$^{B}; 4th century), Codex Sinaiticus (S; BHK: $\mathfrak{G}$^{S}; 4th century), Codex Alexandrinus (A; $\mathfrak{G}$^{A}; 5th century) and Codex Marchalianus (Q; $\mathfrak{G}$^{Q}; 6th century).

== Parashot ==
The parashah sections listed here are based on the Aleppo Codex. Jeremiah 16 is a part of the Sixth prophecy (Jeremiah 14-17) in the section of Prophecies of Destruction (Jeremiah 1-25). {P}: open parashah; {S}: closed parashah.

{S} 16:1–2 {S} 16:3–4 {S} 16:5–8 {P} 16:9–13 {P} 16:14-5 {P} 16:16–18 {P} 16:19–21 {S}

== Verse 2 ==
"You shall not take a wife, nor shall you have sons or daughters in this place."

According to Reformation theologian John Calvin, "the prohibition to marry was full of meaning; it was to show that the people were wholly given up to destruction".

== Verse 3 ==
For thus says the Lord concerning the sons and daughters who are born in this place, and concerning their mothers who bore them and their fathers who begot them in this land:

== Verse 4 ==
... they shall not be lamented nor shall they be buried.

Repeated in verse 6:

They shall not be buried; neither shall men lament for them.

== Verse 5 ==
"Do not enter the house of mourning, nor go to lament or bemoan them; for I have taken away My peace from this people", says the Lord.

Similarly, the prophet Ezekiel is instructed not to mourn when his own wife dies.

== See also ==
- Egypt
- Israel
- Related Bible parts: Isaiah 8, Hosea 1, Matthew 24, Luke 23, 1 Corinthians 7

== Bibliography ==
- Würthwein, Ernst (1995). The Text of the Old Testament. Translated by Rhodes, Erroll F. Grand Rapids, MI: Wm. B. Eerdmans. ISBN 0-8028-0788-7.
