= Anglican Friends of Israel =

Christian pro-Israel group

Anglican Friends of Israel (formerly Anglicans for Israel) is a group of Anglican Christians who support Israel.

The group, headed by Belfast-born Simon McIlwane, opposes attempts to single out Israel for criticism without placing its actions in context while ignoring the Palestinian contributions to the conflict. According to McIlwane, "Israel is falsely accused of imposing an 'apartheid' system on Palestinians while the education of Palestinian children to hate Jews, and give their lives in the cause of Israel's destruction, is ignored." In May 2012, McIlwain called the anti-Israel protest against the performance of Habimah at The Globe Theater "unwanted, unwarranted and disgraceful."

== See also ==
- Christian Zionism
- Christians United for Israel
- International Christian Embassy Jerusalem
