= Jeremiah 15 =

Book of Jeremiah, chapter 15

- ← chapter 14 chapter 16 →
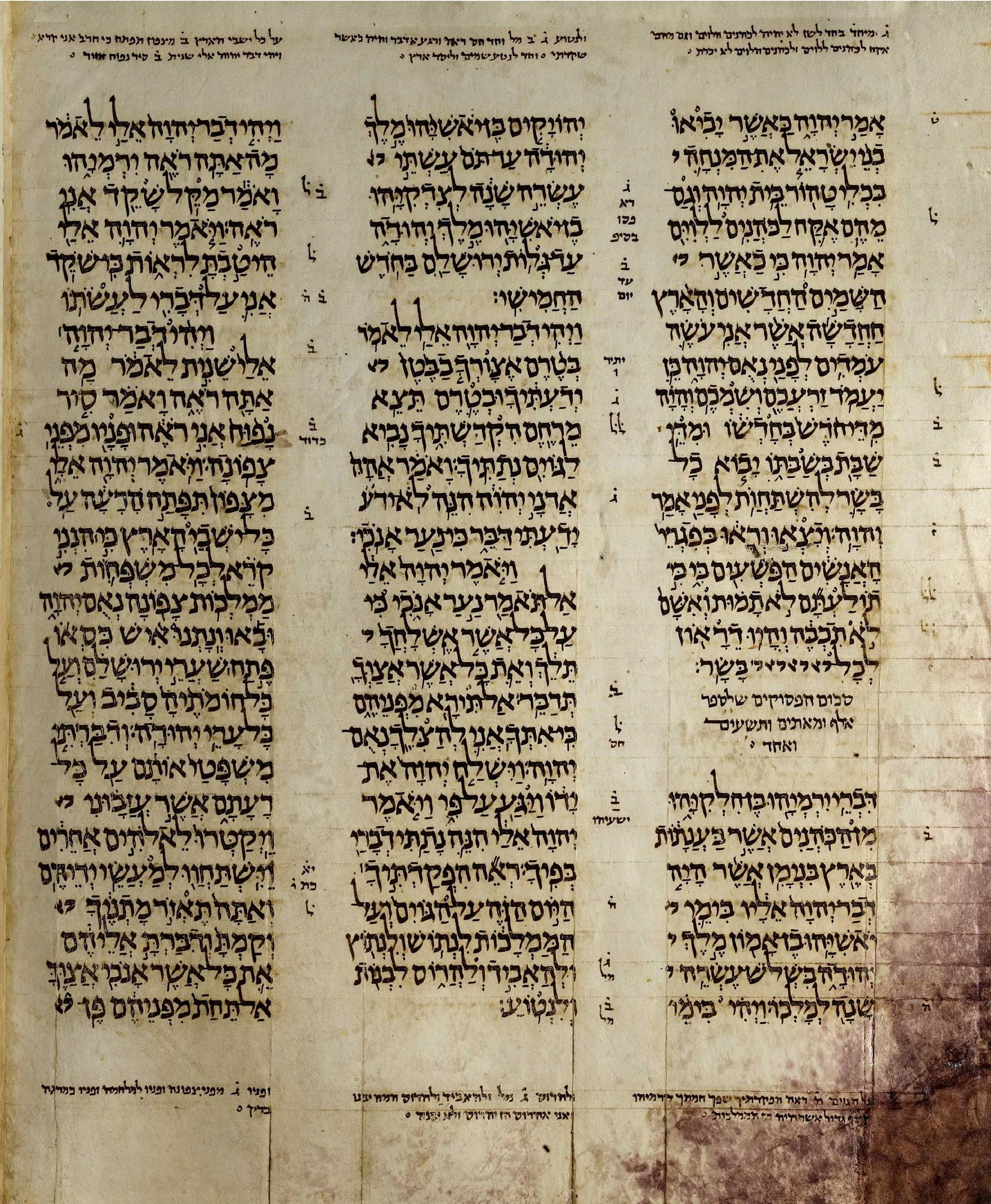
- A high resolution scan of the Aleppo Codex showing the Book of Jeremiah (the sixth book in Nevi'im).
- Book: Book of Jeremiah
- Hebrew Bible part: Nevi'im
- Order in the Hebrew part: 6
- Category: Latter Prophets
- Christian Bible part: Old Testament
- Order in the Christian part: 24

Jeremiah 15 is the fifteenth chapter of the Book of Jeremiah in the Hebrew Bible or the Old Testament of the Christian Bible. This book contains prophecies attributed to the prophet Jeremiah, and is one of the Books of the Prophets. This chapter includes the second of the passages known as the "Confessions of Jeremiah" (Jeremiah 15:10:21).

== Text ==
The original text was written in Hebrew language. This chapter is divided into 21 verses.

=== Textual witnesses ===
Some early manuscripts containing the text of this chapter in Hebrew are of the Masoretic Text tradition, which includes the Codex Cairensis (895), the Petersburg Codex of the Prophets (916), Aleppo Codex (10th century), Codex Leningradensis (1008). Some fragments containing parts of this chapter were found among the Dead Sea Scrolls, i.e., 4QJer^{a} (4Q70; 225-175 BCE) with extant verses 1–2.

There is also a translation into Koine Greek known as the Septuagint, made in the last few centuries BCE. Extant ancient manuscripts of the Septuagint version include Codex Vaticanus (B; $\mathfrak{G}$^{B}; 4th century), Codex Sinaiticus (S; BHK: $\mathfrak{G}$^{S}; 4th century), Codex Alexandrinus (A; $\mathfrak{G}$^{A}; 5th century) and Codex Marchalianus (Q; $\mathfrak{G}$^{Q}; 6th century).

== Parashot ==
The parashah sections listed here are based on the Aleppo Codex. Jeremiah 15 is a part of the Sixth prophecy (Jeremiah 14-17) in the section of Prophecies of Destruction (Jeremiah 1-25). {P}: open parashah; {S}: closed parashah.

{P} 15:1-9 {S} 15:10 {S} 15:11-14 {S} 15:15-16 {S} 15:17-18 {S} 15:19-21 {S}

== No future, yet a future (15:1–4) ==
Verses 1–4, starting a passage that continues to Jeremiah 16:21, parallels Jeremiah 14:11—12 in the rejection of Jeremiah's intercession, as no mediation would work to prevent the impending disaster, not even by Moses or Samuel (verse 1). In chapters 2–10 the enemy comes from the north to Jerusalem, whereas in chapters 11–20 the enemy appears only in 13:20, but 'the modes of tragedy' become more detailed: 'pestilence and sword, famine and captivity' (15:2; 11:22; 14:15; 21:8), as well as 'unburied bodies' (14:16), that birds that scavenge (15:3). The former King Manasseh (2 Kings 21:10-15) is held responsible here, not the people.

=== Verse 1 ===
Then the Lord said to me: Even though Moses and Samuel were to stand before Me, yet My heart would not be with this people. Cast them out of My sight and let them go!

- "Moses and Samuel": both persons were 'well known for their successful intercession on behalf of Israel' (Moses: Exodus 32:11–14, 30–34; Numbers 14:13–19; Deuteronomy 9:18–20, 25–29; Samuel: Psalm 99:6–8; 1 Samuel 7:5–9; 12:19–23), but here the Lord rejects Jeremiah's intercession (Jeremiah 14:19-22).
- "My heart would not be with": lit. in Hebrew: "my soul was not toward".
- "Cast": is from the same Hebrew verb (shalah) used in Exodus 5:1 (translated as "let my people go"), so it could be an 'intentional play' on the Exodus text but here with the 'ominous meaning'.

=== Verse 2 ===
And it shall be, if they say to you, 'Where should we go?'
then you shall tell them, 'Thus says the Lord:

"Such as are for death, to death;
And such as are for the sword, to the sword;
And such as are for the famine, to the famine;
And such as are for the captivity, to the captivity."'

Anticipating the people's question, the Lord prepares a harsh answer (in the sense of "I will not help you. I no longer care what happens to you") by leaving their predicament to death, sword, starvation and captivity, which usually accompany the 'horrors of warfare'.

=== Verse 3 ===
"I will appoint over them four forms of destruction", says the Lord:

"the sword to slay,
the dogs to drag,
the birds of the heavens and the beasts of the earth to devour and destroy.

"Four forms of destruction" in the New King James Version; "four kinds of doom" in the New American Standard Bible, literally "four families".

== Divine Lament(15:5–9) ==
YHWH is lamenting because he is reluctant to destroy the city, using 'a poignant rhetorical question' to display 'divine anguish' and to portray Jerusalem's pitiful isolation (verse 5), but as the female Jerusalem rejected YHWH, so YHWH destroyed her, after YHWH alone puts effort into the relationship and is 'weary of relenting' (verse 6), so they cannot yet be reconciled (cf. Jeremiah 2:1–3:25). However, the poem also invites pity for her (verses 7–9).

== Jeremiah's Lament (15:10–21) ==
Jeremiah's second confession can be compared with YHWH's lament over Jerusalem in some points:

1. YHWH doomed the mothers to childlessness (15:9), whereas Jeremiah's mother doomed him to a life of suffering by giving him birth (15:10)
2. Divine weariness (15:6) has become prophetic anguish (15:18).

This confession is an act of protest in which Jeremiah embodies the questions of the exiles while he complains about his people (verse 15). His hope is that if he repents (verse 19), he will be delivered from 'the hand of the wicked' (verse 21).

=== Verse 10 ===
Woe is me, my mother,
That you have borne me,
A man of strife and a man of contention to the whole earth!
I have neither lent for interest,
Nor have men lent to me for interest.
Every one of them curses me.

The King James Version refers to lending "on usury". Lending money and charging interest to a fellow-Israelite would have been contrary to Deuteronomy 23:19–20. Biblical commentator A. W. Streane describes verses 10–21, Jeremiah's dejection and God's reply, as "one of the most eloquent and pathetic in the Book".

=== Verse 11 ===
Tell me, Lord, have I not served you for their good?

Have I not interceded with you
in time of misfortune and anguish? (NABRE)

The Septuagint wording (Greek: γένοιτο, δέσποτα, genoito, despota, "Know, Lord …") continues Jeremiah's expression of despair from the previous verse, which the Jerusalem Bible describes as "a spiritual crisis of the prophet halfway through his ministry". Streane suggests that "the whole (of verses 10-18) is best taken as Jeremiah’s utterance", although some Hebrew texts and many English translations based on the Hebrew begin this statement with "The Lord said …", thus:

New King James Version:

The Lord said:

“Surely it will be well with your remnant;
Surely I will cause the enemy to intercede with you
In the time of adversity and in the time of affliction".

=== Verse 18 ===
Why is my pain unceasing,

my wound incurable,
refusing to be healed?

Truly, you are to me like a deceitful brook,

like waters that fail.

A deceitful brook flows like a torrent in winter, but presents as a dried-up watercourse in the summer, which "belies the anticipations of the thirsty traveller".

== See also ==
- Hezekiah
- Jerusalem
- Kingdom of Judah
- Manasseh of Judah
- Moses
- Samuel
- Related Bible parts: Exodus 32, Numbers 14, Deuteronomy 9, Jeremiah 14, Ezekiel 14

== Sources ==
- Huey, F. B. (1993). The New American Commentary - Jeremiah, Lamentations: An Exegetical and Theological Exposition of Holy Scripture, NIV Text. B&H Publishing Group. ISBN 9780805401165.
- O'Connor, Kathleen M. (2007). "23. Jeremiah". In Barton, John; Muddiman, John (eds.). The Oxford Bible Commentary (first (paperback) ed.). Oxford University Press. pp. 487–533. ISBN 978-0199277186.
- Würthwein, Ernst (1995). The Text of the Old Testament. Translated by Rhodes, Erroll F. Grand Rapids, MI: Wm. B. Eerdmans. ISBN 0-8028-0788-7.
