= Jeremiah 14 =

Book of Jeremiah, chapter 14

- ← chapter 13 chapter 15 →
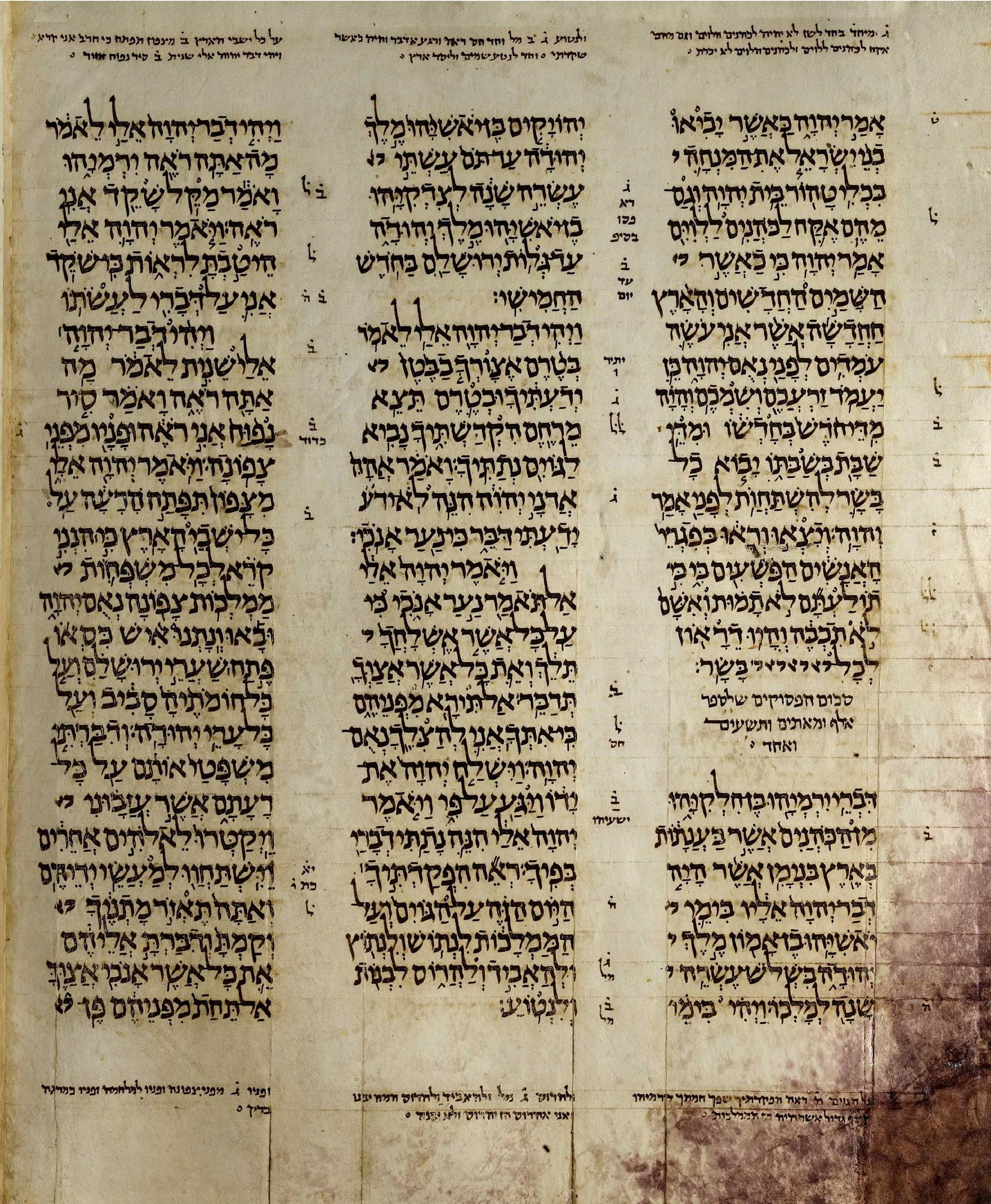
- A high resolution scan of the Aleppo Codex showing the Book of Jeremiah (the sixth book in Nevi'im).
- Book: Book of Jeremiah
- Hebrew Bible part: Nevi'im
- Order in the Hebrew part: 6
- Category: Latter Prophets
- Christian Bible part: Old Testament
- Order in the Christian part: 24

Jeremiah 14 is the fourteenth chapter of the Book of Jeremiah in the Hebrew Bible or the Old Testament of the Christian Bible. This book contains prophecies attributed to the prophet Jeremiah, and is one of the Books of the Prophets.

== Text ==
The original text was written in Hebrew language. This chapter is divided into 22 verses.

=== Textual witnesses ===
Some early manuscripts containing the text of this chapter in Hebrew are of the Masoretic Text tradition, which includes the Codex Cairensis (895), the Petersburg Codex of the Prophets (916), Aleppo Codex (10th century), Codex Leningradensis (1008). Some fragments containing parts of this chapter were found among the Dead Sea Scrolls, i.e., 4QJer^{a} (4Q70; 225-175 BCE) with extant verses 4‑7.

There is also a translation into Koine Greek known as the Septuagint, made in the last few centuries BCE. Extant ancient manuscripts of the Septuagint version include Codex Vaticanus (B; $\mathfrak{G}$^{B}; 4th century), Codex Sinaiticus (S; BHK: $\mathfrak{G}$^{S}; 4th century), Codex Alexandrinus (A; $\mathfrak{G}$^{A}; 5th century) and Codex Marchalianus (Q; $\mathfrak{G}$^{Q}; 6th century).

== Parashot ==
The parashah sections listed here are based on the Aleppo Codex. Jeremiah 14 is a part of the Sixth prophecy (Jeremiah 14-17) in the section of Prophecies of Destruction (Jeremiah 1-25). {P}: open parashah; {S}: closed parashah.

{S} 14:1-9 {S} 14:10 {P} 14:11-12 {S} 14:13 {S} 14:14 {S} 14:15-18 {S} 14:19-22 {P}

== Verse 1 ==
The word of the Lord which came to Jeremiah concerning the drought.

"Drought": is rendered as Droughts (plural) in the New King James Version or the "Great Drought" in the New American Bible Revised Edition.

== Verse 14 ==
And the Lord said to me, “The prophets prophesy lies in My name. I have not sent them, commanded them, nor spoken to them; they prophesy to you a false vision, divination, a worthless thing, and the deceit of their heart.

The false prophets rely on their own reason and the practice of divination instead of "divine commission".

- "A worthless thing" (from Hebrew: אליל or אלול ’ĕ-lîl or ’ĕ-lūl; KJV: “a thing of nought”): collectively "kingdoms of idolatrous worthlessness" worshipped in the time of Isaiah (Isaiah 2:8; Isaiah 10:11; Isaiah 19:1,3 (of Egypt); Isaiah 31:7).

== Verse 15 ==
Therefore thus says the Lord concerning the prophets who prophesy in My name, whom I did not send, and who say, ‘Sword and famine shall not be in this land’—‘By sword and famine those prophets shall be consumed!

== Verse 16 ==
And the people to whom they prophesy shall be cast out in the streets of Jerusalem because of the famine and the sword; they will have no one to bury them—them nor their wives, their sons nor their daughters—for I will pour their wickedness on them.’

== See also ==
- Israel
- Jerusalem
- Judah
- Zion
- Related Bible parts: Isaiah 2, Isaiah 10, Isaiah 19, Isaiah 31, 1 Corinthians 14

== Bibliography ==
- Brown, Francis; Briggs, Charles A.; Driver, S. R. (1994). The Brown-Driver-Briggs Hebrew and English Lexicon (reprint ed.). Hendrickson Publishers. ISBN 978-1565632066.
- The Nelson Study Bible. Thomas Nelson, Inc. 1997. ISBN 9780840715999.
- Ulrich, Eugene, ed. (2010). The Biblical Qumran Scrolls: Transcriptions and Textual Variants. Brill.
- Würthwein, Ernst (1995). The Text of the Old Testament. Translated by Rhodes, Erroll F. Grand Rapids, MI: Wm. B. Eerdmans. ISBN 0-8028-0788-7.
