= Christians United for Israel =

American evangelical Zionist organization

- Christians United for Israel logo
- Abbreviation: CUFI
- Type: 501(c)(4) organization
- Tax ID no.: 46-1868892
- Purpose: Pro-Israel advocacy
- Headquarters: San Antonio, Texas
- National Chairman: John Hagee
- Subsidiaries: Daughters for Zion; CUFI on Campus
- Affiliations: CUFI Canada; CUFI UK
- Website: cufi.org

Christians United for Israel (CUFI; /ˈkuːfaɪ/) is an American evangelical organization that supports Israel. Its statement of purpose is "to provide a national association through which every pro-Israel church, parachurch organization, ministry or individual in America can speak and act with one voice in support of Israel in matters related to Biblical issues." As a Christian Zionist group with over 10 million members, it is the largest Zionist organization in the United States. It operates under the leadership of John Hagee as founder and chairman, along with Diana Hagee and Shari Dollinger as co-executive directors.

== History ==
"Christians United for Israel" was originally established in 1975 by David A. Lewis. Hagee called upon Christian leaders in America to join him in launching his new initiative. Over 400 pastors and ministry leaders, from various denominations and churches voiced support and Christians United for Israel was created. Hagee would legally incorporate the revived organization on February 7, 2006. Since its reorganization, it has operated out of San Antonio, Texas, where Hagee has long operated his own ministry.

The first college chapter of Christians United for Israel was established at California State University, Bakersfield. At the 2011 CUFI Washington Summit, it was reported that "CUFI on Campus" chapters had been formed or were in the process of formation on over 75 college campuses and CUFI was reported to have a presence on 225 campuses. As of November 2017, when CUFI Action Fund Chairwoman Sandra Hagee Parker testified before Congress during a hearing examining evidence of anti-Semitism on college campuses, CUFI on Campus reported 200 established chapters across the nation with an active presence on over 300 campuses. Parker testified that CUFI on Campus has trained over 3500 students since the campus program began in 2008.

In March 2012, the number of members passed one million, a milestone that meant CUFI was the largest US-based pro-Israel organization. By January 2015, the membership passed two million. As of December 2018, CUFI's membership had grown to over 5.1 million people.

In April 2018, the executive director position at CUFI changed hands for the first time since its founding. After founding Executive Director David Brog stepped down and took an alternate position as Director of Strategic Affairs for CUFI, the executive board chose two women to fill the position as Co-Executive Directors.

== Activities ==
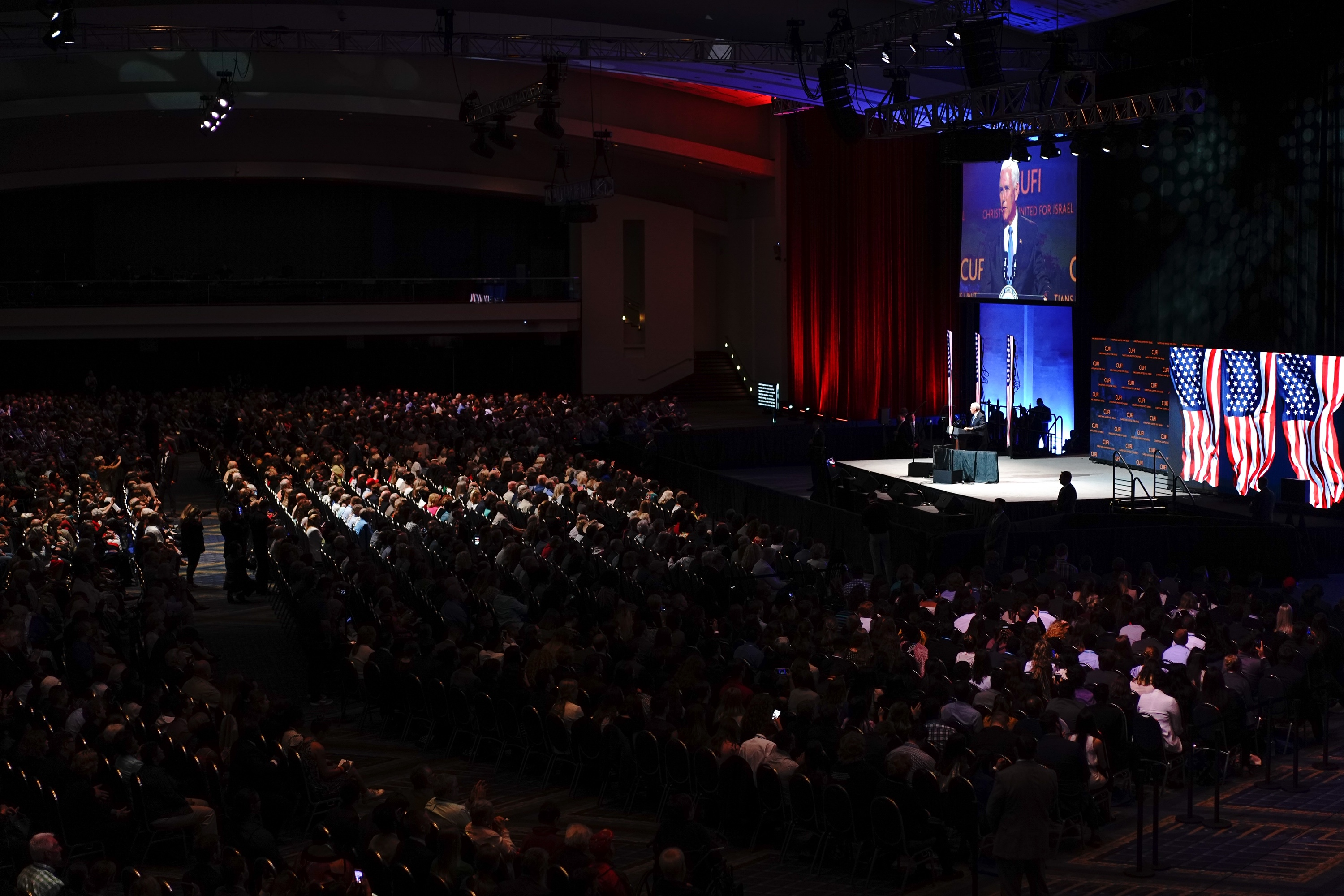
Mike Pence speaks at the 2019 Washington Summit

=== A Night to Honor Israel ===
CUFI hosts "Nights to Honor Israel" events in cities across the United States to express Christian solidarity with the State of Israel and the Jewish people. Such "Night to Honor Israel" events have often sought to include members of local Jewish communities. Funds raised are often given to the local Jewish federations to assist with efforts in Israel.

=== Washington/Israel Summit ===
CUFI holds an annual summit to enable delegates to personally speak with their representatives on behalf of Israel. On July 17, 2017, Vice President Mike Pence spoke to thousands of CUFI members at the annual CUFI Washington DC Summit's Night to Honor Israel ceremony.

=== National Night to Honor Israel 2008, 2009, 2010 ===
On July 22 CUFI held their 2008 National Night to Honor Israel. Ambassador Dan Gillerman, Pastor John Hagee and Senator Joseph Lieberman (I-Conn.) spoke with live music interludes. For the first time CUFI hosted several prominent Catholic leaders in a show of unity between Pastor Hagee and the Catholic Church. CUFI held an annual Washington Summit July 20–23, 2009. Israeli PM Netanyahu addressed the gathering by video conference at the Washington Summit in 2010.

=== Daughters for Zion ===
Daughters for Zion is a Christian prayer ministry that is part of the Christians United for Israel Organization (CUFI), a national association for every church, organization, christian ministry, or individual in the United States who wants to speak and act in support of the State of Israel. In August 2007, the CUFI organization implemented the Daughters for Zion association, whose mission is to organize a national network of prayer for Israel in every major city in the United States of America. These prayer groups can be implemented in the church, at home, in the office, or in any appropriate place for worship. The Daughters of Zion association was created under the leadership of the Protestant pastor John Hagee and the female pastor Lynn Hammond.

=== CUFI on Campus ===
The first university chapter of Christians United for Israel was established at the California State University, in Bakersfield, California, and was called CUFI on Campus. Plans were also made to create more similar chapters on other US campuses. In 2011 at the CUFI annual meeting in Washington, D.C., it was announced that several chapters of CUFI on Campus had been formed, and that new chapters were in the process of being formed on more than 75 campuses and that the CUFI organization was present on 225 campuses across the country.

=== CUFI Summit 2019 ===
Christians United for Israel hosted a summit on July 8, 2019 in Washington, D.C. The summit hosted the founder John Hagee, Israel's Prime Minister Benjamin Netanyahu, and US Vice President Mike Pence as speakers.

== Positions ==
At CUFI's 4th annual convention, CUFI Florida state director Scott Thomas, who is senior pastor at Without Walls Central in Lakeland, Florida, states that CUFI's support of Israel is not related to Christian eschatology (one of the features of dispensationalism, which holds that the modern state of Israel has a central role in bringing about the second coming of Jesus Christ) since Christians believe that there is nothing they can do to speed up that process. Thomas also cited Chapter 12 of Book of Genesis, which states that God will bless those who bless the Jews and curses those who curse the Jews, and said that his Christian faith could not exist without the foundation of Judaism. CUFI partners with Jewish interfaith organizations such as the Center for Jewish-Christian Understanding and Cooperation (CJCUC). CUFI has received criticism for its positions on Christian Zionism and end times theology by organizations such as the Middle East Council of Churches and theologians within the Anglican and Catholic Churches. J Street has also criticized CUFI's positions on the Israeli-Palestinian conflict, alleging their policies exacerbate tensions rather than fostering reconciliation. CUFI's founder, John Hagee, has also faced criticism for his claim that Adolf Hitler was fulfilling God's will by helping to return Jews to Israel as part of a divine plan. He later apologized for this statement. Hagee's statements emphasizing the exclusivity of Christianity for salvation have also raised concerns, particularly among interfaith organizations and Jewish leaders, who worry that CUFI's support for Israel may be linked to proselytizing efforts, despite the group's official stance against such activities.

In November 2012, the group filed a petition calling for Twitter and the US government to "ban Hamas from Twitter."

== Executive Board ==
- Pastor John Hagee, Founder and National Chairman, CUFI
- Pastor Scott Thomas, Free Life Chapel, CUFI Florida State Director
- Bishop Keith A Butler, Founder and Pastor, Word of Faith International Christian Center
- Pastor Happy Caldwell, Founder and Pastor Agape Church, Founder Victory Television Network
- Pastor Mac Hammond, Senior Pastor, Living Word Christian Center
- Michael Little, Principle Representative to Israel, the Christian Broadcasting Network
- Pastor George Morrison, Founder, Truth and Life Ministries

Prior to his death in 2007, Rev. Jerry Falwell sat on the Executive Board.

=== CUFI Canada ===
- Charles McVety, National Chairman
- Frank Dimant, CEO (2015–2019)

=== CUFI UK ===
CUFI UK was started in 2015.

== See also ==
- Anglican Friends of Israel
- Day to Praise
- Israel lobby in the United States
- Philo-Semitism
