= Apocalyptic beliefs among Latter-day Saints =

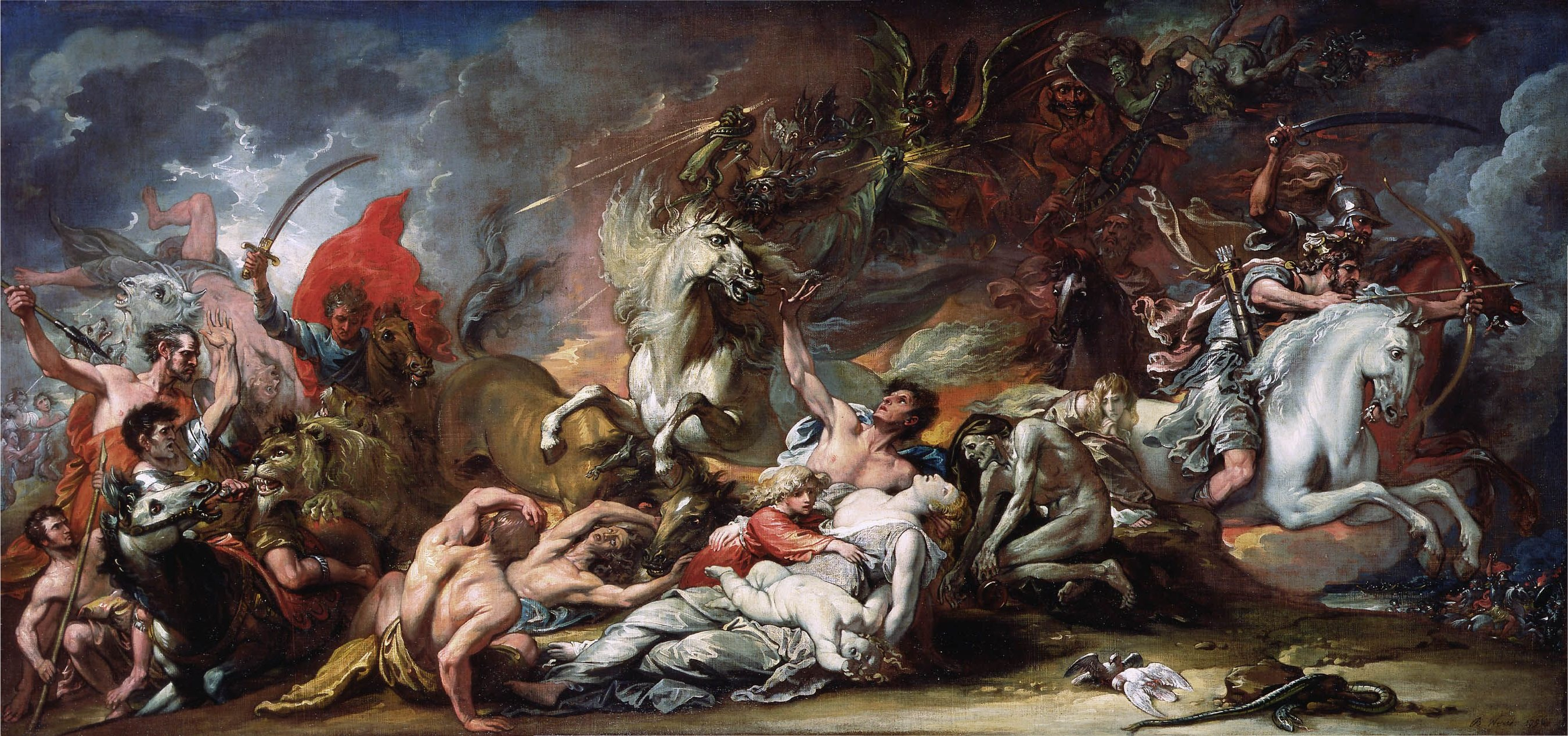
“The Latter-day Saints of the nineteenth century belonged to an apocalyptic tradition. Their very identity was entangled with the belief that society was headed toward cataclysmic events that would uproot the current social order in favor of a divine order that would be established in its place.”

The Church of Jesus Christ of Latter-day Saints and Church of Christ (Latter Day Saints) believe in the Second Coming of Jesus Christ. Preceding these events, members believe there will be a series of apocalyptic events that will prepare the earth for Christ's return. Some of these events align with scriptural prophecy while others originate from modern day and uncanonized revelation. These events have deep importance in the church, and members believe their role in them is crucial. By adequately studying religious text, adhering to the counsel from their leaders, and making necessary preparations, church members believe they will be ready for the imminent destruction to come.

== Apocalypticism ==
The word apocalypse is often correlated with Judaism and Christianity. The earliest literary records of apocalyptic ideologies are found in the Bible. There are four characteristics of an apocalypse that can be categorized and used to determine these beliefs. Throughout time, many different religious groups have possessed beliefs that align with these categories. Through the writings of the ancient prophets, current religions have been able to form apocalyptic beliefs about the Second Coming of Jesus Christ surrounding the prophecy of the text. The Church of Jesus Christ of Latter-day Saints is also one of these religious sects to hold similar beliefs. The categories are:

1. Righteous people will be vindicated, and the opposition will be vanquished.
2. An angel or heavenly messenger will disclose certain revelations regarding the event.
3. Ancient figures appear.
4. Ambiguous signs or objects will be presented that the general public will not understand, but the elect will.

Members of the Church of Jesus Christ of Latter-day Saints believe the righteous will be saved, religious figures will appear to reveal prophecy, and signs will be sent that the prepared members will recognize and respond to. These categories form the backbone of the Latter-day Saint apocalyptic beliefs.

== Apocalyptic beliefs in doctrine ==
Before Christ's second coming, members of the Church of Jesus Christ of Latter-day Saints believe there will be a period of destruction and death. The phrase "the last / latter days" refers to this period of time. Saints believe these will be "perilous times" filled with "great calamities". The following prophecies describe the church's doctrinal beliefs regarding this apocalyptic period from canonized scripture and modern apostolic words. Individual members of the Church have made predictions regarding when this will happen. However, no prediction with a specific date is recognized by Church leadership. While no credible leader claims to know the day, members believe that they will know the "season" of His coming. If members watch and prepare spiritually he will not come "as a thief in the night".

- Rain and hail
- Thunder and lightning
- Waves of sea beyond bounds
- Valleys uplifted and mountains lowered, earthquakes
- Mountains broken
- Sun darkens
- Blood, fire, and smoke vapors
- "Weeping and wailing" of men
- Wars and rumors of wars

Despite the prophesied destruction and calamities of the "last days", members of the Church of Jesus Christ of Latter-day Saints believe that they should not be afraid if they are prepared and righteous.

== Impact on US political history ==
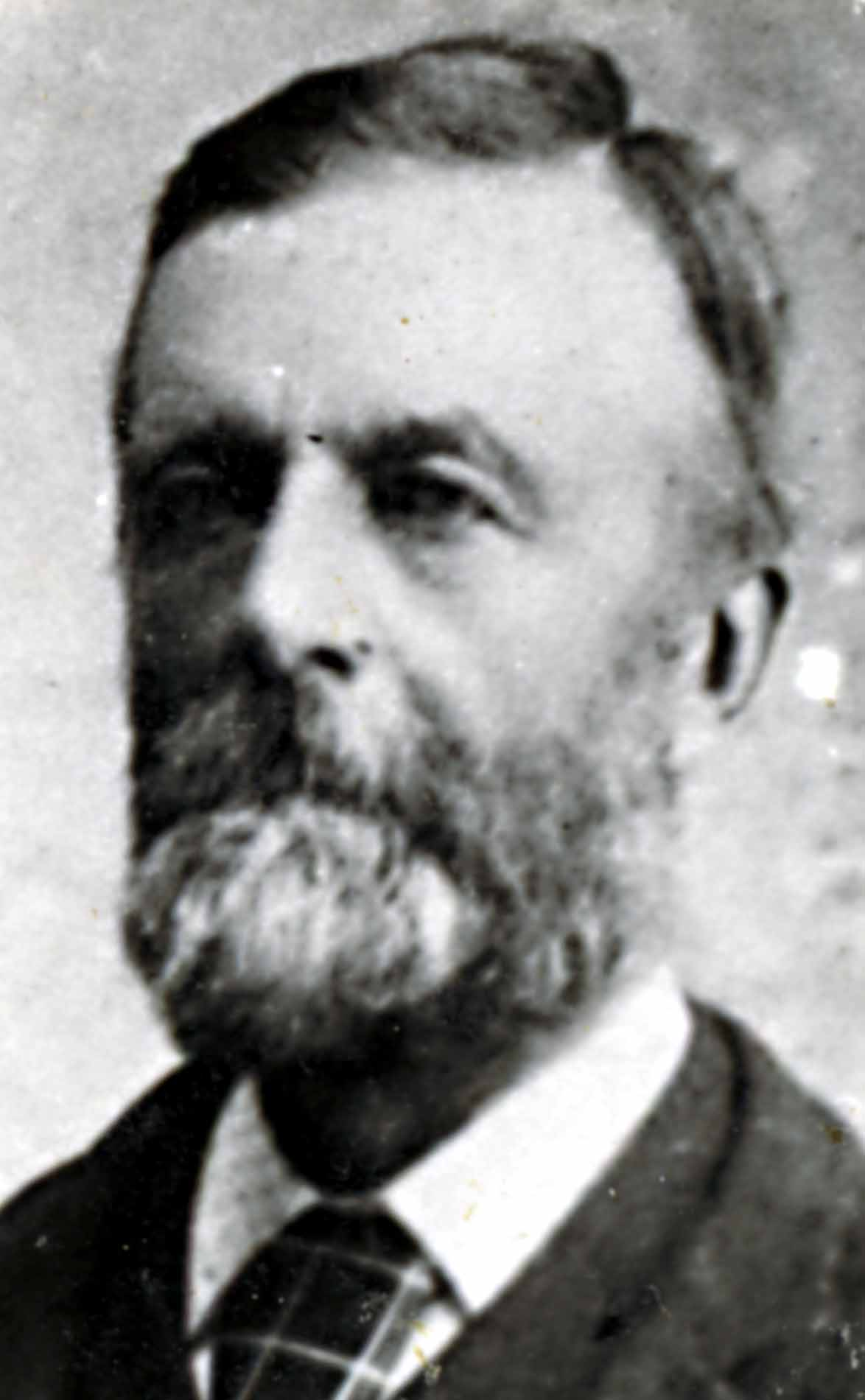
Edwin Rushton and Theodore Turley claimed Joseph Smith Jr. prophesied to them of the US and Latter-day Saint's futures concerning the "end of times". This prophecy, called the White Horse Prophecy, is not considered official LDS doctrine but has made a significant impact on their cultural outlooks and actions.

LDS church members' historical relationship with the US government has been complicated by their apocalyptic doctrines and prophecies. According to Latter-day Saint beliefs, Jesus Christ is prophesied to take his place as King, restoring peace just as the nation and government fall apart. Members anticipate events like war, sickness, and intense religious persecution prior to Christ's second coming. In the early years of the church there was "an outpouring of apocalyptic commentary" within LDS communities. These were often from uncanonized visions and prophecies, such as the White Horse Prophecy that warned that the US constitution will "hang by a thread" before Christ's second coming. With great persecution, disease, and death among the early LDS community, speculation of the rapid coming of “the last days'' and the government's degradation was soon popularized. These speculations became so influential because the saints had much anticipation for Christ to deliver them from their injustices. The great excitement surrounding the topic of apocalypse at the time, meant even ordinary individuals’ claimed visions were quickly circulated within the community. This caused some discrepancy between "official" church doctrine and LDS members' cultural beliefs and actions.

Dallin H. Oaks, an apostle of the Church of Jesus Christ of Latter-day Saints, commented that “in the first decade of the restored Church, its members on the western frontier were suffering private and public persecution. Partly, this was because of their opposition to the human slavery then existing in the United States.” American divisions over slavery diminished Saints’ trust in the US government. The LDS church and US government became even more tense because, despite appealing for government assistance, church members were not given aid during their religious persecution. This persecution included being threatened, killed, and pushed from their homes. Further, there was a Mormon extermination order issued in 1838. Other issues such as government restrictions on polygamy also created a greater wedge between the two groups, reinforcing Latter-day Saint ideas that signs of "wickedness" observed within the government meant "the last days" were upon them. Joseph Smith, the prophet of the church at the time stated, "Who is so big a fool as to cry, 'The law! The law!' when it is always administered against us and never in our favor?"

== Preparation ==
=== Physical ===
Latter-day Saints are well known for storing food and emergency supplies. Latter-day Saint leaders have instructed their members to prepare themselves such that they could survive without government aid. In studying the scriptures, members believe the earth will suffer famines like occurred in ancient times; they also believe imminent natural disasters will take place in the "last days", leaving them without access to basic necessities. It has been recommended that members store up to one year of food, water, and other supplies. Members often dedicate a room in their home for storing extra food and emergency supplies. Specific companies in Utah and Idaho are dedicated to providing food storage supplies for purchase.

Common food/supplies stored:

- wheat
- MREs
- hot chocolate packets
- powdered milk
- canned goods
- cheese powder
- powdered eggs
- peanut butter
- pasta
- sugar
- oats
- salt
- flashlights
- batteries
- money
- toilet paper
- gas
- first aid supplies
- deodorant
- tools
- candles
- water (water must be treated and stored in very specific ways to avoid contamination over long periods of time)

=== Intellectual ===
Latter-day Saints are constantly encouraged by their leaders to avoid debt and practice self-reliance. It lessens their reliance on outside sources, preparing them for the perilous days they believe to be ahead. The church offers self-reliance courses for their members to teach them how to accomplish this. Church leaders have taught to only accrue debt with a house payment, education loans, and a car. Members' obedience to this council is said to help them be more financially independent.

=== Spiritual ===
==== Recognizing signs ====
The Latter-day Saint faith finds great importance in the signs of the Second Coming. They believe that by being aware of the apocalyptic signs, they will be better aware of when the Second Coming will occur. While some members of the faith claim to have visions of the apocalyptic time before the Savior's return, most faithfully follow the advice and warnings of the prophets– believing them to receive direct guidance from God Himself.

Latter-day Saints are taught to know what the signs are and understand the timeline of events. A large part of their preparation is being adept in an understanding of the scriptures and being faithfully obedient. Members are constantly admonished by the scriptures and church leaders to “watch and be ready.” They are also taught from the Bible that even the elect members of the faith will be deceived. This deception can come by temptation, sin, or worldly affairs. With this prophecy looming overhead, members prioritize their obedience to the faith's standards, so they can ensure their fate at the Second Coming. They believe the righteous will be gathered into the presence of Jesus, and that He will bless them with exaltation. Latter-day Saints believe exaltation to be the purpose for life, and this possibility motivates much of what they do.

==== Gathering of Israel ====
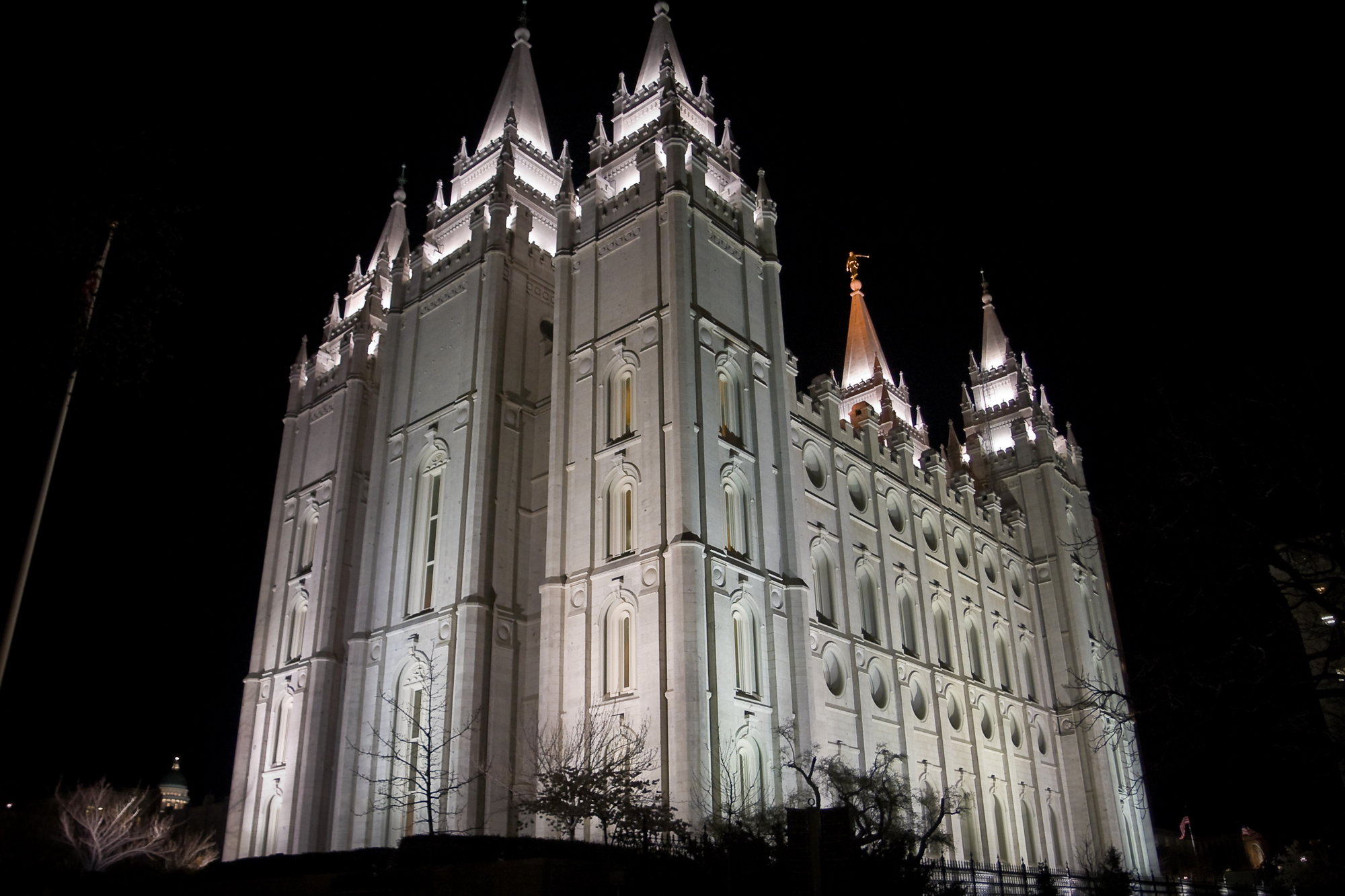
One of the LDS temples in which members can attend to prepare themselves and their family for the events of the apocalypse.

Members believe that as the apocalypse comes closer, they have a duty to share their religious message with others in the world. This is known within the faith as the prophecy of the Gathering of Israel. Russell M. Nelson, the current prophet, has been known to greatly emphasize this prophecy, and the benefits of fulfilling it in the "last days". Due to this, the church sends missionaries into the world to share their faith with others. Leaders also encourage members to be good examples in their communities and invite others to join them in their faith. Family genealogy and service done in LDS temples are other key practices in Gathering Israel. The church believes that by making these efforts, more people will be able to gain salvation while spiritually preparing themselves and their families for apocalyptic events.

== COVID-19 pandemic reactions ==
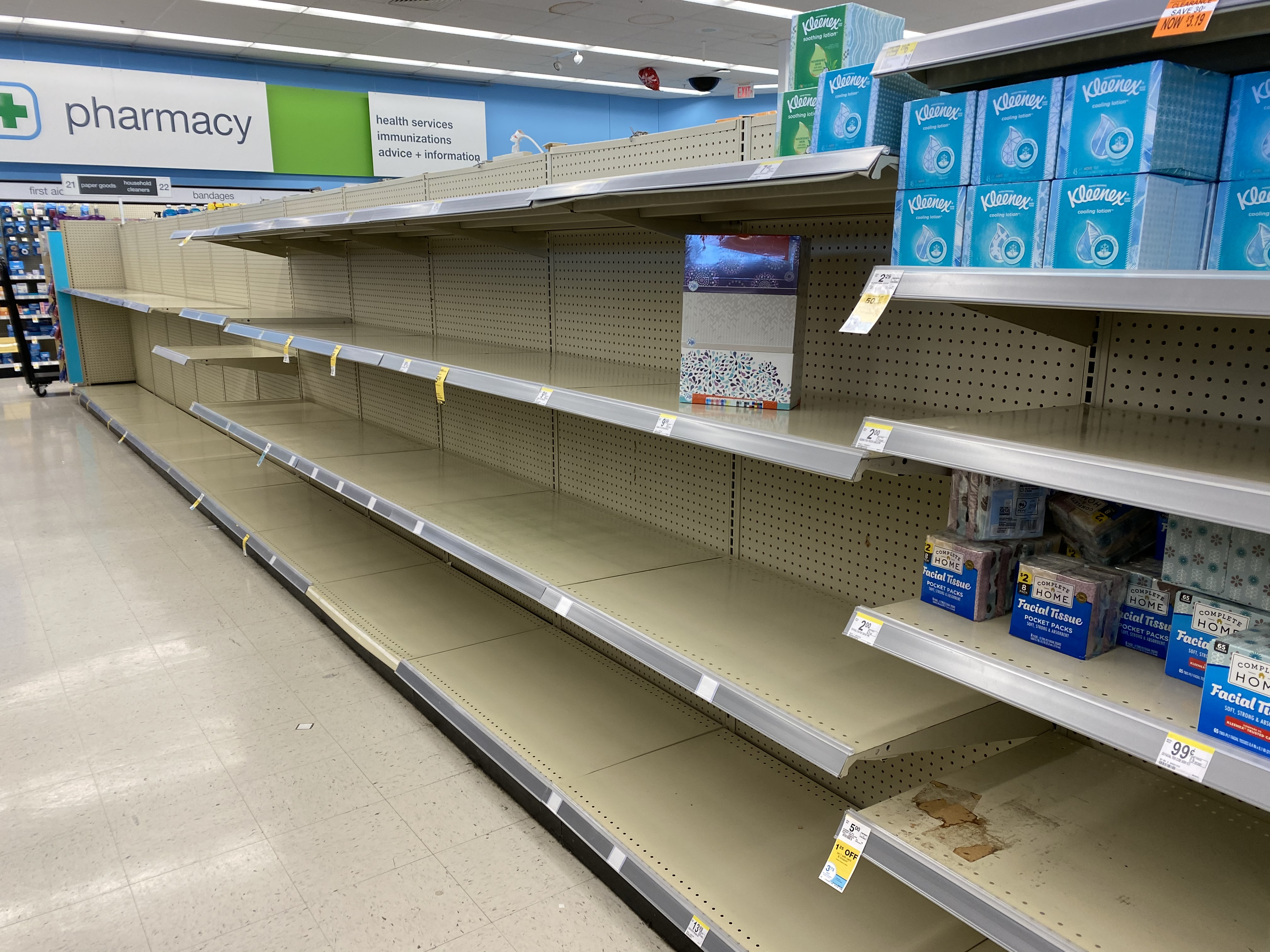
In the event of an apocalypse and supply shortage, Latter-day Saints store food in order to ensure their own personal health and safety.

The COVID-19 pandemic that began in the early months of 2020 created apocalyptic anxieties within Latter-day Saint communities. These events were especially concerning and impactful to church missionaries who were separated from their families or experiencing emergency evacuation from a foreign nation. Many Latter-day Saints relied on their emergency food and supply storage during the shortage.
