= Erik Johansson (artist) =

Swedish-born artist based in Prague (born 1985)

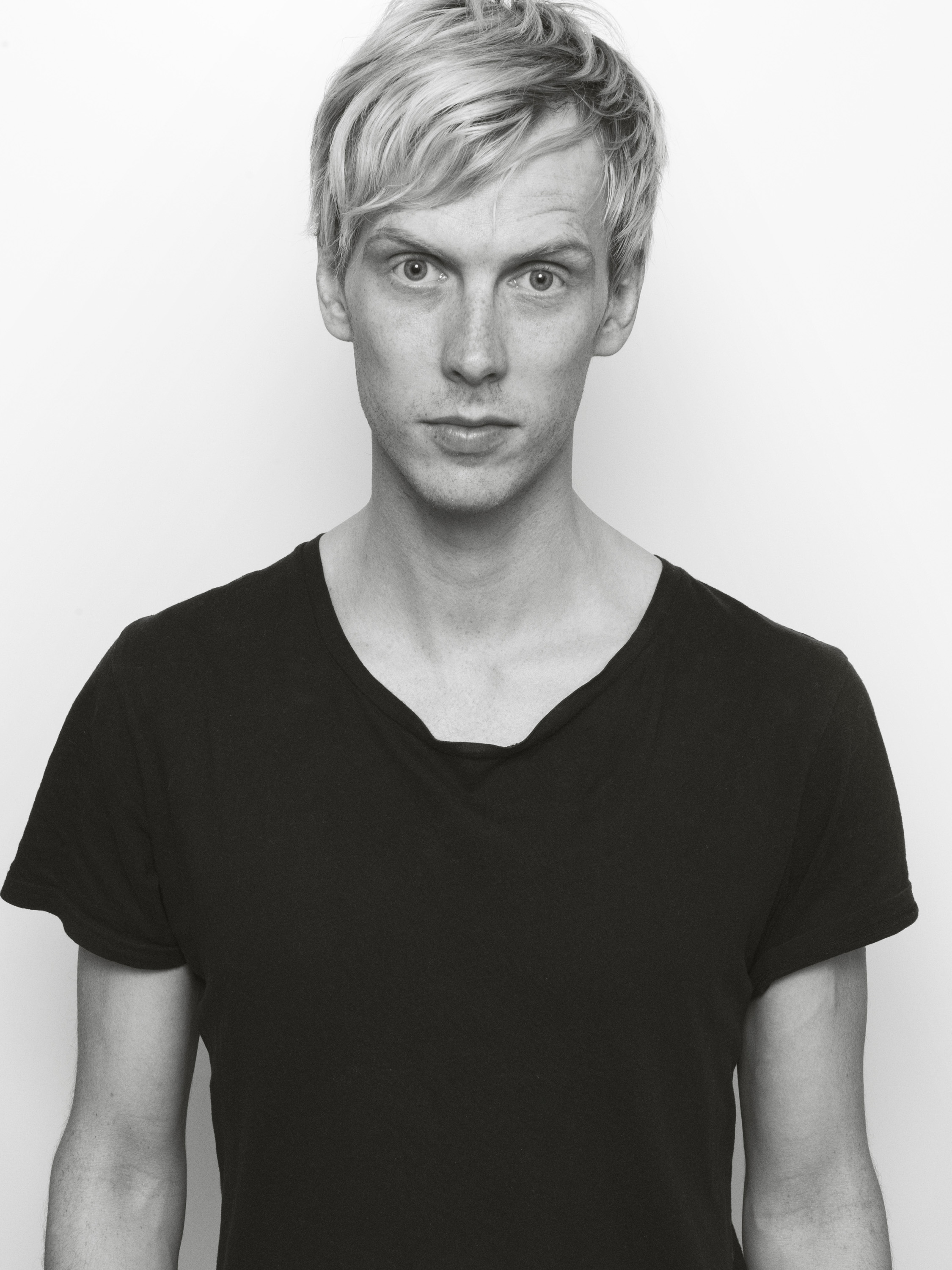
- Johansson in 2013
- Born: April 1985 (age 41); Götene, Sweden
- Education: Chalmers University of Technology
- Known for: Surrealist Photography
- Notable work: 'The Lightkeeper' (2018), 'Go Your Own Road' (2008), 'Arms break, vases don't' (2008)
- Website: ErikJohanssonPhoto.com

Erik Johansson (born April 1985) is a Swedish artist based in Prague who creates surreal images by combining photographic elements and other materials into surreal scenes. He combines images to create what looks like a real photograph, but creates logical inconsistencies to impart an effect of surrealism.

== Biography ==
Erik Johansson was born in April 1985 outside Götene in the rural middle-south of Sweden.

Johansson cites his interest in art as having been influenced by his upbringing, especially his grandmother who was a painter. He said that when his mother asked him how his days were at school, he would rather sketch a comic than tell her with words.

Early interest in computers came from Johansson's father who owned one for work in the mid 1980s, where Johansson would "escape to other worlds through computer games." His first digital camera was given to him when he was 15 years old. Johansson said that the camera opened up a whole new world to him, and made him wonder if pressing the trigger could just be the start of the artwork, rather than the final step.

In 2005, Johansson moved to Gothenburg to study Computer Engineering at Chalmers University of Technology. Here, Johansson began to experiment with retouching and photography, publishing some works online and receiving requests for retouching from local advertisement agencies.

He became self-employed when he moved to Norrköping in 2010 doing freelance work for advertisement agencies and began to receive international commission requests. In 2012 he moved permanently to Germany, living in Berlin for several years, then eventually deciding to move to the nearby Czech capital where he is currently based. Presently, Johansson works as a full-time photographer on personal and commissioned works. He also occasionally undertakes projects such as street retouch pranks or anamorphic illusion installations.

His creations have been defined by some critics as impossible photography.

== Artistic influences ==
Johansson takes major influence from the surrealist movement of the early 20th century for his photography. Inspired by a core belief of the surrealists that art should be created from the unconscious mind and project man into the reality of his dream, Johansson creates surreal scenes that invite viewers into a world unable to be captured in real time through a camera.

Johansson draws inspiration from a range of sources for his surrealist images, influenced by the world that surrounds him. At any time the environment he is working in, the music he is listening to or his mood can effect the final production of his work. The artist says that his birth country will always remain a reference point for his surrealist scenes. He notes that "Sweden will always have a special place in my work ... I like the roughness of it [The Northern European Landscape] and the way the light shapes the landscapes in summer and wintertime, giving them a special character." The artist avoids using recognisable landmarks that would place the scenes in the real world, instead using captured images to create a sense of place in an ambiguously far-away land.

Johansson also says that he gets inspiration more from painters than photographers. Some major artists he noted as key influences for his works include Salvador Dali, M.C Escher, René Magritte, Rob Gonsalves and Jacek Yerka.

== Creative process ==
Johansson undertakes an extensive creative process to realise and develop his final surrealist photographs.

His idea for an artwork stems from a simple thought, whether this be a basic idea he would like to capture or an aspect of an image he would like to create. The process begins with a simple sketch in order to map out the plan. Johansson says that planning his ideas is a lengthy process and can take months at a time. However, his biggest challenge he says is finding and locating all the elements he needs to photograph for his final work. Once these ideas are refined, the sketch develops into a clear image of the artists intentions and the process required to complete the final work.

The next stage in the process is the photography stage where Johansson photographs all the elements required for his surrealist scene. Every picture used to create the scenes is captured by Johansson himself who says that "it's more about having good material to work with. Photoshop is just where I put the pieces [photographs] of the puzzle together". The artist finds the limitation of only using images he can photograph a tool for narrowing his vision, as he can only photograph the places he physically can access.

Johansson uses a Hasselblad H5D-40 camera and a 35–90mm lens to capture each image. When photographing the images, the artist takes into account the lighting and perspective of the pictures in order to ensure they can be matched together realistically in the final work. The artist insists that the realism created in his imaginative works can only be captured by shooting his material on camera.

The post-production stage includes the use of image manipulation software such as Photoshop in order to alter the image digitally and create the idea. It is this manipulation that elevates the photographic elements, transcending reality and gaining access to a realm that exists beyond the immediate. Some finished images are the combination of "hundreds of original photographs" as well as raw materials, and Johansson spends dozens of hours using image manipulation software such as Adobe Photoshop to alter the image digitally and to illustrate his idea.

Recently, Johansson has been creating images from built sets with the addition of image manipulation. An example of this is his work "Full Moon Service". An original image was taken and then edited to replace the sky and apply moon texture to lamps that had stood in as moons. Here, Johansson combined 5–10 photos, whilst other works that are completely fabricated can use hundreds of parts.

=== Commissioned works ===
Johansson also undertakes a range of commissioned projects. The artist notes that bringing someone else's idea to life is a challenge.

Johansson sometimes incorporates stock imagery into commissioned works when the client's budget or timeframes are not flexible enough to allow for him to photograph every element of the agreed work. The client generally casts the models to be featured in the artworks. Johansson prefers the models to look "normal" to provide a juxtaposition to their surreal and sensational surroundings. One of Johansson's regular clients are Adobe who has provided his "paintbrush" of choice for 16 years in Photoshop. Other clients include Volvo, Toyota, Google, Microsoft and National Geographic.

== Artworks and projects ==
Erik Johansson combines his digitised photographs in the final image. Johansson separates the photographic elements from their familiar environments and recasts them in a shocking yet harmonious composition, concealing the seams between the images and blurring the boundary between imagination and reality.

Significant artworks by Erik Johansson include:

- The Light Keeper (2018)
- Go Your Own Road (2008)
- Electric Guitar (2012)
- Landfall (2014)
- All Above the Sky (2017)
- Lifetime (2017)
- Self-Supporting (2017)
- Loyal Mail (2017)
- Arms Break, Vases Don't (2008)

Johansson has published two books. Imagine was published in 2016 by Bokförlaget Max Ström and Places Beyond was released in 2019 by the same publisher. The books contain images of Johansson's photographs as well as unpublished works and process material.

The artist has also as released two NFTs (Non-Fungible Tokens), "Go Your Own Road" and "Head in the Clouds".

== Critical response ==
Critical response to Johansson's work has been positive.

Reporter Robert Krulwich wrote that Johansson creates a "meticulous fantasy" which is "part photograph, part construction, part drawing" with "so many layers of foolery in his images, you can't pull the illusion apart, it fits together so perfectly."

Alicia Eler, visual arts journalist and critic, wrote in the Star Tribune in 2019 that Johansson creates large scale and highly detailed photographs. When describing his image "Breaking up" (2015), Eler said that the composition and split-house in the work was a "clever device to explore the emotional experience of a domestic space broken apart."

She also said that despite Johansson's creative vision for his works, they still have a 'commercial sensibility', especially in works such as "A Leap of Faith".

== Exhibitions ==
Date	Exhibition Title	Gallery/Location	
2023, 21 September - 13 January 2024	The Echo Chamber	Fotografiska Stockholm	(solo exhibition)
2023, 11 May – 24 September	Make Believe	Abecita Pop art & Photo, Borås Sweden	(solo exhibition)
2022, 2 July – 21 August	Head in the Clouds	Magasinet Falun, Falun Sweden	(solo exhibition)
2022, 18 February – 24 April	Ideas come at Night	Institut suédois, 11 Rue Pavenee, Paris, France	(solo exhibition)
2021–22 – 16 September 2021 – 30 October 2022	Beyond Imagination	63 Building, 60th Floor, Seoul, South Korea	(solo exhibition)
2022 – September		Erarta Museum of Contemporary Art, St Petersburg Russia	Cancelled. Artists page reads "Glory to Ukraine."
2021–22, 10 October – 20 March	UnMöglich?	Was Wünsche leisten können, Zürich, Switzerland	(group exhibition)
2021, 27 March – 7 November	Behind the Horizon	Kalmar Castle, Kalmar, Sweden	(solo exhibition)
2021, 12 June – 24 October	Places Beyond	Kuntsi Museum of Modern Art, Vasa, Finland	(solo exhibition)
2021, 9–17 October	Beyond Reality	Home Expo, Luxembourg City, Luxembourg	(group exhibition)
2021, 1 June – 30 September	The La Gacilly Photo Festival	La Gacilly, Brittany, France	group exhibition)
2020, 25 September – 14 February 2021	Places Beyond	Fotografiska Tallinn, Estonia	(solo exhibition)
2020, 2 January – 29 March		Seongnam Arts Center Museum, Seongnam, South Korea	(solo exhibition)
2019, 4 December – 14 March, 2020	Places Beyond	Fotografiska Stockholm, Sweden	(solo exhibition)
2019, 18 October – 29 December		Hyundai Arts Center, Ulsan, South Korea	(solo exhibition)
2019, 17 September – 16 November		Place Sainte-Croix, Nantes, France	(solo exhibition)
2019, 5 June – 15 September		Seoul Art Centre, Seoul, South Korea	(solo exhibition)
2019, 14 February – 12 May	On the other side of Reality	Lumiere Brothers Centre of Photography, Moscow, Russia	(solo exhibition)
2019, 26 January – 28 April	IMAGINE	Swedish American Institute, Minneapolis, US	(solo exhibition)
2018, 3 December – 31 January	Scandinavian Photo	Vasagatan 14, Stockholm, Sweden	(solo exhibition)
2017–18, 19 September – 11 March	Nature Illusions	Naturhistoriska Riksmuseet, Stockholm, Sweden	(solo exhibition)
2017, 22–25 November	Mind Beyond	XPOSURE, Sharjah, United Arab Emirates	(group exhibition)
2017, 17 June – 8 October	Bending Reality	Dunkers Kulturhus, Helsingborg, Sweden	(solo exhibition)
2017, 28 July – 5 August	IMAGINE	Summer Film School, Uherské Hradiště, Czech Republic	(group exhibition)
2016, 4 June – 18 September	IMAGINE	Västergötlands Museum, Skara, Sweden	(solo exhibition)
2016, 30 April – 8 May	Impossible	Head On Festival, Sydney, Australia	(group exhibition)
2016, 25 February – 9 April	Imagine: Created Reality	Fotografiska Stockholm, Sweden	(solo exhibition)

=== Awards ===
Erik Johansson was awarded "Nature Photographer of 2015" in June 2016 from the Swedish Environmental Protection Agency. However, there was controversy surrounding the award as some people believed Johansson was not deserving as he is a photoshop artist. In response, Johansson said that the biggest misconception with his work is that it is only created in the computer, when in reality photographs are the elements that he joins together.

In response to criticism, Johansson donated the entire prize money of 25,000 SEK to the Swedish Cancer Society.
