= Timothée Chaillou =

French art curator

Timothée Chaillou (French pronunciation: [timɔte ʃaju]) is a French art curator, art critic and historian of art.

== Biography ==
Timothée Chaillou is a graduate of ICART, of Paris III, of Paris VII and of the City University of New York. He was a student of Vito Acconci, Jacques Aumont, Nicolas Bourriaud, Jean-Luc Chalumeau and Pierre Zaoui.

He is a member of AICA (International Association of Art Critics), IKT (International Association of Curators of Contemporary Art) and CEA (Commissaires d'Exposition Associés).

His exhibition reviews, essays and conversations have appeared in many catalogues, monographs and art magazines. He contributes to 20/27, Art Présence Artpress, ArtUS, Double Magazine, Dossier Journal, ETC, Flash Art International, Frieze, Hart, L'art même, L'Officiel Art, Numéro, Paddle8 and The White Review. He was the guest editor-in-chief of Annual Magazine No. 5 in 2012.

He's an art consultant for collectors, institutions (galleries and museums), companies and luxury brands.

He is a lecturer and teaches exhibition history and curating practices at IESA (Institut d’Études Supérieures d'Art) and at ICART (Institut supérieur des Carrières Artistiques, Paris).

== Curatorial projects ==
2013

- Zelda Zonk, Préface Gallery, Paris

with Lucy & Dave Ching, Henry Codax, Bernadette Corporation, franckDavid, Alejandro Juarez, Ayako Kiyosawa, Jules Marquis, Otto Mennings, Paul Owens, Galeria Perdida, Mai-Thu Perret, Sean Ryback, Ray Sander, Shanaynay, Reena Spaulings, Abie Trevor, Dorothy Vallens, Parker Williams and Donnelle Woolford

- Davide Balliano – No Flock For Blind Shepherds, Rolando Anselmi gallery, Berlin
- Cérémonie, Melinda Gloss, for the Parcours Saint-Germain, Paris

with Davide Balliano, Don Brown, John Giorno, Lothar Hempel, Ange Leccia, Claude Lévêque, Justin Morin, Loïc Raguénès, Ida Tursic & Wilfried Mille, Marnie Weber

- Fragrance, Garagisme, Paris

with John M. Armleder, Anne Collier, Alex Israel, Ange Leccia, Josephine Meckseper, Olivier Mosset, Mai-Thu Perret, Loïc Raguénès, Jeffrey Schad, Vincent Szarek

- Only parts of us will ever touch parts of others, Galerie Thaddaeus Ropac, Paris

with John M Armleder, Jesse Ash, Walead Beshty, Pierre Bismuth, Barbara Breitenfellner, Tom Burr, Anne Collier, Sam Durant, Marcel Dzama, Haris Epaminonda, Angus Fairhurst, Urs Fischer, Brendan Fowler, Luke Fowler, Noa Giniger, Wade Guyton, Robert Heinecken, Camille Henrot, Nathan Hylden, Annette Kelm, Gabriel Kuri, Elad Lassry, Claude Lévêque, Linder, Mathieu Mercier, Jonathan Monk, Sarah Morris, Richard Prince, Collier Schorr, John Stezaker, Catherine Sullivan, Kelley Walker, Gary Webb, Lawrence Weiner, TJ Wilcox, Cerith Wyn Evans

2012

- Vincent Olinet – Un 178 juillet, Palais de Tokyo, Paris
- Morgane Tschiember – Dripping Printing, Colette, Paris
- Group show, Annual Limited Editions, FIAC, Paris

with Tom Burr, Nicolas Giraud, David Malek, Jonathan Monk, Pavlos, Michael Riedel, Vittorio Santoro, John Stezaker, Blair Thurman, Morgane Tschiember, Ida Tursic & Wilfried Mille, Lawrence Weiner

- No color in your cheeks unless the wind lashes your face, It's Our Playground, Glasgow

with Alejandro Almanza Pereda, Kathryn Andrews, Hany Armanious, Fayçal Baghriche, Davide Balliano, Guillaume Bijl, Bill Bollinger, Shary Boyle, Christoph Büchel, Lizzi Bougatsos, Barbara Breitenfellner, Nina Canell, Nina Childress, Anne Collier, Claudia Comte, Susan Collis, Heather Cook, Sean Dack, Michael Dean, Emilie Ding, Ayse Erkmen, Roe Ethridge, Angus Fairhurst, Peter Friedl, Ximena Garrido-Lecca, Francesco Gennari, Noa Giniger, Steven Gontarski, Gerald Hayes, Martijn Hendriks, Kent Henricksen, Julian Hoeber, Nathan Hylden, Bruno Jakob, Philippe Jarrigeon, Jacob Kassay, Ian Kiaer, Josh Kolbo, Roland Kollnitz, Andrei Koschmieder, Laurent Kropf, Andrew Kuo, Elad Lassry, Crisina Lei Rodriguez, Klara Liden, David Lieske, Trevor Lloyd, Justin Lowe, David Malek, Taylor McKimens, Ryan McLaughlin, John Miller, Stefan Muller, Martin Oppel, Laura Owens, Paul Owens, Stephen Prina, Chloé Quenum, Amanda Ross-Ho, Vittorio Santoro, Shirana Shahbazi, Steven Shearer, Lewis Stein, Beat Streuli, Cheyney Thompson, Remco Torenbosch, Niele Toroni, Frances Trombly, Ned Vena, Klaus Winichner, Jordan Wolfson, Bobbi Woods

2019

- In 2019, Yundler Brondino Verlag published a book showcasing the work by artist, Guy Yanai which includes conversation and interview held by Chaillou.

== Bibliography ==
’'Editor'’

- Cérémonie, publication editor, published by Melinda Gloss, 2014
- Only parts of us will ever touch parts of others, publication editor, with essays by Thomas Clerc, Boris Groys, John Miller and a portfolio by Pierre Even, published by Galerie Thaddaeus Ropac, 2013, ISBN 978-2-910055-52-3

’'Books'’

- Claude Lévêque, Je suis venu ici pour me cacher, essay about Claude Lévêque and conversation with Paul-Emmanuel Reiffers and Kamel Mennour, published by Mazarine and kamel mennour, 2013
- WYSIWYG: What You(ngs) See Is What You Get, catalog's essay, published by Rosenblum Collection & friends, 2012, ISBN 978-2-9539968-1-4

’'Collective books'’

- ‘'Art et Architecture – Collection FRAC Centre'’, essay about Pierre Bismuth, published by HYX Editions, 2014, ISBN 978-2-910385-72-9
- Claude Lévêque – Seasons in the Abyss, conversation with Claude Lévêque, published by Manuella Editions, 2014, ISBN 978-2-917217-43-6
- A bras le corps, conversation with Claude Lévêque, published by Les Presses du réel, 2014, ISBN 978-2-84066-510-6
- MUMO – Le Musée Mobile, essay about Claude Lévêque, published by Les Presses du réel, 2013, ISBN 978-2-84066-586-1
- Open Airs, conversation with Timothée Chaillou by Cécilia Bezzan, published by Yellow Now Publishing, collective book, 2011, ISBN 978-2-87340-313-3
- 100 artistes du street art, essays about Julio 204, Loomit, Barry McGee, Reach and Sixeart, published by Éditions de La Martinière, 2011, ISBN 978-2-7324-4581-6
- Aux Tuileries – FIAC, essay about Claude Lévêque, published by Éditions Dilecta, 2011, ISBN 978-2-916275-98-7
- sommes-nous l'élégance, conversation between Timothée Chaillou, Bruno Dumont and Didier Marcel, published by Paris Musées – Musée d'Art Moderne de la Ville de Paris, 2010, ISBN 978-2-7596-0144-8
- Casanova Forever, conversation with Claude Lévêque, published by Editions Dilecta, collective book, 2010, ISBN 978-2-916275-72-7

== Conferences ==
- La nuit du savoir – Christophe Honoré et Claude Lévêque, conversation with Christophe Honoré and Claude Lévêque, Institut Culturel Bernard Magrez, 2014
- Photography, painting, limits?, conversation with Jean-Marc Bustamante, Karel Funk and Patrick Tosani, Paris Photo Platform, 2014
- From desert to collage, from altered landscape to modified images, Le Bal 2013
- The angel of history, curator : Nicolas Bourriaud, École des Beaux-Arts de Paris, 2013
- Dylan Lynch, The Still House, New York, 2013
- Sylvie Fanchon : SF à Dôle, Musée des Beaux-Arts de Dole, 2013
- Claude Lévêque : Nevers let love in, Artcurial, 2012

=== See also ===
- Contemporary art
- Art criticism
