= List of Radiolab episodes =

Radiolab is a radio program broadcast on public radio stations in the United States and through a podcast available internationally, both produced by WNYC. Hosted by Latif Nasser and Lulu Miller, each episode delves into scientific and philosophical topics through stories, interviews, and thought experiments.

Radiolab airs as a one-hour broadcast each week while its podcast releases new episodes of varying lengths usually biweekly. For a few years, the Radiolab podcast feed featured a full-hour episode every six weeks, announced by the hosts as Radiolab: The Podcast, interspersed with two shorter pieces known as "shorts." These shorter pieces were often combined into full episodes not found on the podcast feed but available on Radiolab's website. Recently, Radiolab has diversified its podcast format, combining these episodes and shorts into an airable compilation. The program is syndicated to over 450 NPR affiliates nationwide.

Radiolab's first nine seasons (February 2002–April 2011) comprised five episodes each. Subsequent seasons contained between nine and ten episodes. Season 15 began airing in January 2017. In 2018, the show's seasonal and episode format became obscured when online content moved from radiolab.org to wnycstudios.org.

== Before Season 1 (2002–2004) ==
Before the concept of a show featuring Jad Abumrad and Robert Krulwich emerged in November 2003, Abumrad produced radio documentaries featuring himself and others. Some of this material has been repackaged and broadcast under the Radiolab banner.

No. in season	Title	Original release date
2002
1	"Death Penalty and the Prison Economy"	May 19, 2002
2	"Graduation and Memorial Day"	May 26, 2002
3	"Why does the Arab world hate us?"	June 2, 2002
4	"How much do most of us really know about Africa?"	June 9, 2002
5	"South Africa"	June 16, 2002
6	"Terrorism and Fundamentalism"	June 23, 2002
7	"An Unusual Look at the Middle East"	June 30, 2002
8	"Adventures in the Other America"	July 7, 2002
9	"Pop Songs, Strip Clubs, and Commercials"	July 14, 2002
10	"Home, Fast Food and Screamologists"	July 21, 2002
11	"Religion in America"	July 28, 2002
12	"Bible Salesmen, Snake Handlers and Deadly Decisions"	August 4, 2002
13	"NY Screamers, Turkish Youth and Improv Comedians"	August 11, 2002
14	"The World in Sound"	August 18, 2002
15	"Margins of the Musical Spectrum"	August 25, 2002
16	"Retrospection"	September 1, 2002
17	"Pre-Disaster, the Aftermath and Spiritual Fallout"	September 8, 2002
18	"Atonement, Quilting and Knitting and the History of Rhythm 'n Blues"	September 15, 2002
19	"Teen Diaries, Whose Line Is It Anyway and Rhythm N Blues"	September 22, 2002
20	"The Many Faces of Glenn Gould"	September 29, 2002
21	"Wanderers, Rwanda Maps and Rhythm n Blues"	October 6, 2002
22	"Travelers Logs, Soundscapes and the History of Rhythm n Blues"	October 13, 2002
23	"Food for Thought"	October 20, 2002
24	"Therapy, Martian Invasion and More Rhythm n Blues"	October 27, 2002
25	"Race Relations, The Power of Pop and the History of Rhythm n Blues"	November 3, 2002
26	"Veteran's Day Special"	November 10, 2002
27	"Revolt"	November 17, 2002
28	"Nike, Nature's Revenge and Gunrunners"	November 24, 2002
29	"Rwanda Maps"	December 8, 2002
30	"Family Feuds Over the Lord"	December 22, 2002
31	"An Hour With George Avakian"	December 29, 2002
2003
1	"Migrants and Wanderers"	January 5, 2003
2	"Therapy/Therapeutic Resistance"	January 12, 2003
3	"Nike: Not Just a Shoe Company"	January 19, 2003
Compiled from "Nike, Nature's Revenge and Gunrunners" (Nov 2002).
4	"Shades of Gray"	January 26, 2003
5	"War"	February 2, 2003
6	"What's so Funny?"	February 9, 2003
7	"Strip Club USA"	February 16, 2003
8	"Needlework"	February 23, 2003
9	"Dog Tales"	March 2, 2003
10	"Radio Diaries"	March 9, 2003
11	"Bridges"	March 16, 2003
12	"Jay's Kids and Kids on Spirituality"	March 30, 2003
13	"Educating Esme"	April 6, 2003
14	"Word Musicians"	April 13, 2003
15	"Memories"	April 20, 2003
16	"Memory 2"	April 27, 2003
17	"Food Therapy"	May 4, 2003
18	"Native vs. Tourist"	May 18, 2003
19	"The 'Stans'"	May 25, 2003
20	"The Perfect Picture"	June 1, 2003
21	"Scenes from a Transplant"	June 8, 2003
22	"The Listening Room"	June 22, 2003
23	"Lost at Sea"	June 29, 2003
24	"Networks & Neighborhoods"	July 13, 2003
25	"Noise Pollution vs Silence"	July 20, 2003
26	"The Radio Lab Fundraising Special"	October 17, 2003
27	"Look out...Martians!"	October 31, 2003
28	"Selling"	November 7, 2003
29	"Undercover in Zimbabwe"	November 21, 2003
30	"Trenches"	December 12, 2003
Released on the eve of the 2003 invasion of Iraq, "Trenches" compiled three archival stories about Americans at war: The first takes a listen to tape recordings from 1966 made by an American soldier who was killed in action in Vietnam; The second excerpts 1989 interviews with African American soldiers who dealt with racism, both in Vietnam and at home in the United States; The third story strings together audio clips from the Pacific Northwest in 1991 during first U.S. Gulf War with Iraq.
31	"Flight (Species Envy)"	December 19, 2003
32	"Remember"	December 26, 2003
2004
1	"Contact"	January 16, 2004
2	"The Ring and I"	March 2, 2004
3	"Time"	June 4, 2004
4	"Space"	June 25, 2004

== Season 1 (2005) ==
No. in season	Title	Original release date
1	"Who Am I?"	February 4, 2005
2	"Stress"	February 11, 2005
3	"Emergence"	February 18, 2005
4	"Time"	February 25, 2005
5	"Beyond Time"	March 4, 2005

== Season 2 (2006) ==
No. in season	Title	Original release date
1	"Detective Stories"	April 14, 2006
2	"Musical Language"	April 21, 2006
3	"Morality"	April 28, 2006
4	"Where Am I?"	May 5, 2006
Guests: Oliver Sacks, Robert Sapolsky, Jonah Lehrer, Antonio Damasio, Christopher Sayles, Steven Solomon, Dr. V.S. Ramachandran, Jonathan Cole, Ian Waterman, Paul Broks, Dan Fulgham, Jim Whinnery, Tim Sestak.
5	"Space"	May 12, 2006

== Season 3 (2007) ==
No. in season	Title	Original release date
1	"Placebo"	May 18, 2007
2	"Sleep"	May 25, 2007
3	"Zoos"	June 1, 2007
4	"Memory and Forgetting"	June 7, 2007
5	"Mortality"	June 15, 2007
Episodes during Season 3 and before Season 4 (2007–2008)
1	"This is Your Brain On Love"	August 28, 2007
2	"Making Radiolab"	November 6, 2007
3	"Space Capsules"	November 20, 2007
4	"The Wright Brothers"	December 18, 2007
5	"Zoo Keeper's Dilemma"	January 15, 2008
6	"Salle Des Departs"	January 29, 2008
7	"Our Podcast comes in all shapes and sizes"	February 11, 2008

== Season 4 (2008) ==
No. in season	Title	Original release date
1	"Laughter"	February 22, 2008
2	"Deception"	February 29, 2008
3	"War of the Worlds"	March 7, 2008
4	"(So-Called) Life"	March 14, 2008
5	"Pop Music"	March 21, 2008
Episodes during Season 4 and before Season 5 (2008)
1	"Jad and Robert: The Early Years"	May 6, 2008
2	"Open Outcry"	May 20, 2008
3	"Wordless Music"	June 3, 2008
4	"Earworms"	June 17, 2008
5	"City X"	July 1, 2008
6	"Tell Me A Story"	July 29, 2008
Robert Krulwich's commencement speech at Caltech.
7	"The (Multi) Universe(s)"	August 12, 2008
8	"Quantum Cello"	August 25, 2008
9	"Making the Hippo Dance"	September 9, 2008
10	"Chasing Bugs"	September 23, 2008
An interview with E. O. Wilson.
11	"Sperm Tales"	October 7, 2008
12	"Chris And Lisa"	October 21, 2008

== Season 5 (2008) ==
No. in season	Title	Original release date
1	"Choice"	November 14, 2008
2	"Sperm"	November 21, 2008
3	"Race"	November 28, 2008
4	"Diagnosis"	December 5, 2008
5	"Yellow Fluff and Other Curious Encounters"	December 12, 2008
Episodes during Season 5 and before Season 6 (2009)
1	"Parabolas (etc.)"	January 13, 2009
2	"The Obama Effect, Perhaps."	January 27, 2009
3	"Darwinvaganza"	February 24, 2009
4	"Mischel’s Marshmallows"	March 9, 2009
5	"DIY Universe"	March 25, 2009
6	"In Silence"	April 7, 2009
7	"Juana Molina"	May 4, 2009
8	"AV Smackdown . . . The Podcast"	May 18, 2009
9	"Stayin' Alive"	June 2, 2009

== Season 6 (2009) ==
No. in season	Title	Original release date
1	"Stochasticity"	June 15, 2009
2	"After Life"	July 27, 2009
3	"Parasites"	September 7, 2009
4	"New Normal?"	October 19, 2009
5	"Numbers"	November 30, 2009
Episodes during Season 6 and before Season 7 (2009)
1	"Stochasticity Bonus Video!"	June 15, 2009
2	"Are We Coins?"	June 29, 2009
3	"In Defense of Darwin?"	July 13, 2009
4	"12: Proof"	August 10, 2009
5	"13: Gone"	August 11, 2009
6	"14: The Four Groans"	August 12, 2009
7	"15: Sum"	August 13, 2009
8	"16: Moments"	August 14, 2009
9	"After Birth"	August 24, 2009
10	"It Might Be Science"	September 21, 2009
11	"Blink"	October 5, 2009
12	"Helicopter Boy"	November 3, 2009
13	"Killing Babies, Saving the World"	November 16, 2009
14	"In C"	December 14, 2009

== Season 7 (2010) ==
No. in season	Title	Original release date
1	"Animal Minds"	April 2, 2010
2	"Lucy"	April 9, 2010
3	"Limits"	April 16, 2010
4	"Famous Tumors"	May 7, 2010
5	"Who Are You?"	May 14, 2010
Episodes during Season 7 and before Season 8 (2010)
1	"Fu Manchu"	January 25, 2010
2	"The Shy Baboon"	February 8, 2010
3	"Do I Know You?"	March 8, 2010
4	"The Bus Stop"	March 23, 2010
5	"The Loudest Miniature Fuzz"	April 20, 2010
6	"Vanishing Words"	May 5, 2010
7	"Strangers in the Mirror"	June 15, 2010

== Season 8 (2010) ==
No. in season	Title	Original release date
1	"Oops"	September 3, 2010
2	"Words"	September 10, 2010
3	"Falling"	September 20, 2010
4	"Cities"	October 8, 2010
5	"Fate and Fortune"	October 15, 2010
Episodes during Season 8 and before Season 9 (2010)
1	"The Luckiest Lobster"	July 12, 2010
2	"Secrets of Success"	July 26, 2010
3	"Bonus Video: Words"	August 9, 2010
4	"Voices in Your Head"	September 7, 2010
5	"The Walls of Jericho"	October 4, 2010
6	"Wild Talk"	October 18, 2010
7	"What Does Technology Want?"	November 16, 2010
8	"Gravitational Anarchy"	November 29, 2010

== Season 9 (2010–2011) ==
No. in season	Title	Original release date
1	"The Good Show"	December 14, 2010
2	"Lost & Found"	January 25, 2011
3	"Help!"	March 8, 2011
4	"The Soul Patch"	April 1, 2011
5	"Desperately Seeking Symmetry"	April 18, 2011
Episodes during Season 9 and before Season 10 (2010–2011)
1	"Blood Buddies"	December 28, 2010
2	"The Universe Knows My Name"	January 11, 2011
3	"Radiolab Presents: The Loneliness of the Goalkeeper"	February 8, 2011
4	"A Flock of Two"	February 22, 2011
5	"Pass the Science"	March 22, 2011
6	"In the Running"	April 5, 2011
7	"Radiolab Video: Symmetry"	April 18, 2011
8	"Cosmic Habituation"	May 3, 2011
9	"Dogs Gone Wild"	May 17, 2011

== Season 10 (2011–2012) ==
No. in season	Title	Original release date
1	"Talking to Machines"	May 31, 2011
2	"Games"	August 23, 2011
3	"Loops"	October 4, 2011
4	"Patient Zero"	November 14, 2011
5	"The Bad Show"	January 9, 2012
6	"Escape!"	February 20, 2012
7	"Guts"	April 2, 2012
8	"Colors"	May 21, 2012
9	"When Brains Attack!"	June 22, 2012
10	"Ghost Stories"	June 29, 2012
Episodes during Season 10 and before Season 11 (2011–2012)
1	"A Clockwork Miracle"	June 14, 2011
2	"Curious Sounds: A Radiolab Concert"	June 27, 2011
3	"A 4-Track Mind"	July 26, 2011
4	"Damn It, Basal Ganglia"	August 9, 2011
5	"Mapping Tic Tac Toe-dom"	September 6, 2011
6	"Loop the Loop"	September 20, 2011
7	"Slow"	October 18, 2011
8	"Sleepless in South Sudan"	October 31, 2011
9	"Death Mask"	November 28, 2011
10	"Radiolab Presents: 99% Invisible"	December 12, 2011
11	"Mutant Rights"	December 22, 2011
12	"Wake Up and Dream"	January 23, 2012
13	"Killer Empathy"	February 6, 2012
14	"A War We Need"	March 5, 2012
15	"The Turing Problem"	March 19, 2012
16	"Crossroads"	April 16, 2012
17	"Fetal Consequences"	April 30, 2012
18	"Colors Sneak Peek"	May 14, 2012
19	"Grumpy Old Terrorists"	June 4, 2012
20	"Unraveling Bolero"	June 18, 2012
21	"Radiolab Remixed"	July 2, 2012
22	"Double Blasted"	July 16, 2012
23	"Argentine Invasion"	July 30, 2012
24	"Inside "Ouch!""	August 27, 2012
25	"What a Slinky Knows"	September 10, 2012

== Season 11 (2012–2013) ==
No. in season	Title	Original release date
1	"The Fact of the Matter"	September 24, 2012
2	"Inheritance"	November 19, 2012
3	"Bliss"	December 17, 2012
4	"Speed"	February 5, 2013
5	"Are You Sure?"	March 26, 2013
6	"23 Weeks 6 Days"	April 30, 2013
7	"Inner Voices"	June 27, 2013
8	"Known Unknowns"	August 29, 2013
9	"Of Men and Myths"	October 31, 2013
10	"The Power of Music"	November 28, 2013
Episodes during Season 11 and before Season 12 (2012–2013)
1	"Dark Side of the Earth"	October 8, 2012
2	"Seeing in the Dark"	October 22, 2012
3	"What's Up, Doc?"	November 6, 2012
4	"Raising Crane"	December 3, 2012
5	"Solid as a Rock"	December 31, 2012
6	"The Bitter End"	January 15, 2013
7	"Speedy Beet"	February 19, 2013
8	"The Man Behind the Maneuver"	March 5, 2013
9	"Radiolab Presents: TJ & Dave"	April 2, 2013
10	"The Distance of the Moon"	April 16, 2013
11	"The Septendecennial Sing-Along"	May 14, 2013
12	"VIDEO: Radiolab Behind the Scenes"	May 20, 2013
13	"Adoptive Couple v. Baby Girl"	May 30, 2013
14	"The Trouble with Everything"	June 13, 2013
15	"Curious Sounds from the Solid Sound Festival"	June 27, 2013
16	"Ally's Choice"	July 2, 2013
17	"Happy Birthday, Good Dr. Sacks"	July 9, 2013

== Season 12 (2013–2014) ==
No. in season	Title	Original release date
1	"Blood"	July 31, 2013
2	"Blame"	September 12, 2013
3	"Apocalyptical - Live from the Paramount in Seattle"	December 9, 2013
4	"Black Box"	January 17, 2014
5	"Dead Reckoning"	February 19, 2014
6	"What's Left When You're Right?"	February 25, 2014
7	"60 Words"	April 18, 2014
8	"Things"	May 30, 2014
9	"Galapagos"	July 17, 2014
10	"Hello"	August 21, 2014
Episodes during Season 12 and before Season 13 (2013–2014)
1	"Rodney Versus Death"	August 13, 2013
2	"Dawn of Midi"	August 29, 2013
3	"Poop Train"	September 24, 2013
4	"Quicksaaaand!"	October 10, 2013
5	"UPDATE: Famous Tumors"	October 22, 2013
6	"Cut and Run"	November 1, 2013
7	"An Ice-Cold Case"	November 19, 2013
8	"VIDEO: Radiolab Live Apocalyptical Sneak Peek"	December 9, 2013
9	"Sex, Ducks, and The Founding Feud"	December 19, 2013
10	"The Times They Are a-Changin'"	December 30, 2013
11	"Brown Box"	January 28, 2014
12	"Neither Confirm Nor Deny"	February 12, 2014
13	"Super Cool"	March 11, 2014
14	"KILL 'EM ALL"	March 25, 2014
15	"Straight Outta Chevy Chase"	April 1, 2014
16	"For the Love of Numbers"	May 2, 2014
17	"The Skull"	May 15, 2014
18	"≤ kg"	June 13, 2014
19	"9-Volt Nirvana"	June 26, 2014
20	"For the Birds"	July 24, 2014
21	"Happy Birthday Bobby K"	August 7, 2014
22	"In the Dust of this Planet"	September 8, 2014
23	"Juicervose"	September 18, 2014
24	"John Luther Adams"	October 3, 2014

== Season 13 (2014–2015) ==
No. in season	Title	Original release date
1	"Translation"	October 20, 2014
2	"Jurisdiction"	November 5, 2014
3	"Patient Zero - Updated"	November 13, 2014
4	"Worth"	December 23, 2014
5	"American Football"	January 29, 2015
6	"La Mancha Screwjob"	February 24, 2015
7	"To See Or Not To See"	June 10, 2015
8	"Looking Back"	September 23, 2015
9	"Hello: The Broadcast"	September 30, 2015
10	"DIY"	November 12, 2015
Episodes during Season 13 and before Season 14 (2014–2015)
1	"Haunted"	October 30, 2014
2	"Outside Westgate"	November 29, 2014
3	"Buttons Not Buttons"	December 12, 2014
4	"Radiolab Presents: Invisibilia"	January 9, 2015
5	"The Trust Engineers"	February 9, 2015
6	"Fu-Go"	March 10, 2015
7	"Los Frikis"	March 24, 2015
8	"VIDEO: Radiolab Presents: Radio Ambulante"	April 2, 2015
9	"The Living Room"	April 9, 2015
10	"Sight Unseen"	April 28, 2015
11	"Radiolab Live: Tell-Tale Hearts featuring Oliver Sacks"	May 12, 2015
12	"Nazi Summer Camp"	May 22, 2015
13	"Antibodies Part 1: CRISPR"	June 6, 2015
14	"Eye in the Sky"	June 18, 2015
15	"Mau Mau"	July 3, 2015
16	"Gray's Donation"	July 16, 2015
17	"Shrink"	July 30, 2015
18	"From the Archives: Oliver Sacks' Table of Elements"	August 6, 2015
19	"Elements"	August 23, 2015
20	"Remembering Oliver Sacks"	August 30, 2015
21	"The Rhino Hunter"	September 7, 2015
22	"Darkode"	September 21, 2015
23	"Smile My Ass"	October 6, 2015
24	"Update: New Normal?"	October 19, 2015
25	"Staph Retreat"	November 2, 2015
26	"Birthstory"	November 22, 2015
27	"The Cold War"	November 30, 2015
28	"The Fix"	December 8, 2015

== Season 14 (2015–2016) ==
No. in season	Title	Original release date
1	"Music Lab"	December 23, 2015
2	"Wild Things"	March 23, 2016
3	"I Hart K-Pop"	April 20, 2016
4	"Love Supreme"	July 20, 2016
5	"Threat Level"	August 24, 2016
6	"Donation and Mutation"	September 21, 2016
7	"Watching You, Watching Me"	October 26, 2016
8	"Defying Odds"	November 23, 2016
9	"Weights and Measures"	December 14, 2016
Episodes during Season 14 and before Season 15 (2015–2016)
1	"The Cathedral"	December 28, 2015
2	"I Don't Have To Answer That"	January 29, 2016
3	"Hard Knock Life"	February 12, 2016
4	"K-poparazzi"	February 24, 2016
5	"Debatable"	March 11, 2016
6	"Update: 23 Weeks 6 Days"	March 23, 2016
7	"Cellmates"	April 6, 2016
8	"On the Edge"	April 21, 2016
9	"Bigger Than Bacon"	May 9, 2016
10	"Coming Soon: More Perfect"	May 24, 2016
11	"The Buried Bodies Case"	June 3, 2016
12	"Radiolab Presents: More Perfect - The Political Thicket"	June 10, 2016
13	"Radiolab Presents: More Perfect - The Imperfect Plaintiffs"	June 28, 2016
14	"David and the Wire"	July 12, 2016
15	"From Tree to Shining Tree"	July 30, 2016
16	"Playing God"	August 21, 2016
17	"The Girl Who Doesn't Exist"	August 29, 2016
18	"Update: Eye In the Sky"	September 12, 2016
19	"The Primitive Streak"	September 23, 2016
20	"Seneca, Nebraska"	October 12, 2016
21	"Alpha Gal"	October 27, 2016
22	"One Vote"	November 7, 2016
23	"Radiolab Presents: More Perfect - Object Anyway"	November 22, 2016
24	"Bringing Gamma Back"	December 8, 2016
25	"It's Not Us, It's You"	December 16, 2016
26	"Lose Lose"	December 30, 2016

== Season 15 (2017) ==
No. in season	Title	Original release date
1	"Playing God: The Broadcast"	January 11, 2017
2	"Man vs Machine"	February 8, 2017
3	"Epic Battles"	March 15, 2017
4	"One Vote: The Broadcast"	April 12, 2017
5	"Earth Oddities"	June 14, 2017
6	"The War On Our Shore"	July 14, 2017
7	"Nukes: The Broadcast"	October 3, 2017
8	"Saving Animals"	December 6, 2017
Episodes during Season 15 and before Season 16 (2017)
1	"Radiolab Presents: On the Media: Busted, America's Poverty Myths"	January 18, 2017
2	"Stranger in Paradise"	January 27, 2017
3	"Radiolab Presents: Ponzi Supernova"	February 10, 2017
4	"Update: CRISPR"	February 24, 2017
5	"Shots Fired: Part 1"	March 17, 2017
6	"Shots Fired: Part 2"	March 24, 2017
7	"Nukes"	April 7, 2017
8	"Radiolab Extra: Henrietta Lacks"	April 18, 2017
9	"Funky Hand Jive"	April 26, 2017
10	"Null and Void"	May 12, 2017
11	"The Radio Lab"	May 25, 2017
12	"The Gondolier"	June 15, 2017
13	"Revising the Fault Line"	June 27, 2017
14	"The Ceremony"	July 14, 2017
15	"Breaking News"	July 27, 2017
16	"Truth Warriors"	August 3, 2017
17	"Truth Trolls"	August 10, 2017
18	"Where the Sun Don't Shine"	August 23, 2017
19	"Radiolab Presents: Anna in Somalia"	September 12, 2017
20	"Oliver Sipple"	September 21, 2017
21	"Driverless Dilemma"	September 26, 2017
22	"Radiolab Presents: More Perfect - American Pendulum I"	October 2, 2017
23	"Father K"	October 12, 2017
24	"Oliver Sacks: A Journey From Where to Where"	October 27, 2017
25	"Match Made in Marrow"	November 9, 2017
26	"Stereothreat"	November 23, 2017
27	"Radiolab Presents: More Perfect - Mr. Graham and the Reasonable Man"	November 30, 2017
28	"Super Cool"	December 5, 2017
29	"Big Little Questions"	December 20, 2017
30	"Bigger Little Questions"	December 22, 2017
31	"Inside Radiolab (Video)"	December 29, 2017
32	"How to Be a Hero"	January 9, 2018
33	"The Voice in Your Head - A Tribute to Joe Frank"	January 23, 2018
34	"Radiolab Presents: More Perfect - One Nation, Under Money"	January 31, 2018
35	"Ghosts of Football Past"	February 3, 2018

== After Season 15 (2018– ) ==
=== 2018 ===
No. in season	Title	Original release date
1	"Smarty Plants"	February 13, 2018
2	"The Curious Case of the Russian Flash Mob at the West Palm Beach Cheesecake Factory"	February 19, 2018
3	"Radiolab Presents: More Perfect - The Gun Show"	February 23, 2018
4	"Rippin’ the Rainbow an Even Newer One"	March 15, 2018
5	"Border Trilogy Part 1: Hole in the Fence"	March 23, 2018
6	"Border Trilogy Part 2: Hold the Line"	April 5, 2018
7	"Border Trilogy Part 3: What Remains"	April 20, 2018
8	"Dark Side of the Earth"	April 26, 2018
9	"More or Less Human"	May 17, 2018
10	"Unraveling Bolero"	May 22, 2018
11	"Poison Control"	June 1, 2018
12	"Birthstory"	June 7, 2018
13	"Gonads: The Primordial Journey"	June 15, 2018
14	"Gonads: Fronads"	June 23, 2018
15	"Gonads: X & Y"	June 30, 2018
16	"Gonads: Dutee"	July 21, 2018
17	"Gonads: Dana"	July 21, 2018
18	"Gonads: Sex Ed"	July 26, 2018
19	"The Bad Show"	July 27, 2018
20	"Post No Evil"	August 17, 2018
21	"27: The Most Perfect Album"	September 18, 2018
22	"Infective Heredity"	September 20, 2018
23	"Breaking Bad News Bears"	September 28, 2018
24	"In the No Part 1"	October 11, 2018
25	"In the No Part 2"	October 18, 2018
26	"In the No Part 3"	October 25, 2018
27	"War of the Worlds"	October 30, 2018
28	"Tweak the Vote"	November 4, 2018
29	"The Front Runner"	November 12, 2018
30	"UnErased: Dr. Davison and the Gay Cure"	November 21, 2018
31	"UnErased: Smid"	November 27, 2018
32	"Apologetical"	December 21, 2018
33	"A Clockwork Miracle"	December 27, 2018
34	"BONUS: Radiolab Scavenger Hunt"	December 28, 2018

=== 2019 ===
No. in season	Title	Original release date
1	"The Punchline"	January 16, 2019
2	"More Perfect: Sex Appeal"	January 22, 2019
3	"The Beauty Puzzle"	February 7, 2019
4	"Loops"	February 21, 2019
5	"Asking for a Friend"	February 28, 2019
6	"Asking for Another Friend"	March 7, 2019
7	"Bliss"	March 21, 2019
8	"For Whom the Cowbell Tolls"	March 29, 2019
9	"Americanish"	April 19, 2019
10	"Fu-Go"	April 25, 2019
11	"Dinopocalypse Redux"	May 2, 2019
12	"Bit Flip"	May 8, 2019
13	"The Good Samaritan"	May 24, 2019
14	"Neither Confirm Nor Deny"	June 4, 2019
15	"G: The Miseducation of Larry P"	June 7, 2019
16	"G: Problem Space"	June 13, 2019
17	"G: Relative Genius"	June 28, 2019
18	"G: Unfit"	July 17, 2019
19	"G: Unnatural Selection"	July 25, 2019
20	"G: The World's Smartest Animal"	July 29, 2019
21	"More Perfect: Cruel and Unusual"	August 8, 2019
22	"Right to be Forgotten"	August 23, 2019
23	"The Memory Palace"	August 27, 2019
24	"What's Left When You're Right?"	September 5, 2019
25	"Tit for Tat"	September 17, 2019
26	"Silky Love"	September 27, 2019
27	"Radiolab Presents: Dolly Parton's America"	October 15, 2019
28	"Birdie in the Cage"	October 22, 2019
29	"Songs that Cross Borders"	October 29, 2019
30	"Dolly Parton's America: Neon Moss"	November 7, 2019
31	"Breaking News"	November 19, 2019
32	"Breaking Bongo"	November 26, 2019
33	"Things"	December 12, 2019
34	"There and Back Again"	December 18, 2019
35	"Man Against Horse"	December 27, 2019

=== 2020 ===
No. in season	Title	Original release date
1	"60 Words"	January 7, 2020
2	"Body Count"	January 24, 2020
3	"The Bobbys"	January 30, 2020
4	"The Other Latif: Episode 1"	February 4, 2020
5	"The Other Latif: Episode 2"	February 11, 2020
6	"The Other Latif: Episode 3"	February 18, 2020
7	"The Other Latif: Episode 4"	February 25, 2020
8	"The Other Latif: Bonus Episode!"	March 3, 2020
9	"The Other Latif: Episode 5"	March 6, 2020
10	"The Other Latif: Episode 6"	March 17, 2020
11	"Dispatch 1: Numbers"	March 27, 2020
12	"Dispatch 2: Every Day is Ignaz Semmelweis Day"	April 1, 2020
13	"Dispatch 3: Shared Immunity"	April 3, 2020
14	"Space"	April 6, 2020
15	"Dispatch 4: Six Feet"	April 10, 2020
16	"The Cataclysm Sentence"	April 18, 2020
17	"Atomic Artifacts"	April 24, 2020
18	"Dispatch 5: Don't Stop Believin'"	May 6, 2020
19	"David and Dominique"	May 8, 2020
20	"Why Fish Don't Exist"	May 13, 2020
21	"Octomom"	May 15, 2020
22	"Speedy Beet"	May 22, 2020
23	"Dispatch 6: Strange Times"	May 29, 2020
24	"Nina"	June 6, 2020
25	"Graham"	June 6, 2020
26	"The Liberation of RNA"	June 13, 2020
27	"Post No Evil Redux"	June 19, 2020
28	"The Third. A TED Talk."	June 25, 2020
29	"The Flag and the Fury"	July 12, 2020
30	"Dispatches from 1918"	July 17, 2020
31	"Baby Blue Blood Drive"	July 23, 2020
32	"Invisible Allies"	July 30, 2020
33	"Uncounted"	August 7, 2020
34	"The Wubi Effect"	August 14, 2020
35	"Lebanon, USA"	August 20, 2020
36	"Translation"	August 27, 2020
37	"Fungus Amungus"	September 4, 2020
38	"Bringing Gamma Back, Again"	September 10, 2020
39	"Falling"	September 17, 2020
40	"More Perfect: Sex Appeal"	September 18, 2020
41	"Insomnia Line"	September 25, 2020
42	"No Special Duty"	October 2, 2020
43	"Kittens Kick the Giggly Blue Robot All Summer"	October 8, 2020
44	"What If?"	October 23, 2020
45	"How to Win Friends and Influence Baboons"	October 31, 2020
46	"Bloc Party"	November 2, 2020
47	"Breaking Benford"	November 13, 2020
48	"Deception"	November 19, 2020
49	"Dispatch 13: Challenge Trials"	November 24, 2020
50	"The Great Vaccinator"	December 3, 2020
51	"Enemy of Mankind"	December 10, 2020
52	"The Ashes on the Lawn"	December 18, 2020
53	"A Terrible Covid Christmas Special"	December 23, 2020

=== 2021 ===
No. in season	Title	Original release date
1	"Sight Unseen"	January 13, 2021
2	"More Money Less Problems"	January 15, 2021
3	"Post Reports: Four Hours of Insurrection"	January 16, 2021
4	"Smile My Ass"	January 28, 2021
5	"Facebook's Supreme Court"	February 12, 2021
6	"Red Herring"	February 19, 2021
7	"The Ceremony"	February 25, 2021
8	"Dispatch 14: Covid Crystal Ball"	March 12, 2021
9	"Escapescape"	March 18, 2021
10	"Elements"	March 25, 2021
11	"What Up Homies?"	April 2, 2021
12	"The Septendecennial Sing-Along"	April 15, 2021
13	"Deep Cuts"	April 22, 2021
14	"Kleptotherms"	May 5, 2021
15	"Brown Box"	May 13, 2021
16	"The Dirty Drug and the Ice Cream Tub"	May 21, 2021
17	"The Rhino Hunter"	May 27, 2021
18	"Breath"	June 11, 2021
19	"The Vanishing of Harry Pace: Episode 1"	June 18, 2021
20	"The Vanishing of Harry Pace: Episode 2"	June 18, 2021
21	"The Vanishing of Harry Pace: Episode 3"	June 25, 2021
22	"The Vanishing of Harry Pace: Episode 4"	June 28, 2021
23	"The Vanishing of Harry Pace: Episode 5"	July 2, 2021
24	"The Vanishing of Harry Pace: Episode 6"	July 9, 2021
25	"G: Unfit"	July 15, 2021
26	"Breaking News about The Other Latif"	July 19, 2021
27	"The Queen of Dying"	July 23, 2021
28	"Gonads: Dutee"	August 5, 2021
29	"Everybody's Got One"	August 21, 2021
30	"The Unsilencing"	August 26, 2021
31	"60 Words, 20 Years"	September 10, 2021
32	"In the Running"	September 17, 2021
33	"HEAVY METAL"	September 24, 2021
34	"Oliver Sipple"	October 1, 2021
35	"Of Bombs and Butterflies"	October 15, 2021
36	"Mixtape: Dakou"	October 22, 2021
37	"Mixtape: Jack and Bing"	October 29, 2021
38	"Mixtape: The Wandering Soul"	November 5, 2021
39	"Mixtape: Cassetternet"	November 12, 2021
40	"Mixtape: Help?"	November 19, 2021
41	"Animal Minds"	November 26, 2021
42	"Return of Alpha Gal"	December 10, 2021
43	"Vanishing Words"	December 17, 2021
44	"Flop Off"	December 31, 2021

=== 2022 ===
No. in season	Title	Original release date
1	"Worst. Year. Ever."	January 7, 2022
2	"Darkode"	January 14, 2022
3	"The 11th: A Letter From George"	January 21, 2022
4	"The First Radiolab"	January 28, 2022
This is a rerun from the very first episode of Radiolab.
5	"Forests on Forests"	February 4, 2022
6	"Hello"	February 11, 2022
7	"The Wordless Place"	February 18, 2022
8	"Speed"	February 25, 2022
9	"Life in a Barrel"	March 4, 2022
10	"The Helen Keller Exorcism"	March 11, 2022
11	"Stress"	March 18, 2022
12	"The Right Stuff"	March 25, 2022
13	"Inheritance"	April 1, 2022
14	"In the Dust of This Planet"	April 8, 2022
15	"NULL"	April 15, 2022
16	"The Other Latif: Cuba-ish"	April 22, 2022
17	"Hello, My Name Is"	April 29, 2022
18	"Debatable"	May 6, 2022
19	"Frailmales"	May 13, 2022
20	"La Mancha Screwjob"	May 20, 2022
21	"Radiolab After Dark"	May 27, 2022
22	"Origin Stories"	June 3, 2022
23	"Neanderthal's Revenge"	June 10, 2022
24	"No Special Duty"	June 17, 2022
25	"Galápagos"	June 24, 2022
26	"My Thmyus, Myself"	June 30, 2022
27	"Baby Blue Blood Drive"	July 8, 2022
28	"The Gatekeeper"	July 15, 2022
29	"You v. You"	July 22, 2022
30	"The Humpback and the Killer"	July 29, 2022
31	"Escape"	August 5, 2022
32	"Infinities"	August 12, 2022
33	"9-Volt Nirvana"	August 19, 2022
34	"Gigaverse"	August 26, 2022
35	"Rodney v. Death"	September 2, 2022
36	"40,000 Recipes for Murder"	September 9, 2022
37	"Quicksaaaand!"	September 16, 2022
38	"Terrestrials: The Mastermind"	September 23, 2022
39	"Playing God"	September 30, 2022
40	"The Theater of David Byrne's Mind"	October 7, 2022
41	"No Touch Abortion"	October 14, 2022
42	"Black Box"	October 21, 2022
43	"The Weather Report"	October 28, 2022
44	"Guts"	November 4, 2022
45	"Butt Stuff"	November 11, 2022
46	"What's Up Doc?"	November 18, 2022
47	"More Perfect: The Political Thicket"	November 25, 2022
48	"The Ashes on the Lawn"	December 2, 2022
49	"The Middle of Everything"	December 9, 2022
50	"Null and Void"	December 16, 2022
51	"The Flight Before Christmas"	December 23, 2022
52	"New Normal"	December 30, 2022

=== 2023 ===
No. in season	Title	Original release date
1	"Universe In Verse"	January 6, 2023
2	"Games"	January 13, 2023
3	"Ukraine: Under the Counter"	January 20, 2023
4	"Birthstory"	January 27, 2023
5	"Ukraine: The Handoff"	February 3, 2023
6	"Bliss"	February 10, 2023
7	"Golden Goose"	February 17, 2023
8	"The Trust Engineers"	February 24, 2023
9	"Crabs All the Way Down"	March 3, 2023
10	"Buttons Not Buttons"	March 10, 2023
11	"Apologetical"	March 17, 2023
12	"Alone Enough"	March 24, 2023
13	"The Good Samaritan"	March 31, 2023
14	"The Library of Alexandria"	April 7, 2023
15	"Abortion Pills, Take Two"	March 17, 2023
16	"Corpse Demon"	April 21, 2023
17	"The Golden Rule"	April 28, 2023
18	"Ologies: Dark Matters"	May 3, 2023
19	"The War on Our Shore"	May 12, 2023
20	"Family People"	May 19, 2023
21	"On the Edge"	May 26, 2023
22	"The Seagulls"	June 2, 2023
23	"Eye in the Sky"	June 9, 2023
24	"Beware the Sand Striker"	June 16, 2023
25	"Americanish"	June 23, 2023
26	"The Cataclysm Sentence"	June 30, 2023
27	"Man Against Horse"	July 7, 2023
28	"The Fellowship of the Tree Rings"	July 14, 2023
29	"The Right Stuff"	July 21, 2023
30	"Little Black Holes Everywhere"	July 28, 2023
31	"Right to be Forgotten"	August 4, 2023
32	"The Internet Dilemma"	August 11, 2023
33	"The Wubi Effect"	August 18, 2023
34	"Rumble Strip: Finn and the Bell"	August 25, 2023
35	"Touch at a Distance"	September 1, 2023
36	"Born this Way?"	September 8, 2023
37	"Driverless Dilemma"	September 15, 2023
38	"Smog Cloud Silver Lining"	September 22, 2023
39	"Poison Control"	September 29, 2023
40	"The Secret to a Long Life"	October 6, 2023
41	"Border Trilogy Part 1: Hole in the Fence"	October 13, 2023
42	"Border Trilogy Part 2: Hold the Line"	October 20, 2023
43	"Border Trilogy Part 3: What Remains"	October 27, 2023
44	"Toy Soldiers"	November 3, 2023
45	"Funky Hand Jive"	November 10, 2023
46	"The Interstitium"	November 17, 2023
47	"Shrink"	November 24, 2023
48	"Boy Man"	December 1, 2023
49	"A 4-Track Mind"	December 8, 2023
50	"Death Interrupted"	December 15, 2023
51	"Numbers"	December 22, 2023
52	"Zeroworld"	December 29, 2023

=== 2024 ===
No. in season	Title	Original release date
1	"Stochasticity"	January 5, 2024
2	"Our Little Stupid Bodies"	January 12, 2024
3	"The Living Room"	January 19, 2024
4	"Zoozve"	January 26, 2024
5	"G: Relative Genius"	February 2, 2024
6	"Breaking Newsve About Zoozve"	February 5, 2024
7	"Cheating Death"	February 9, 2024
8	"G: The World's Smartest Animal"	February 16, 2024
9	"Hold On"	March 1, 2024
10	"Staph Retreat"	March 8, 2024
11	"Throughline: Dare to Dissent"	March 15, 2024
12	"Finding Emilie"	March 22, 2024
13	"Short Cuts: Drawn Onward"	April 2, 2024
14	"The Moon Itself"	April 5, 2024
15	"The Distance of the Moon"	April 12, 2024
16	"Small Potatoes"	April 19, 2024
17	"Memory and Forgetting"	April 26, 2024
18	"Selected Shorts"	May 10, 2024
19	"Lucy"	May 17, 2024
20	"Mixtapes to the Moon"	May 24, 2024
21	"Argentine Invasion"	May 31, 2024
22	"Aphantasia"	June 14, 2024
23	"Birdie in the Cage"	June 21, 2024
24	"The Alford Plea"	June 28, 2024
25	"Happy Birthday, Good Dr. Sacks"	July 5, 2024
26	"How to Save a Life"	July 12, 2024
27	"Lose Lose"	July 19, 2024
28	"Terrestrials: The Trio"	July 26, 2024
29	"Sleep"	August 2, 2024
30	"Up in Smoke"	August 9, 2024
31	"More Perfect: The Gun Show"	August 16, 2024
32	"Uneasy as ABC"	August 23, 2024
33	"Big Little Questions"	August 30, 2024
34	"Shell Game"	September 6, 2024
35	"The Times They Are a-Changin'"	September 13, 2024
36	"A Little Pompeiian Fish Sauce Goes a Long Way"	September 20, 2024
37	"Octomom"	September 27, 2024
38	"Terrestrials: Stumpisode"	October 4, 2024
39	"Why Don't Sex Scandals Matter Anymore?"	October 11, 2024
40	"Tweak the Vote"	October 18, 2024
41	"The Unpopular Vote"	October 25, 2024
42	"Haunted"	October 31, 2024
43	"The Ecstasy of an Open Brain"	November 8, 2024
44	"Hello"	August 21, 2014
45	"Science Vs: The Funniest Joke in the World"	November 22, 2024
46	"Less Than Kilogram"	November 29, 2024
47	"How Stockholm Stuck"	December 6, 2024
48	"Dark Side of the Earth"	December 13, 2024
49	"Curiosity Killed the Adage"	December 20, 2024
50	"Probing Where the Sun Does Shine: A Holiday Special"	December 24, 2024
