= Nathan Hylden =

American painter

Nathan Hylden (born 1978 in Fergus Falls, Minnesota) is a contemporary American abstract painter based in Los Angeles, California. He is known for creating abstract paintings exploring philosophical relationships between cause and effect, absence and presence, and emptiness and meaning; as well as for process-oriented artworks that investigate dualities of existence.

Hylden earned his Bachelor of Fine Arts from Minnesota State University in 2001 and Master of Fine Arts from Art Center College of Design in Los Angeles in 2006. He later studied with abstract painter Michael Krebber in Frankfurt, photographer Christopher Williams, and multimedia artist Richard Hawkins in Los Angeles.

== Painting style ==
Hylden utilizes diverse media in his paintings, such as aluminum, pearlescent paint, spray paints, and even blank canvases. Hylden often questions the essence of painting in his artworks.

His pieces are often produced as a series and follow a very strict creative process which links all the works through common motifs. Even though the pieces in a series are linked to each other, each one tells a particular story and represents a particular point in time in the evolution of the sequence. For his 2010 series of nine paintings, Hylden devised a strict technical process of painting canvases with holographic gold, arranging them on the floor, spray painting the overlapping sections in yellow, and finally stenciling black stripes onto each piece. As such, he created unique but interconnected pieces.

Hylden likes to hint at the source of his abstract paintings. His studio is a source of his inspiration and he has incorporated images of simple objects or groupings of objects from his studio into his paintings. His solo exhibition So There’s That at Richard Telles Fine Art displays two paintings which depict a vastly magnified portion of the wall in his studio. The art critic Alicia Eler described this as ability to re-contextualize the mundane in the context of art.

== Exhibitions ==
Hylden's works have been exhibited internationally.

=== Solo exhibitions ===
Some of his selected solo exhibitions include:

- 2019, Hakgojae Gallery, Seoul, South Korea
- 2018, For Now And So, Misako & Rosen, Tokyo, Japan
- 2018, So Doing, Galerie Art Concept, Paris, France
- 2017, Nearing On To Do, Midway Contemporary Art, Minneapolis, the United States
- 2015, Nathan Hylden, Johann Konig, Berlin, Germany
- 2014, Off All Things, Misako & Rosen, Tokyo, Japan
- 2014, More Over, Art: Concept, Paris, France
- 2013, Meanwhile, Kunstverein, Hamburg, Germany
- 2011, So There’s That, Richard Telles Fine Art, Los Angeles, US
- 2011, Volker Bradtke, Düsseldorf, Germany

=== Group exhibitions ===
- 2018, Did you close your eyes to make this painting?, BWSMX, Mexico City, Mexico
- 2015, Painting The Sky Blue Mallorca Landings, Palma de Mallorca, Spain
- 2010, Bagna Cauda, Galerie Art Concept, Paris, France
