= Radiolab =

American radio program

- Genre: Long-form journalism
- Running time: 30–60 minutes
- Country of origin: United States
- Language: English
- Home station: WNYC
- Syndicates: WNYC Show Distribution
- Hosted by: Latif Nasser; Molly Webster; Lulu Miller (formerly); Jad Abumrad (formerly); Robert Krulwich (formerly)
- Created by: Jad Abumrad; Robert Krulwich; Ellen Horne
- Produced by: Simon Adler; Jeremy S. Bloom; Becca Bressler; Rachael Cusick; David Gebel; Sindhu Gnanasambandan; Maria Paz Gutiérrez; Dylan Keefe; Matt Kielty; Annie McEwen; Alexandria Neason; Sarah Qari; Arianne Wack; Pat Walters; Molly Webster
- Executive producers: Sarah Sandbach; Ellen Horne (formerly); Suzie Lechtenberg (formerly)
- Senior editor: Soren Wheeler
- Recording studio: New York, NY
- Original release: April 14, 2002
- Website: radiolab.org

Radiolab is a radio program and podcast produced by WNYC, a public radio station based in New York City, and broadcast on more than 570 public radio stations in the United States. The show has earned many industry awards for its "imaginative use of radio" including a National Academies Communication Award and two Peabody Awards.

Radiolab was founded by Jad Abumrad in 2002, and evolved with co-host Robert Krulwich and executive producer Ellen Horne. As of 2026, Radiolab is hosted by Latif Nasser and Molly Webster.

The show focuses on topics of a scientific, philosophical, and political nature. The show attempts to approach broad, difficult topics such as "time" and "morality" in an accessible and light-hearted manner and with a distinctive audio production style.

== History ==
The original version of Radiolab was a three-hour weekly show on New York City radio station WNYC's AM signal. Abumrad, a freelancer for WNYC, produced and hosted the show, which presented documentary radio work in an original style. Dean Cappello, then the chief content officer of WNYC Radio, told The New York Times that it was conceived back in 2002 as a space for experimentation and also as a way to fill a "blank space" on the station’s Sunday-night schedule.

The early themed episodes were not always science-related, but tackled issues such as the death penalty, religious fundamentalism and politics in Africa and the Middle East.

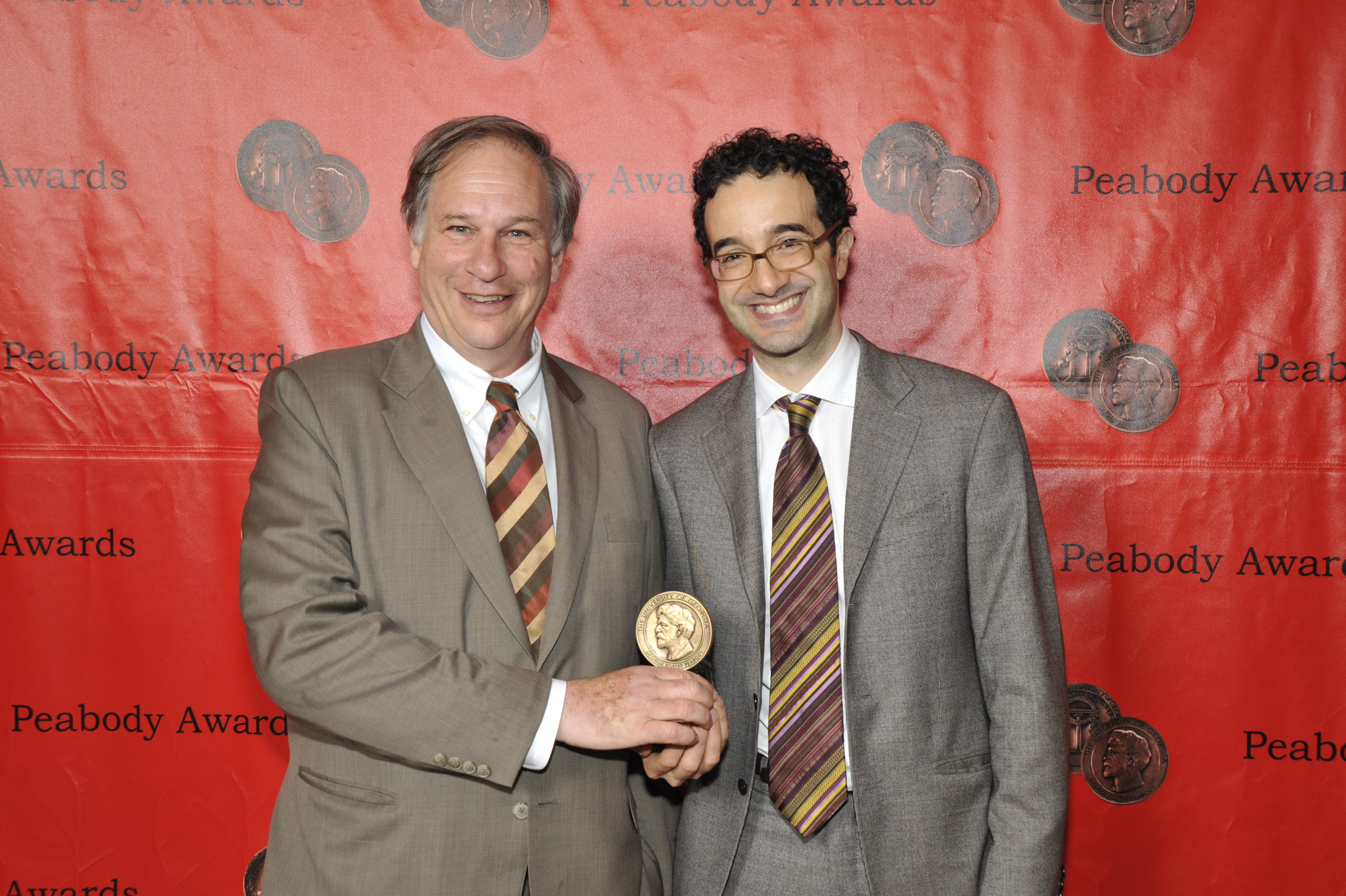
Robert Krulwich and Jad Abumrad at the 2010 Peabody Awards

In 2003, Abumrad was given a freelance assignment by WNYC to interview ABC News science reporter Robert Krulwich and the two men discovered they had a lot in common: both were alumni of Oberlin College (though 25 years apart), and both had worked at WBAI before moving on to WNYC and NPR. They became fast friends and began collaborating as co-hosts on experimental radio pieces — initially outside of Radiolab. In 2003, they sent their first piece to radio producer Ira Glass for a proposed Flag Day episode of This American Life. The 2-minute piece, which never aired on This American Life, was included in the 2008 Radiolab episode “Jad and Robert: The Early Years.” In the episode Abumrad and Krulwich interview Glass, and ask him his recollection of the piece. "It was horrible", Glass said. In an interview with Abumrad and Krulwich, Glass said: "I never would have put the two of you together on anything again… It's just amazing that you were able to put together such a wonderful program after that."

In 2003, Abumrad was joined on Radiolab by Executive Producer Ellen Horne, whom Abumrad credits with breathing life into the show. They developed the show, and by January 2004, Radiolab had become an hour-long, science-themed program characterized by Abumrad's unique sound design style. The program was then still considered experimental. In June 2004, Robert Krulwich appeared as a "guest host" on an episode titled "Time." By the following episode ("Space", aired two weeks later), they were co-hosts. In 2005, the program had its first official season, with five episodes, on WNYC. The program gained national distribution soon after. Live shows were introduced in 2008.

Initially distributed nationally by NPR, WNYC began distributing the show in 2015. The change was marked by the omission of NPR's name in the show's opening audio sequence after the tagline, "You're listening to Radiolab...from WNYC."

Horne left RadioLab in 2015, and Krulwich retired as co-host in February 2020. That September, Lulu Miller and Latif Nasser became co-hosts, succeeding Krulwich. In January 2022, Abumrad announced his retirement from Radiolab, handing over the reins to co-hosts Miller and Nasser. The podcast offers a subscription called The Lab with which listeners can directly support the production.

In November of 2026, Lulu Miller announced her decision to host the kids show Terrestrials full time. Molly Webster replaced her as co-host.

== Format ==
Each episode of RadioLab is one hour long and tackles various philosophical and scientific topics. Each episode is elaborately styled. For instance, thematic—and often dissonant and atonal—music accompanies much of the commentary. In an April 2011 interview with The New York Times, Abumrad explained the choices in music: "I put a lot of jaggedy sounds, little plurps and things, strange staccato, percussive things." In addition, previously recorded interview segments are interspersed with the show's live dialogue, adding a layered, call-and-response effect to the questions posed by the hosts. These recordings are often unedited and the interviewee's asides appear in the final product. In the same New York Times interview, Abumrad said, "You're trying to capture the rhythms and the movements, the messiness of the actual experience.... It sounds like life." And unlike traditional journalism, in which the reader is given only access to the final article, not the interview, Abumrad added that Radiolab's process is more transparent.

The episode credits are generally narrated by people who were interviewed or featured on the show, rather than the hosts, while the program credits are read by listeners.

As of June 15, 2009, the podcast offers full, hour-long episodes on a regular schedule with a varied number of interspersed, abbreviated podcasts "that follow some detour or left turn, explore music we love, take you to live events, and generally try to shake up your universe". The extra podcasts, called "Shorts", are occasionally combined into full-length compilation episodes.

== Reception and awards ==
Radiolab has been widely acclaimed among listeners and critics alike for its imaginative format and original use of sound design. It has been hailed, along with This American Life, as one of the most innovative shows on American radio.

As of January 2023, Radiolab has earned 13 podcast industry award nominations, including 7 wins, including the 2013 People's Choice Podcast Award for Best Science and Medicine Podcast and the 2015 People's Choice Podcast Award for Best Produced Podcast. Radiolab was also awarded for the Shorty Award for Best Podcast.

Radiolab has also won two Peabody Awards for broadcast excellence. The first Peabody was awarded to Radiolab for the show overall, while the second was awarded for an individual episode titled "60 Words" (aired on April 18, 2014).

Radiolab also received a 2007 National Academies Communication Award "for their imaginative use of radio to make science accessible to broad audiences". The program has received two Peabody Awards; first in 2010 and again in 2014.

In 2011, Abumrad received the MacArthur grant, in recognition of his work with RadioLab.

In a 2007–2008 study by Multimedia Research (sponsored by the National Science Foundation), it was determined that over 95 percent of listeners reported that the science-based material featured on Radiolab was accessible. Additionally, upwards of 80 percent of listeners reported that the program's pace was exciting, and over 80 percent reported that the layering of interviews was engaging.

On January 26, 2024, Radiolab aired an episode about the asteroid 2002 VE_{68}, which Nasser first noticed on his child's Solar System poster, where it was mistakenly referred to as "ZOOZVE". This lead Radiolab to propose the name "Zoozve" for the asteroid, which was approved and announced by the International Astronomical Union on February 5, 2024. Radiolab and the IAU held a public naming campaign for the asteroid 2004 GU_{9} from June to September 2024. The winning name was Cardea, which was announced by the IAU on January 13, 2025.

== Controversy ==
On September 24, 2012, in a podcast titled "The Fact of the Matter", the program ran a segment about the yellow rain incidents in Laos and surrounding countries in the 1970s. Included in the story was an interview with Hmong veteran and refugee Eng Yang, with his niece Kao Kalia Yang serving as translator. After hearing the segment, Kao Kalia Yang and others complained that her uncle's viewpoints had been dismissed or edited out, that interviewer Robert Krulwich had treated them callously, and that the overall approach to the story had been racist. The complaints prompted several rounds of allegation, apology, rebuttal, and edits to the podcast, as well as commentary in various sources such as the public radio newspaper Current.

On August 12, 2017, Radiolab removed an episode titled "Truth Trolls" about the attacks on LaBeouf, Rönkkö & Turner's HEWILLNOTDIVIDE.US art project by trolls. The program had been criticized for appearing to condone the actions of extremist groups, with Turner condemning the reporting as "abhorrent and irresponsible" for describing the vandalism and harassment they had been subjected to as "a really encouraging story" and "comforting." Abumrad issued an apology for giving the impression that they "essentially condoned some pretty despicable ideology and behavior," while WNYC stated that they supported Radiolab's decision to remove the podcast, adding that "Radiolab unambiguously rejects the beliefs and actions of the trolls, and deeply regrets doing anything that would imply differently."

== Radiolab live ==
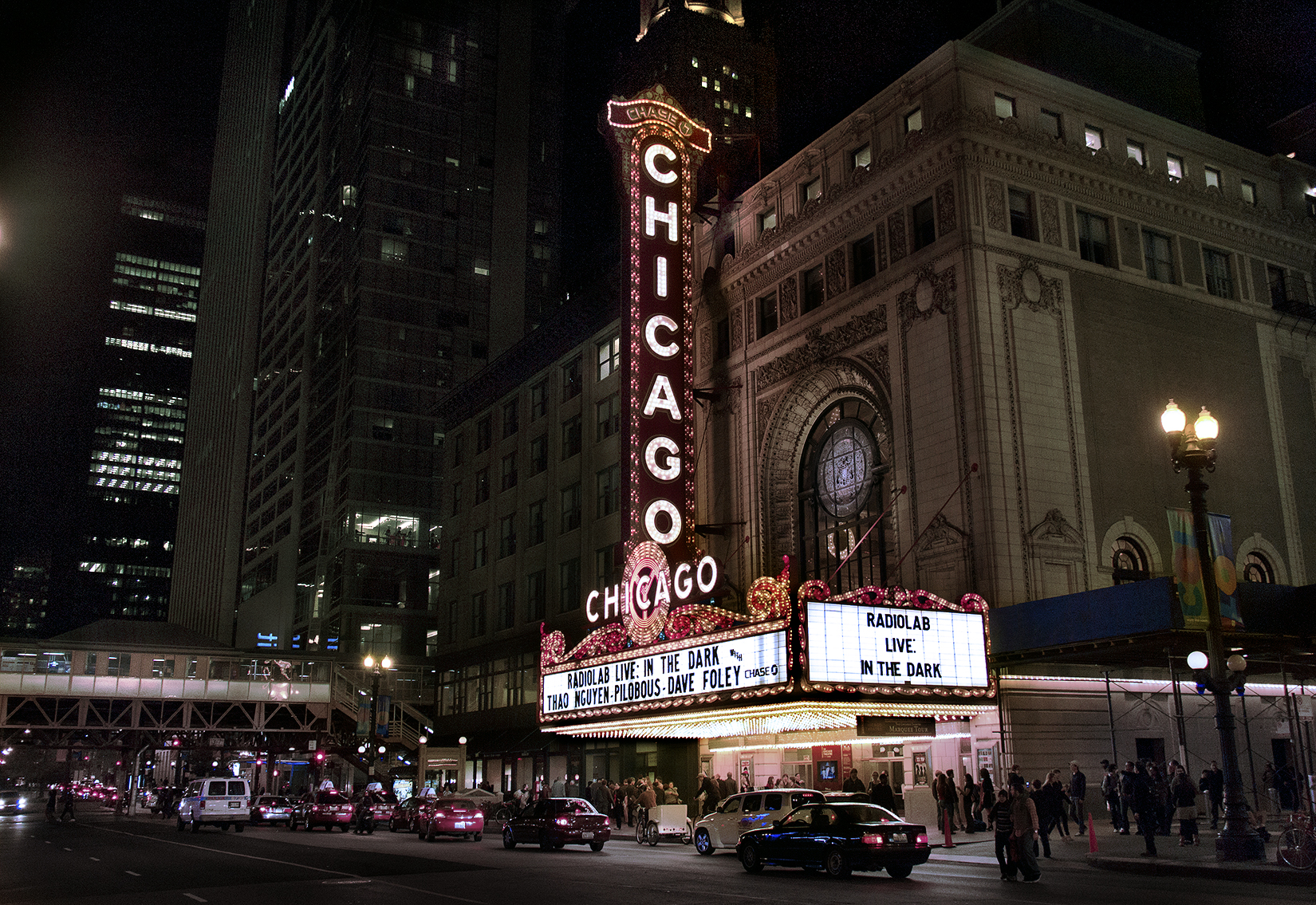
Radiolab live at the Chicago Theatre in September 2012

In spring 2011, Krulwich and Abumrad took the show on a live, national tour, selling out in cities such as New York, Seattle, and Los Angeles.

The tour covered 21 cities and primarily focused on a speculative fringe theory regarding the Cretaceous–Paleogene extinction event that has not been published in a peer-reviewed journal. The fundamental new idea surrounding this theory is that when a large asteroid impacted the Earth, the asteroid driving into the ground caused the rock to become heated so extremely that it became gaseous. This "rock-gas" was then ejected outside the Earth's atmosphere and into space. The rock-gas, after cooling into many tiny glass particles, was pulled back in by Earth's gravity. The majority of this "glass-rain" burned up in the Earth's atmosphere upon re-entry, causing the Earth's atmosphere to become superheated, killing most of the species living on the surface of the Earth within a matter of hours. The episode did not include any discussion of the problems with the theory or that it has not been published in a peer-reviewed journal.

Episode 3 of Season 12, titled "Apocalyptical – Live from the Paramount in Seattle", was recorded at one of the live show tour locations that Radiolab performed. Unlike most shows, this show was also filmed, and made available on their official website.

== More Perfect ==
In June 2016, Radiolab launched their first "spinoff series" entitled More Perfect. The series examines controversial and historic cases in the Supreme Court of the United States. The show's title comes from the preamble of the United States Constitution which begins "We the People, in order to form a more perfect Union". The team working on the podcast became interested in the topic after studying an adoption case related to the Indian Child Welfare Act.

The show's first season launched on June 1, 2016, and ran for eight episodes. The second season returned on September 30, 2017, and aired nine episodes. The show's third season began on September 18, 2018, and ran for nine episodes.

The show relaunched on May 11, 2023, hosted by Julia Longoria (former host of The Experiment, a co-production of WNYC Studios and The Atlantic, and one of the original More Perfect producers), with a 12-part season.

Since then, More Perfect has not aired any more episodes, although reruns are still occasionally posted in the Radiolab feed.

== Radiolab for Kids ==
Radiolab launched series Radiolab for Kids which features content suitable for children and family listening, including the series Terrestrial on September 15, 2022.
