= Alicia Eler =

American journalist

- Born: 1984 (age 41–42); Chicago, Illinois, U.S.
- Education: Oberlin College (BA)
- Website: aliciaeler.com

Alicia Eler (born 1984) is a visual art critic and reporter at the Star Tribune in Minneapolis. Eler's cultural criticism and reporting are published in The Guardian, Glamour, New York magazine, CNN, LA Weekly, Chicago Tribune, Chicago Sun-Times, New Inquiry, Hyperallergic, Aperture, Maxim, Art21, and Artforum.

Her first book was The Selfie Generation: How Our Self Images Are Changing Our Notions of Privacy, Property, Sex, Consent, and Culture.

== Early life and education ==
Eler was born and grew up in the Chicago suburb of Skokie, Illinois. She attended Evanston Township High School, and then went on to receive a BA in art history from Oberlin College in 2006.

== Career ==
Eler is visual art critic/reporter at the Star Tribune of Minneapolis. She has written for many arts publications, including Hyperallergic, Artsy, Aperture, Artforum, Art Papers, and others.

She has curated multiple art shows involving video art, new media and internet aesthetics. In 2013, Chicago magazine identified her as one of "six young art curators you should know," noting her use of social media.

Eler has written long-form culture essays. She has also written personal narrative essays about adolescence, queerness, and digital vulnerability for The Guardian and New York magazine. She has interviewed various celebrities.

From 2013 to 2014, Eler ran a column on Hyperallergic that was popularly referred to as the "Selfie Column." The column investigated the selfie as a popular culture phenomenon, considering its roots in self-portraiture, social networked culture, and feminism. The column ran every Monday, and included a round up of the week's news, Eler's selfie analysis, and selfie contributions from readers.

Eler has co-authored two essays on the affective labor and gamification of internet dating culture with writer Eve Peyser for The New Inquiry. Their first Tinder essay, “How to Win Tinder,” was named as one of Gawker's "The Best Things We Read in 2015" and one of Autostraddle's "The Best Longreads of 2015 — All Written by Women" She was referred to as a Tinder expert on David Lizerbram & Associates podcast, Products of the Mind. Wired magazine featured their essay in the story "Can Women Build a Better Tinder?". Their second essay, "Tinderization of Feeling" received attention from Le Monde (France), The Daily Beast, Hyperallergic, The Independent, and The Fader. The essay was also translated into Brazilian Portuguese. On Valentine's Day 2016, Peyser and Eler were interviewed on Toronto-based Mark Towhey's Newstalk 1010 radio show.

Eler was the guest editor-in-chief of two issues of PBS’ Art21 Magazine. She worked on the Family Issue (May/June 2015) and the Happiness Issue (September/October 2015). She is an LA correspondent for Hyperallergic. Previously she was the tech culture reporter for ReadWrite. Eler has also worked with the Chicago Tribune as the arts and entertainment community manager for the ChicagoNow blog.

Eler broke the news story "President Obama Pens Apology to an Art Historian" for Hyperallergic. It was featured on two network TV shows: MSNBC's Rachel Maddow show and NBC's Hardball with Chris Matthews. The story was picked up by The New York Times, New York magazine, New York Post, Reuters, Talking Points Memo, Politico, Memorandum, Huffington Post, Complex, Washington Examiner, Townhall, The Wire, Mediaite, Chronicle of Higher Education.

== Reception ==
The DailyDot named her one of "15 hilarious women you need to follow on Twitter".

== Books ==
- The Selfie Generation: How Our Self Images Are Changing Our Notions of Privacy, Property, Sex, Consent, and Culture.
