= Robert Krulwich =

American radio and television journalist (born 1947)

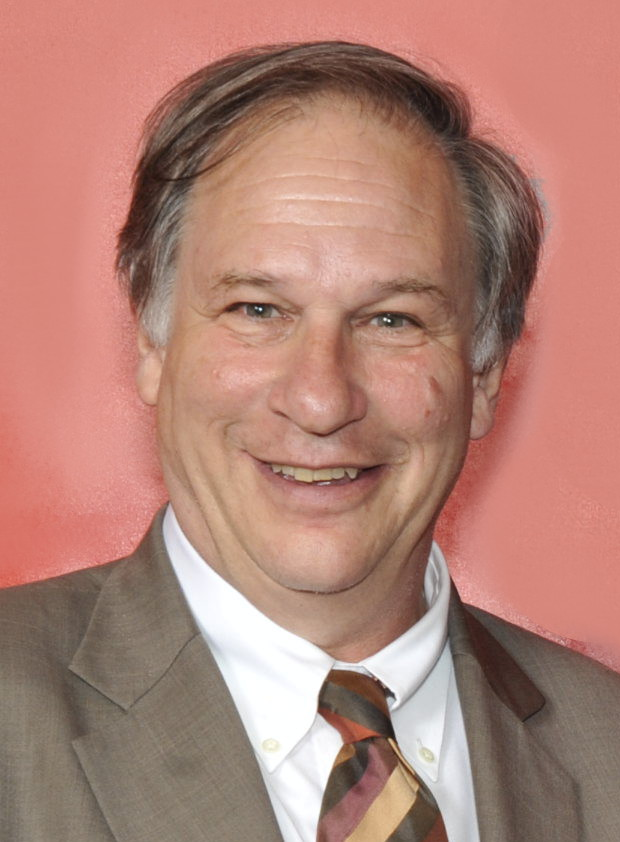
- Krulwich in 2011
- Born: Robert Louis Krulwich; August 5, 1947 (age 79)
- Education: Oberlin College (B.A.); Columbia University (J.D.)
- Spouse: Tamar Lewin
- Children: 2
- Presenting career
- Show: Radiolab
- Station: WNYC
- Style: Host
- Country: United States

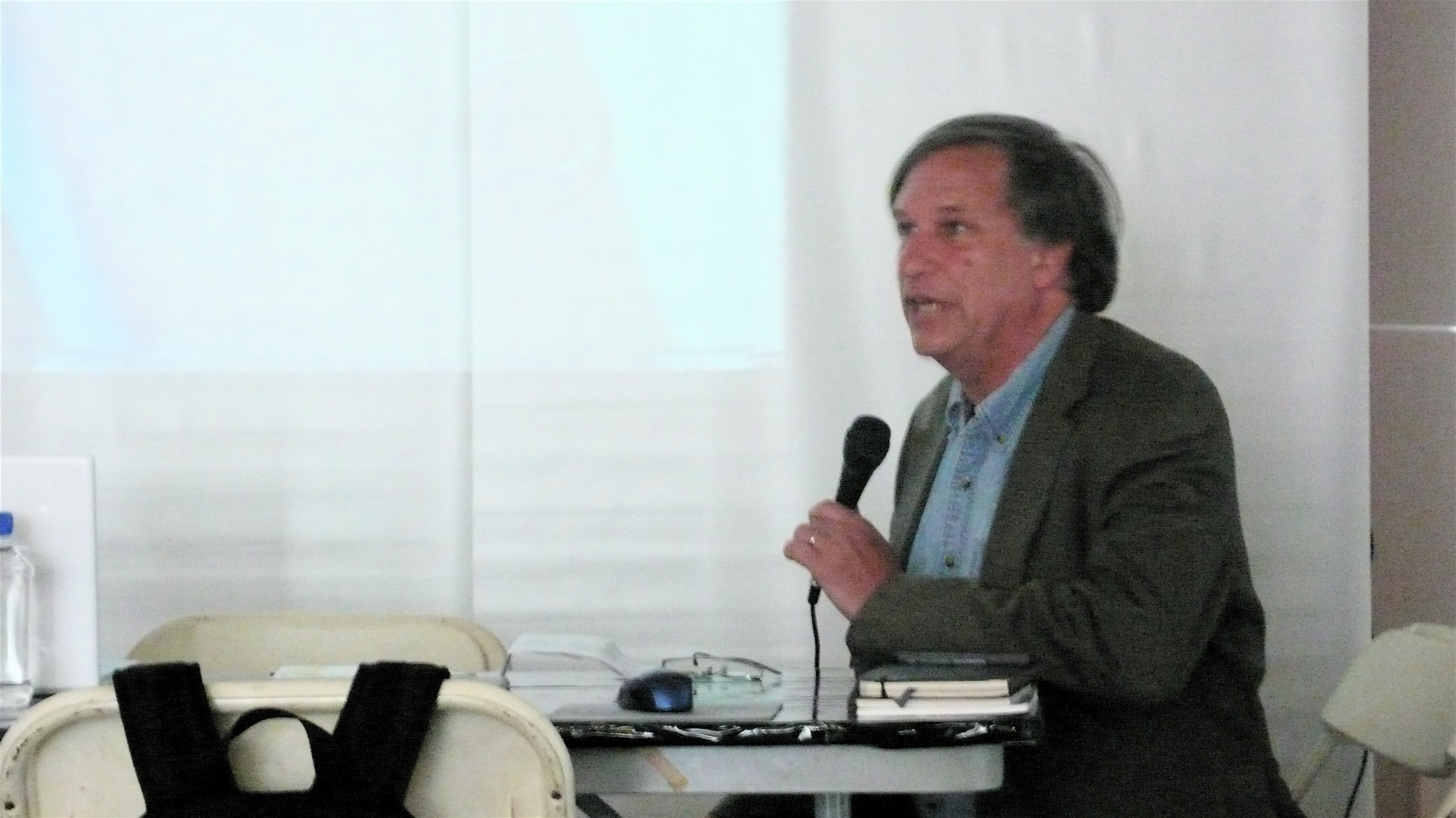
Krulwich at "Postopolis!" in 2005

Robert Louis Krulwich (born August 5, 1947) is a retired American radio and television journalist who co-hosted the radio show Radiolab and served as a science correspondent for NPR. He has reported for ABC, CBS, and Pacifica, with assignment pieces for ABC's Nightline and World News Tonight, as well as PBS's Frontline, NOVA, and NOW with Bill Moyers. TV Guide called him "the most inventive network reporter in television", and New York Magazine wrote that he's "the man who simplifies without being simple."

== Early career ==
Krulwich earned a bachelor's degree in U.S. history from Oberlin College in 1969, followed by a Juris Doctor degree from Columbia Law School in 1974. Just two months later, he abandoned his pursuit of a career in law to cover the Watergate hearings for Pacifica Radio. In 1976, he became the Washington D.C. bureau chief for Rolling Stone magazine.

From 1978 to 1985, Krulwich was the business and economics correspondent for NPR. Among other creative efforts, he recorded an opera called Rato Interesso to explain interest rates. He went on to host the PBS arts series Edge.

In 1984, Krulwich joined CBS News and appeared regularly on CBS This Morning, 48 Hours, and Nightwatch with Charlie Rose. During the Gulf War, he co-anchored the CBS program America Tonight. In 1994, he joined ABC News.

In 1992, Krulwich appeared as a guest on the first episode of The Tonight Show with Jay Leno. Critic Tom Shales panned Krulwich's appearance, describing him as "the Big Bird of economics."

Annually through the 1990s, he hosted a semi-fictional year-in-review program called Backfire for NPR. In 1995, at the invitation of President Bill Clinton and First Lady Hillary Clinton, Krulwich recorded a live show at the White House with the rest of the “Backfire” team.

In 1999, Krulwich hosted an eight-part prime-time series for ABC's Nightline called Brave New World (which frequently featured his friends, They Might Be Giants, as musical guests).

In 2004, Krulwich became the host and managing editor of the innovative PBS science program NOVA scienceNOW. The show often tackled science stories considered too complex for television, sometimes using cartoons and musical production numbers to illustrate abstract concepts.

In 2005, Krulwich re-established a relationship with NPR, where he made regular contributions to several programs on science topics, while continuing to produce occasional segments for ABC News. By early 2006, with several projects going at once, Krulwich decided to end his work on NOVA scienceNOW after only five episodes.

Krulwich regularly moderates discussions on scientific topics at the 92nd Street Y in New York City. His presentations at the Jewish Community Center (YMHA) have featured such prominent scientists as Brian Greene and James D. Watson.

He was a regular correspondent on the PBS investigative series Frontline.

From mid-2004 to January 2020 Krulwich co-hosted the Radiolab program with Jad Abumrad.

Krulwich has a prominent role in the 2021 feature documentary film Objects as a proponent of recognizing the importance of seemingly useless keepsakes for their history and personal meaning.

== Retirement ==
On December 5, 2019, Krulwich announced via the Radiolab email newsletter that he would be retiring from Radiolab, though specifying it would not be immediate. His last episode aired on January 30, 2020. Krulwich said he planned to use his retirement to work on collaborations including a documentary about Oliver Sacks with Ric Burns and a project about photographer Anand Varma's cultivation of jellyfish.

== Awards and honors ==
In his Frontline role, he has won an Alfred I. duPont–Columbia University Award for his coverage of campaign finance in the 1992 U.S. presidential campaign; a national Emmy Award for his investigation of privacy on the Internet, High Stakes in Cyberspace; and a George Polk Award for an hour on the savings and loan scandal. His ABC special on Barbie also won an Emmy.

He has received a multitude of other awards for his reporting, including the Extraordinary Communicator Award from the National Cancer Institute in 2000, four consecutive Gainsbrugh Awards from the Economics Broadcasting Association, and the American Association for the Advancement of Science Excellence in Television Award in 2001 for a NOVA special on the human genome. He also won the 2001 AAAS Science Journalism Award for his NOVA special, Cracking the Code of Life.

TV Guide named Krulwich to its "all-star reporting team." He was included in Esquire's "Registry of Outstanding Men and Women" in 1989.

In 2010, WNYC received a Peabody Award for Radiolab.

== Personal life ==
Krulwich lives in New York City and Shelter Island, New York, with his wife, Tamar Lewin, a national reporter for The New York Times. They have two children.

The couple was featured in Act 2 of Episode 226 ("Reruns") of the Chicago Public Radio program This American Life, recounting their separate (and divergent) accounts of an event in their lives.

Krulwich is an improv comedian who performed with his troupe at the White House in 1995.
