= Business Wars =

Business Wars may refer to:

- Business Wars (video game), a text adventure video game
- Business Wars (podcast), a podcast hosted by David Brown
- Business war games, gaming up business as practice
