= Hernan Lopez (entrepreneur) =

American-Argentine entrepreneur and media executive

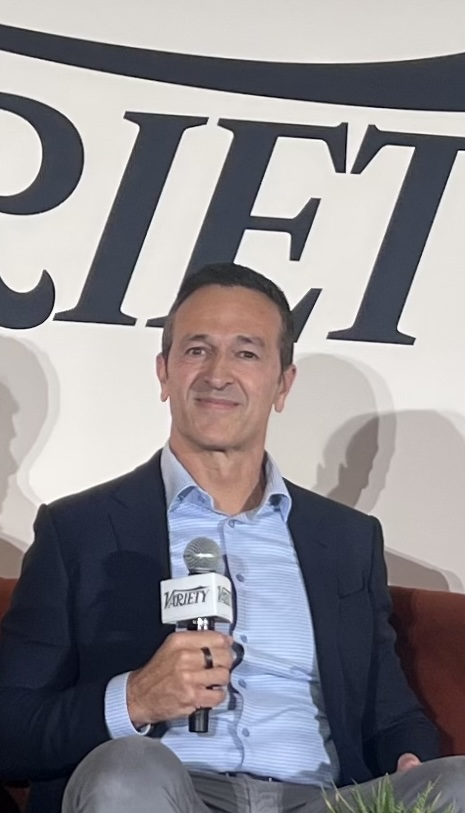
- Lopez at the 2024 Variety Entertainment & Tech Summit
- Citizenship: American and Argentine
- Occupations: Entrepreneur and Media executive
- Years active: 2000-present
- Known for: Fox International Channels and Wondery

Hernan Lopez is an Argentine-American entrepreneur and media executive. He was the president and chief executive officer of Fox International Channels from 2011 to 2016 and later founded the American podcast company Wondery. Amazon acquired Wondery in 2021 in a deal reportedly valued at $300 million. Wondery produced series including Dirty John and Dr. Death. In 2024, he founded the management consulting firm, Owl & Co.

== Early life ==
Lopez was born in Argentina and moved to the U.S. in his late 20s. He holds a Master of Business Administration from the University of Miami.

== Career ==
=== Fox ===
Before founding Wondery, Lopez spent sixteen years at Fox International Channels. He was promoted to Senior Vice President and Managing Director of Fox Latin America in 2000. He later became President of Fox Latin America and General Manager for the United Kingdom operations before being appointed President and CEO of Fox International Channels in 2011.

During his tenure, the company grew annual revenue from $100 million in 2002 to $3 billion. As CEO, Lopez oversaw Fox's international television business during a period of global expansion, growing the company's portfolio of entertainment, factual, and sports channels across Europe, Latin America, Asia, Africa, and the Middle East. He also led the global rollout of television shows such as" The Walking Dead."

=== Wondery ===
In 2016, Lopez founded Wondery, a VC backed podcast network that produced shows such as Dirty John, Dr. Death, and Business Wars.

By 2019, the company listed 82 podcasts on its roster, roughly half of which was original content and grew to become one of the largest independent podcast publishers in the United States.

Several Wondery podcasts were subsequently adapted for television. Adaptations of its podcasts included Dirty John, Dr. Death, The Shrink Next Door,WeCrashed, American Sports Story and the Peabody award-winning and Emmy-nominated Dying for Sex. Lopez served as an executive producer on many of the adaptations.

In 2020, Lopez co-founded The Podcast Academy, a professional organization for podcast creators and industry professionals. The organization established the Ambies Awards, recognizing excellence in podcasting.

On December 30, 2020, Amazon announced it would acquire Wondery under their Amazon Music division in a deal reportedly valued at around $300 million. When Amazon's acquisition of Wondery was completed on February 10, 2021, Lopez stepped down and was succeeded by Wondery's then COO, Jen Sargent.

=== Owl & Co ===
In 2024, Lopez launched management consulting firm Owl & Co, a company focused on economics for media and entertainment businesses. The firm publishes original research on streaming, the attention economy, podcasting, creator businesses, and emerging forms of digital media. In 2025, the firm published research estimating the global podcast economy at $7.3 billion; a subsequent report estimated that global podcast revenue reached $9.2 billion in 2025.

In 2026, Lopez organized the Vertical Media Summit in Los Angeles and argued that vertical video should be a distinct "third audiovisual language," sizing the vertical market at $150B globally excluding China.

== Legal proceedings ==
Lopez was charged in April 2020, in connection with an alleged scheme involving payments to soccer officials for broadcasting rights to international soccer tournaments. Lopez pleaded not guilty to the charges. During the trial, Lopez's attorneys challenged aspects of government witness Alejandro Burzaco's testimony, alleging discrepancies between his trial testimony and statements he had previously made to investigators.

In March 2023, a federal jury convicted Lopez on two counts. In September 2023, U.S. District Judge Pamela Chen overturned Lopez's conviction and entered a judgment of acquittal, concluding that the government's legal theory was no longer sustainable following the U.S. Supreme Court's decision in Percoco v. United States.

In July 2025, the U.S. Court of Appeals for the Second Circuit reversed the district court's decision. Lopez subsequently filed a petition for a writ of certiorari with the United States Supreme Court.

In December 2025, the U.S. Department of Justice moved to dismiss with prejudice the case against Lopez stating that dismissal was "in the interests of justice."

On May 27, 2026, Judge Chen granted the government's request and dismissed the indictment against Lopez.

== Personal life ==
Lopez married Scott Velasquez at Hollywood Studios in 2023. He lives in Los Angeles with his children and husband.

Lopez founded the Hernan Lopez Family Foundation, a 501(c)(3) nonprofit that supports rising professionals and entrepreneurs through grants, training and mentorship.
