= List of podcast adaptations =

Podcasts have been increasingly adapted into other forms of media such as television shows, films, and books.

Below is a list of podcasts that have been adapted into other forms of media or inspired the development of them.

== List ==
| Podcast | Format | Title of adapted work | Year of release of adapted work | Ref |
|---|---|---|---|---|
| StartUp | Television | Alex, Inc. | 2018 | |
| Pants on Fire | Television | The Big Fib | 2020 | |
| Comedy Bang Bang | Television | Comedy Bang Bang | 2012 | |
| Dirty John | Television | Dirty John | 2018 | |
| Dr. Death | Television | Dr. Death | 2021 | |
| The Dropout | Television | The Dropout | 2022 | |
| Homecoming | Television | Homecoming | 2018 | |
| Fight Night and the Million Dollar Heist | Television | Fight Night: The Million Dollar Heist | 2024 | |
| My Brother, My Brother, and Me | Television | My Brother, My Brother, and Me | 2017 | |
| WeCrashed: The Rise and Fall of WeWork | Television | WeCrashed | 2022 | |
| Limetown | Television | Limetown | 2019 | |
| Limetown | Book | Limetown | 2018 | |
| Lore | Television | Lore | 2017 | |
| Lore | Book | The World of Lore: Monstrous Creatures; The World of Lore: Wicked Mortals; The World of Lore: Dreadful Places | | |
| The Duncan Trussell Family Hour | Television | The Midnight Gospel | 2020 | |
| Ricky Gervais Show | Television | Ricky Gervais Show | 2010 | |
| StarTalk | Television | StarTalk | 2015 | |
| Serial | Television | The Case Against Adnan Sayed | 2019 | |
| The Parapod | Film | The Parapod Movie/The Parapod: A Very British Ghost Hunt | 2020 | |
| SModCast | Film | Tusk | 2014 | |
| Slow Burn | Television | Slow Burn | 2020 | |
| Slow Burn | Television | Gaslit | 2022 | |
| Slow Burn | Television | Impeachment: American Crime Story | 2021 | |
| 99% Invisible | Book | The 99% Invisible City: A Field Guide To The Hidden World Of Everyday Design | 2020 | |
| Sawbones | Book | The Sawbones Book: The Horrifying, Hilarious Road To Modern Medicine | 2018 | |
| 2 Dope Queens | Television | 2 Dope Queens | 2018 | |
| The Shrink Next Door | Television | The Shrink Next Door | 2021 | |
| Song Exploder | Television | Song Exploder | 2020 | |
| Archive 81 | Television | Archive 81 | 2022 | |
| The Thing About Pam | Television | The Thing About Pam | 2022 | |
| Boomtown | Television | Landman | 2024 | |
| The Horror of Dolores Roach | Television | The Horror of Dolores Roach | 2024 | |
| Happy Face | Television | Happy Face | 2025 | |
| WTF with Marc Maron | Book | Waiting for the Punch | 2017 | |
| Shipworm | Film | Control | TBD | |
| The Edge of Sleep | Book | The Edge of Sleep: A Novel | 2023 | |
| The Edge of Sleep | Television | The Edge of Sleep | 2024 | |
| American Hostage | Television | American Hostage | 2026 | |
| Wild Things: Siegfried & Roy | Television | Wild Things | 2027 | |
