= List of film and television podcasts =

The following is a list of film and television podcasts.

== List ==
Podcast	Year	Starring, Narrator(s), or Host(s)	Produced by	Ref
Black List Table Reads	2013–2017	Franklin Leonard	AfterBuzz TV	
What Went Wrong	2020-present	Chris Winterbauer and Lizzie Bassett	Sad Boom Media	
Black Men Can't Jump [In Hollywood]	2015–present	Jonathan Braylock, Jerah Milligan, and James III	Forever Dog	
Box Angeles	2013–present	Mike Elder	Independent	
Box seat		Stefan Kuhlmann		
The Canon	2014–2018	Devin Faraci and Amy Nicholson	Earwolf	
Cinema Junkie	2015–present	Beth Accomando	KPBS, NPR	
The CineHistorians Podcast	2024–present	Carl Sweeney and Raquel Stecher	Film Stories Podcast Network	
CUTS		Christian Eichler		
DC TV Podcasts	2020–present	Hosts of other DC podcasts		
Drama Queens	2021–present	Sophia Bush, Hilarie Burton, Bethany Joy Lenz	iHeartRadio	
Every Horror Movie On Netflix	2017–present	Chris, Patrick, and Steve	Independent	
Feminist Frequency Radio	2017–present	Kat Spada and Anita Sarkeesian	Independent	
Film Sack	2009–present	Scott Johnson, Brian Ibbott, Randy Jordan, and Brian Dunaway	Frogpants Network of Podcasts	
Film School Rejects	2021–present	Neil Miller	Anchor	
Filmspotting	2005–present	Adam Kempenaar and Josh Larsen	Public Radio Exchange	
Flix Forum	2018–present	Jesse D Nugent and Matt Jeffries	Independent	
Ghibliotheque	2018–present	Michael Leader and Jake Cunningham	Acast	
Girls on Film	2018–present	Anna Smith	Independent	
Gilbert Gottfried's Amazing Colossal Podcast	2008–present	Gilbert Gottfried	Starburns Audio	
Harmontown	2012–2019	Dan Harmon and Jeff Davis	Starburns Audio and Feral Audio	
How Did This Get Made?	2010–present	Paul Scheer, June Diane Raphael, and Jason Mantzoukas	Earwolf	
I Saw What You Did	2020–present	Danielle Henderson and Millie De Chirico	Exactly Right Podcast Network	
The Important Cinema Club	2015–present	Justin Decloux and Will Sloan	Independent	
Inside the Exorcist	2017	Mark Ramsey	Wondery	
Inside Jaws	2018	Mark Ramsey	Wondery	
Inside Psycho	2017	Mark Ramsey	Wondery	
Kermode and Mayo's Film Review	2001–2022	Mark Kermode and Simon Mayo	BBC Radio 5 Live	
Maltin on Movies	2014–present	Leonard Maltin and Jesse Maltin	Independent	
Marvel's Voices	2018-2023	Angélique Roché	Marvel Entertainment	
Monkey Tennis	2016–present	Alan Partridge	POST/POP	
Office Ladies	2019–present	Jenna Fischer and Angela Kinsey	Earwolf	
Pilot TV podcast	2018–present	Terri White, James Dyer, and Boyd Hilton	Empire	
The Plot Thickens	2020–present	Ben Mankiewicz	Turner Classic Movies/Novel	
Podcast Like It's 1999	2017–present	Phil Iscove and Kenny Neibart	Rebel Talk Network	
Pop Culture Happy Hour	2020–present	Linda Holmes, Glen Weldon, Stephen Thompson, and Aisha Harris	NPR	
Profiles with Malone & Mantz	2014–2017	Alicia Malone and Scott Mantz	Popcorn Talk Network	
Still Ugly	2025–Present	Becki Newton and Michael Urie	Rabbit Grin Productions	
The Projection Booth	2011–Present	Mike White	Independent	
The Q&A with Jeff Goldsmith	2011–present	Jeff Goldsmith	Independent	
The Rewatchables	2021–present	Bill Simmons, Van Lathan, Chris Ryan, Sean Fennessey, and Amanda Dobbins	The Ringer	
Switchblade Sisters	2017–2021	April Wolf	Maximum Fun	
Talking Pictures	2023–present	Ben Mankiewicz	Turner Classic Movies/Max	
TV Avalanche	2018	Alan Sepinwall and Brian Grubb	Uproxx	
Unspooled	2018–present	Amy Nicholson and Paul Scheer	SiriusXM	
Watch What Crappens	2012–present	Ben Mandelker and Ronnie Karam	Wondery	
Welcome to Our Show	2022–present	Zooey Deschanel, Lamorne Morris, Hannah Simone	iHeartRadio	
You Must Remember This	2014–present	Karina Longworth	Independent	
Let's Make	2022—2023	Ryan Beil, Maddy Kelly, and Mark Chavez	Kelly & Kelly and the CBC	
