= Criminology (disambiguation) =

Criminology is the interdisciplinary study of crime and deviant behaviour.

Criminology may also refer to:

- Criminology (journal), a quarterly academic journal
- Criminology (podcast), an American true crime podcast
- "Criminology" (song), by Raekwon, 1995
