= The Shrink Next Door (miniseries) =

2021 American television miniseries

- Promotional poster
- Genre: Black comedy; Psychological drama
- Based on: The Shrink Next Door by Joe Nocera
- Developed by: Georgia Pritchett
- Showrunner: Georgia Pritchett
- Directed by: Michael Showalter; Jesse Peretz
- Starring: Will Ferrell; Paul Rudd; Kathryn Hahn; Casey Wilson; Cornell Womack
- Music by: Joshua Moshier
- Country of origin: United States
- Original language: English
- No. of episodes: 8

Production
- Executive producers: Georgia Pritchett; Will Ferrell; Jessica Elbaum; Brittney Segal; Paul Rudd; Michael Showalter; Jordana Mollick; Hernan Lopez; Marshall Lewy; Aaron Hart; Jared Sandberg; Katie Boyce; Francesca Levy
- Producer: David Auge
- Cinematography: Michelle Lawler
- Editors: Nathan Gunn; Liza Cardinale; Eileen de Klerk
- Running time: 35–49 minutes
- Production companies: Gloria Sanchez Productions; Buckaroo; Small Mammal Productions; Semi-Formal Productions; Bloomberg Media; Wondery; Civic Center Media; MRC Television

Original release
- Network: Apple TV+
- Release: November 12 – December 17, 2021

The Shrink Next Door is an American psychological black comedy-drama miniseries developed by Georgia Pritchett based on the podcast of the same title by Joe Nocera. The miniseries premiered on Apple TV+ on November 12, 2021. The podcast and TV series are both based on the real life story of psychologist Isaac Herschkopf, who in 2021 was determined by New York's Department of Health to have violated "minimal acceptable standards of care in the psychotherapeutic relationship".

== Premise ==
Psychiatrist Dr. Ike Herschkopf inserts himself into the life of one of his patients, Marty Markowitz.

== Cast ==
=== Main ===
- Will Ferrell as Martin "Marty" Markowitz
- Paul Rudd as Dr. Isaac "Ike" Herschkopf
- Kathryn Hahn as Phyllis Shapiro
- Casey Wilson as Bonnie Herschkopf
- Cornell Womack as Bruce

=== Recurring ===
- Sarayu Blue as Miriam
- Robin Bartlett as Cathy
- Gable Swanlund as Nancy
- Richard Aaron Anderson as Joel
- Allan Wasserman as Rabbi Sherman
- Christina Vidal as Hannah

=== Guest ===
- Lindsey Kraft as Deborah
- Lisa Rinna as herself
- Carlos Lacámara as Benny
- Annie Korzen as Esther
- Mindy Sterling as Mrs. Zicherman

== Episodes ==
No.	Title	Directed by	Written by	Original release date
1	"The Consultation"	Michael Showalter	Georgia Pritchett	November 12, 2021
In 1982 Martin "Marty" Markowitz visits Dr. Isaac "Ike" Herschkopf under the advice of his sister, Phyllis Shapiro, to help with his anxiety attacks and grief after their parents' recent deaths. Ike's unconventional method manages to help Marty as he takes him outside to play basketball and eat lunch, and he helps Marty with a problem concerning his recently broken-up girlfriend. Satisfied with his first session, Marty decides to return while also forming a bond with Ike. In 2010 Ike hosts a party at a large house, while later in the night, the caretaker vandalizes the backyard in anger and frustration. The caretaker is revealed to be Marty.
2	"The Ceremony"	Michael Showalter	Stuart Zicherman	November 12, 2021
Nearing Marty's 40th birthday, Ike suggests he have a second bar mitzvah as Marty had not enjoyed his first due to anxiety and stomach problems. Phyllis, however, is against the idea, believing it will dishonor the memories of their parents. Marty and Ike go ahead with it anyway and Phyllis complains to her rabbi, causing him to lodge a complaint to Ike's rabbi, who, in turn, warns him about it. Marty later berates Phyllis and they have an argument. On his birthday, Marty proceeds with the second bar mitzvah, though most of the people who show up are Ike's wife and friends. Meanwhile, Phyllis, believing Marty will abandon the idea, prepares his birthday celebration with her kids, only to be left in tears when Marty doesn't show.
3	"The Treatment"	Michael Showalter	Ethan Kuperberg	November 12, 2021
Phyllis asks Marty to open the family's trust fund so she can hire a better lawyer during her divorce. Ike gives Marty a business opportunity when a Broadway show requires his help to make a large curtain for the stage. The curtain ends up costing too much, and Marty's staff are unenthusiastic at solving the problem. Marty brings Ike to the company to motivate them, and they manage to solve the issue. Alarmed at the increasing closeness between the two, Phyllis visits Ike for a session, which ends badly. Marty later gets into another argument with her and refuses to unlock the trust. While Marty is out with Ike, Phyllis visits his apartment but becomes angered at seeing how close her brother is to Ike. She then robs their parents' jewels from his vault. Returning home and reading Phyllis' message, Marty calls Ike and asks for help, in the process revealing his large inheritance. Realizing the extent of Marty's wealth, Ike inserts himself into Marty's life even further.
4	"The Foundation"	Michael Showalter	Adam Countee	November 19, 2021
Marty cuts Phyllis out of his life and hires Ike as a consultant at the fabric company, annoying the company staff. Ike becomes a father to twin girls, but refuses to hire help even as his wife, Bonnie, becomes overwhelmed. This prompts her to hire the help anyway using her own money. Under Ike's influence, Marty starts a foundation with him, mostly using Marty's money. Marty later scores a date with Hannah, a girl who works at a frame shop that he and Ike often visit. Ike suggests taking her out to an expensive charity gala on a date. During the gala, both Hannah and Marty become uncomfortable at Ike's blatant claims and his irresponsible use of Marty's money. The night ends with Marty having a heart attack and being hospitalized after Ike spends $20,000 of Marty's money during an auction. Ike later warns Hannah that she should let go of Marty for the good of his recovery.
5	"The Family Tree"	Jesse Peretz	Georgia Pritchett & Catherine Shepherd	November 25, 2021
In 1990 Ike's father passes away. Marty is invited to the funeral and offers Ike's family to stay in his Hamptons house for the weekend. Ike begins taking over the house, convincing Marty to redecorate, having him sleep in the guest house instead of the master bedroom, and extending his stay in the house indefinitely as he plans on writing his novel, while making Marty type it on his own. Disliking a large tree in the backyard, Ike tries to have Marty chop it down, but he refuses as it was a tree that his parents planted when they bought the house. Ike becomes angered and threatens to leave, forcing Marty to chop down the tree later in the night to salvage his relationship with him. One year later, under Ike's advice, Marty buys the property next door and combines it with the house.
6	"The Party"	Jesse Peretz	Georgia Pritchett & Sas Goldberg	December 3, 2021
Ike begins throwing a series of parties at Marty's Hamptons house, while making Marty serve his guests. In 1997 Marty witnesses Bonnie break down during one of the parties, saying that she doesn't recognize her husband anymore. In 2007, during another party, Marty meets with Miriam, another of Ike's patients. She tells him about how Ike previously convinced her to cut off her relationship with her own mother, which she deeply regrets as she missed her death. While in town, Marty meets with a neighbor who talks about Phyllis' current life, making him realize how much he missed over the last few years. He attempts to run away from Ike but can't bring himself to do so. While heading back to the city, Miriam's bus suddenly breaks down; however, it is revealed to be a ploy by Ike to strand Miriam at a nearby gas station while he cuts her off, stating that she is a toxic person.
7	"The Breakthrough"	Jesse Peretz	Catherine Shepherd & Sas Goldberg	December 10, 2021
In 2010 Ike angrily refuses a plan to move the foundation to New Jersey to keep it from going under. Marty is diagnosed with a hernia and undergoes surgery. Ike never visits him during his recovery. Marty escapes the hospital after four days and confronts Ike, finding out that he was hosting another party at the Hamptons house. Ike attempts to convince Marty that he did everything he could to help him, but when Marty finds out one of his koi fish has died as a result of Ike's neglect, he breaks down in front of Bonnie, saying he can't do it anymore. Later that night, Marty begins vandalizing the backyard as seen in the first episode. When Marty misses his next therapy session, Ike tries to contact him, only to find that he has moved the foundation to New Jersey without his knowledge. Ike confronts him but is fired from the foundation by Marty as a result.
8	"The Verdict"	Jesse Peretz	Georgia Pritchett	December 17, 2021
Marty returns to therapy with Ike, wanting to give him another chance. Ike continues with his old ways by having Marty as his best man at the renewal of his wedding vows, even though he and Bonnie have been separated for years. Marty tries to reconnect with Phyllis through her daughter, Nancy, but she angrily rebuffs him. When Marty finds out that the reason Hannah never called him back was because of Ike, he cuts off contact with him for good. Phyllis later confronts Marty approaching Nancy, but she ends up reconciling with him. Ike shows up while Marty and Phyllis are burning his stuff from the house, attempting to convince him again about Phyllis' toxicity. Marty finally stands up for himself and tells him to leave. One year later, Marty has fully reconnected with Phyllis and her family. He has also sued Ike in an attempt to get his license revoked. Ike tries to insert himself back into Marty's life one last time, but Marty, now immune to him, says he feels absolutely nothing. The textual epilogue shows that Ike's license was eventually revoked in 2021, and that Marty has never returned to therapy.

== Production ==
It was announced in February 2020 that a television adaptation of the podcast The Shrink Next Door was in development, in which Will Ferrell and Paul Rudd would star. The series was greenlit and ordered by Apple TV+ in April. Kathryn Hahn and Casey Wilson were added as leads in November, with Sarayu Blue cast in a recurring role in February 2021.

Filming began in November 2020 in Los Angeles, and finished in March 2021 amid the COVID-19 Pandemic.

== Reception ==
On Rotten Tomatoes the series has an approval rating of 58% based on 62 reviews, with an average rating of 6.4/10. The site's critical consensus reads: "The Shrink Next Door is a cookie full of perhaps too much arsenic, but Will Ferrell and Paul Rudd prove they're as capable of conjuring disquiet as they are laughs." Metacritic, which uses a weighted average, assigned a score of 61 out of 100 based on 29 critics, indicating "generally favorable reviews".

== See also ==
- List of podcast adaptations
