= Blood Ties (podcast) =

Fictional crime podcast by Wondery

Creative team
- Created by: Wondery

Related
- Website: wondery.com/shows/blood-ties/

Blood Ties is a fictional crime podcast by Wondery starring Josh Gad and Gillian Jacobs.

== Background ==
The podcast is a fictional crime show produced by Wondery. The show stars Josh Gad and Gillian Jacobs. The podcast hit number one on the Apple Podcasts chart when the show debuted in December 2019. The show follows siblings Eleonore and Michael who have lost their parents in a plane crash. Season two of the podcast won Best Fiction Podcast at the 2020 Ambies. Elena Fernández Collins criticized the show for how it addresses the MeToo movement.
