= Farid Fata =

Lebanese-American health care fraudster (born 1965)

Farid Tanios Fata
- Born: 1965 (age 60–61); Lebanon
- Occupations: Hematologist, oncologist (former)
- Spouse: Samar Fata (divorced)
- Status: Incarcerated
- Conviction: September 20, 2014 (pleaded guilty)
- Criminal charges: Health care fraud (18 U.S.C. § 1347) (13 counts); Conspiracy to pay or receive kickbacks (42 U.S.C. § 1320a–7b); Money laundering (18 U.S.C. § 1956)
- Penalty: 45 years imprisonment

Details
- Imprisoned at: FCI Greenville; earliest possible release December 11, 2050

Farid Tanios Fata (Arabic: فريد طانيوس فتى, born 1965) is a Lebanese-born former hematologist/oncologist and the man behind of one of the largest health care frauds in U.S. history. Fata was the owner of Michigan Hematology-Oncology (MHO), one of the largest cancer practices in Michigan. He was arrested in 2013 on charges of prescribing chemotherapy to patients who were healthy or whose condition did not warrant chemotherapy, then submitting $34 million in fraudulent charges to Medicare and private health insurance companies over a period of at least six years.

Fata pleaded guilty in 2014 to charges of health care fraud, conspiring to pay and receive kickbacks, and money laundering. On July 10, 2015, he was sentenced to 45 years in federal prison.

== Early life and career ==
Farid Fata was born in Lebanon in 1965, to a Melkite Catholic family. After obtaining a medical degree there in 1992, he emigrated to the United States to begin his medical career. Fata served a residency at Maimonides Medical Center in Brooklyn, New York, from 1993 to 1996. He then served as a fellow in hematology–oncology at Memorial Sloan Kettering Cancer Center in Manhattan until 1999. Fata was an attending physician at Geisinger Medical Center in Danville, Pennsylvania, from 2000 to 2003.

Fata struck out on his own in 2003, opening Michigan Hematology–Oncology (MHO) in Rochester Hills, Michigan. Over the next decade, MHO grew to seven locations throughout Metro Detroit—in Rochester Hills, Bloomfield Hills, Clarkston, Sterling Heights, Troy, Lapeer and Oak Park. Fata became a naturalized U.S. citizen in April 2009.

Fata specialized in treating blood cancer. He owned his own laboratory, pharmacy and radiation treatment facility. At its peak, Fata's practice was treating 17,000 patients at its clinics. Fata acquired a sterling reputation as one of the best cancer specialists in the Detroit area. He was known for his aggressive approach to treatment, giving higher doses of chemotherapy drugs at a more frequent rate—a protocol he called "European protocol".

Fata's wife, Samar, helped run the business side of his practice as chief executive officer and chief financial officer of his companies. While authorities believe she was a party to the fraud, she was able to move back to Lebanon after her husband's arrest; they have since divorced.

== Fraud ==
Concerns about Fata cropped up as early as 2007, when Maggie Dorsey sued Fata for malpractice. Dorsey had been diagnosed with cancer in 2004, and seven months of chemotherapy had made it difficult for her to walk. She then learned that she did not have cancer. The case was settled out of court in 2009. In 2010, veteran oncology nurse Angela Swantek went to MHO for an interview, but was stunned to see practices that her experience told her were "plain wrong". Swantek believed that Fata was pumping patients with drugs in hour-long chemotherapy sessions that should normally last much shorter periods, thus allowing him to prescribe unnecessarily high volumes of drugs. Swantek believed Fata was deliberately billing patients' insurance companies for more money, a classic fraud scenario. She complained to state authorities, but got no response until 2011, when she got a form letter under the authority of Bureau of Health Professions Acting Director Rae Ramsdell, of the State of Michigan's Department of Licensing and Regulatory Affairs, saying that there was no evidence to support an investigation into Fata.

In 2013, Fata diagnosed 54-year-old Monica Flagg with multiple myeloma—a condition that required a lifetime of chemo for her to have any chance of survival. On July 1, hours after her first round of chemo, Flagg broke her leg in two places. Fata was on vacation in Lebanon at the time. One of the doctors at MHO, Soe Maunglay, saw Flagg in the hospital that day and was stunned to see that her readings were completely normal. As he put it, he could tell "just by looking at the chart" that Flagg's numbers were not consistent with an active cancer patient.

The next day, Maunglay went to MHO and reviewed Flagg's records, and could find nothing in her test results that could justify a chemo regimen. He later told The Detroit News that myeloma can start with minor changes in blood chemistry—minor enough that a dishonest doctor can use chemo to avoid detection. Maunglay estimated that if another doctor had seen Flagg within two months, she would have appeared to be in remission. He also believed that since Flagg was far healthier on paper than a typical myeloma patient, the insurance payments would continue flowing to Fata for the rest of his life. Maunglay went to see Flagg the following day, and informed her she did not have cancer. He further advised her to get her records right away and find another doctor, and that she should never seek treatment from Fata again.

Maunglay was already due to leave MHO the following month after catching Fata lying about the clinic's enrollment in a professional quality program. However, after discovering that a healthy woman was being given unnecessary chemotherapy, he felt that he needed to stop Fata. Knowing that Flagg's case, even as egregious as it was, would not be enough to shut down Fata's clinic, he needed to find more evidence of misconduct. Maunglay searched MHO's patient records and found numerous instances of unethical and potentially illegal behavior. For instance, Fata was treating several patients with IVIG, a drug intended to treat patients with specific immune deficiencies, when there was no apparent medical basis for it. Maunglay persuaded a nurse and a nurse practitioner to confront Fata. When Fata agreed to curb the use of IVIG, Maunglay believed that this was further evidence that Fata was a fraud. Later, he explained to the News that an honest doctor would never cut back on his own protocol solely because of staff and physician objections.

Several weeks later, the Federal Bureau of Investigation (FBI) stepped in on a tip from George Karadsheh, an MHO office manager. Karadsheh grew suspicious after clinical staff and other doctors began giving their notice without explanation and leaving the practice. When Karadsheh asked Maunglay why he was leaving, he told him that Fata kept insisting on aggressive chemo regimens, even for patients who did not need it. Karadsheh did not believe Maunglay at first, since he was aware of other clinical staff who provided care and oversight. However, Karadsheh recalled that many staff had expressed concerns about Fata's aggressive regimen.

Karadsheh conducted his own investigation and interviewed several staff. The first thing he noticed was that Fata's treatment-to-consultation ratio was different from those of other doctors. Karadsheh went back to Maunglay, who suggested that he check on Fata's use of IVIG. A nurse reported to Karadsheh that she discovered that in one week, 38 out of 40 patients who received IVIG did not need or did not qualify for the drug. She took this information to Maunglay, who disclosed it to Karadsheh during his investigation. Karadsheh took his findings to the Detroit office of the FBI and sued Fata, MHO, and several related entities under the False Claims Act on August 5; he was thus entitled to a significant financial reward. Maunglay said that Karadsheh had done "a great service" because of his past experience detecting fraud. Fata was arrested the next day for health care fraud.

== Indictment ==
Fata was originally held on $170,000 bond. However, federal authorities found evidence that he and his wife had assets of $9 million not yet seized, and feared that the high liquidity of these assets could make him a high flight risk. They persuaded federal judge Sean Cox to raise Fata's bond to $9 million. He was confined to jail pending trial; had he been released, he would have been confined to his home in Oakland Township and barred from practicing medicine.

Federal investigators amassed evidence that Fata had bullied or deceived 553 people into getting chemotherapy treatments they did not need, causing the patients' insurance companies and Medicare to pay $34 million in fraudulent and unnecessary claims. They also found that Fata took kickbacks from two local hospices and poured Medicare and private insurance proceeds into his own diagnostic testing facility, where he ordered unnecessary tests. On the basis of these findings, Barbara McQuade, the United States Attorney for the Eastern District of Michigan, obtained a series of superseding indictments against Fata. They culminated in a 23-count indictment charging Fata with health care fraud, conspiracy to take and receive kickbacks, money laundering, and unlawfully procuring naturalization. The last charge was added because McQuade contended Fata had concealed the extent of his fraud from immigration authorities when he applied for citizenship. If he had been convicted on all charges, Fata would have faced a maximum of 175 years in prison, plus the prospect of having his naturalization revoked.

== Guilty plea ==
Facing the prospect of spending the rest of his life in prison and the prospect of deportation to Lebanon if he were ever released, Fata pleaded guilty before federal judge Paul Borman on September 20, 2014. He pleaded guilty to thirteen counts of health care fraud, one count of conspiracy to pay and receive kickbacks, and two counts of money laundering. In return, the immigration charges were dropped. Nonetheless, McQuade sought the maximum possible sentence of 175 years in prison. Her office denounced Fata as "the most egregious fraudster in the history of this country", calling his crimes more egregious than those of Bernie Madoff.

== Sentencing ==
Fata's sentencing hearing began on July 3, 2015. At the hearing, dozens of Fata's victims revealed how the unnecessary chemotherapy treatments had harmed them. For example, Robert Sobieray lost nearly all of his teeth after being falsely diagnosed with blood cancer and still twitched uncontrollably. Patty Hester lost much of her hair after being falsely told she was terminally ill with myelodysplastic syndrome, and the stress of finding out about Fata's deceit gave her high blood pressure. Another patient, "C. C.", said that due to 177 unnecessary chemo treatments, she had problems with her bladder, bowel and kidneys so serious that she could no longer perform basic tasks.

On July 10, 2015, Fata addressed the court for the first time. He said he was "horribly ashamed" of his behavior, and admitted giving in to a "self-destructive" quest for power and wealth. Borman was unmoved and sentenced Fata to 45 years in prison, saying that Fata had committed "huge, horrific" crimes. The sentence Borman imposed is barely one-fourth of what prosecutors sought, and was deemed insufficient by many of Fata's victims. Nonetheless, since federal sentencing guidelines require an offender to serve at least 85 percent of their sentences, at his age Fata will likely die in prison. McQuade publicly thanked Maunglay and Karadsheh for exposing what she described as "the most serious fraud case in the history of the country". Fata also faces myriad civil suits. Karadsheh announced in January 2016 that he had reached a $1.7 million settlement. Maunglay, who did not file a lawsuit, will not take any financial reward.

Fata is serving his sentence at Federal Correctional Institution, Greenville in Greenville, Illinois. His earliest possible release will be December 11, 2050, when he will be 85 years old.

Fata filed a 28 U.S.C. §2255 motion requesting that his guilty plea be tossed in May 2018, based on the assertion that he received poor legal advice that resulted in his guilty plea and that he has always maintained his innocence, despite his admission of guilt during his sentencing hearing. He stated in the filing, "...my guilty pleas were not the result of my actually being guilty. From day one to the present, I have steadfastly maintained my innocence.". The District Court rejected Fata's motion on May 27, 2020, after determining that Fata had submitted forged documents, and denied him a certificate of appealability. His attempt to obtain a certificate of appealability was denied by the appeals court in November 2020.

== Other ==
Fata's story was featured in the first half of the September 2016 episode "Diagnosis: Blood Money / Chicago Jailbreak", of the crime series American Greed. A 2018 episode of Whistleblower covered the Fata case, with an emphasis on Karadsheh's and Maungley's roles in exposing the fraud. In 2020, Fata became the subject of season 2 of the podcast Dr. Death.
