= The Shrink Next Door =

True crime podcast

- Genre: True crime

Cast and voices
- Hosted by: Joe Nocera

Publication
- No. of seasons: 1
- No. of episodes: 6+8
- Original release: May 21, 2019 – December 17, 2021
- Provider: Wondery

Related
- Adaptations: The Shrink Next Door (miniseries)
- Website: The Shrink Next Door – Wondery

The Shrink Next Door is a podcast by Wondery that tells the story of Isaac Herschkopf, a psychiatrist who abused his relationship with his patients to exploit them for personal gain. The podcast was written and hosted by Joe Nocera. The podcast premiered on May 21, 2019, and consists of 14 episodes.

== Episodes ==
No.	Title	Original release date
1	"Welcome to the Neighborhood"	May 21, 2019
2	"Sibling Rivalry"	May 21, 2019
3	"Easy Mark Markowitz"	May 23, 2019
4	"The Familia"	May 28, 2019
5	"The Last Straw"	June 4, 2019
6	"What Did I Do To You?"	June 11, 2019
7	"Update"	June 18, 2019
8	"Charged"	August 7, 2019
9	"My Dinner With Ike"	July 14, 2020
10	"The Decision"	April 22, 2021
11	"Interview with Will Ferrell and Paul Rudd"	November 12, 2021
12	"Interview with Kathryn Hahn and Casey Wilson"	November 19, 2021
13	"How Michael Showalter Translated the Podcast to the TV Screen"	December 3, 2021
14	"How Georgia Pritchett Filled in the Blanks"	December 17, 2021

== Reception ==
The Shrink Next Door was the number one podcast for three weeks straight on Apple's podcast charts. It won the 2020 Webby Award for Documentary in the category Podcasts.

== TV adaptation ==
On April 23, 2020, it was announced that Apple Inc. had given a straight-to-series order for an 8-episode limited series based on The Shrink Next Door for Apple TV+, and it began airing on November 12, 2021. The adaptation is written by Emmy winning writer Georgia Pritchett and directed by Michael Showalter. Dr. Isaac Herschkopf is played by Paul Rudd, and Martin Markowitz is played by Will Ferrell.

== See also ==
- Dr. Death (podcast)
- Psychiatric survivors movement
- List of American crime podcasts
- List of podcast adaptations
