= Limetown =

Horror and sci-fi podcast

- Language: English

Creative team
- Created by: Zack Akers, Skip Bronkie, Dave Yim
- Written by: Zack Akers, Chris Littler, Dan Moyer
- Directed by: Zack Akers

Cast and voices
- Voices: Annie-Sage Whitehurst

Production
- Production: Skip Bronkie

Publication
- No. of seasons: 2
- No. of episodes: 11
- Original release: July 29, 2015

Reception
- Cited as: Vulture's Top 10 Podcasts of 2015

Related
- Adaptations: Limetown (TV series)
- Website: twoupproductions.com/limetown/podcast

Limetown is a scripted podcast fiction series, created by Two-Up Productions, that debuted on July 29, 2015, and became the number one US podcast on iTunes less than two months later. The show has drawn comparisons to the popular podcast Serial and the 1990s television show The X-Files. The series was written and directed by Zack Akers and produced by Skip Bronkie. The second season debuted on October 30, 2018.

== Awards ==
Award	Year	Category	Result	Ref.
Academy of Podcasters Awards	2016	Best Fiction Podcast	Won	
iHeartRadio Podcast Awards	2020	Best Fiction Podcast	Nominated	

== Plot ==
Limetown is a fictional story told as a series of investigative reports by Lia Haddock (played by Annie-Sage Whitehurst), a journalist for American Public Radio (APR), detailing the disappearance of over 300 people at a neuroscience research facility called Limetown, in Tennessee.

== Episode listing ==
Although the creators planned seven episodes for the first season, only six were produced. Very short teasers were broadcast after some episodes.

Season 1
No.	Title	Release date
1	"What We Know"	July 21, 2015
Ten years ago, Limetown was a self-contained research facility with on-site staff housing. One day, a vague but urgent 911 call brings the police to the front gates, but security doesn't let them past and the first responders are ordered to stand down. After three days, the gates are opened, but the site is devoid of any trace of people, save for what looks like the result of a pyre containing traces of the remains of Oscar Totem, one of the lead researchers. Despite numerous investigations and Congressional inquiries, nothing was ever resolved. Lia Haddock, a reporter for American Public Radio, whose uncle Emile was a Limetown resident, investigates Limetown. She interviews various people, including the loved ones of the missing who believe they're all still alive, to start a dedicated series to the missing people and all who remember them. She receives a call from an alleged survivor who wants to meet with her, alone.
2	"Winona"	September 6, 2015
Lia waits for the alleged Limetown survivor, "Winona". At first, Winona forgets their meeting place and does not remember calling Lia. At Winona's motel room, she recounts to Lia living in Limetown with her husband and daughter, Sylvia, as well as an experience watching a man (whom she refers to as "The Man We Were All There For") perfectly copy the movements of test subjects in another room at the exact same time. He knew she was watching, and sent her a telepathic message to go back home to her family. Winona refuses to answer most of Lia's questions and implies that she has been instructed on what to do and that Lia has a role to play. She refers to the last day of Limetown as "The Panic", the day she was told to leave, again subliminally. Lia surmises that The Man We Were All There For was Oscar Totem, which angers Winona and ends the interview. She gives Lia a phone on which the next survivor will contact her. A man comes to Lia's motel room door late at night, repeatedly smashing his head against the door and bellowing her name. He yells some sort of warning, beats on the door even faster, and then disappears.
–	"A quick apology"	September 26, 2015
Lia gives a formal apology for releasing the recording of the manic man who threatened Lia at her door. The police investigated and found a fatal amount of blood, but the body was never found and presumed to have been taken. Lia justifies with her refusal to be afraid and her insistence the team will move forward, already contacting the next survivor and ready to report with a conversation with them in the next episode.
3	"Napoleon"	October 12, 2015
Lia makes contact with another survivor who calls himself The Reverend, a motivational preacher to people who are dying. He recounts how he was part of an experiment where he and a pig he named Napoleon (after the Animal Farm character), were implanted with devices that shared their emotions. The Reverend recounts their empathic connection, which made the pig the living creature best connected and understanding of him than he's ever experienced otherwise. After Napoleon becomes traumatized and extremely depressed from a false-alarm emergency, The Reverend kills the pig. The Reverend is overcome with an urge to attack himself, and wakes up in the Limetown hospital with the device deactivated and his job demoted. The implant was advanced to further trials. He refused to say more out of fear despite Lia's insistence. He is killed by a drunk driver the next day which Lia finds suspicious. Lia soon receives a threatening call from a strange man on the phone in her mother's house. When her mom reaches the phone, Lia repeatedly orders her to take everyone and hide, to which her mother replies, "Is it happening?", before hanging up.
–	"The 911 call"	October 31, 2015
Lia places a 911 call asking for police to come to a specific address; that of missing survivor Dr Max Finlayson, saying she heard shots over the phone. Against the advice of the operator, she hangs up and drives back. The phone call was leaked to the news and a report is played on the podcast. Lia refuses to answer until the next episode, citing it as "a complicated and perilous situation".
4	"DDoS"	November 2, 2015
Lia is contacted by Max Finlayson, the head neurologist at Limetown. He confirms that the purpose of the facility was to develop and test a cranial implant that would allow mind-to-mind communication. Supplements, regularly taken, help channel the communications. Removal of the implant causes severe brain damage, as was the case with Winona. The device was a success and when Lia asks about The Man We Were All There For, Max refuses to name him and says he was the secret piece to the tech, but he reveals he saw an accordion folder with an embossed hummingbird in Oscar's office, believing that Oscar was secretly planning on selling the technology to a mysterious third party, likely relating to his murder. Max believes that someone is out to kill him. He doesn't know or won't say who killed Oscar and gets personal when Lia accuses him of withholding. After Lia leaves and starts driving back, Max calls her saying "Goodbye, Dorothy", thanking Lia for the two speaking while his home security sirens can be heard in the background. Max is then implying multiple people in the house saying they have a message: "Don't try to run." and then blasts are heard, fully revealing what prompted Lia to call 911.
–	"The central question"	November 17, 2015
Despite the clear danger involved, Lia and APR agree to continue the story and investigation. Lia plays a call to the tipline of the sister of Kenneth, a missing survivor, who insults them and threatens with lawsuits when she orders them to stay away from him. Lia admits she was close to stopping the production, but she was convinced otherwise when she got a call from the next survivor wanting to tell their story: Deirdre Wells, the ex-wife of Finlayson. Lia says after she failed to save Max, she owes Deirdre a meeting for her story to be released.
5	"Scarecrow"	November 23, 2015
Lia meets with Max's ex-wife, Deirdre, despite her bosses insisting on a phone interview. She calls out Max for not telling the whole truth and explains her side of the story. His nickname for her was "Dorothy", in reference to The Wizard of Oz. Oscar offered Max a partnership in Limetown, to which Deirdre accompanied him. Limetown's citizens were the experiment, making a group with implants in them and a control group without. Soon, a rift grew between the two, and the control group began calling themselves "the Old School". Deirdre was without the implant while Max had it, straining their relationship. Originally a compassionate support group, the Old School became more militant over time. Max gets Deirdre the implant in secret. When the Old School realizes this, they riot, which ends with the execution of Oscar Totem at a pyre in the town square. She recalls The Man sending subliminal messages to calm the citizens, and eventually failing. She finally reveals to Lia that The Man was her uncle Emile who was the basis of the implants, saying she must already know. Later, Lia goes through her old things, and finds evidence this is true.
–	"Answers"	December 8, 2015
APR receives a mysterious message offering all the answers to Limetown with a recording of a hiding room in which two people are panicking before being sieged, revealed as official footage of the situation surrounding the famous 911 call from Limetown during The Panic. The recording contains instructions on how and where Lia can meet the next survivor, as well as various conditions, the most prominent one is that the interview must be broadcast live the day it is to happen.
6	"Cost-Benefit Analysis"	December 14, 2015
APR agrees to do a live interview with another survivor, a firm-hired consultant who currently calls herself "Lenore Doogle". Lenore was hired to be the city manager. She worked and spoke with Emile through his testing. She is mailing Lia's producer tapes from Limetown, especially from The Panic. Secretly, she acted as a mole for a mysterious company who wanted the technology for military purposes. She fed information to Oscar in order to convince him to sell out the town and Emile. She left the folder with the hummingbird sticker as a plan to ensure being provided a reward and asylum for selling the technology. When The Panic happened, the Company extracted the implanted people via Limetown's cave system, relocated them around the world, and forced them into silence; killed the Old School; destroyed all the evidence. Lenore reveals that she personally saved one person without the implant under orders: Winona's young daughter Sylvia, warning her over the air, "They know, it's time". Emile is still alive and had contacted her to tell her side of the story, but he has since disappeared and now the Company wants him back. They let Emile lead Lia to talk to survivors as bait to draw out Emile. Lenore takes a suicide pill and hands another to Lia before the door is broken down.
–	"A statement from American Public Radio"	December 15, 2015
APR's Gina Purri announces their decision to stop the investigation into Limetown due to the danger it caused and announces investigations are under way, by APR and the FBI. She reveals Lia has been missing since the final interview and, with an honorary dedication, ends with promising to help rescue Lia, imploring, "Please, pray for Lia Haddock".

Season 2
No.	Title	Original release date
1	"London"	October 30, 2018
Charley Latimore, a fixer, is being held captive and interrogated. The interrogator enquires about her dreams, to which she says she doesn't dream. A ransom message is played, demanding Emile Haddock appear at "the bridge" in exchange for Lia. Next, the interrogator plays recordings of Charley meeting with her potential employer: Eugene Demeter, a nervous wreck over being involved in the conspiracy. Charley reveals she stole the tapes Lenore mailed, ripping the audio from them. She gives them to Eugene. Eugene tells her the name of Lia's captor, Daniel Rassmueller. Lenore covertly commissioned Daniel and Eugene to drop off payments, and Daniel told Eugene that the payments were hush money to Limetown survivors. When Eugene wanted out, Daniel made a veiled threat at his son to keep him working. Charley puts together the timeline of events, how Daniel terrorized Lia, killed the survivors, then kidnapped Lia, surmising Daniel wants Emile, no longer caring about the Company. To Eugene's disbelief, Charley says she's going to kill Daniel and Lia to make the world no longer care and eventually forget the conspiracy. She instructs Eugene to wait for her call. The tape ends with the interrogator getting from Charley that's when she first heard of Daniel. She urges him incredulously to play a tape showing Lenore and Daniel. They discuss how they plan to kill everyone in the town except for Emile, but Daniel has strong objections despite Lenore's apathy. Daniel suddenly says half the town has the tech, so they have to be studied for longer. Lenore, pleased with the option, says Daniel is responsible for the survivors and if they talk about Limetown, he dies with the rest of them, forcing him to agree. The interrogator asks Charley where Lia Haddock is, and she says she can't say.
1.5	"The Alison Recording"	November 5, 2018
The interrogator demands the tape with Alison Haddock, along with other inquiries like "Did you hurt her?". Charley plays the recording on her smartphone. She says Alison was disguising herself and sitting at a bar alone. The recording starts nearing the end of the talk, Alison saying she "broke the deal". She then says she promised to tell Lia everything, but she lied, and there's one thing she left out: Alison saw Emile again, in St. George, Utah. She found Emile by a campfire in the desert, homeless and withered. She begged him to come home, but he kept muttering, "Glass Joe made them swim". Emile mentioned another disaster happened that traumatized him severely, that there is a girl he needs to protect from "Glass Joe" before falling back into his trance. She revealed the girl is Sylvia, "Winona"'s daughter, who was smuggled out by Lenore, Alison shocked and heartbroken when she found out Sylvia was saved. When Charley pressed her further, Alison emotionally snaps back she's grappling for answers, but she failed to save her husband, daughter and Emile and she was let down by her own incapabilities, as well as a hidden uniqueness of hers she implies relates to Limetown and the conspiracy. The recording ends, with Charley confirming she first heard about "Glass Joe" at that time and the bar meet is how she ended up reaching Sylvia next.
2	"Bordeaux"	November 12, 2018
The interrogator plays a tape of Charley finding Sylvia and convincing her to listen by mentioning Emile, especially since she finds out Sylvia knows about Daniel. Sylvia elaborates on how Lenore had her hide all over the world. Sylvia met Emile years later, and he told her Daniel is traveling around the world killing Limetown survivors. Once, when Sylvia was alone, Daniel came and felt around her scalp to see if she had the implant, before disappearing. Before Lenore killed herself on air, she sent Sylvia international identities and supplies. Sylvia lost hope hearing Winona, her damaged and disoriented mother, on the radio special Lia was hosting. When she mentioned the Bridge, Charley pressed her vehemently on what it is. All she knew is that it is in Halifax, Canada, which is where she met Emile. The interrogator pries on what surprised Charley during the talk, and Charley says she was livid Eugene never told her about Daniel's murder spree. The next tape reveals a confrontation she had with Eugene. Charley is further exasperated when she finds out the Bridge is why Lenore resigned. To the interrogator, Charley denies she was afraid of Daniel, and he retorts that she is lying; he has the tape of her screaming. She says a mutilated deer charged at her. The interrogator again asks "Are you ready to tell me where Lia Haddock is?" Charley does not respond, and the interrogator leaves her alone again with the tape of the deer and her screaming on repeat.
2.5	"The Majda Tape"	November 19, 2018
A little girl named Majda is asked to take out a contact in her eye. She sends silent messages saying she is fighting the attempts and angry they want to take it out. She hits her mom and screams when they try some more. Eventually, she relinquishes the contact. She is asked about dreams she's been having by a presiding doctor, and after some hesitation, she implies "he" comes into her dreams and haunts her. She said "he" tells her to do things, which they reply with like when she sneaked walnuts into her dad's breakfast and made him get an allergic reaction. She said "Glass Joe" manipulated her, which is the thing she mentions is in her nightmares. When she is asked who "Glass Joe" is, she starts breathing heavily before she whispers "I am". The tape then ends.
3	"Halifax"	November 26, 2018
The interrogator asks about Maggie Kempner, the only survivor of the Bridge, and plays the tape of Charley meeting Maggie. Charley enters Maggie's house, and Maggie attempts to commit suicide out of fear. Charley disarms her, and reassures her that she is here for information. Maggie thinks that Daniel and Emile are dead from the fire at the Bridge before Charley corrects her. Maggie says she was hired to care for the children on the Bridge, a docked barge. She bonded with Daniel, who was a bodyguard for Emile and at the Bridge with his kids Tyler and Macy. She relays what happened with the Contact, a mind-linking eyewear developed to be tested on everyone on the Bridge, how even the children got it. She noted Daniel being quiet and antisocial but being soft with his children. They all cherished their activities and company together, and often ate together at a restaurant outside the barge called Don Quixote. When Maggie left the barge for a longer period, it had burned in her absence. Lenore told her everyone died, and showed her photos of charred corpses as proof. Maggie signed another NDA and took lump sums so she never reported. She immediately recognized Lenore on the broadcast and shocked by the realization the Bridge stole the tech from the Limetown experiments. She finally gives Charley the info she needs: the dock is at Popes Harbour, still there even after the Bridge is gone. Maggie wants to come with Charley to talk down Daniel, relentless even when Charley threatens her. When Maggie fights more, she's punched out by Charley and the recording ends. Charley reveals she shot Maggie and disguised her death as a suicide, because she didn't want to be followed and compromised.
3.5	"The Cortez KO"	December 3, 2018
An old tape of a boxing match between Daniel and another boxer named Cortez. Daniel throws his signature punches and weakens Cortez, only for Cortez to fight back and beat him down, winning the match ended Daniel's career. The tape ends and is taken out of the player.
4	"The Bridge"	December 10, 2018
The interrogator plays a tape of Charley meeting Daniel. He tells her "Glass Joe" is a family story. When he told his children his wife was killed by a car fire, the children thought "Glass Joe" killed their mom, which led to horrible nightmares. Daniel said he hoped things would change when he got a job in the Company. When he escorted Emile out of the facility, he told Emile what happened, which devastated him. Daniel encouraged Emilie, that the Bridge could be different. If they perfected the technology, another disaster wouldn't happen. Emile, Daniel, and Tyler and Macy arrived on the barge, and they grew closer because Daniel watched over him. Emile got jealous when he wasn't involved, again concerned about Limetown, with Daniel encouraging him once again. Emile made it mandatory everyone got the contact, even the children. The children used the contact for imaginary play and shared dreams, and fear of "Glass Joe" spread amongst the children. One night, the children snuck out and drowned in the ocean because they imagined "Glass Joe" telling them the boat was on fire. Daniel, speaking in third-person, strongly suggests he hallucinated "Joe", dissociating into a psychotic state that led him to burn the boat with everyone but Emile inside, which eventually drove him to also murder the survivors, then Emile. Charley demands Lia's location. He demands her to turn off the recorder so she only knows where Lia is. It's heavily implied when she gets the answer, she kills Daniel off the record. She reveals to the interrogator that she knows he is Emile Haddock.
5	"Limetown (Finale)"	December 17, 2018
Emile takes Charley to Limetown. He says Oscar was obsessed with The Republic and the idea of a society where everyone has a job and does it. Pressing a weakness, he has Charley talk about her twin sister Cleo, who worked in Limetown. They were each other's only friends even in their teen years. When their father committed suicide, Cleo found his body. While far away, Charley shared the empathic sense of finding their father dead. Cleo came to Charley after she was saved from the panic in Limetown, but Charley noticed their connection of empathy was severed. Charley is oppositional to talking more about Cleo, especially since she thinks the tech was destroyed, but Emile reveals the technology was finalized and is ready for distribution. Charley continues speaking: Cleo was traumatized, and tried to cut her implant out. After her hospitalization, the two relaxed at the beach for the day. After the sun set, Cleo started putting rocks in her pockets, preparing to drown herself. Charley tried to stop her, but realized she couldn't be saved and tearfully gave her more rocks. Charley starts crying, and Emile pries at Lia's location. Charley reveals Cleo never existed. She lied and let Emile hold her captive to waste his time. Charley taunts him with two possibilities on what happened to Lia: Charley found Lia in Australia, interrogated her brutally, then sold her as well as her mother; or she killed Lia. Charley tells Emile it's over and he can't find the answer, and leaves him to grieve and cry. Lia is alive and held hostage, being asked "everything" she remembers about her dreams, if they're "percipient". She says she dreamed the Company thought they won, that Limetown was forgotten again. She says she has faith the story will always be remembered.

== Other media ==
=== Prequel book ===
Two-Up Productions signed a book deal with Simon & Schuster to produce a prequel of Limetown in novel form. It was written by Cote Smith and released on November 13, 2018.

=== TV series ===
On October 8, 2018, it was announced that Jessica Biel would star as Lia Haddock for a Limetown TV series, to air on Facebook Watch. Stanley Tucci was cast as Emile Haddock. The first season run of 10 episodes premiered October 16, 2019. The series was cancelled by Facebook Watch after its inaugural season. It was later made available on the NBCUniversal streaming service Peacock.

== See also ==
- List of podcast adaptations
