= Limetown (TV series) =

American drama web television series

- Genre: Drama
- Created by: Zack Akers; Skip Bronkie
- Based on: Limetown by: Zack Akers; Skip Bronkie
- Directed by: Rebecca Thomas
- Starring: Jessica Biel; Stanley Tucci
- Country of origin: United States
- Original language: English
- No. of seasons: 1
- No. of episodes: 10

Production
- Executive producers: Jessica Biel; Michelle Purple; Zack Akers; Skip Bronkie; Josh Appelbaum; André Nemec; Jeff Pinkner; Scott Rosenberg; Adrienne Erickson
- Running time: 30 minutes
- Production companies: Iron Ocean Productions; Endeavor Content; Midnight Radio

Original release
- Network: Facebook Watch
- Release: October 16 – November 13, 2019

Limetown is an American drama series, based on the podcast of the same name created by Zack Akers and Skip Bronkie, that premiered on Facebook Watch on October 16, 2019. The series stars Jessica Biel and Stanley Tucci.

On January 16, 2020, Facebook Watch canceled the series after one season.

== Premise ==
Limetown follows Lia Haddock, a journalist for American Public Radio (APR), as she unravels the mystery behind the disappearance of over 300 people at a neuroscience research facility in Tennessee.

== Cast and characters ==
=== Main ===
- Jessica Biel as Lia Haddock
- Stanley Tucci as Emile Haddock/"The man we were all there for"

=== Supporting and guest ===
- Sherri Saum as Gina Purri
- Alexander Black as Mark Green
- Alessandro Juliani as Dr. Oskar Totem
- Louis Ferreira as Dr. Max Finlayson
- Vera Frederickson as Young Lia
- Janet Kidder as Lenore Dougal
- Kandyse McClure as Lia's girlfriend
- Rekha Sharma as Special Agent Siddiqui
- Kelly Jenrette as Winona / Cyndi Walter
- Kelly Metzger as Meryl
- Marlee Matlin as Deirdre Wells
- Mingzhu Ye as Sylvia
- Èanna O'Dowd as Spencer
- Daniel Bacon as Karl Walter
- Sheryl Lee as Alison Haddock
- David Bloom as Harvey
- Tony Bailey as Daniel
- Harnoor Gill as Frankie
- Hiro Kanagawa as Reynaud Bram Villard
- John Beasley as Reverend Warren Chambers
- Chris Shields as Ron Calhoun
- Jason Tremblay as Young Jacob Haddock
- Ben Cotton as Terry Hilkins

== Episodes ==
No.	Title	Directed by	Written by	Original release date
1	"I Have Heard The Future"	Rebecca Thomas	Zack Akers & Skip Bronkie	October 16, 2019
Journalists Lia Haddock reckons with a 15-year-old mystery. What happened to the people of Limetown?
2	"Redacted"	Rebecca Thomas	Angel Varak-Iglar	October 16, 2019
Lia embarks on the first interview in record history with a Limetown survivor.
3	"Rake"	Rebecca Thomas	Kelly Wiles	October 23, 2019
Lia and Mark seek out a new Limetown survivor in Wyoming, but they're unprepared for what they find.
4	"Napoleon"	Rebecca Thomas	Zack Akers	October 23, 2019
Limetown`s second known survivor reveals the community's animal testing secret.
5	"Signals"	Rebecca Thomas	Emmy Grinwis	October 30, 2019
Lia finds herself in a bunker to interview the mysterious tycoon behind Limetown.
6	"A Simple Life"	Rebecca Thomas	Bryan Oh	October 30, 2019
Famed neuroscientist Max Finlayson divulges the purpose of the doomed research facility.
7	"Acceptable Loss"	Rebecca Thomas	Kelly Wiles & Angel Varak-Iglar	November 6, 2019
After an unexpected visit, Lia questions whether or not she should continue the investigation.
8	"Scarecrow"	Rebecca Thomas	Chris Littler & Dan Moyer	November 6, 2019
Limetown survivor Deirdre Wells reveals what incited The Panic.
9	"Apples and Oranges"	Rebecca Thomas	Emmy Grinwis & Bryan Oh	November 13, 2019
An unknown survivor sends Lia a disturbing video file with a promise that she has all the answers.
10	"Answers"	Rebecca Thomas	Zack Akers	November 13, 2019
Lia receives the answers she's been seeking.

== Production ==
=== Development ===
On October 8, 2018, it was announced that Facebook had given a series order to a television series adaptation of Zack Akers and Skip Bronkie's podcast Limetown, for a first season comprising 10 episodes. Akers and Bronkie were expected to write the series and serve as executive producers alongside Jessica Biel, Michelle Purple, Josh Appelbaum, André Nemec, Jeff Pinkner, Scott Rosenberg, and Adrienne Erickson. Production companies involved with the series were slated to include Iron Ocean Productions, Endeavor Content, and Midnight Radio.

=== Casting ===
Alongside the series order announcement, it was confirmed that Jessica Biel would star in the series. On December 6, 2018, it was announced that Stanley Tucci had been cast in a series regular role and that Marlee Matlin, Kelly Jenrette, John Beasley, and Louis Ferreira would appear in a recurring capacity. On January 12, 2019, it was announced that Sherri Saum had joined the series in a recurring role. On February 26, 2019, it was reported that Rekha Sharma has joined the cast in a recurring capacity.

=== Filming ===
Principal photography for the series was scheduled to last from December 5, 2018 to March 16, 2019 in Vancouver, British Columbia, Canada.

=== Release ===
In advance of its broadcast premiere, several episodes of the series received a preview screening in the Primetime program of the 2019 Toronto International Film Festival.

== Reception ==
On Rotten Tomatoes the series has an approval rating of 71% based on reviews from 13 critics. The site's critical consensus is: "Guided by an excellent turn from Jessica Biel, Limetown sustains an impressively creeping atmosphere that makes up for its occasionally fuzzy plotting." On Metacritic it has a score of 62 out of 100 based on reviews from 8 critics, indicating "generally favorable reviews".

== See also ==
- List of podcast adaptations
