= Inside Psycho =

Horror and film history podcast

Cast and voices
- Hosted by: Mark Ramsey

Publication
- Original release: Invalid date range

Related
- Followed by: Inside the Exorcist

Inside Psycho is a horror and film history podcast about Psycho hosted by Mark Ramsey and produced by Wondery.

== Background ==
The podcast consists of six episodes. The podcast discusses the person who was used as the inspiration for the character Norman Bates, Ed Gein. The podcast blends both factual documentary and fictional narrative elements. iHeartMedia broadcast an hour long edition of the podcast as a Halloween special. This was the first podcast to be nationally broadcast via radio in the U.S.

== Reception ==
The podcast reached number eight on the iTunes podcast charts. Michael Woodward wrote in Podcast Magazine that the podcast is a "well-researched, crafted, and a revealing look into the facts and fiction". Mitchell Wells wrote in Horror Society that the podcast "weaves an entertaining tale". Rebecca McCallum wrote in Ghouls Magazine that the podcast has "high-quality production values and fascinating content".

== See also ==
- List of horror podcasts
- List of film and television podcasts
