= Dr. Death (2021 TV series) =

American crime drama television series

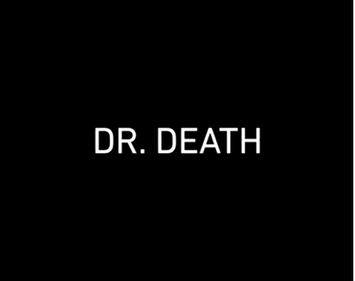
- Genre: Anthology; True crime
- Created by: Patrick Macmanus (season 1); Ashley Michel Hoban (season 2)
- Based on: Dr. Death by Wondery
- Starring: Joshua Jackson; Grace Gummer; Christian Slater; Alec Baldwin; AnnaSophia Robb; Édgar Ramírez; Mandy Moore; Ashley Madekwe; Gustaf Hammarsten; Luke Kirby
- Music by: Atticus Ross; Leopold Ross; Nick Chuba
- Country of origin: United States
- Original language: English
- No. of seasons: 2
- No. of episodes: 16

Production
- Executive producers: Patrick Macmanus; Todd Black; Jason Blumenthal; Taylor Latham; Steve Tisch; Aaron Hart; Marshall Lewy; Hernan Lopez; Christian Slater; Alec Baldwin; Matt Del Piano; Maggie Kiley; Evan Wright; Ashley Michel Hoban (season 2); Jennifer Morrison; Linda Gase
- Producers: Ashley Michel Hoban (season 1); Russ Hammonds
- Cinematography: Kat Westergaard; Zachary Galler; Vanja Černjul; DJ Stipsen
- Editors: Ryan Denmark; David Leonard; David Carlos Valdez; Joe Giganti; Anthony Muzzatti
- Running time: 44–63 minutes
- Production companies: Littleton Road Productions; Escape Artists; Wondery; Universal Content Productions

Original release
- Network: Peacock
- Release: July 15, 2021 – December 21, 2023

Dr. Death is an American true crime drama anthology television series created by Patrick Macmanus, based on the podcast of the same name. It premiered on Peacock on July 15, 2021. In July 2022, the series was renewed for a second season that premiered on December 21, 2023.

== Premise ==
Season 1 dramatizes the story of Christopher Duntsch, an American neurosurgeon convicted after permanently mutilating his patients, killing two of them.

Season 2 dramatizes the story of Italian surgeon and medical researcher Paolo Macchiarini, who was convicted after experimenting on his patients.

== Cast ==
=== Season 1 ===
==== Main ====
- Joshua Jackson as Christopher Duntsch
- Grace Gummer as Kim Morgan
- Christian Slater as Randall Kirby
- Alec Baldwin as Robert Henderson
- AnnaSophia Robb as Michelle Shughart

==== Recurring ====
- Fred Lehne as Don Duntsch
- Hubert Point-Du Jour as Josh Baker
- Maryann Plunkett as Madeline Beyer
- Grainger Hines as Earl Burke
- Kelsey Grammer as Dr. Geoffrey Skadden
- Dominic Burgess as Jerry Summers
- Molly Griggs as Wendy Young
- Laila Robins as Amy Piel
- Dashiell Eaves as Stan Novak
- Jennifer Kim as Stephanie Wu
- Kelly Kirklyn as Dorothy Burke
- Marceline Hugot as Rose Keller

==== Guest stars ====
- Carrie Preston as Robbie McClung

=== Season 2 ===
==== Main ====
- Édgar Ramírez as Paolo Macchiarini
- Mandy Moore as Benita Alexander
- Ashley Madekwe as Dr. Ana Lasbrey
- Gustaf Hammarsten as Dr. Anders Svensson
- Luke Kirby as Dr. Nathan Gamelli

==== Recurring ====
- Alisha Erözer as Yeşim Çetir
- Judy Reyes as Kim Verdi
- Annika Boras as Marja
- Rita Volk as Yulia Tuulik
- Greg Hildreth as Luke
- Celestina Harris as Lizzi
- Jack Davenport as Nils Headley
- Femi Olagoke as Andemariam Beyene

== Episodes ==
=== Series overview ===
Season	Episodes	Originally released
1	8	July 15, 2021
2	8	December 21, 2023

=== Season 1 (2021) ===
No. overall	No. in season	Title	Directed by	Written by	Original release date
1	1	"Diplos"	Maggie Kiley	Patrick Macmanus	July 15, 2021
2	2	"Ain't No Bum"	Maggie Kiley	Ashley Michel Hoban	July 15, 2021
3	3	"Dock Ellis"	Jennifer Morrison	Evan Wright	July 15, 2021
4	4	"An Occurrence at Randall Kirby's Sink"	Jennifer Morrison	Ahmadu Garba	July 15, 2021
5	5	"The $?!& in the Bed"	So Yong Kim	Matthew White	July 15, 2021
6	6	"Occam's Razor"	So Yong Kim	Sara Pearson & Maxwell Michael Towson	July 15, 2021
7	7	"Feet of Clay"	So Yong Kim	Ashley Michel Hoban & Ahmadu Garba	July 15, 2021
8	8	"Hardwood Floors"	So Yong Kim	Patrick Macmanus	July 15, 2021

=== Season 2 (2023) ===
No. overall	No. in season	Title	Directed by	Written by	Original release date
9	1	"Like Magic"	Jennifer Morrison	Ashley Michel Hoban	December 21, 2023
10	2	"Worth the Risk"	Jennifer Morrison	Linda Gase	December 21, 2023
11	3	"The Horizon"	Jennifer Morrison	Nilanjana Bose & Jakub Ciupinski	December 21, 2023
12	4	"Tarantela Telaraña"	Jennifer Morrison	Gregory Locklear	December 21, 2023
13	5	"191"	Laura Belsey	Bashir Gavriel	December 21, 2023
14	6	"The Fog"	Laura Belsey	Sara Pearson	December 21, 2023
15	7	"Compassionate Uses"	Laura Belsey	Matthew White	December 21, 2023
16	8	"Surgeons, Bachelors and Butchers"	Laura Belsey	Ashley Michel Hoban & Luca Rojas	December 21, 2023

== Production ==
=== Development ===
On October 3, 2018, NBCUniversal announced that Patrick Macmanus would adapt the Dr. Death podcast into a series and produce with Todd Black, Jason Blumenthal and Steve Tisch executive produce via Escape Artists, as well as Hernan Lopez and Marshall Lewy. On September 17, 2019, NBCUniversal announced that the series would be distributed on its streaming service Peacock. In January 2020, it was announced Stephen Frears would direct the first two episodes. In September 2020, Frears was replaced by Maggie Kiley. On July 14, 2022, Peacock renewed the series for a second season with Ashley Michel Hoban promoted from a producer to an executive producer and new showrunner. The second season will focus on Paolo Macchiarini. On October 18, 2022, it was announced that Jennifer Morrison is set to direct episodes 1–4 and Laura Belsey is set to direct episodes 5–8 of the second season.

=== Casting ===
On August 9, 2019, Jamie Dornan, Alec Baldwin, and Christian Slater were cast as Dr. Christopher Duntsch, Robert Henderson, and Randall Kirby, respectively. In March 2020, Grace Gummer, Molly Griggs, AnnaSophia Robb and Chris Sullivan joined the cast of the series. On October 12, 2020, Joshua Jackson and Dominic Burgess joined the cast of the series, replacing Dornan and Sullivan respectively. Later in the same month, Hubert Point-Du Jour and Maryann Plunkett were cast in undisclosed capacities and character name roles. On February 12, 2021, Carrie Preston joined the cast. In November 2022, Édgar Ramírez was cast as Paolo Macchiarini and Mandy Moore was cast as Benita Alexander for the second season. On January 23, 2023, Rita Volk, Judy Reyes, Jack Davenport, Annika Boras, and Sandra Andreis joined the cast in recurring capacities for the second season.

== Release ==
On May 17, 2021, alongside the release of an official trailer, it was announced that the series was scheduled to premiere in the summer of 2021. The first season premiered on July 15, 2021, with an eight-episode release. The second season premiered on December 21, 2023, with an eight-episode release.

In Canada, the show debuted on Showcase on September 12, 2021.

The series had its linear premiere on the USA Network on October 5, 2022.

== Reception ==
The review aggregator website Rotten Tomatoes reported a 93% approval rating for the series' first season with an average score of 7.5/10 based on 29 critic reviews. The website's critics consensus reads, "Though it keeps viewers in the waiting room a little too long, Dr. Death remains a horrifying tale of medical malpractice centered around Joshua Jackson's sufficiently unsettling performance." Metacritic, which uses a weighted average, assigned the first season a score of 75 out of 100 based on 12 critics, indicating "generally favorable reviews".

Kristen Baldwin of Entertainment Weekly gave the series' first season an A− and wrote a review saying, "The what and the how are harrowing enough. Dr. Death succeeds by focusing on the people who fought for years to make sure Christopher Duntsch could do no more harm."

The second season has an 80% approval rating on Rotten Tomatoes, based on 10 critic reviews, with an average rating of 7/10. The website's critics consensus states, "Entangling Édgar Ramírez and Mandy Moore in a bad romance with skin-crawling results, Dr. Death's second season cuts with a mean scalpel." Metacritic, which uses a weighted average, assigned the second season a score of 67 out of 100 based on 6 critics, indicating "generally favorable reviews".
