= Imagined Life =

Podcast from Wondery

- Podcast art for Imagined Life
- Genre: Biography
- Format: Second-person narrative
- Language: English

Cast and voices
- Hosted by: Virginia Madsen, Robbie Daymond

Production
- Length: 40–50 Minutes

Publication
- No. of seasons: 3
- No. of episodes: 48
- Original release: November 4, 2018 – present
- Provider: Wondery

Related
- Website: Imagined Life – Wondery

Imagined Life is a podcast produced by Wondery and hosted by Virginia Madsen and Robbie Daymond. The podcast presents biographies of famous people in an unusual format. The first episode premiered on November 4, 2018, and 48 episodes have been produced by the end of the third season. Imagined Life won the 2018 podcast award by online publication Quartz in the categories "Best podcast on the human condition" and "Best new podcast". The podcast will be developed into a TV documentary series by Universal Content Productions.

== Format ==
Each episode tells the life-story of one famous person. The subjects often include entertainers, political leaders, businessmen or sportsmen. An episode begins with a dramatic unresolved moment in the person's life, before going through the biography of the person in chronological order. The life events are presented in a dramatized way with reenactments of conversations.

The defining feature of "Imagined Life" is its second-person narration. Listeners are invited to imagine themselves being the famous person, although the person's identity is not revealed until the end. Identifying characteristics, such as gender, profession or country of origin, are intentionally omitted in the beginning and only gradually revealed among with other "clues" as the episode progresses. The creators describe this format as "second person biographical guessing game". Each episode ends with a reveal of the subject and recommended further reading.

The podcast also produces shorter episodes labeled as "Imagined Life Family" that cater to younger listeners, or for families to listen to together.

== Episodes ==
#	Title	Date	Subject	Recommended reading
1	The Outsider	November 4, 2018	Elon Musk	Elon Musk: Tesla, SpaceX, and the Quest for a Fantastic Future
2	The Daydreamer	November 4, 2018	J.K. Rowling	None
3	The Performer	November 11, 2018	Elton John	None
4	The Bride	November 18, 2018	Princess Diana	None
5	The Warrior	November 25, 2018	Muhammad Ali	Ali: A Life; The Greatest - My Own Story
6	The Trailbrazer	December 2, 2018	Lucille Ball	None
7	The Advocate	December 9, 2018	Ellen DeGeneres	Podcast "Ellen on the go"
8	The Chameleon	December 16, 2018	Jane Fonda	My Life So Far; Jane Fonda: The Private Life of a Public Woman; Jane Fonda in Five Acts; Jane Fonda's Original Workout Series
9	The Perfectionist	December 23, 2018	Dr. Seuss	None
10	The Officer	January 13, 2019	Vladimir Putin	The New Tsar: The Rise and Reign of Vladimir Putin; The Man Without a Face: The Unlikely Rise of Vladimir Putin
11	The Commoner	January 27, 2019	George Orwell	None
12	The Winner	February 3, 2019	Sarah Palin	None
13	The Everyman	February 17, 2019	Jackie Chan	Never Grow Up; I Am Jackie Chan: My Life in Action
14	The Achiever	February 24, 2019	Sonia Sotomayor	None
15	The Student	March 10, 2019	Martin Scorsese	None
16	The Grown-Up	March 17, 2019	Drew Barrymore	Wlidflower; Drew Barrymore: The Biography
17	The Misfit	March 31, 2019	Whoopi Goldberg	None
18	The Entertainer	February 24, 2019	Sammy Davis Jr.	None
19	The Traveller	April 14, 2019	Maya Angelou	None
20	The Firecracker	April 21, 2019	Reba McEntire	Reba: My Story; Comfort from a Country Quilt
21	The Lover	September 6, 2019	Frank Lloyd Wright	Death in a Prairie House: Frank Lloyd Wright and the Taliesin Murders
22	The Ballerina	September 13, 2019	Audrey Hepburn	None
23	The Captive	September 20, 2019	Howard Hughes	None
24	The Passenger	September 27, 2019	Aretha Franklin	None
25	The Troublemaker	October 4, 2019	Michael Moore	Here Comes Trouble: Stories from My Life
26	The Reject	October 11, 2019	Stephen King	None
27	The Model	October 18, 2019	George Takei	None
28	The Eccentric	October 25, 2019	Harper Lee	Mockingbird: A Portrait of Harper Lee
29	The Loudmouth	November 1, 2019	Margaret Cho	I'm the One That I Want
30	The Patron	November 8, 2019	Pablo Escobar	None
31	The Searcher	November 15, 2019	Joni Mitchell	None
32	The Wannabe	November 22, 2019	Stan Lee	
33	The Handler	November 29, 2019	Jim Henson	Jim Henson: The Biography; Imagination Illustrated: The Jim Henson Journal
34	The Hothead	December 6, 2019	Dwayne "The Rock" Johnson	The Rock Says...; Dwayne 'The Rock' Johnson: The Life, Lessons & Rules for Success
35	The Pioneer	December 13, 2019	Betty Ford	None
36	The Widow	December 20, 2019	Joan Rivers	None
37	The Workhorse	April 3, 2020	John Wayne	None
38	The Survivor	April 10, 2020	Dr. Ruth	All In a Lifetime; Ask Dr. Ruth
39	The Idealist	April 17, 2020	Edward Snowden	Permanent Record
40	The Exile	April 24, 2020	Nina Simone	Princess Noire: The Tumultuous Reign of Nina Simone
41	The Wanderer	May 1, 2020	Langston Hughes	The Big Sea
42	The Fugitive	May 8, 2020	Marilyn Monroe	Marilyn in Manhattan: Her Year of Joy
43	The Caretaker	May 22, 2020	Katharine Graham	"Personal History" by Katharine Graham
44	The Dreamer	May 29, 2020	Walt Disney	None
45	The Orphan	June 5, 2020	RuPaul	None
46	The Secret Agent	June 12, 2020	Roald Dahl	Roald Dahl: A Biography
47	The Striver	June 19, 2020	Martha Stewart	None
48	The Soloist	June 26, 2020	George Michael	"Wham! George & Me"; George: A Memory of George Michael
