= Paolo Macchiarini =

Italian physician (born 1958)

- Born: Paolo Macchiarini; 22 August 1958 (age 68); Basel, Switzerland
- Education: University of Pisa
- Occupation: Surgeon
- Known for: Scientific misconduct, plastic tracheas
- Children: 3

Paolo Macchiarini (Note: Italian pronunciation: [ˈpaolo makˈkjarini].) (born 22 August 1958) is a convicted felon, thoracic surgeon and former regenerative medicine researcher who became known for research fraud and manipulative behavior. He was convicted of research-related crimes in Italy and Sweden.

Previously considered a pioneer for using both biological and synthetic scaffolds seeded with patients' own stem cells as trachea transplants, Macchiarini was a visiting professor and director on a temporary contract at Sweden's Karolinska Institutet (KI) from 2010. Macchiarini was convicted of unethically performing experimental surgeries, even on relatively healthy patients, resulting in fatalities for seven of the eight patients who received one of his synthetic trachea transplants.

Articles in Vanity Fair and Aftonbladet further suggested he had falsified some academic credentials on résumés.

Urban Lendahl, the secretary of the Nobel Committee for Physiology or Medicine, resigned in February 2016, owing to his involvement in recruiting Macchiarini to KI. Shortly afterwards KI's vice chancellor, Anders Hamsten, who in 2015 had cleared Macchiarini of misconduct, resigned. KI terminated its clinical relationship with Macchiarini in 2013 but allowed him to continue as a researcher; in February 2016, the university announced it would not renew his research contract, which was due to expire in November, and terminated the contract the following month. After being dismissed from KI, Macchiarini worked at the Kazan Federal University in Russia until that institution terminated his project in April 2017, effectively firing him.

After a one-year medico-legal investigation, the Swedish Prosecution Authority announced in October 2017 that Macchiarini had been negligent in four of the five cases investigated, due to the use of devices and procedures not supported by evidence, but a crime could not be proven because the patients might have died under any other treatment given. Macchiarini was convicted of causing bodily harm, but not assault. He received a suspended sentence in June 2022. However, a year later his sentence was increased to two years and six months imprisonment by an appeals court. An appeal to the Supreme Court was rejected in October 2023, and Macchiarini began serving his sentence in Spain in September 2024.

Sweden's Expert Group on Scientific Misconduct found evidence of research fraud by Macchiarini and his co-authors in six papers and called for them to be retracted. As of 2023, 11 of his research papers have been retracted, four others have received an expression of concern, and three others have been corrected.

== Education and career ==
Macchiarini obtained his medical degree (equivalent to MD) at the Medical School of the University of Pisa (UniPi) in 1986 and a Master of Surgery in 1991. He was an assistant professor at UniPi from 1990 to 1992. He claimed he was a fellow for approximately two years in the Department of Thoracic Surgery at University of Alabama at Birmingham in 1989. This was later refuted by the university as they did not have a department of thoracic surgery, though they do have a department of cardiothoracic surgery. He was, however, a fellow for 6 months in their Hematology/Oncology department. Macchiarini obtained degree certificates—a masters in organ and tissue transplantation dated 1994 and a doctorate in the same dated 1997—from University of Franche-Comté in France. According to Germany's Hannover Medical School, he never had a salaried position there, but was head of the department of thoracic and vascular surgery at the Heidehaus Hanover hospital between 1999 and 2004. Macchiarini was an investigator at the Institut d'Investigacions Biomèdiques in Barcelona, Spain, from 2006 to 2009; he was affiliated with but not an employee of the University of Barcelona and was apparently an employee at the Hospital Clínic de Barcelona during this time. He had an honorary appointment as a visiting professor from 2009 to 2014, at University College London. He was a consultant and project manager at University Hospital Careggi (AOUC) starting in 2010.

Later in 2010, Macchiarini was appointed as a visiting professor at the Karolinska Institute (KI) in Stockholm and as a part-time position as surgeon at the affiliated university hospital. In 2013, his clinical relationship with KI was terminated, but Macchiarini was able to continue his research at the institute. In February 2016, the university announced that it would not renew Macchiarini's research contract, which was due to expire in November, and terminated the contract the following month. KI published the incomplete results of its verification of Macchiarini's CV in February 2016.

Macchiarini made ties in Russia after he gave a master class in 2010, at the invitation of politician Mikhail Batin; a few months later he did a trachea transplant there which was widely covered in Russian media. This led to Macchiarini's 2011 appointment at Kuban State Medical University along with an honorary doctorate. In 2016, he moved to Kazan Federal University and the grant money moved with him. In April 2017, the university terminated Macchiarini's research project there.

== Notable trachea surgeries ==
=== Claudia Castillo ===
In June 2008, Macchiarini conducted a transplant of a donated trachea colonized with the stem cells of the recipient, Claudia Castillo; the tissue was used to replace her left bronchus, which had been damaged by tuberculosis, and her left lung had collapsed. The trachea came from a cadaver, and was stripped of its cells and seeded with cells taken from Castillo's bone marrow. The bone marrow cells were cultured at the University of Bristol, the donor trachea was stripped at University of Padua, the stripped trachea was seeded with the cultured cells at Polytechnic University of Milan, and the trachea was transplanted by a team led by Macchiarini at Hospital Clinic in Barcelona. She underwent a lung amputation in July 2016.

=== Ciaran Finn-Lynch ===
In March 2010, similar to the one done for Castillo, this was on a ten-year-old Irish boy, Ciaran Finn-Lynch, at Great Ormond Street Hospital in London. The boy was born with a 1 mm diameter trachea, and efforts to widen it had caused life-threatening complications. Unlike the Castillo procedure, in this case, the stripped trachea was seeded with the boy's stem cells just hours before it was implanted.

=== Keziah Shorten ===
Keziah Shorten had tracheal cancer. In 2010, Macchiarini performed a transplant similar to the earlier two; the transplant failed almost a year later and a synthetic trachea was implanted for palliative care at University College Hospital London in 2011. She was discharged home late October 2011 and re-admitted early November 2011 for a change of tracheostomy tube. She then succumbed to hospital-acquired pneumonia which led to her death in January 2012.

=== Zhadyra Iglikova ===
In 2010, Macchiarini implanted a seeded donated trachea in a 25-year-old woman in Russia, Zhadyra Iglikova, while working with surgeon Vladimir Parshin. According to her parents as of mid-2016, she had been unable to speak or stand and only left their home to visit health facilities. She died in 2018 due to complications from chronic pneumonia, a tracheoesophageal fistula and severe malnutrition.

=== Andemariam Teklesenbet Beyene ===
Andemariam Teklesenbet Beyene was a man from Eritrea who was earning a master's degree in Iceland when he was diagnosed with cancer. The cancer was treated with chemotherapy and surgery in 2009, but in 2011 his trachea was obstructed again. Beyene's doctors recommended palliative care, but also reached out to Macchiarini, who was at KI by that time. In this case, Macchiarini collaborated with scientists at University College London to manufacture a fully synthetic trachea, with an engineered scaffold seeded with Beyene's marrow cells, instead of using a donated and stripped trachea, as it had been done before. The operation occurred in June 2011 and was widely covered in the media, including a front page story in The New York Times. By end of the year the implant was failing, and while Beyene was able to complete his Ph.D. in 2012, he died in January 2013 despite undergoing many treatments at KI. The autopsy showed that Beyene had a chronic lung infection, a clot in his lung, and the synthetic trachea had come loose.

=== Christopher Lyles ===
Christopher Lyles lived in the United States; he had tracheal cancer which was treated with radiation and surgery. He heard about Beyene's treatment and through his doctor asked Macchiarini to do the same for him. Macchiarini obliged, creating a fully synthetic trachea seeded with stem cells from Lyles and implanting it at KI in November 2011. Lyles died suddenly in 2012 after he had returned home; no autopsy was performed.

=== Yulia Tuulik ===
In June 2012, Macchiarini implanted a fully synthetic seeded trachea in Yulia Tuulik at Kuban State Medical University. Tuulik had a tracheostomy resulting from a car accident, but her life was not in danger. The graft included a cricoid cartilage, part of the voice box, which Macchiarini had not tried before. The trachea later collapsed, and was replaced; she died in 2014. An audit by the Russian government later found that Macchiarini had operated without a Russian medical license.

=== Alexander Zozulya ===
Also in June 2012, Macchiarini implanted a second synthetic seeded trachea on Alexander Zozulya, who also had a tracheostomy resulting from a car accident and whose life was not in danger. The effects from the first implant in 2012 prompted a second surgery in November 2013. Zozulya died in February 2014 under unclear circumstances.

=== Yesim Cetir ===
Turkish national Yesim Cetir underwent a routine surgery in 2011 to treat excessive sweating in her hands, but due to an error her trachea was severely injured and her left lung was damaged. She came to Macchiarini at the KI for treatment, and in 2012 he first removed her left lung and replaced her trachea with a pipe, then replaced the pipe with a fully synthetic seeded trachea. The next year the implant collapsed and Macchiarini replaced it with a second one. Cetir had many complications from this procedure, remained in constant need of having her airway cleared, and suffered kidney failure. In 2016 she underwent multiple organ transplants in the U.S., and her trachea was replaced with one from a cadaver. Cetir died in March 2017.

=== Hannah Warren ===
In April 2013, Macchiarini implanted a fully synthetic seeded trachea in two-year-old Hannah Warren, who had been born without one. The operation was performed at OSF Saint Francis Medical Center in Peoria, Illinois, United States. The operation also involved her esophagus, which did not heal properly and required a second operation in June; she died 6 July 2013, from complications of the second surgery.

=== Sadiq Kanaan ===
In August 2013 Sadiq Kanaan received a fully synthetic seeded tracheal implant from Macchiarini at Kuban State Medical University. He died later the same year.

=== Dmitri Onogda ===
In June 2014, Macchiarini implanted a fully synthetic seeded trachea in Dmitri Onogda at the Kuban State Medical University. The implant failed and was removed, and as of 2017 Onogda was still alive with a tracheostomy, having retained part of his natural trachea.

== Allegations ==
=== University Hospital Careggi patient extortion ===
In 2012, Macchiarini was arrested in Italy and charged with asking patients at AOUC for money to expedite their procedures; the charges were dismissed in May 2015 and the prosecutor's appeal was dismissed in September 2015.

=== Research misconduct ===
In 2014, Macchiarini was accused by four former colleagues and co-authors of having falsified claims in his research with KI. The following April, KI's ethics committee issued a response to one set of allegations with regard to research ethics and peer review at The Lancet, and found them to be groundless.

KI had also appointed an external expert, Bengt Gerdin, to review the charges, comparing the results reported to the medical record of the hospital; the report was released by the university in May 2015. Gerdin found that Macchiarini had committed scientific misconduct in seven papers by not getting ethical approval for some of his operations, and misrepresenting the result of some of those operations, as well as work he had done on animals.

In August 2015, after considering the findings and a rebuttal provided by Macchiarini, KI vice-chancellor Anders Hamsten found that he had acted "without due care" but had not committed misconduct. The Lancet, which published Macchiarini's work, also published an article defending him.

On 13 January 2016, Gerdin criticized the vice-chancellor's dismissal of the allegations in an interview with Sveriges Television (SVT). Later that day, the SVT investigative program Dokument inifrån began broadcasting a three-part series, titled "Experimenten", in which Macchiarini's work was investigated. The documentary shows Macchiarini continuing operations with his new transplant method even after it showed little or no promise, exaggerating the health of his patients in articles as they died. While Macchiarini admitted that the synthetic trachea did not work in the current state, he did not agree that trying it on several additional patients without further testing had been inappropriate. Allegations were also made that patients' medical conditions both before and after the operations, as reported in academic papers, did not match reality. Macchiarini also stated that the synthetic trachea had been tested on animals before using it on humans, something that could not be verified.

On 28 January, KI issued a statement saying that the documentary made claims of which it was unaware, and that it would consider re-opening the investigations. These concerns were echoed by KI's chairman, Lars Leijonborg, and the chairman of the Swedish Medical Association, Heidi Stensmyren, calling for an independent investigation that would also look at how the issue was dealt with by the university and hospital management.

In February 2016, KI published a review of Macchiarini's CV that identified discrepancies. The university announced that it would not renew Macchiarini's research contract, which was due to expire in November, and the next month Karolinska terminated the contract.

In October 2016, the BBC broadcast a three-part Storyville documentary, Fatal Experiments: The Downfall of a Supersurgeon, directed by Bosse Lindquist and based on the earlier Swedish programmes about Macchiarini. After the special aired, KI requested Sweden's national scientific review board to review six of Macchiarini's publications about the procedures. The board published its findings in October 2017, and concluded that all six were the result of scientific misconduct, in particular by failing to report the complications and deaths that occurred after the interventions; one of the articles also claimed that the procedure had been approved by an ethics committee, when this had not happened. The board called for all six of the papers to be retracted. It also said that all of the co-authors had committed scientific misconduct as well.

=== Retractions ===
The following papers authored by Macchiarini have been retracted:

- November 2012, retracted for scientific misconduct by the journal for copying a table from another paper without citing it:
  - Gonfiotti, Alessandro; Jaus, Massimo Osvaldo; Barale, Daniel; Baiguera, Silvia; Polizzi, Leonardo; Jungebluth, Philipp; Paoletti, Matteo; Pistolesi, Massimo; Macchiarini, Paolo (2012). "Retracted: Development and Validation of a New Outcome Score in Subglottic Stenosis". The Annals of Thoracic Surgery. 94 (4): 1065–1072. doi:10.1016/j.athoracsur.2012.05.107. PMID 22858276. (Retracted, see doi:10.1016/j.athoracsur.2012.10.030, PMID 23316495, Retraction Watch)
- March 2017, retracted by authors after Karolinska requested retraction in December 2016; after Nature had issued an editorial notice of concern in October 2016:
  - Sjöqvist, Sebastian; Jungebluth, Philipp; Ling Lim, Mei; Haag, Johannes C.; Gustafsson, Ylva; Lemon, Greg; Baiguera, Silvia; Angel Burguillos, Miguel; Del Gaudio, Costantino; Rodríguez, Antonio Beltrán; Sotnichenko, Alexander; Kublickiene, Karolina; Ullman, Henrik; Kielstein, Heike; Damberg, Peter; Bianco, Alessandra; Heuchel, Rainer; Zhao, Ying; Ribatti, Domenico; Ibarra, Cristián; Joseph, Bertrand; Taylor, Doris A.; Macchiarini, Paolo (2014). "Experimental orthotopic transplantation of a tissue-engineered oesophagus in rats". Nature Communications. 5 3562. Bibcode:2014NatCo...5.3562S. doi:10.1038/ncomms4562. PMC 4354271. PMID 24736316. (Retracted, see doi:10.1038/ncomms15077, PMID 28323815, Retraction Watch)
- Macchiarini's 2011 Lancet paper described the treatment of Beyene. In February 2016 the Royal Swedish Academy of Sciences called for the Lancet to correct the paper, as Beyene had died, in March 2016 four authors asked to be removed as authors, and in April 2016 the Lancet issued a notice of concern; this paper too has since been retracted.
  - Jungebluth, Philipp; Alici, Evren; Baiguera, Silvia; Blomberg, Pontus; Bozóky, Béla; Crowley, Claire; Einarsson, Oskar; Gudbjartsson, Tomas; Le Guyader, Sylvie; Henriksson, Gert; Hermanson, Ola; Juto, Jan Erik; Leidner, Bertil; Lilja, Tobias; Liska, Jan; Luedde, Tom; Lundin, Vanessa; Moll, Guido; Roderburg, Christoph; Strömblad, Staffan; Sutlu, Tolga; Watz, Emma; Seifalian, Alexander; Macchiarini, Paolo (2011). "Retracted: Tracheobronchial transplantation with a stem-cell-seeded bioartificial nanocomposite: A proof-of-concept study". The Lancet. 378 (9808): 1997–2004. doi:10.1016/S0140-6736(11)61715-7. PMID 22119609. S2CID 4578451. (Retracted, see doi:10.1016/S0140-6736(18)31558-7, PMID 30047380, Retraction Watch)
- October 2023, 2008 Lancet paper, retracted by the journal for falsification, including the claim that 'the graft immediately provided the recipient with a functional airway, improved her quality of life, and had a normal appearance and mechanical properties at 4 months':
  - Macchiarini, Paolo; Jungebluth, Philipp; Go, Tetsuhiko; Asnaghi, M Adelaide; Rees, Louisa E; Cogan, Tristan A; Dodson, Amanda; Martorell, Jaume; Bellini, Silvia; Parnigotto, Pier Paolo; Dickinson, Sally C; Hollander, Anthony P; Mantero, Sara; Conconi, Maria Teresa; Birchall, Martin A (December 2008). "Retracted: Clinical transplantation of a tissue-engineered airway". The Lancet. 372 (9655): 2023–2030. doi:10.1016/s0140-6736(08)61598-6. ISSN 0140-6736. PMID 19022496. S2CID 13153058. (Retracted, see doi:10.1016/S0140-6736(23)02341-3, PMID 37898523, Retraction Watch)
- October 2023, 2013 Lancet paper, retracted by the journal for containing fabrication and falsification in several places, and three falsified figures:
  - Gonfiotti, Alessandro; Jaus, Massimo O; Barale, Daniel; Baiguera, Silvia; Comin, Camilla; Lavorini, Federico; Fontana, Giovanni; Sibila, Oriol; Rombolà, Giovanni; Jungebluth, Philipp; Macchiarini, Paolo (January 2014). "Retracted: The first tissue-engineered airway transplantation: 5-year follow-up results". The Lancet. 383 (9913): 238–244. doi:10.1016/s0140-6736(13)62033-4. ISSN 0140-6736. PMID 24161821. S2CID 41597285. (Retracted, see doi:10.1016/S0140-6736(23)02340-1, PMID 37898524, Retraction Watch)
- January 2024: a 2012 Biomaterials paper retracted for "falsification and/or fabrication".

=== Fallout for Karolinska Institute ===
The secretary of the Nobel Committee for Physiology or Medicine, Urban Lendahl, resigned in February 2016, owing to his involvement in recruiting Macchiarini to Karolinska Institutet in 2010. Shortly afterwards the vice chancellor of KI, Anders Hamsten, who in 2015 had cleared Macchiarini of scientific misconduct, also resigned.

In August 2016, a committee led by Kjell Asplund that had been called into being in February to investigate the three operations that Macchiarini had performed at the Karolinska University Hospital issued its report, identifying several ethical shortcomings by the hospital and Macchiarini; it also noted the pressure which the institute put on the hospital with regard to Macchiarini's hospital appointment and translational research.

Another report issued in early September examined the behavior of the institute; it was authored by a committee led by Sten Heckscher. The report found that the institute had conducted almost no diligence in hiring Macchiarini nor in overseeing his work, nor in considering his performance in reviewing his contracts; the committee found that people higher up in management had interfered in the processes.

On 5 September 2016, the Swedish government moved to dismiss the entire board of the Institute. Shortly afterwards Harriet Wallberg and Anders Hamsten were removed from the judging panel that is responsible for annually choosing the Nobel Prize for Medicine, selection of which is additionally overseen by Karolinska Institutet.

== Criminal investigations, convictions and imprisonment ==
In June 2016 Swedish police opened an investigation into whether Macchiarini might have committed involuntary manslaughter. After a one-year medico-legal investigation, the attorney general's office announced in October 2017 that Macchiarini had been negligent in four of the five cases investigated due to the use of devices and procedures not supported by evidence, but that a crime could not be proven because the patients might have died under any other treatment.

In 2019, an Italian court sentenced Macchiarini to sixteen months in prison for abuse of office and forging documents, but he was ultimately acquitted of all charges by the Supreme Court.

On 29 September 2020, Mikael Björk, director of Public Prosecution in Sweden indicted an unnamed surgeon on charges of aggravated assault. Swedish news agency TT said the indicted surgeon was Paolo Macchiarini. Björk said he reopened the investigation in December 2018, obtained new written evidence and interviewed individuals in five different countries. Björk said victims received "serious physical injuries and great suffering" as a result of the operations performed on them and that he "made the assessment that three operations were therefore to be considered as aggravated assault." Macchiarini was convicted of causing bodily harm, but not assault. He received a suspended sentence on 16 June 2022.

On 21 June 2023 however, his sentence was increased to two years and six months imprisonment after being found guilty of gross assault against three of his patients by an appeals court in Stockholm. His lawyers lodged an appeal to the Supreme Court, and were granted time to present new evidence. The Supreme Court declined to consider the appeal on 30 October 2023. Given that Macchiarini has been a resident of Spain for many years, Swedish authorities decided in March 2024 that he could serve his sentence in Spain, if Spanish authorities agreed. The Central Criminal Court in Madrid agreed to this in June 2024. He began serving his sentence in a prison near Barcelona in September 2024.

== Personal life ==
In 1986, Macchiarini married Italian woman Emanuela Pecchia; the couple have two children together, a girl and a boy. He also has a daughter by Ana Paula Bernardes, who met Macchiarini in 2010 when he operated on her son Danilo, who died shortly after the operation. That relationship ended in 2016, when Bernardes learned of Macchiarini's relationship with NBC News producer Benita Alexander.

Alexander had been tasked by NBC to produce a documentary for Dateline in 2013 called "A Leap of Faith" to portray Macchiarini. She began an affair with her subject, only to find out later in 2015 that he had been married for almost thirty years, including the entire period of their courtship. Alexander recounted Macchiarini's alleged lies about being a surgeon to the stars and current and former heads of state such as former USA Presidents Bill Clinton and Barack Obama, and former USA presidential candidate Hillary Clinton. A wedding to Alexander was planned to be the social event of the year with Pope Francis officiating, Andrea Bocelli and Elton John singing, Enoteca Pinchiorri catering, and numerous celebrities attending. Macchiarini is reported to have claimed that Pope Francis had given his personal blessing for the wedding between the couple, both said to be divorcees, and would host the ceremony at Castel Gandolfo. The Pope's spokesman subsequently said that the Pope had no "personal doctor" named Macchiarini, knew nobody of that name, and would not have officiated.

== In popular culture ==
A story published by Vanity Fair on 5 January 2016 discussed Macchiarini's affair with Alexander. The story also called into question statements he had made on his CV. The article paints him as a serial fabulist, and as "the extreme form of a con man", remarking that "the fact that he could keep all the details straight and compartmentalize these different lives and lies is really amazing."

On 31 October 2016, Macchiarini was the subject of a BBC Four Storyville miniseries entitled "Fatal Experiments: The Downfall of a Supersurgeon".

In August 2021, the third season of the Dr. Death podcast began publishing episodes consisting a six-episode season about Macchiarini, entitled "Miracle Man". The audio series covers the accusations of ethical misconduct and manipulation in Macchiarini's medical work alongside those of his personal deceit in his affair with Alexander, told through a series of interviews with the latter.

The second series of the podcast's television adaptation premiered on 21 December 2023 and centered on Macchiarini, portrayed by actor Édgar Ramírez.

A Netflix documentary, Bad Surgeon: Love Under the Knife, was released in late November 2023. It follows Macchiarini's rise and fall and the fight to bring him to justice. It includes an extended interview with Alexander.

== See also ==
- List of scientific misconduct incidents
