= 1865 (podcast) =

Historical fiction podcast

- Genre: history podcast, drama fiction podcast, fiction podcast

Publication
- No. of episodes: 70

Reception
- Ratings: 4.958/5

Related
- Website: https://wondery.com/shows/1865/

1865 is a historical fiction podcast produced by Airship and Wondery and written by Steven Walters as well as Erik Archilla with Lindsay Graham as the executive producer. The show follows Edwin Stanton in the wake of the assassination of Abraham Lincoln.

== Background ==
The podcast is a historical fiction podcast produced by Airship and Wondery. Erik Archilla and Steven Walters originally wrote the story for a class assignment while attending Baylor University. The executive producer of the show was Lindsay Graham. The episodes are about 30 minutes long. The story begins with the assassination of Abraham Lincoln. The podcast follows Edwin Stanton and delves into the impeachment of Andrew Johnson.

== Reception ==
Ben Cannon wrote in The A.V. Club that the show is "storytelling at its finest." Clint Smith wrote in The Atlantic that he "can't say enough good things about it." Jake Miller gave the podcast an A+ score in The Educator's Room and wrote that "1865 is a masterpiece." The podcast was nominated for the 2021 Podcast Awards for best audio drama.
