= Inside Jaws =

Horror and film history podcast

Cast and voices
- Hosted by: Mark Ramsey

Publication
- Original release: June 26 – August 7, 2018

Related
- Preceded by: Inside the Exorcist

Inside Jaws is a horror and film history podcast about Jaws created by Mark Ramsey and produced by Wondery.

== Background ==
The podcast debuted on June 26, 2018. The series consisted of seven episodes. The podcast sparked interest in the unsolved murder of Ruth Marie Terry. The podcast discusses the Jersey Shore shark attacks of 1916 and how they acted as the inspiration for the film. The possibility of a television adaptation of the podcast was discussed. The podcast uses both historical narration as well as acted dramatizations.

== Reception ==
Omar Sanchez wrote in The Hollywood Reporter that the podcast pays "attention to detail" when it comes to film history. Inkoo Kang criticized the Inside series in Slate Magazine for bolstering the "great (white) man theory" and ignoring the harmful repercussions of popular media's influence on the public. The podcast was nominated in the 2019 iHeartRadio Podcast Awards for best entertainment TV podcast.

== See also ==
- List of horror podcasts
- List of film and television podcasts
