= American History Tellers =

History podcast

- Genre: History

Cast and voices
- Hosted by: Lindsay Graham

Publication
- Original release: January 3, 2018
- Updates: Weekly on Mondays and Thursdays

Related
- Website: wondery.com/shows/american-history-tellers/

American History Tellers is a podcast by Wondery hosted by Lindsay Graham—not to be confused with U.S. Senator Lindsey Graham. Twice a week, Graham releases episodes recognized for their cinematic qualities. Through incorporating a mix of sound effects, dialogue, and narration, Graham emphasizes an immersive storytelling experience. The show premiered at #1 on the Apple Podcast charts and consistently ranks in the Top 20 U.S. history podcasts on Spotify and Apple Music.

== Background ==
Lindsay Graham is an American podcast host best known for American History Tellers and American Scandal (also by Wondery and consistently featured on the top podcast history charts). Although his background is in marketing—he worked in Southern Methodist University's marketing department and later in insurance—he lost his job in 2015. With a little extra time on his hands, Graham began working on his first project, Terms, a political audio drama featuring Dallas-based actors. The production gained some traction, and in 2017, Wondery approached him to host a podcast. Podcasts were experiencing exponential growth in popularity, and CEO Hernan Lopez wanted to produce a historical series. On January 3, 2018, Wondery released Season 1: The Cold War, which was written by historian Audra Wolfe and produced by Graham. As of 2025, there have been 83 seasons and 395 episodes.

== Format and Production ==
In alignment with Wondery's character-driven storytelling, the show features a POV narration style, telling stories through the perspectives of average and notable people. The podcast alternates between Graham providing background information, setting the scene, and acting as different real and hypothetical historical figures. By doing so, Graham portrays the effects of historical events on ordinary citizens' everyday lives. Graham and his team spend about one week conducting research and writing each episode, along with an additional two weeks spent in post-production.

== Seasons to date ==
The show has covered the following topics to date:

- Season One | The Cold War | January 2018
- Season Two | Prohibition | February 2018
- Season Three | The Age of Jackson | March 2018
- Season Four | The Space Race | May 2018
- Season Five | American Revolution | June 2018
- Season Six | National Parks | August 2018
- Season Seven | Civil Rights | October 2018
- Season Eight | Political Parties | November 2018
- Season Nine | The 1968 Chicago Protests | January 2019
- Season Ten | Great Depression | February 2019
- Season Eleven | J. Edgar Hoover's FBI | April 2019
- Season Twelve (Sponsored) | American Epidemics | May 2019
- Season Thirteen | Tulsa Race Massacre | May 2019
- Season Fourteen | The Bastard Brigade | July 2019
- Season Fifteen | Dutch Manhattan | September 2019
- Season Sixteen | The Triangle Shirtwaist Factory Fire | October 2019
- Season Seventeen | Kentucky Blood Feud | December 2019
- Season Eighteen | California Water Wars | January 2020
- Season Nineteen | What We Learned from the Spanish Flu | March 2020
- Season Twenty | Rebellion in the Early Republic | March 2020
- Season Twenty-One | The WWII Home Front | May 2020
- Season Twenty-Two | Encore: The Space Race | May 2020
- Season Twenty-Three | Stonewall | June 2020
- Season Twenty-Four | The Gilded Age | July 2020
- Season Twenty-Five | Encore: Political Parties | September 2020
- Season Twenty-Six | The Supreme Court | October 2020
- Season Twenty-Seven | Coal Wars | December 2020
- Season Twenty-Eight | Presidential Inaugurations: Traditions, Crisis, and Unity | January 2021
- Season Twenty-Nine | The Great Chicago Fire | January 2021
- Season Thirty | America's Monuments | February 2021
- Season Thirty-One | Bleeding Kansas | April 2021
- Season Thirty-Two | The Mystery of D.B. Cooper | May 2021
- Season Thirty-Three | Encore: Tulsa Race Massacre | May 2021
- Season Thirty-Four | Lost Colony of Roanoke | June 2021
- Season Thirty-Five | The Walker Affair | June 2021
- Season Thirty-Six | The Fight For the First U.S. Olympics | July 2021
- Season Thirty-Seven | Encore: National Parks | August 2021
- Season Thirty-Eight | Roaring Twenties | September 2021
- Season Thirty-Nine | Traitors | November 2021
- Season Forty | Philippine-American War | December 2021
- Season Forty-One | Billy the Kid | January 2022
- Season Forty-Two | The Plot to Steal Lincoln's Body | February 2022
- Season Forty-Three | The Fight for Women's Suffrage | March 2022
- Season Forty-Four | Lewis and Clark | April 2022
- Season Forty-Five | The Great Mississippi Flood | May 2022
- Season Forty-Six | Encore: The Age of Jackson | June 2022
- Season Forty-Seven | The Manson Murders | June 2022
- Season Forty-Eight | Civil War | July 2022
- Season Forty-Nine | Encore: The Walker Affair | September 2022
- Season Fifty | The Age of Pirates | October 2022
- Season Fifty-One | Yellow Fever Epidemic of 1793 | November 2022
- Season Fifty-Two | Presidential Assassinations | December 2022
- Season Fifty-Three | California Gold Rush | January 2023
- Season Fifty-Four | Insurrection of Aaron Burr | February 2023
- Season Fifty-Five | Hawaii's Journey to Statehood | March 2023
- Season Fifty-Six | Boston Molasses Disaster | April 2023
- Season Fifty-Seven | United Farm Workers | May 2023
- Season Fifty-Eight | Reconstruction Era | May 2023
- Season Fifty-Nine | Encore: Supreme Court Landmarks | July 2023
- Season Sixty | Encore: The World War II Home Front | September 2023
- Season Sixty-One | Salem Witch Trials | September 2023
- Season Sixty-Two | 1906 San Francisco Earthquake | October 2023
- Season Sixty-Three | Great American Authors | November 2023
- Season Sixty-Four | The Manhattan Project | January 2024
- Season Sixty-Five | Underground Railroad | February 2024
- Season Sixty-Six | Encore: Lewis and Clark | March 2024
- Season Sixty-Seven | World War I | April 2024
- Season Sixty-Eight | The Pinkerton Detective Agency | May 2024
- Season Sixty-Nine | The Hidden History of the White House | June 2024
- Season Seventy | Benjamin Franklin | June 2024
- Season Seventy-One | First Ladies | June 2024
- Season Seventy-Two | Encore: Presidential Assassinations | August 2024
- Season Seventy-Three | The Titanic | September 2024
- Season Seventy-Four | Jamestown | October 2024
- Season Seventy-Five | Transcontinental Railroad | November 2024
- Season Seventy-Six | FDR & Churchill | December 2024
- Season Seventy-Seven | Encore: Boston Molasses Disaster | December 2024
- Season Seventy-Eight | The Wright Brothers | January 2025
- Season Seventy-Nine | The Irish Famine Relief Mission | January 2025
- Season Eighty | Buffalo Soldiers | February 2025
- Season Eighty-One | Encore: The Fight for Women's Suffrage | March 2025
- Season Eighty-Two | The Carter Years | April 2025
- Season Eighty-Three | The Progressive Era | May 2025
- Season Eighty-Four | Typhoid Mary | June 2025
- Season Eighty-Five | Evolution on Trial | July 2025
- Season Eighty-Six | Encore: Insurrection of Aaron Burr | August 2025
- Season Eighty-Seven | Encore: California Gold Rush | August 2025
- Season Eighty-Eight | Daring prison escapes | September 2025
- Season Eighty-Nine | Shootout at the OK Corral | October 2025
- Season Ninety | The Mayflower | November 2025
- Season Ninety-One | The Ice King | December 2025
- Season Ninety-Two | Conquering Polio | January 2026
- Season Ninety-Three | St. Valentine's Day Massacre | February 2026
- Season Ninety-Four | 1900 Galveston Hurricane | April 2026
- Season Ninety-Five | Edison vs. Tesla | April 2026
- Season Ninety-Six | American Revolution | June 2026

== Seasons Listed in Rough Chronological Order/Topical Seasons ==
Season	Topic	Rough Start Date
34	Lost Colony Of Roanoke	1587
74	Jamestown	1607
90	The Mayflower	1620
15	Dutch Manhattan	1625
61	Salem Witch Trials	1692
50	The Age of Pirates	1700
70	Benjamin Franklin	1706
12	American Epidemics	1721
5	American Revolution	1775
39	Traitors	1776
26	The Supreme Court	1789
28	Presidential Inaugurations	1789
59	Encore: Supreme Court Landmarks	1789
71	First Ladies	1790
20	Rebellion in the Early Republic	1790
51	Yellow Fever Epidemic of 1793	1793
8	Political Parties	1796
25	Encore: Political Parties	1796
30	America's Monuments	1800
69	The Hidden History of the White House	1800
91	The Ice King	1801
44	Lewis and Clark	1804
66	Encore: Lewis and Clark	1804
54	Insurrection of Aaron Burr	1807
3	The Age of Jackson	1829
46	Encore: The Age of Jackson	1829
65	Underground Railroad	1830
79	The Irish Famine Relief Mission	1847
53	California Gold Rush	1848
43	The Fight for Women's Suffrage	1848
81	Encore: The Fight for Women's Suffrage	1848
35	The Walker Affair	1850
49	Encore: The Walker Affair	1850
63	Great American Authors	1850
68	The Pinkerton Detective Agency	1850
31	Bleeding Kansas	1854
41	Billy the Kid	1859
48	Civil War	1861
75	Transcontinental Railroad	1863
88	Daring Prison Escapes	1864
58	Reconstruction Era	1865
17	Kentucky Blood Feud	1865
52	Presidential Assassinations	1865
72	Encore: Presidential Assassinations	1865
80	Buffalo Soldiers	1866
24	The Gilded Age	1870
29	Great Chicago Fire	1871
37	Encore: National Parks	1872
42	The Plot to Steal Lincoln's Body	1876
89	Shootout at the O.K. Corral	1880
83	The Progressive Era	1890
55	Hawaii's Journey to Statehood	1898
40	Philippine-American War	1899
18	California Water Wars	1902
78	The Wright Brothers	1903
36	The Fight for the First U.S. Olympics	1904
62	1906 San Francisco Earthquake	1906
84	Typhoid Mary	1906
16	The Triangle Shirtwaist Factory Fire	1911
73	The Titanic	1912
27	Coal Wars	1913
67	World War I	1914
19	Spanish Flu	1918
56	Boston Molasses Disaster	1919
77	Encore: Boston Molasses Disaster	1919
2	Prohibition	1920
38	Roaring Twenties	1920
12	Tulsa Race Massacre	1921
33	Encore: Tulsa Race massacre	1921
92	Conquering Polio	1921
11	J. Edgar Hoover's FBI	1924
85	Evolution on Trial	1925
45	The Great Mississippi Flood	1927
10	The Great Depression	1929
21	The WWII Home Front	1941
60	Encore: WWII Home Front	1941
76	FDR and Churchill	1941
64	The Manhattan Project	1942
1	The Cold War	1947
7	Civil Rights	1954
4	The Space Race	1957
22	Encore: The Space Race	1957
57	United Farm Workers	1962
9	The 1968 Chicago Protests	1968
23	Stonewall	1969
47	The Manson Murders	1969
32	The Mystery of D.B. Cooper	1971
82	The Carter Years	1977

== Reception ==
American History Tellers has received mostly positive reviews. Many have noted the podcast's ability to go deeper into history, beyond what is taught in traditional U.S. history classrooms. The podcast is consistently featured on top charts and has even been referenced by celebrities such as George Clooney and Ryan Reynolds — who voiced a character for an April Fools' episode.

== See also ==
- List of history podcasts
- 1865
