= Generation Why (podcast) =

True crime podcast

Generation Why is a true crime podcast hosted by Aaron Habel and Justin Evans that debuted in 2012. According to a 2020 study, it was the most popular true crime podcast in the United States. It is recorded in Kansas City and distributed by Wondery.

== See also ==
- Criminology (podcast)
