= American Innovations =

History podcast

- Genre: Science, technology, history

Cast and voices
- Hosted by: Steven Johnson

Publication
- No. of episodes: 124
- Original release: April 27, 2018
- Provider: Wondery

Related
- Website: American Innovations – Wondery

American Innovations is a podcast by Wondery. The series is hosted by Steven Johnson covers the stories behind the innovations (science and technology) and their innovators.

The series is told through a series of stories that include point-of-view (PoV) narration as well as commentary from the host. The series is heavily sound designed and is known to use a range of sound effects.

== Seasons and episodes ==
American Innovations has covered the following topics:

=== Season 2018 ===
- Introduction to American Innovations 04/26/2018
- Series 1: Life's Building Blocks 05/10/2018
  - Life's Building Blocks | Lost Pioneers 05/10/2018
  - Life's Building Blocks | Civil War 05/10/2018
  - Life's Building Blocks | Double Helix 05/10/2018
  - Life's Building Blocks | The Race for the Genome 05/17/2018
  - Life's Building Blocks | Testing Times 05/24/2018
  - Life's Building Blocks | Return of the Mammoths 05/31/2018
  - Life's Building Blocks | Interview with Britt Wray 06/07/2018
- Series 2: Nuclear Energy
  - Nuclear Energy | E = MC Squared 06/14/2018
  - Nuclear Energy | Bombs Come First 06/21/2018
  - Nuclear Energy | Atoms For Peace 06/28/2018
  - Nuclear Energy | Meltdown 07/05/2018
  - Nuclear Energy | Backlash 07/12/2018
  - Nuclear Energy | A Glowing Future 07/19/2018
  - Nuclear Energy | Interview with James Mahaffee 07/26/2018
- Series 3: Thinking Machines
  - Thinking Machines| Artificial Intelligence 08/30/2018
  - Thinking Machines| How Do You Make a Computer Blink 09/06/2018
  - Thinking Machines | Siri-ous Business 09/13/2018
  - Thinking Machines | I Learn Therefore, I Am 09/20/2018
  - Thinking Machines | Passing For Human 09/27/2018
  - Thinking Machines | Garry Kasparov 10/04/2018
- Series 4: Preventing Paralysis
  - Preventing Paralysis | Marching Towards a Cure 10/11/2018
  - Preventing Paralysis | Can You Patent The Sun? 10/18/2018
  - Preventing Paralysis | The Fight Goes On 10/25/2018
  - Preventing Paralysis | And Stay Out! 11/01/2018
- Series 5: Conquering Pain
  - Conquering Pain | The Frolic 11/08/2018
  - Conquering Pain | The Swindle 11/15/2018
  - Conquering Pain | Ether Dreams 11/22/2018
- Interview | Stuff You Should Know 11/29/2018
- Series 6: Virtual Reality
  - Virtual Reality | The Sword of Damocles 12/06/2018
  - Virtual Reality | Simulation Sickness 12/13/2018
  - Virtual Reality I VR Gets Luckey 12/20/2018
- 2018's Best and Worst Tech Moments 12/27/2018

=== Season 2019 ===
- Bill Nye Wants to Save the World 01/17/2019
- Series 1: Rubber
  - Rubber: The Miracle Material | Bouncing Ideas 01/24/2019
  - Rubber: The Miracle Material | Things Heat Up 01/31/2019
  - Rubber: The Miracle Material | Trials and Tribulations 02/07/2019
- Making Decisions with Malcolm Gladwell 02/14/2019
- Series 2: Coca-Cola
  - Coca-Cola | The Cocaine Clinician 02/21/2019
  - Coca-Cola | The Perfect Package 02/28/2019
- Series 3: XX Factor
  - XX Factor | The Woman Who Put Man on the Moon 03/14/2019
  - XX Factor | Madam C.J. Walker 03/21/2019
  - XX Factor | Margaret Knight 03/28/2019
  - XX Factor | Hedy Lamarr 04/04/2019
- Jaron Lanier Wants You to Delete Social Media 04/11/2019
- Series 4: Airplane
  - Airplane | The Flight of the June Bug 04/18/2019
  - Airplane | Wrights and Wrongs 04/25/2019
  - Airplane | Rewriting Aviation History 05/02/2019
- Series 5: Star War's Cinema Technology
  - Star Wars' Cinema Technology | 6842 Valjean Ave 05/16/2019
  - Star Wars' Cinema Technology | The Saga Continues 05/23/2019
  - Star Wars' Cinema Technology | The Audience is Listening 05/30/2019
- Molly Wood: In A Changing Climate, How Can Tech Help Us Survive? 06/06/2019
- Series 6: The Birth Control Pill
  - The Birth Control Pill | But Can It Be Done? 06/13/2019
  - The Birth Control Pill | A Matter of Money 06/20/2019
  - The Birth Control Pill | Paradise and the Pill 06/27/2019
- Biologist Timothy Mousseau Can't Stop Going Back To Chernobyl 07/04/2019
- Series 7: Innovation Fails
  - Innovation Fails: DeLorean | Driven to Succeed 07/25/2019
  - Innovation Fails: DeLorean | Shifting Gears 08/01/2019
- Author Jason Torchinsky Talks Our Autonomous Future 08/08/2019
- The Heimlich Maneuver 08/15/2019
- Series 8: Corn Flakes
  - Corn Flakes | The Brothers of Battle Creek 08/22/2019
  - Corn Flakes | Crunch Time 08/29/2019
  - Corn Flakes | Kellogg vs Kellogg 09/05/2019
  - Sex, Cereal, and Nut Milks - The Complicated Legacy of the Kelloggs 09/12/2019
- Series 9: Skylabs
  - Skylab: NASA's Best-Kept Secret | Apollo's Leftovers 09/26/2019
  - Skylab: NASA's Best-Kept Secret | We Fix Anything 10/03/2019
  - Skylab: NASA's Best-Kept Secret | Falling Back to Earth 10/10/2019
- Series 10: Electric Chair
  - Electric Chair | War of the Currents 10/17/2019
  - Electric Chair | The War Becomes Electric 10/24/2019
  - Electric Chair | A Matter of Light and Death 10/31/2019
- Google's Quantum Breakthrough 11/14/2019
- The Modern Ambulance 11/21/2019
- Series 11: Kodak Roll Film
  - Kodak Roll Film | As Convenient as a Pencil 11/28/2019
  - Kodak Roll Film | Kodak Fiends 12/05/2019
  - Kodak Roll Film | Brownie Boom 12/12/2019

=== Season 2020 ===
- The Year in Innovation 01/09/2020
- Series 1: Electronic Television
  - Electronic Television | The Picture Radio 01/16/2020
  - Electronic Television | A Great Depression And The World's Fair 01/23/2020
  - Electronic Television | The TVs of The Future 01/30/2020
- MSNBC Presents: So, You Wanna Be President? with Chris Matthews 01/27/2020
- Series 2: Valium
  - Valium | Miltown Magic 02/06/2020
  - Valium | The House That Leo Built 02/13/2020
  - Valium | Mother's Little Helper 02/20/2020
- NBC News presents: Into America 03/02/2020
- Series 3: Organ Transplant
  - Organ Transplant | The Kidney Twins 03/05/2020
  - Organ Transplant | A Matter of Life and Death 03/12/2020
  - Organ Transplant | The Heart Race 03/19/2020
- Introducing Joe Exotic: Tiger King 03/24/2020
- Bruce Gellin On How COVID-19 Could Change Vaccine Development 03/26/2020

== See also ==
- Probably Science
- Big Picture Science
