= Black Men Can't Jump (In Hollywood) =

American comedy film review podcast

Black Men Can't Jump [In Hollywood]
- Genre: Comedy, film review
- Language: English

Cast and voices
- Hosted by: Jonathan Braylock; Jerah Milligan; James III

Publication
- Original release: July 26, 2015
- Provider: Forever Dog; Headgum (formerly)

Black Men Can't Jump [In Hollywood] is a comedic podcast that reviews the films of leading black actors and other actors of color and analyzes them in the context of how well the film truly promotes race diversity in Hollywood. The podcast had its inaugural episode on July 26, 2015. Most episodes focus on a single movie starring a leading actor of color. The podcast is hosted by Jonathan Braylock, Jerah Milligan, and James III. The podcast began on the Headgum network before moving to the Forever Dog network.

As of January 31, 2022 the podcast has released a total of 337 episodes.

== Series overview ==
In a 2018 Rotten Tomatoes article, when asked the question "do you consider yourself a critic?", Jonathan Braylock responded

We definitely critique movies, so in that sense we are critics. We just critique them on a different metric than most critics do. Most critics come in and they're judging it based on some idea of meritocracy. And we'll talk about that stuff too, but for the most part we're looking at how is this movie defining culture, and how is this movie establishing a precedent for actors of color.

How is it capitulating the stereotype? Is it making some sort of satire on, or some point about how America — and I guess the world — sees actors of color? What are the stories they're telling?

— Jonathan Braylock

=== Origins ===
Forged from a Facebook wall argument over Martin Lawrence's performance in Blue Streak, Black Men Can't Jump originally reviewed major studio films of leading black actors only but has since expanded to discuss films including other actors of color and widened its focus beyond major studio pictures to include independent films and films on streaming services such as Netflix. The three hosts are also close friends and are members of the New York-based improv and sketch comedy group Astronomy Club which is the first all-black house team at the Upright Citizen Brigade Theatre.

Jonathan Braylock, Jerah Milligan, and James III all provide a rating for each film reviewed. The ratings system is based on how much a film helps support more leading roles for black creators in modern-day Hollywood. The ratings are defined as "a black fist" (i.e. fully helps the cause), "a white palm" (i.e. somewhat helps the cause), and "nothing" (i.e. does not help the cause at all).

== Reception ==
Black Men Can't Jump has been positively reviewed by sources such as Forbes, Thrillist, PopSugar, Vulture, and Salon. In 2017, BMCJ was listed as one of the best comedy podcasts of the year by Paste magazine, one of the 10 Must-Listen Film Podcasts for Beginners and Fans Alike by IndieWire and one of 25 Culture Podcasts that Will Blow Your Mind by the BBC. In 2018, it was listed as the Best Movie Podcast on Vulture's Top Comedy Podcasts of the year and received the 2018 AV Club Podcast Superlative: "Best Companion To A 2018 Film" for their August 14, 2018 episode reviewing the film BlacKkKlansman by Spike Lee. In 2019, the show was listed as one of 10 Essential Pop Culture Podcasts by Vulture. In 2020, it was listed as one of the best film podcasts by the London Evening Standard and in 2021 it ranked number 4 on Screen Rant's top 10 Best Movie Review Podcasts. The show was listed as an iTunes Editor's Choice podcast and has reached #2 on the iTunes Film/TV charts.

== BMCJ bonus episodes ==
On February 4, 2019, BMCJ released their first bonus episode on what is now a defunct Patreon page that expanded their mission. On Patreon, they released bonus episodes that included blockbuster films with black actors in supporting roles (i.e. Birdbox, The Help, or any movie made before 1992), television shows with black leads (i.e. Atlanta or Insecure), and pop culture events (i.e. The Oscars, MTV Movie Awards, etc.). As of February 2022, their last episode on Patreon was released on March 2, 2020.

== See also ==
- List of film and television podcasts
