= Inside the Exorcist =

Horror and film history podcast

Cast and voices
- Hosted by: Mark Ramsey

Publication
- Original release: October 10 – November 2, 2017

Related
- Preceded by: Inside Psycho
- Followed by: Inside Jaws

Inside the Exorcist is a horror and film history podcast about The Exorcist created by Mark Ramsey and produced by Wondery.

== Background ==
The podcast contains seven episodes. The podcast was researched, written, and narrated by Mark Ramsey and Linda Blair and sound design by Jeff Schmidt. The podcast contains both fiction and nonfiction elements.

== Reception ==
Bryan Bishop wrote in The Verge that the show "is flat-out the scariest podcast that I've ever heard." Chelsea Tatham wrote in the Tampa Bay Times that the podcast "presents a chilling dive into the film's past". Alison Nastasi wrote in Flavorwire Magazine that the show is "drenched in demonic atmosphere". Juliana Colant wrote in The Post that the podcast is the "perfect binge-worthy series."

== See also ==
- List of horror podcasts
- List of film and television podcasts
