= Criminology (podcast) =

American true crime podcast

Criminology is a United States-based, true crime podcast hosted by Mike Ferguson and Mike Morford. Each season of the podcast focuses on a single, unsolved crime or criminal spree; it has previously covered the Zodiac Killer and the Golden State Killer. According to Laura Findlay, writing at Lifehacker, it is known for its "meticulous research".

== See also ==
- Generation Why (podcast)
