= Business Wars (video game) =

1992 video game

- Developer: Hect
- Publisher: Hect
- Composer: Norihiro Atsumi
- Platform: Family Computer
- Release: JP: January 24, 1992
- Genre: Adventure
- Mode: Single-player

Business Wars (ビジネスウォーズ) is a text adventure video game released for Japan's Family Computer.

== Gameplay ==
=== Summary ===
A lot of strategy is used when players have to make decisions and negotiate. Messages always arrive using the data feed style to make the game more business-like. The game can end with a loss if the wrong decision is made at the wrong time (similar to dying in an action game). The player will have to deal with loan sharks in the Caribbean, ruthless corporate executives from rival companies, arbitration sessions, and components that make the game look more like a strategy game at times. There are no items to use and very little action (with moving the guy around a virtual office building).

=== Actions ===
- みる (見る) Look
- かんがえる (考える) Think
- はなす (話す) Talk
- のむ (飲む) Drink
- でんわ (電話) Telephone
- たいさく (対策) Analyze
- いけん (意見) Opinion
- こうしょう (交渉) Negotiate
- いどう (移動) Move
