= Wondery =

American podcast network

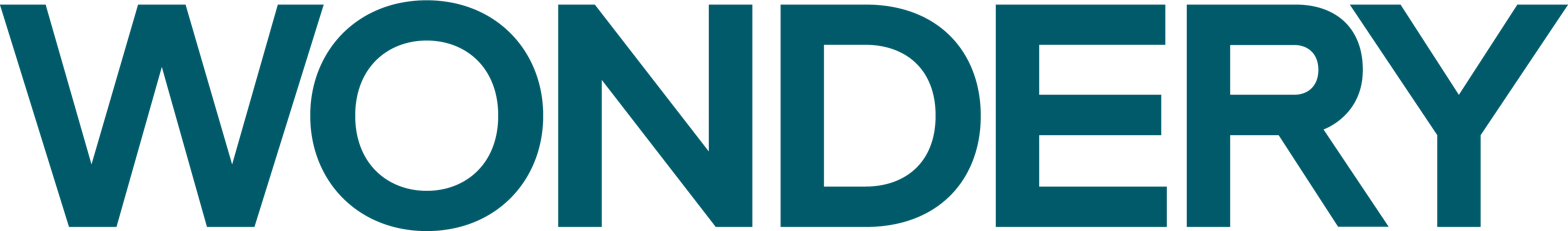
- Type: Podcast network (subsidiary)
- Country: United States
- Availability: International
- Parent: Amazon Music (Amazon Entertainment); (Amazon; 2020–present)
- Established: 2016; 10 years ago
- Official website: wondery.com

Wondery is an American podcast network and publisher of podcasts including American History Tellers, Dr. Death, Business Wars and The Shrink Next Door. Wondery was founded in 2016 by entrepreneur and media executive Hernan Lopez. The company was launched with backing from 20th Century Fox (now 20th Century Studios). In late 2020, it was announced that Wondery had been purchased by Amazon Music.

Several of Wondery's podcasts have been adapted for television, including Dirty John. Wondery has two premium subscription options, Wondery+ and Wondery+ Kids.

== History ==
=== Founding ===
Wondery was launched in 2016 by Hernan Lopez, the exiting Fox International Channels CEO with backing from what was then called 20th Century Fox. The stated goal of the network is to curate and create audio shows with a focus on mobile users and audio-on-demand. The company teamed up with ART19 on distribution infrastructure and cross podcast dynamic insertion of ads. Lopez was joined by Jeffrey Glaser, previously head of current programming at 20th Century Fox Television, where he oversaw series including 24, American Dad!, Arrested Development, Bones, Empire, Family Guy, Glee, How I Met Your Mother, Modern Family and The X-Files. Glaser was appointed president of content.

=== Funding ===
In addition to the initial financial backing from 20th Century Fox, Wondery has held multiple funding rounds. The company's series A funding round in March 2018 brought in $5 million from investors including Greycroft, Lerer Hippeau Ventures, and Shari Redstone's Advancit Capital venture-capital firms. Lopez announced plans to use the funding to add new original podcasts to the company’s roster. In June 2019, Wondery had a funding round of $10 million which indicates a value of over $100 million. Lopez stated that the funds would be used for international expansion, along with new content and technology. This series B funding was led by Waverley Capital. With the closing of the round, Former National Geographic Partners Chief Executive Declan Moore became Wondery's international programming head.

=== Growth ===
Within three years of its founding, Wondery became a top five podcast publisher with 40 million downloads in December 2018 alone. There were six 2019 iHeartRadio Podcast Award nominations for four of the publisher's show with one win: Dr. Death for Most Bingeable Podcast.

In 2018, Wondery began adapting some of its podcasts to television. That year, Bravo released the Dirty John TV series starring Connie Britton and Eric Bana. With 3.3 million viewers, Dirty John became Bravo’s most-watched new series in 4 and a half years. Wondery announced plans to adapt other podcasts to TV, including Dr. Death, Over My Dead Body, The Shrink Next Door, WeCrashed, American Sports Story and Joe vs. Carole. That year, Wondery also partnered with several celebrities who launched shows on the platform, including Ellen DeGeneres, Jillian Michaels, and Tina Brown.

In June 2018, Wondery announced the release of its premium subscription offering, Wondery+ on iOS and Android. For a monthly fee, Wondery+ subscribers receive ad-free podcasts, early downloads, and bonus materials.

The Walt Disney Company inherited Fox's stake in Wondery after Disney acquired 21st Century Fox's assets on March 20, 2019.

Universal Music Group agreed in April 2019 to allow Wondery a license to use UMG music catalog and develop UMG artists' story podcasts, which then may be adapted into TV or film projects. Wondery would work with all UMG labels and with its PolyGram Entertainment film and TV production unit.

In early May 2019, Wondery and Cumulus Media announced a strategic alliance for new advertising opportunities and growing podcast listeners. The first item from the alliance is a Business Wars podcast franchise expansion, Sports Wars, would start airing on 40 Cumulus radio stations the first weekend in May and syndicated by Westwood One, a Cumulus subsidiary.

Wondery announced in October 2019 that it was expanding its international initiatives by partnering with Ranieri and Co., a podcast company based in Australia and New Zealand that would serve as Wondery’s local representative. This partnership allowed brands in Australia and New Zealand access to Wondery’s podcast portfolio. Wondery had already had five top-ranking podcasts in Australia.

In 2020, the company released its own listening app for its subscribers. In 2021, Wondery+ became available to Apple users on Apple Podcast Subscriptions.

Also In 2020, Wondery podcasts won five Ambies at the first Awards for Excellence in Audio awards show hosted by The Podcast Academy. There were five award winners among Wondery’s roster at the 2020 iHeartRadio Podcast Awards and one at the 2021 iHeartRadio Podcast Awards.

In April 2020, Hernan Lopez CEO of Wondery was charged with wire fraud and money laundering in relation to attempts to win broadcast rights for Fox Broadcasting Company for the 2018 and 2022 FIFA World Cups. Lopez maintains his innocence, the trial was delayed to January 2023.

On April 28, 2020, Wondery announced a partnership with Al Jazeera Media Network to launch Business Wars and other flagship podcasts in Arabic via Al Jazeera Podcasts.

On May 16, 2020, Wondery was accused of negotiating with the Call Her Daddy podcast hosts while they were still under contract with their parent company, Barstool Sports.

It was reported in early 2021 that Wondery, together with Barstool Sports, NPR, iHeartRadio, and The Daily Wire comprised a group of companies that accounted for one-third of all advertising revenue generated by the entire podcasting industry during 2020.

In March 2021, Wondery sold the South African rights to its podcasts to African Media Entertainment, allowing for greater access to podcasts in the growing South African market.

In June 2021, Jason Bateman, Will Arnett and Sean Hayes’s podcast SmartLess was obtained by Wondery and Amazon Music.

In August 2021, Wondery and Amazon Music announced they had arranged an exclusive licensing and ad sales deal with another podcast company, Tinkercast. Newly released Tinkercast podcasts would be released one week early on Amazon Music and ad-free on Wondery+.

In September 2021, Wondery released a premium subscription service for children and families. Named Wondery+ Kids, the audio subscription is separate from Wondery+. It is available on Apple Podcasts, and is aimed at children ages four through 12. Shortly after launching Wondery+ Kids, the company announced a partnership with Gen-Z Media, which publishes children’s podcasts. Under the terms of the partnership, Wondery obtained exclusive rights to licensing, distribution, marketing, and advertising sales for a minimum of 18 podcasts, which are available ad-free on Wondery+ Kids.

In February 2022, How I Built This hosted by NPR's Guy Raz entered into an exclusive three year ad and licensing agreement with Wondery and Amazon Music.

In May 2022, Wondery became the first podcast platform to support Dolby Atmos, an audio format that allows for 3D surround sound. Support for Dolby Atmos is available to Wondery+ subscribers, with a free trial available.

Wondery began targeting the Italian market in July 2022 with a partnership with Acast. The deal enabled Acast to translate English-language series into Italian, beginning with the podcast Bunga, Bunga.

In 2022, Wondery’s podcasts picked up one Webby Award and two iHeartRadio Podcast Awards.

As of July 2022, Wondery jumped into the No. 2 spot for top podcast publishers in the U.S. according to Podtrac. Wondery surpassed the previous No. 2 spot holder, NPR. At that time, Wondery reported that its number of unique U.S. listeners had increased to 23.8 million, a 59% increase from the 15 million listeners it had in May.

=== Acquisition ===
On December 30, 2020, Amazon announced that they were acquiring Wondery under their Amazon Music division. The terms of the deal were not officially disclosed. However, it was reported by an anonymous source for The New York Times that the transaction was valued at about $300 million. At the time of the deal it was reported that Wondery was the largest independent podcast network. The deal was closed on February 10, 2021. At that time, Hernan Lopez stepped down as CEO, as previously planned when the acquisition was announced, and former Wondery COO Jen Sargent became the new CEO. Amazon announced that the acquisition would enable the growth of podcasts and bring greater accessibility to their domestic and international audiences.

Prior to the announcement of Amazon’s acquisition of Wondery, it was reported that Apple Inc. and Sony Music Entertainment had explored the possibility of purchasing the podcast publisher.

=== Restructuring ===
In August 2025, Amazon announced that Wondery's narrative podcasts would move to Audible (service) and video-focused podcasts would join Amazon's creator services team.

As part of these changes, Wondery CEO Jenn Sargent left the company, Chief Content Officer Marshall Lewy moved to work with Audible and roughly 110 employees were laid off.

== Organization ==
Jen Sargent was first hired as the chief operating officer (COO) at Wondery. Sargent was formerly the co-founder of HitFix and president of Uproxx Media Group. In 2021, Sargent was named as Wondery’s new CEO following Hernan Lopez’s departure.

Jeanine Percival Wright was hired as the COO following Sargent’s ascent to the CEO’s office. Wright was formerly chief financial officer and senior vice president of strategy and operations at AdsWizz. Wright is also serving as the general manager, overseeing revenue, new market expansion, partnerships, operations and licensing.

As of 2022, Marshall Lewy, served as the Chief Content Officer at Wondery. James Cator, former head of studios at Spotify for the U.K., joined Wondery as the head of commercial for Europe. In 2021, Nicole Blake, formerly of Warner Bros. and DreamWorks, served as the head of franchise development. Jessica Radburn, formerly Audible, served as the head of international podcast content. In 2020, Laurie Pracher served as the chief sales officer.

At the end of 2020, Wondery had approximately 80 staff members. Sargent announced that the company planned to double its staff during 2021, prioritizing the growth of its development team.

== Programming ==
Under the banner of Wondery, the network offers dozens of shows, including:

Current programming
Year	Title	Host or Starring	Genre	Co-producer	Notes	Ref.
2012	Generation Why	Aaron Habel and Justin Evans	Crime			
2014	Stories Podcast	Amanda Weldin and Dan Hinds	Children's stories			
2015	Juicy Scoop with Heather McDonald	Heather McDonald	Society and culture	Midroll		
2016	The Vanished Podcast	Marissa Jones	Crime			
2016	Real Crime Profile	Jim Clemente, Laura Richards, and Lisa Zambetti	Crime			
2016	What Should I Read Next?	Anne Bogel	Books			
2017	Dirty John	Christopher Goffard	Crime	Los Angeles Times	Adapted into the Dirty John series for Bravo	
2017	Tides of History	Patrick Wyman	History			
2018	American History Tellers	Lindsay Graham	History			
2018	American Innovations	Steven Johnson	History			
2018	American Scandal	Lindsay Graham	Crime			
2018	Business Wars	David Brown	Business		Won a Webby Award in 2019 and an iHeartRadio award in 2020 for Best Business & Finance Podcast	
2018	Dr. Death	Laura Beil	Crime		Won an iHeartRadio Podcast Award for Most Bingeable Podcast in 2019	
2018	Imagined Life	Virginia Madsen and Robbie Daymond	Society and culture		Won a Quartz podcast Award in 2018 for "Best podcast on the human condition" and "Best new podcast"	
2018	Legal Wars	Hill Harper	History			
2019	Bad Batch	Laura Beil	Crime			
2019	Blood Ties	Gillian Jacobs, Josh Gad, Amy Landecker, Dominic Monaghan, and Wayne Knight	Audio drama			
2019	The Mysterious Mr. Epstein	Lindsay Graham	Crime			
2019	The Shrink Next Door	Joe Nocera	Crime			
2019	Sports Wars	Dan Rubenstein	Sports		A Business Wars franchise expansion on 40 Cumulus Media stations and syndicated by Westwood One	
2019	1865		Historical fiction	Airship		
2020	Death of a Starlet	Tracy Pattin and Josh Lucas	Crime			
2020	Even The Rich	Aricia Skidmore-Williams and Brooke Siffrinn	Society and culture		A Wondery original series	
2020	Little Stories Everywhere	Various	Kids & Family			
2020	The Dating Game Killer	Stephen Lang and Tracy Pattin	Crime			
2020	The Daily Dish		Politics			
2021	Against the Odds	Mike Corey and Cassie De Pecol	History			
2021	Harsh Reality: The Story of Miriam Rivera	Trace Lysette	Crime			
2021	MANslaughter	Dorothy Marcic and Molly Peterson	Crime			
2021	Melon’s House Party	Various	Kids & Family			
2022	Twin Flames	Stephanie Beatriz	Crime			
2022	Whose Amazing Life?	Various	Kids & Family			
2024	Answers for Claudia	Tom McDermott	Crime	Ailsa Rochester	Disappearance of Claudia Lawrence	
2024	Fire Escape	Anna Sussman	Society and Culture		Co-production between Wondery and Snap Judgment	

Past Programming
Year	Title	Host or Starring	Genre	Co-producer	Notes	Ref.
2011	The History Chicks	Beckett Graham and Susan Vollenweider	Women's History		Moved to QCode	
2017	Inside Psycho	Mark Ramsey	Film			
2017	Inside the Exorcist	Mark Ramsey	Film			
2018	I, Survivor	Jenna Brister and Wagatwe Wanjuki	Society and culture			
2018	Inside Jaws	Mark Ramsey	Film			
2023	Six Trophies	Shea Serrano and Jason Concepcion	Sports		Wrapped after Wondery restructuring in August 2025	
2023	Over The Top	Michelle Beadle and Peter Rosenberg	Sports		Wrapped after Wondery restructuring in August 2025	
2024	Alternate Routes	Trey Wingo and Kevin Frazier	Sports		Co-produced by JJ Redick’s ThreeFourTwo Productions	
