= Business Wars (podcast) =

Business podcast

- Genre: Business
- Language: English

Cast and voices
- Hosted by: David Brown

Publication
- No. of seasons: 143
- No. of episodes: 600+
- Original release: January 20, 2018
- Provider: Audible Originals

Related
- Website: wondery.com/shows/business-wars/

Business Wars is a podcast hosted by David Brown and produced by Wondery. The podcast premiered on January 20, 2018, and consists of more than 150 episodes. By the end of 2018, it has been downloaded more than 15 million times.

It critically examines "business rivalries" between two organizations (or between two brands) and tries to derive a conclusion concerning the success or failure in the form of a single episode or a series of episodes.

== Seasons and episodes ==
=== Season 1 (2018) ===
- Netflix vs Blockbuster LLC
- Nike, Inc. vs Adidas
- Marvel Comics vs DC Comics
- IBM vs UNIVAC
- Sony vs Nintendo
- Hearst Communications vs Pulitzer
- eBay vs PayPal
- Coca-Cola vs Pepsi
- Southwest Airlines vs American Airlines
- Xbox vs PlayStation
- Napster vs The Record Labels
- Red Bull vs Monster Energy
- Browser Wars – Netscape vs Microsoft

=== Season 2 (2019) ===
- McDonald's vs Burger King
- United States Football League vs National Football League
- Death Row Records vs Bad Boy Records
- Hasbro vs Mattel
- Ferrari vs Lamborghini
- Netflix vs Blockbuster LLC Revisited
- Anheuser-Busch vs Miller Brewing Company
- Gibson vs Fender Musical Instruments Corporation
- Cereal Wars Kellogg’s vs. Post Consumer Brands vs. General Mills
- Harley-Davidson and the Biker Wars
- WWE vs World Championship Wrestling
- Facebook vs Snapchat
- Hershey vs Mars, Incorporated
- The Raisin Cartels
- Macy's vs Gimbels
- Ford Motor Company vs Chevrolet

=== Season 3 (2020) ===
- Boeing vs Airbus
- WeCrashed – The Rise and Fall of WeWork, a spin off
- Starbucks vs Dunkin' Donuts
- The North Face vs Patagonia, Inc.
- Amazon vs Walmart
- Business Battles
- Uber vs Lyft
- Playboy vs. Penthouse
- Diamond Wars - De Beers
- Dating App Wars - Match.com vs. EHarmony vs. Tinder vs. Grindr vs. Bumble
- FedEx vs UPS
- Pizza Hut vs Domino's Pizza
- E & J Gallo Winery: The Godfathers of Wine
- Denim Wars - Levi's vs Lee vs Wrangler (jeans) vs Calvin Klein Inc.
- TikTok vs Instagram
- Encore: Hasbro vs Mattel

=== Season 4 (2021) ===
- SpaceX vs Blue Origin
- Estee Lauder Companies vs L'Oréal
- Late Night Wars - The Tonight Show vs. The Late Show
- KFC vs Chick-fil-A
- Vaccine Wars - Moderna vs. BioNTech vs. Johnson & Johnson vs. AstraZeneca
- Food Delivery Wars - Uber Eats vs. DoorDash vs. Grubhub vs. Postmates
- Bacardi vs. Pernod Ricard
- The Birth of Vegas
- Fast Fashion - TopShop vs. Zara vs. H&M vs. Forever 21 vs. Shein
- Crypto Wars
- BlackBerry vs. iPhone
- Christmas Movie Wars - The Hallmark Channel vs. Lifetime

=== Season 5 (2022) ===
- ESPN vs. Fox Sports
- Airbnb vs. New York City
- Tesla vs. Detroit
- Häagen-Dazs vs. Ben & Jerry’s
- Gucci vs. Louis Vuitton
- Diet Wars
- The Battle for Paramount Pictures
- Taylor Swift vs. Scooter Braun
- Taco Bell vs. Chipotle
- Toyota vs. Honda
- Christie's vs. Sotheby's

=== Season 6 (2023) ===
- Apple vs. Microsoft
- Disney-Pixar vs. DreamWorks
- 5th Anniversary Special
- Target vs. Walmart
- Subway vs. Quiznos
- Hilton vs. Marriott
- The Rise of AI
- CVS vs. Walgreens
- Toys R Us vs. KB Toys

== Reception and awards ==
As of January 2023, Business Wars has earned 12 podcast industry honors with 4 wins. These include:

- Winner of 2022 and 2023 Ambie Award for Best Business Podcast
- Winner of 2019 Webby Award for Best Business Podcast
- Winner of 2020 IHeartRadio Podcast Award – Best Business and Finance Podcast.

Business Wars has been listed at number 4 in the top 10 business podcast list by Inc.. Also, in the year 2018, it was mentioned by Fortune as one of the best business podcasts.

== See also ==
- Masters of Scale
- Planet Money
