= Dr. Death (podcast) =

American true crime podcast

- Genre: True Crime

Cast and voices
- Hosted by: Laura Beil

Publication
- No. of seasons: 4
- No. of episodes: 42
- Original release: September 4, 2018
- Provider: Wondery

Related
- Adaptations: Dr. Death (2021 TV series)
- Website: Dr. Death – Wondery

Dr. Death is a podcast produced by Wondery that focuses on egregious cases of medical malpractice. The podcast is hosted and reported by Laura Beil and premiered September 4, 2018.

Season 1 tells the story of Christopher Duntsch, a Texas neurosurgeon who was convicted of gross malpractice after 31 of his patients were left seriously injured after he operated on them, and 2 patients died during his operation.

Season 2 focuses on Farid Fata, a hematologist and oncologist convicted for prescribing chemotherapy to patients who either didn't have cancer or whose condition did not warrant chemotherapy. He pled guilty to charges of healthcare fraud, money laundering, and conspiring to pay and receive kickbacks.

Season 3 focuses on Paolo Macchiarini, a Swiss-born Italian thoracic surgeon and regenerative medicine researcher who became known for research fraud and unethical experiments in synthetic tracheas that led to the deaths of several patients, as well as the experience of his former fiancé Benita Alexander, who reveals Macchiarini's extensive fraud in their relationship in a series of interviews.

Season 4 focuses on Serhat Gumrukcu, an HIV and cancer researcher.

== Episodes ==
=== Season 1 - "Doctor Duntsch" (2018-2020) ===
No. in season	Title	Original release date
1	"Three Days In Dallas"	September 4, 2018
2	"Chris and Jerry"	September 4, 2018
3	"Occam’s Razor"	September 7, 2018
4	"Spineless"	September 11, 2018
5	"Free Fall"	September 18, 2018
6	"Closure"	September 25, 2018
7	"Update"	October 2, 2018
8	"Interview"	October 9, 2018
9	"One Great Man"	November 13, 2018
10	"Breaking News"	December 13, 2018
11	"An Update: Love and Loyalty"	November 24, 2020

=== Season 2 - "Dr. Fata" (2020) ===
No. in season	Title	Original release date
1	"Top Doc"	October 26, 2020
2	"King Midas"	October 26, 2020
3	"Living with this Hell"	November 2, 2020
4	"Seeing Yellow"	November 9, 2020
5	"A Duntsch Update: Love and Loyalty"	November 16, 2020
6	"How to Spot a Dr. Death"	November 23, 2020
7	"Reporting Dr. Death"	November 30, 2020

=== Season 3 - "Miracle Man" (2021) ===
No. in season	Title	Original release date
1	"Head Over Heels"	August 16, 2021
2	"The Secret Society of International Surgeons"	August 16, 2021
3	"Lab Rats"	August 24, 2021
4	"Barcelona, My Love"	August 31, 2021
5	"Black Sabbath"	September 7, 2021
6	"The Fog of Lies"	September 14, 2021
7	"An Interview with Benita"	September 21, 2021

=== Season 4 - "Black Magic" (2024) ===
No. in season	Title	Original release date
1	"The Man in the Linen Pants"	January 22, 2024
2	"The Golden Kid"	January 22, 2024
3	"Language of Angels"	January 29, 2024
4	"The Closing Bell"	February 5, 2024
5	"The Data are the Data"	February 12, 2024
6	"The Lawsuit"	February 19, 2024

== Promotion ==
Wondery promoted the podcast by renting ad space on a billboard directly across the street from Baylor Plano where Dr. Death subject Christopher Duntsch had worked. The billboard was covered up hours after it was erected by Clear Channel Outdoor after they received several complaints; Baylor Plano denied any involvement with the removal of the billboard.

== Reception ==
Dr. Death received mostly positive reviews. The show won Most Bingeable Podcast at the 2019 iHeartRadio Podcast Awards. GQ Magazine called it "The scariest podcast of the year." Season two of the show received the 2021 Ambies award for "Best True Crime Podcast".

== TV adaptation ==
On October 3, 2018, it was announced that Universal Cable Productions had put the TV series into development. Happy! show runner Patrick Macmanus will executive produce and write the script.

== See also ==
- The Shrink Next Door
- List of American crime podcasts
