= Marshall Lewy =

Marshall Lewy was the chief content officer of Wondery, before Amazon broke up the podcast studio in August 2025. As such, he served as a non-writing executive producer on a number of Wondery's podcasts.

Previously, he was a partner at Adaptive Studios, a Hollywood company that acquired scripts that were tabled by larger studios and then attempted to produce them, with some success.

Lewy was also the director of the 2012 film California Solo, which premiered at the 2012 Sundance Film Festival, and the 2007 film Blue State.

Lewy graduated from Harvard College and received his MFA from Columbia University.
