= Jenna Weiss-Berman =

American podcast producer

Jenna Weiss-Berman (born 1983) is an American podcast producer who is the Head of Audio & Podcasts at Paper Kite Productions. She co-founded Pineapple Street Studios (formerly Pineapple Street Media) and was previously director of audio for BuzzFeed.

== Early life ==
Weiss-Berman is a native of Massachusetts and graduated from Oberlin College in 2005.

== Career ==
=== Public Radio ===
In 2012, Weiss-Berman completed the Transom Story Workshop, a nine-week, radio storytelling intensive. Following a stint at The Moth, where she served as Head of Production, she joined NPR, co-creating and producing Hidden Brain.

=== BuzzFeed ===
After almost a decade working in public radios like The Moth, WNYC's Death, Sex and Money, and The Longform Podcast, Weiss-Berman started the podcast department at BuzzFeed where she was responsible for the ground-up development of the successful company’s audio arm," creating shows like Another Round and Women of the Hour with Lena Dunham. While there, she was responsible for every aspect of the podcast department from legal contracts, finding sponsorships and the content itself as a producer.

=== Pineapple Street Studios ===
In 2016, she left BuzzFeed to launch Pineapple Street Media, a Brooklyn-based full-service podcast production company, with her friend, Longform co-founder, Max Linsky. Weiss-Berman has said that the goal was to be able to make podcasts for non-audio companies and the decision to launch Pineapple Street came after both she and Linksy turned down many such requests.

Pineapple Street's early clients included The New York Times, Lena Dunham's Lenny Letter and ad agency Wieden+Kennedy. In the summer of 2016, Hillary Clinton's presidential campaign hired Pineapple Street to produce a podcast (the first ever for a presidential candidate). Clinton and Linsky co-hosted the show, called With Her.

Pineapple Street Media has partnered with brands like Coach, Nike, Morgan Stanley, Mailchimp, Mastercard and Google, and produced critically-acclaimed original series like Missing Richard Simmons, Running From COPS, The Clearing, The Catch and Kill Podcast with Ronan Farrow, Wind of Change, Back Issue and Welcome to Your Fantasy.

In 2017, she was named one of Fast Company’s 100 Most Creative People in Business.

In 2019, Pineapple Street Media was sold to Audacy (formerly Entercom) and rebranded as Pineapple Street Studios. She remained with Audacy, and in 2023 was elevated to Executive Vice President of Podcasts, where she oversaw Audacy’s podcast network and studios, including Pineapple Street Studios and Cadence13, along with strategy and development of new podcast content and distribution partnerships.

=== Paper Kite Productions ===
In 2025, Weiss-Berman left Audacy to join Amy Poehler's Paper Kite Productions as Head of Audio & Podcasts. She and Poehler co-created and launched Good Hang with Amy Poehler, which won the first Golden Globe Award for Best Podcast.

=== Other ===
Weiss-Berman currently sits on the advisory board of The Moth. In 2025, she was appointed as a member of New York Public Radio’s Board of Trustees.

Weiss-Berman partnered with celebrity chef Ina Garten to create Happy Hour with Ina Garten, a forthcoming video podcast set to launch in September 2026. The project sparked a bidding war, with Vox Media securing the show in a reported seven-figure deal.

== Awards ==
Weiss-Berman was a winner of the Gracie Award Grand Award for Podcast in 2016, for her collaboration with Lena Dunham on podcast Woman of the Hour, initially produced at BuzzFeed, then later at Pineapple Street.

In 2020, Pineapple Street Studios led all podcast companies with two Peabody Award nominations for The Catch and Kill Podcast with Ronan Farrow and Running From COPS. That year, The Catch and Kill Podcast with Ronan Farrow won the Edward R. Murrow Award for Best Podcast.

Pineapple Street’s Wind of Change received three awards at the 2021 Ambies, including Best Reporting. Additionally, it won Webby People’s Voice Awards for Best Documentary (Limited-Series & Specials) and Best Limited Series (Features).

In 2022, Pineapple Street Studios won a National Magazine Award for two episodes of The 11th,” hosted by Hanif Abdurraqib: “Time Machine: The Score (Side A),” and “Time Machine: The Score (Side B).

Weiss-Berman has executive produced more than twenty podcasts that have reached #1 on the Apple charts, including Hysterical, a 2025 Pulitzer Prize finalist, Ambie award winner, and Apple’s 2024 Podcast of the Year.

The Alliance for Women in Media recognized Weiss-Berman as one of the recipients of its 2025 Gracies Leadership Awards.

In 2026, Weiss-Berman was named to Cultured Magazine’s “CULT 100” list of the 100 people who define culture.

== Personal life ==
Weiss-Berman is married to writer Kira Garcia.
