= Pineapple Street Studios =

American podcasting company

- Type: Subsidiary
- Industry: Podcasts
- Founded: 2016; 10 years ago
- Founders: Jenna Weiss-Berman; Max Linsky
- Defunct: June 27, 2025; 16 months ago
- Headquarters: Brooklyn, New York City, New York
- Key people: Jenna Weiss-Berman (Co-founder); Max Linsky (Co-founder)
- Parent: Audacy, Inc. (2019-2025)
- Website: pineapple.fm

Pineapple Street Studios (formerly Pineapple Street Media) was a podcast studio based in Brooklyn, New York. In August 2019, it was acquired by Entercom (now Audacy, Inc.). Pineapple's work includes multi-episode narratives, investigative journalism, branded podcasts, and talk shows. They have created series for companies like Nike, Hulu, Netflix, HBO, and The New York Times. In 2020, they led all podcast companies with two Peabody Award nominations, for The Catch and Kill Podcast with Ronan Farrow and Running From Cops. Twelve of their shows have reached #1 on Apple Podcasts.

== History ==
Pineapple Street Media was founded in 2016 by former BuzzFeed head of audio Jenna Weiss-Berman and Longform co-founder Max Linsky.

In August 2016, Pineapple released With Her, a commissioned podcast following Hillary Clinton's presidential campaign (the first to be hosted by a candidate for US President). Max Linsky co-hosted.

In September 2016, in collaboration with The New York Times, Pineapple launched Still Processing, a culture podcast hosted by Jenna Wortham and Wesley Morris.

Pineapple teamed with filmmaker Dan Taberski on a series of investigative podcasts: Missing Richard Simmons, Surviving Y2K and Running from Cops. Missing Richard Simmons spent almost three weeks as the #1 series on Apple Podcasts. Vulture called it "brilliant" and "the strongest narrative podcast out there."

In 2017, they helped in the production of the podcast for Wormwood on Netflix. Errol Morris, the director, converses with multiple guests about the circumstances of Frank Olson's death and CIA involvement. Guests include: Jon Ronson (author of The Men Who Stare at Goats), Peter Sarsgaard (lead actor), Eric Olsen (son of Frank Olson).

In October 2019, it was announced that HBO Max greenlit a television adaptation of Pineapple and Stitcher's podcast, Heaven's Gate. Heaven's Gate: The Cult of Cults, a four-part documentary series, premiered on HBO Max on December 3, 2020.

In association with Gimlet Media, Pineapple produced The Clearing, a docu-series about April Balascio and her father, serial killer Edward Wayne Edwards. It reached #1 on Apple Podcasts. The Guardian described the series as an "immense achievement." On December 18, 2019, Deadline announced that a television adaptation was in the works with Chernin Entertainment and Weimaraner Republic Pictures.

In partnership with investigative reporter Ronan Farrow, Pineapple debuted The Catch and Kill Podcast with Ronan Farrow, an audio companion to Farrow's bestselling book, Catch and Kill: Lies, Spies and a Conspiracy to Protect Predators. It won the 2020 Edward R Murrow Award for Best Podcast. Farrow also won a 2020 Webby People's Voice Award for Best Host.

With Crooked Media and Spotify, Pineapple produced Wind of Change. The series, hosted by writer and journalist Patrick Radden Keefe, was selected as one of the best podcasts of 2020 by The Guardian (#1 overall), The Atlantic, The New York Times, Rolling Stone and The New Yorker. Hulu is adapting the podcast for television with Alex Karpovsky signed on to write and executive produce. The podcast explored the theory that the 1990 Scorpion's song Wind of Change was Cold War propaganda, written by the CIA.

In August 2020, Pineapple launched Back Issue, a look at formative moments in pop culture, hosted by writer Tracy Clayton and Pineapple producer Josh Gwynn. On the series, The New York Times wrote, "Tracy Clayton and Josh Gwynn use their encyclopedic memory of pop culture moments as a balm in trying times." It was featured on Time and The Atlantic's lists of the best podcasts of 2020.

In early January 2024, it was announced that their parent company Audacy would be preparing to file for bankruptcy within the upcoming weeks. On January 7, 2024, Audacy filed for Chapter 11 bankruptcy protection. As part of the bankruptcy reorganization, Audacy has made a deal with its creditors to transfer control to them while cutting approximately $1.6 billion of its debt.

In June 2025, Audacy announced the closure of Pineapple Street Studios as a result of reduced investment in audio production.

== Shows ==
=== Original podcasts ===
Title	Host(s)	Description
Back Issue	Tracy Clayton & Josh Gwynn	Back Issue tells the stories behind formative moments in pop culture.
The C-Word	Lena Dunham & Alissa Bennett	Lena Dunham and Alissa Bennett take listeners on a historical deep-dive into the life of a woman society dismissed by calling her mad, sad, or just plain bad.
The Catch and Kill Podcast	Ronan Farrow	An inside look at Ronan Farrow's investigation of Harvey Weinstein.
The Clearing	Josh Dean	When April Balascio was 40 years old, something she'd feared for decades was finally proven true—her father, Edward Wayne Edwards, was a murderer.
Doctor's Log	Esther Choo	Dr. Esther Choo, an emergency room physician in Portland, Oregon, delivers reports from the front lines of the coronavirus crisis.
Heaven's Gate	Glynn Washington	In 1997, thirty-nine people took their own lives in an apparent mass suicide. 20 years later, those who lost loved ones and those who still believe – tell their story.
Headlong: Missing Richard Simmons	Dan Taberski	On February 15, 2014, fitness guru Richard Simmons disappeared. What happened? Filmmaker Dan Taberski leads listeners down a winding road to find the star.
Headlong: Running From COPS	Dan Taberski	Dan Taberski investigates COPS — the longest running reality show in TV history — and its cultural impact on policing in America.
Headlong: Surviving Y2K	Dan Taberski	Dan Taberski takes listeners back to the turn of the millennium to meet the people for whom it was anything but a joke.
The Kids Are All...Home	Max Linsky	A podcast for kids stuck at home, by kids stuck at home.
Making Gay History	Eric Marcus	Intimate, personal portraits of both known and long-forgotten champions, heroes, and witnesses to history.
Never Before with Janet Mock	Janet Mock	Janet Mock and special guests talk about work, love and life—like you've never heard before.
Stay Tuned with Preet	Preet Bharara	Former U.S. Attorney Preet Bharara breaks down legal topics in the news and engages thought leaders in a podcast about power, policy, and justice.
Suspicious Activity: Inside the FinCEN Files	Azeen Ghorayshi, Jason Leopold and Anthony Cormier	A five-part series investigating how the most powerful banks in the world can facilitate the worst of humanity – terrorism, human trafficking, the drug trade – all in plain sight of the government.
Underdog	Eric Benson	A behind-the-scenes of the most expensive, most talked-about political race of 2018: the U.S. Senate contest between Beto O'Rourke and Ted Cruz.
UNDISTRACTED	Brittany Packnett Cunningham	Brittany Packnett Cunningham examines the most pressing issues of our time through the lens of intersectional feminism.
Unhappy Hour with Matt Bellassai	Matt Bellassai	Matt Bellassai and special guests vent about all things political, personal and cultural.
Welcome to Your Fantasy	Dr. Natalia Mehlman Petrzela	Historian Natalia Petrzela exposes one of the great, sordid, unexamined stories in American culture.
Wind of Change	Patrick Radden Keefe	A power ballad helped bring down the Soviet Union. Was it written by the CIA? Journalist Patrick Radden Keefe investigates.
With Her	Max Linsky	Coverage of Hillary Clinton's 2016 presidential campaign.
Women of the Hour	Lena Dunham	A miniseries about friendship, love, work, bodies and more.
The 11th		

=== Podcasts for brands and editorial partners ===
Title	Host(s)	Description
30 For 30 (ESPN)		Captivating stories from the world of sports and beyond.
Behind the Scenes (Netflix)	Brandon 'Jinx' Jenkins	Brandon Jenkins talks to showrunners, writers, voice actors and other creators.
The Chernobyl Podcast (HBO)	Peter Sagal & Craig Mazin	The official podcast of the miniseries Chernobyl, from HBO and Sky.
Dream it Real (Coach)	Heben Nigatu	A podcast for those who dream, produced by Coach.
The Gateway (Gizmodo)	Jennings Brown	A six-part series about Teal Swan, a spiritual guru, who draws in followers with hypnotic self-help YouTube videos.
Going Through It (Mailchimp)	Tracy Clayton	Black women discuss a pivotal moment when they decided it was time to make a change.
Hard Knocks (HBO)	Peter Schrager	Peter Schrager and guests break down episodes of Hard Knocks.
I'm Obsessed With This (Netflix)	Bobby Finger	Bobby Finger invites guests — fans, critics, friends — to gab about the most-discussed titles of the moment.
Julie: The Unwinding of the Miracle (Random House)	Julie Yip-Williams	The series chronicles Julie Yip-Williams' process of preparing for her death and revisiting the events of her extraordinary life.
Lovecraft Country Radio (HBO)	Ashley C. Ford & Shannon Houston	The official podcast for HBO's Lovecraft Country.
No Man's Land (The Wing)	Alexis Coe	A podcast about women who were too bad for textbooks.
Noisemakers (Spotify/Time's Up)	Ashley Nicole Black and Chelsea Devantez	A 6-part series which examines the impact of harassment, gender inequality, and pay inequity on women in the workplace.
The Official Watchmen Podcast (HBO)	Craig Mazin	Host Craig Mazin discusses Watchmen with its Executive Producer and Writer, Damon Lindelof.
Okay, Now Listen (Netflix)	Scottie Beam & Sylvia Obell	Scottie Beam and Sylvia Obell share what's on their minds, what they're binging and what's blowing up their timelines.
The Plot Against America Podcast (HBO)	Peter Sagal	Host Peter Sagal discusses the adaptation and production of The Plot Against America with creator and executive producer David Simon.
Still Processing (New York Times)	Wesley Morris & Jenna Wortham	Wesley Morris and Jenna Wortham talk television, film, books, music — but also the culture of work, dating, the internet and how those all fit together.
Strong Black Lead (Netflix)	Tracy Clayton	Tracy Clayton sits down with the legends that paved the way for black representation both on and off screen.
TRAINED (Nike)	Ryan Flaherty	Mindset. Movement. Nutrition. Recovery. Sleep.
WorkLife with Adam Grant (TED)	Adam Grant	Organizational psychologist Adam Grant takes you inside the minds of some of the world's most unusual professionals.
You Can't Make This Up (Netflix)	Rebecca Lavoie	Rebecca Lavoie (Crime Writers On...) digs into the real stories behind Netflix Original true crime series and films.
Your Attention Please (Hulu)	Kimberly Drew	Kimberly Drew gets to know Black visionaries who are defining the future and inspiring the world.
