= List of documentary podcasts =

The following is a list of documentary podcasts.

== List ==
Podcast	Year	Starring, Narrator(s), or Host(s)	Produced by	Ref
Gangster Capitalism	2019-2021	Danielle Dardashti and Galeet Dardashti		
Dolly Parton's America	2019	Jad Abumrad		
Floodlines	2020	Vann R. Newkirk II		
Uncover	2018-present	Various hosts		
Catch And Kill	2021			
The Trojan Horse Affair	2022			
Harsh Reality: The Story Of Miriam Rivera	2021			
WeCrashed: The Rise And Fall Of WeWork	2022			
Scene on Radio	2015			
Surviving Y2K	2018			
Caliphate	2018			
David Ortiz: The Big Papi Story	2018			
American Fiasco	2018			
30 For 30 Podcasts	2009-present			
Rabbit Hole	2020	Kevin Roose	The New York Times	
This American Life	1995-present			
Criminal	2014			
Mystery Show	2015			
Planet Money	2008			
Reply All	2014-2022			
S-Town	2017			
Serial	2014-2024			
Snap Judgement	2010			
StartUp	2014-present			
Up and Vanished	2016-2018			
Blindspot	2020–2021	Jim O'Grady	History and WNYC Studios	
Slow Burn	2017-present			
The Log Books	2020			
The Shrink Next Door	2019			
Ear Hustle	2017			
Missing Richard Simmons	2017			
Finding Tamika	2023			
Black History in Two Minutes	2021			
Al Jazeera Investigates - The Labour Files Episode 1	2006-present			
Punk In Translation	2022			
We Interrupt This Broadcast: Before it was history, it was news	2023	Bill Kurtis, Brian Williams		
The Promise	2018-present			
The Nightingale of Iran	2024			
