= Heaven's Gate (podcast) =

Documentary podcast by Pineapple Street Media

- Genre: True crime

Creative team
- Written by: Dan Taberski

Cast and voices
- Hosted by: Glynn Washington

Publication
- No. of episodes: 10
- Original release: October 18, 2017

Heaven's Gate is a podcast hosted by Glynn Washington, written by Dan Taberski, and produced by Pineapple Street Media. The 10 episode Stitcher original podcast is a documentary focused on the Heaven's Gate cult.

== Background ==
The podcast is a documentary about the new religious movement Heaven's Gate, which is often described as a cult. The podcast discusses how Bonnie Lu Nettles and Marshall Applewhite (known within the group as Ti and Do respectively) convinced their followers to leave their families to join them. Glynn Washington discusses the members of the group, as well as their friends and family, and reflects on how someone might end up joining a group like Heaven's Gate. Washington himself grew up in the Worldwide Church of God under Herbert W. Armstrong, which taught beliefs known collectively as Armstrongism, described as a cult by Walter Ralston Martin in his book The Kingdom of the Cults (1965). Washington left the group at the age of 19. The group is now known as Grace Communion International. Washington was fascinated by the events that took place in large part because of the similarities to the group he grew up in, which held similarly apocalyptic beliefs.

The podcast debuted on October 18, 2017, and contains 10 episodes. The show was produced in the Sun Basket production studio and produced by Pineapple Street Media as a Stitcher original. Benjamin Zeller, author and professor of religion at Lake Forest College, guided the project with his research on the group. Dan Taberski acted as writer for the show. The show uses archived audio in addition to new interviews. The podcast includes testimonials from members of the group as well as friends and family of members. The show was nominated for best documentary podcast in the 2018 Webby Awards.
