= Running From Cops =

2019 podcast by Dan Taberski

Cast and voices
- Hosted by: Dan Taberski

Related
- Preceded by: Surviving Y2K
- Followed by: The Line

Running From Cops is a podcast hosted by Dan Taberski and produced by Pineapple Street Media and Topic Studios.

== Background ==
Running From Cops is the third installment in Taberski's Headlong series—the first and second being Missing Richard Simmons and Surviving Y2K respectively. The podcast was hosted by Dan Taberski and produced by Pineapple Street Media and Topic Studios. The podcast debuted in April 2019. The show explores the television program Cops and explores how the show distorts reality. The first episode of the podcast discusses how Cops is still producing episodes even after 31 seasons and over 1,000 episodes. The third episode discusses how the show was criticized by a civil rights group. The podcast discusses how Cops has affected people. The podcast discusses how Cops has increased recruitment for police department. The podcast released a total of six episodes. Steve Greene wrote in IndieWire that the podcast "is the meticulous product of a year and a half of thorough and intensely focused societal examination." Laura Jane Standley and Eric Mcquade wrote in The Atlantic that Headlong is "excellent work" and that Running From Cops "[reveals] unexpected truths about American culture." Nic Dobija-Nootens wrote in Podcast Review that "[y]ou don't need to be familiar with Cops to appreciate the podcast's revelations."
