= Still Processing =

Pop culture podcast by the New York Times

- Genre: Culture
- Language: English

Cast and voices
- Hosted by: J Wortham; Wesley Morris

Production
- Length: About 45 minutes

Publication
- Original release: September 8, 2016
- Provider: The New York Times
- Updates: Weekly

Still Processing was a New York Times culture podcast hosted by J Wortham, a writer for The New York Times Magazine, and Wesley Morris, the paper's critic at large. The show debuted on September 8, 2016. Still Processing won a 2017 Webby Award in the Podcast & Digital Audio category, and was nominated for a 2019 Shorty Award.

== History ==
Morris joined The New York Times from The Boston Globe in 2015 with a podcast as part of his new contract and approached Wortham about serving as co-host. Developed under the working title Feelings, the show launched as Still Processing on September 8, 2016, part of a collaboration between The New York Times and Pineapple Street Media to expand Times podcasts offerings.

The first season ran from September 26, 2016, to March 2, 2017. The last episode was released on December 6, 2022.

== Production ==
Morris and Wortham host the podcast. The production team includes Pineapple Street's Jenna Weiss-Berman, Neena Pathak, Sasha Weiss, Wendy Dorr, and members of the Times audio department, Lisa Tobin and Samantha Henig.

== Format ==
The format typically includes discussion between Morris and Wortham as well as one or more interviews, sometimes in studio but often in outside locations: the first episode ("First Date") followed Wortham and Morris on a walk through Central Park. They have also visited the National Museum of African American History and Culture (NMAAHC), interviewing curator Joanne Hyppolite, among other places. Laura Jane Standley and Eric McQuade of The Atlantic described the show as "at base, a set of discussions about the big cultural events of the day. But Still Processing is sharp and intellectual, goofy and raw: The two hosts talk to each other and to guests (including RuPaul) about anyone from Colin Kaepernick to Kerry James Marshall; about society and art; about dating and work."

Episodes are usually between half an hour and an hour in length.

== Reception ==
Reviewing the podcast's launch, Tim Barnes at The A.V. Club said the "inaugural episode of The New York Times' Still Processing podcast is an incredible mix of personality, pop culture, and education. Writers Jenna Wortham and Wesley Morris bring a jolt of energy to the show, which feels like old media finally embracing the new." Of the first episode, Taylor Bryant said at Nylon that Wortham and Morris's "natural banter and strong viewpoints will leave you wanting so, so much more."

The Atlantic named Still Processing among the 50 best podcasts of 2016, citing the November 10, 2016 post-election episode "The Reckoning" as a "banner episode". The Huffington Post likewise cited the post-election episode in naming Still Processing to its list of 15 notable podcasts of 2016. IndieWire named the "Journey to the 'Blacksonian'" episode, about Wortham and Morris's trip to the National Museum of African American History and Culture, to its list of 2016 50 best podcast episodes.

=== Awards ===
Award	Date	Category	Result	Ref.
Webby Awards	2017	Arts & Culture	Won	
Webby Awards	2019	Arts & Culture	Won	
Webby Awards	2019	People's Voice Winner	Won	
Shorty Awards	2019	Podcast	Nominated	
iHeart Radio Podcast Awards	2021	Pop culture	Nominated	
iHeart Radio Podcast Awards	2022	Pop culture	Nominated	

== See also ==
- List of LGBT podcasts
