= 9/12 (podcast) =

2021 podcast by Dan Taberski

- Genre: history podcast, society and culture podcast

Cast and voices
- Hosted by: Dan Taberski

Publication
- No. of episodes: 11

Reception
- Ratings: 3.7/5

Related
- Preceded by: The Line
- Website: https://amazon.com/ninetwelve

9/12 is a podcast hosted by Dan Taberski and produced by Pineapple Street Media, Wondery, and Amazon Music.

== Background ==
The podcast explores seven different people's post-9/11 stories. The show is produced on the 20th anniversary of 9/11. The first episode explores the story of 56 people who participated in a reality TV show that involved living on a boat out at sea. The second episode discusses how the September 11 attacks affected comedy—specifically George Carlin and The Onion. The third episode discusses a Pakistani man and how the events of September 11 affected American Muslims. Episode number four discusses 9/11 conspiracy theories. Daniel Herskedal composed the music for the show.

== Reception ==
Reggie Ugwu wrote in The New York Times that the podcast was "a striking listening experience." Sarah Larson wrote in The New Yorker that the host's delivery has "conversational patness" but that the overall effect is "utterly terrific." Eliana Dockterman wrote in Time Magazine that the podcast was Taberski's "best show yet." Vince Mancini wrote in Uproxx that the Taberski's podcasts have had "ups and downs" but that this podcast is "his best yet." The show won podcast of the year at the 2022 Ambies Awards. The show was also included on lists of the best podcasts of 2021 published by Financial Times, The Week, Mashable, CBC Radio, and Esquire.
