= Wind of Change (Scorpions song) =

1991 single by Scorpions

- Artwork used for most European releases

Single by Scorpions

from the album Crazy World
- B-side: "Restless Nights"
- Released: 21 January 1991
- Studio: Wisseloord (Hilversum, Netherlands); Goodnight LA (Los Angeles)
- Genre: Hard rock; soft rock
- Length: 5:13 (album version); 4:33 (video single version); 3:44 (radio edit)
- Label: Mercury; Vertigo
- Songwriter: Klaus Meine
- Producers: Keith Olsen; Scorpions

Scorpions singles chronology
"Don't Believe Her" (1990)	"Wind of Change" (1991)	"Send Me an Angel" (1991)

Music video
- "Wind of Change" on YouTube

"Wind of Change" is a song by German rock band Scorpions, recorded for their 11th studio album, Crazy World (1990). A power ballad, it was composed and written by the band's lead singer, Klaus Meine, and produced by Keith Olsen and the band. The lyrics were composed by Meine following the band's visit to the Soviet Union at the height of perestroika, when the enmity between the communist and capitalist blocs subsided concurrently with the start of large-scale socioeconomic reforms in the Soviet Union.

"Wind of Change" was released as the album's third single on 21 January 1991 by Mercury and Vertigo Records. The song became a worldwide hit, just after the failed coup that would eventually lead to the end of the Soviet Union. The song topped the charts in Germany and six other countries across Europe, and it also peaked at number four in the United States, number seven in Australia and number two in the United Kingdom. It later appeared on the band's 1995 live album Live Bites, their 2000 album with the Berlin Philharmonic Orchestra, Moment of Glory, and on their 2001 "unplugged" album Acoustica. The band also recorded a Russian-language version of the song, under the title "Ветер перемен" ("Veter Peremen") and a Spanish version called "Viento de Cambio”.

With estimated sales of 14 million copies sold worldwide, "Wind of Change" is one of the best-selling singles of all time. It holds the record for the best-selling single by a German artist. The band presented a gold record and $70,000 of royalties from the single to Mikhail Gorbachev in 1991, with Soviet news sources reporting the money would be allocated to children's hospitals.

== Background and writing ==
Klaus Meine said in an interview that the time 1988/1989 in the Soviet Union was characterized by the mood that the Cold War was coming to an end, the music was the unifying factor for the people. The memories of this time are also transported in the music video for the song. Meine was inspired by his participation in the Moscow Music Peace Festival on 13 August 1989, at Lenin Stadium, where the Scorpions performed in front of about 300,000 fans:

Die Idee dazu ist mir in der U.d.S.S.R. gekommen, als ich in einer Sommernacht im Gorki Park Center saß und auf die Moskwa geblickt habe. Das Lied ist meine persönliche Aufarbeitung dessen, was in den letzten Jahren in der Welt passiert ist.

The idea came to me in the U.S.S.R. when I was sitting in the Gorky Park Center one summer night, looking at the Moskva River. The song is my personal reappraisal of what has happened in the world in recent years.

— Klaus Meine, Friede, Freude, Hasch und Perestroika, in: Rocks. Das Magazin für Classic Rock, Heft 01.2014, S. 88

Meine referred to the 'SNC' cultural center, opened by Stas Namin inside Moscow's Gorky Park without any official permission, where Russian and international musicians as well as progressive poets, artists and designers met in a free, innovative atmosphere. The lyrics celebrate glasnost in the Soviet Union, the end of the Cold War, and speak of hope at a time when tense conditions had arisen due to the fall of Communist-run governments among Eastern Bloc nations beginning in 1989. The opening lines refer to the city of Moscow's landmarks:

I follow the Moskva
Down to Gorky Park
Listening to the wind of change

The Moskva is the name of the river that runs through Moscow (both the city and the river are named identically in Russian), and Gorky Park is an urban park in Moscow named after the writer Maxim Gorky. The song further mentions the balalaika, the signature Russian stringed instrument, as a counterpart to the guitar, suggesting harmony of different cultures. The balalaika is mentioned in the following lines:

Let your balalaika sing
What my guitar wants to say

Klaus Meine and Rudolf Schenker are owners of the trade mark Wind of Change.

== Composition ==
"Wind of Change" opens with a clean guitar introduction played by Matthias Jabs, which is played alongside Klaus Meine's flat whistle. The guitar solo is played by Rudolf Schenker.

== Legacy ==
The song became associated with the Revolutions of 1989 and the Fall of the Berlin Wall also in 1989 and was performed by the Scorpions at the Brandenburg Gate on 9 November 1999, during the 10th anniversary of the Fall of the Berlin Wall. In 2005, viewers of the German television network ZDF chose this song as the song of the century.

"Wind of Change" is featured in the films In Search of a Midnight Kiss (2007), Gentlemen Broncos (2009), The Interview (2014), Love Island (2014), I.S.S. (2024), and Project Hail Mary (2026) and the video game SingStar Rocks! (2006). The song can be heard in the opening scene of the action comedy film The Spy Who Dumped Me (2018). The song is also featured in television shows Melrose Place, Brass Eye, Chuck, and Peter Kay’s Car Share and Nutri Ventures parody version.

As of 2022, the Scorpions still perform the song live but with lyrical changes in light of the 2022 Russian invasion of Ukraine. The opening lines are changed to "Now listen to my heart / It says Ukrainia, waiting for the wind to change." Meine stated, "It's not the time with this terrible war in Ukraine raging on, it's not the time to romanticize Russia."

In February 2023, the official music video hit one billion views on YouTube. During the COVID-19 pandemic, the Scorpions collaborated with Japanese rock star Yoshiki to perform "Wind of Change" for the documentary film Yoshiki: Under the Sky. This was the first time the band came together to perform the Ukraine version of the song. The performance was later released as a music video on YouTube.

As of 2024, the Scorpions have changed the opening lyrics again to adopt a more neutral tone, displaying these on the video screens at gigs: "Now listen to my heart, it still believes in love, waiting for the wind to change. A dark and lonely night, our dreams will never die, waiting for the wind to change." In November 2025, "Wind of Change" hit one billion streams on Spotify.

== Claim of CIA involvement ==
"Wind of Change" is the subject of the Pineapple Street Studios podcast Wind of Change, released 11 May 2020. Patrick Radden Keefe, a staff writer at the New Yorker and host of the podcast, investigated the allegation that it was written by or connected to the Central Intelligence Agency, citing a rumor originating allegedly from inside the agency. In a SiriusXM interview with Eddie Trunk on 13 May 2020, Meine stated "It's a fascinating idea, and it's an entertaining idea, but it's not true at all". In December 2020, it was reported that a further investigation would be adapted into a series for Hulu directed by Alex Karpovsky. Keefe stated several times in the podcast that his ultimate inability to prove nor disprove the claim occupied his time and energy for years, and by the end, he wondered if creating the podcast meant he was actually unintentionally creating propaganda for the CIA.

== Track listings ==
- European 7-inch single and Japanese mini-CD single
1. "Wind of Change" – 5:10
2. "Restless Nights" – 5:44
- European maxi-CD single
1. "Wind of Change" – 5:10
2. "Restless Nights" – 5:44
3. "Big City Nights" (live) – 5:10
- UK CD single
1. "Wind of Change"
2. "To Be with You in Heaven"
3. "Blackout" (live)
- US and Canadian 7-inch single

A. "Wind of Change" – 5:10
B. "Money and Fame" – 5:06

== Personnel ==
Scorpions

- Klaus Meine – lead vocals
- Rudolf Schenker – lead guitar, background vocals
- Matthias Jabs – rhythm guitar, background vocals
- Francis Buchholz – bass
- Herman Rarebell – drums

Additional personnel

- Koen van Baal – keyboards
- Russell Powell – guitar

== Charts ==
=== Weekly charts ===
Chart (1991–1992)	Peak position
Australia (ARIA)	7
Austria (Ö3 Austria Top 40)	1
Belgium (Ultratop 50 Flanders)	2
Canada Top Singles (RPM)	10
Denmark (IFPI)	2
Europe (Eurochart Hot 100)	1
Europe (European Hit Radio)	23
Finland (Suomen virallinen lista)	5
France (SNEP)	1
Germany (GfK)	1
Ireland (IRMA)	2
Luxembourg (Radio Luxembourg)	1
Netherlands (Dutch Top 40)	1
Netherlands (Single Top 100)	1
New Zealand (Recorded Music NZ)	17
Norway (VG-lista)	1
Sweden (Sverigetopplistan)	1
Switzerland (Schweizer Hitparade)	1
UK Singles (Official Charts)	2
UK Airplay (Music Week)	1
US Billboard Hot 100	4
US Adult Contemporary (Billboard)	43
US Mainstream Rock Airplay (Billboard)	2
US Cash Box Top 100	6

Chart (2026)	Peak position
Poland Airplay (OLiS)	94

=== Year-end charts ===
Chart (1991)	Position
Australia (ARIA)	43
Austria (Ö3 Austria Top 40)	1
Belgium (Ultratop 50 Flanders)	2
Canada Top Singles (RPM)	94
Europe (Eurochart Hot 100)	2
Germany (Media Control)	1
Netherlands (Dutch Top 40)	8
Netherlands (Single Top 100)	8
Sweden (Topplistan)	2
Switzerland (Schweizer Hitparade)	1
UK Singles (OCC)	21
US Billboard Hot 100	39
US Album Rock Tracks (Billboard)	2

Chart (2024)	Position
Kazakhstan Airplay (TopHit)	170

=== Decade-end charts ===
Chart (1990–1999)	Rank
Austria (Ö3 Austria Top 40)	4

== Certifications and sales ==
Region	Certification	Certified units/sales
Australia (ARIA)	Gold	35,000^{^}
Austria (IFPI Austria)	Platinum	50,000^{*}
Brazil (Pro-Música Brasil)	Gold	30,000^{‡}
Denmark (IFPI Danmark)	Platinum	90,000^{‡}
France (SNEP)	Gold	400,000^{*}
Germany (BVMI)	Platinum	500,000^{^}
Italy (FIMI) sales since 2009	Platinum	70,000^{‡}
New Zealand (RMNZ)	Platinum	30,000^{‡}
Russia (NFPF) Ringtone	Gold	100,000^{*}
Spain (Promusicae)	Platinum	60,000^{‡}
United Kingdom (BPI)	Gold	400,000^{‡}
United States (RIAA)	Gold	500,000^{^}
^{*} Sales figures based on certification alone.^{^} Shipments figures based on certification alone.^{‡} Sales+streaming figures based on certification alone.

== Release history ==
Region	Date	Format(s)	Label(s)	Ref.
Europe	21 January 1991	7-inch vinyl; CD	Mercury	
United Kingdom	20 May 1991	7-inch vinyl; 12-inch vinyl; CD	Vertigo	
United Kingdom	24 June 1991	Cassette	Vertigo	
Australia	15 July 1991	CD; cassette	Mercury	
United Kingdom (re-release)	16 September 1991	7-inch vinyl; 12-inch vinyl; CD; cassette	Vertigo	
Japan	25 October 1991	Mini-CD	Mercury	

== See also ==
- Glasnost
- Perestroika
- Demokratizatsiya (Soviet Union)
