= Heaven's Gate (religious group) =

American UFO religion (1974–1997)

- Type: New religious movement
- Classification: UFO religion
- Orientation: Christian millenarianism, New Age, Ufology
- Scripture: Bible
- Leaders: Bonnie Nettles (1974–1985); Marshall Applewhite (1974–1997)
- Region: United States
- Headquarters: Manzano, New Mexico (1995–1996); Rancho Santa Fe, California (1996–1997)
- Founder: Marshall Applewhite and Bonnie Nettles
- Origin: 1974
- Members: 39 (pre-1997)
- Other names: Human Individual Metamorphosis, Total Overcomers Anonymous
- Official website: www.heavensgate.com

Heaven's Gate was an American new religious movement primarily known for the mass suicide of its members in 1997. Often described as a cult, it was founded in 1974 and led by Marshall Applewhite (1931–1997) and Bonnie Nettles (1927–1985), known within the movement as Do and Ti, respectively. Nettles and Applewhite first met in 1972 and went on a journey of spiritual discovery, identifying themselves as the two witnesses of the Book of Revelation, attracting a following of several hundred people in the mid-1970s. In 1976, a core group of a few dozen members stopped recruiting and instituted a monastic lifestyle.

Scholars have described the theology of Heaven's Gate as a mixture of Christian millenarianism, New Age, and ufology, and it has been characterized as a UFO religion. The central belief of the group was that followers could transform themselves into immortal extraterrestrial beings by rejecting their human nature, and they would ascend to heaven, referred to as the "Next Level" or "The Evolutionary Level Above Human". The death of Nettles from cancer in 1985 challenged the group's views on ascension; while they originally believed that they would ascend to heaven while alive aboard a UFO, they came to believe that the body was merely a "container" or "vehicle" for the soul and that their consciousness would be transferred to "Next Level bodies" upon death.

On March 26, 1997, deputies of the San Diego County Sheriff's Department discovered the bodies of the 39 active members of the group, including Applewhite, in a house in the San Diego County suburb of Rancho Santa Fe. They had participated in a coordinated series of ritual suicides, coinciding with the closest approach of Comet Hale–Bopp. Just before the mass suicide, the group's website was updated with the message: "Hale–Bopp brings closure to Heaven's Gate ... our 22 years of classroom here on planet Earth is finally coming to conclusion – 'graduation' from the Human Evolutionary Level. We are happily prepared to leave 'this world' and go with Ti's crew."

== History ==
The son of a Presbyterian minister and a former soldier, Marshall Applewhite began his foray into Biblical prophecy in the early 1970s. In March 1972, he met Bonnie Nettles, a 44-year-old married nurse with an interest in Theosophy and Biblical prophecy. The circumstances of their meeting are unclear. According to Applewhite's writings, the two met in a hospital where she worked as a nurse while he was visiting a sick friend. Applewhite had recently been dismissed from his role as music director at the University of St. Thomas in Houston, Texas, over an alleged relationship with one of his male students, and his wife had previously left him due to his multiple homosexual relationships. These personal and professional setbacks left him feeling depressed. James Lewis suggests that Applewhite was a patient in the facility. Applewhite claimed, however, that he was only visiting the hospital where Nettles worked as a nurse, not receiving treatment himself. Nettles wrote an astrology column for a Houston newspaper, drawing on insights from "Brother Francis", a 19th-century Franciscan friar she believed she was channeling. She was also involved with the Theosophical Society and participated in weekly séances with her local group in Houston. At the time she met Applewhite, her own marriage was falling apart. Applewhite later recalled that he felt that he had known Nettles for a long time and concluded that they had met in a past life. She told him their meeting had been foretold to her by extraterrestrials, persuading him that he had a divine assignment.

Applewhite and Nettles pondered the life of St. Francis of Assisi and read works by Helena Blavatsky, R. D. Laing, and Richard Bach. They kept a King James Bible and studied passages from the New Testament focusing on Christology, asceticism, and eschatology. Applewhite also read science fiction, including works by Robert A. Heinlein and Arthur C. Clarke. By June 19, Applewhite and Nettles's beliefs had solidified. They concluded that they had been chosen to fulfill biblical prophecies and been given higher-level minds than other people. They wrote a pamphlet that described Jesus's reincarnation as a Texan, a veiled reference to Applewhite. Furthermore, they concluded that they were the two witnesses described in the Book of Revelation, and occasionally visited churches and spiritual groups to speak of their identities, often referring to themselves as "The Two", or "The UFO Two". They believed they would be killed and then resurrected and, in view of others, transported onto a spaceship. This event, which they referred to as "the Demonstration", was to prove their claims. These ideas were poorly received by other religious groups.

The Two would gain their first follower in May 1974: Sharon Morgan, who abandoned her children to join them. A month later, Morgan left The Two and returned to her family. Nettles and Applewhite were arrested and charged with credit card fraud for using Morgan's cards, although she had consented to their use. The charges were dropped. A routine check revealed that Applewhite had stolen a rental car from St. Louis nine months earlier, which he still possessed. Applewhite spent six months in jail, primarily in Missouri, and was released in early 1975, rejoining Nettles.

Eventually, Applewhite and Nettles resolved to contact extraterrestrials and seek like-minded followers. They published advertisements for meetings, where they recruited disciples, called "the crew". At the events, they purported to represent beings from another planet, the Next Level, who sought participants for an experiment. They said those who agreed to participate in the experiment would be brought to a higher evolutionary level. In April 1975, during a meeting with a group of 80 people in Studio City, Los Angeles, they shared their "simultaneous" revelation that they were the two witnesses in the Bible's story of the end time. According to Benjamin Zeller, while accounts of the meeting differ, all describe it as momentous and agree that Applewhite and Nettles presented themselves as charismatic leaders with an important spiritual message. About 25 individuals joined the group.

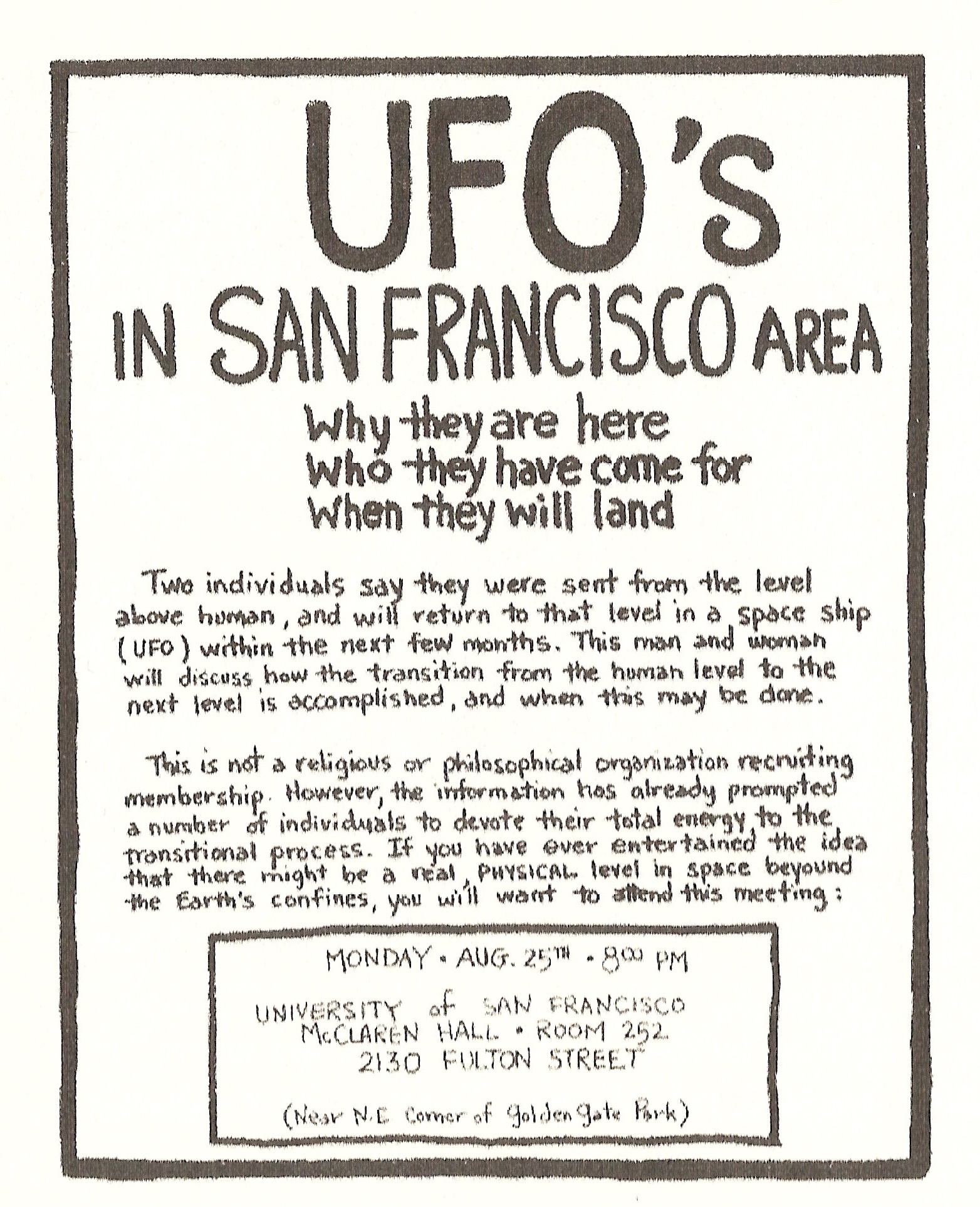
A recruitment flyer posted in San Francisco in August 1975

In September 1975, Applewhite and Nettles preached at a motel hall in Waldport, Oregon. After selling all "worldly" possessions and saying farewell to loved ones, around 20 people vanished from the public eye and joined the group. Later that year, on CBS Evening News, Walter Cronkite reported on the disappearances in one of the first national reports on the developing religious group: "A score of persons from a small Oregon town have disappeared. It's a mystery whether they've been taken on a so-called trip to eternity – or simply been taken." In reality, Applewhite and Nettles had arranged for the group to go underground. From that point, "Do" and "Ti" (pronounced "doe" and "tee"), as the two now called themselves, led nearly one hundred members across the country, sleeping in tents and sleeping bags and begging in the streets. Evading detection by the authorities and media enabled the group to focus on Do and Ti's doctrine of helping members of the crew achieve a "higher evolutionary level" above human, which the leaders claimed to have already reached.

Applewhite and Nettles used a variety of aliases over the years, notably "Bo and Peep" and "Do and Ti". The group also had several names prior to the adoption of the name Heaven's Gate. At the time Jacques Vallée studied the group, it was known as Human Individual Metamorphosis (HIM). The group re-invented and renamed itself several times. Applewhite believed he was directly related to Jesus, meaning he was an "Evolutionary Kingdom Level Above Human". His writings, which combined aspects of Millennialism, Gnosticism, and science fiction, suggest he believed himself to be Jesus's successor and the "Present Representative" of Christ on Earth. Do and Ti taught early on that Do's bodily "vehicle" was inhabited by the same alien spirit that belonged to Jesus; Ti was presented as God the Father, Do's "older member".

The crew used various recruitment methods as they toured the United States in destitution, proclaiming the gospel of higher-level metamorphosis, the deceit of humans by "false-God spirits", envelopment with sunlight for meditative healing, and the divinity of the "UFO Two". In April 1976, the group stopped recruiting and became reclusive, and instituted a rigid set of behavioral guidelines, including banning sexual activity and the use of drugs. Applewhite and Nettles solidified their temporal and religious authority over the group. Benjamin Zeller described the movement as having transformed "from a loosely organized social group to a centralized religious movement comparable to a roving monastery".

Some sociologists agree that the popular movement of alternative religious experience and individualism found in collective spiritual experiences during that period helped contribute to the growth of Heaven's Gate. Sheilaism, as it became known, was a way for people to merge their diverse religious backgrounds and coalesce around a shared, generalized faith, which followers of new religious sects like Applewhite's crew found to be an appetizing alternative to traditional dogmas in Judaism, Catholicism and evangelical Christianity. Many of Applewhite and Nettles's crew hailed from these diverse backgrounds; most of them are described by researchers as having been "longtime truth-seekers" or spiritual hippies who had long since believed in attempting to "find themselves" through spiritual means, combining faiths in a sort of cultural environment well into the mid-1980s. Not all of Applewhite's crew were hippies recruited from alternative religious backgrounds – one such recruit early on was John Craig, a respected Republican and ranch owner who came close to winning a 1970 Colorado House of Representatives race. He joined the group in 1975.

Identifying itself by the business name "Higher Source", the group used its website to proselytize and recruit followers beginning in the early 1990s. Rumors started spreading among the group in the following years that the upcoming Comet Hale–Bopp housed the secret to their ultimate salvation and ascent into the kingdom of heaven.

=== Contemporary media coverage ===
Heaven's Gate received coverage in Jacques Vallée's book Messengers of Deception (1979), in which Vallée described an unusual public meeting organized by the group. He expressed concerns about contactee groups' authoritarian political and religious outlooks, and Heaven's Gate did not escape criticism. Known to the media (though largely ignored), Heaven's Gate was better known in UFO circles, and through a series of academic studies by sociologist Robert Balch.

In January 1994, LA Weekly ran an article on the group, then known as "The Total Overcomers". Richard Ford, who would play a key role in the 1997 group suicide, discovered Heaven's Gate through this article and eventually joined them, renaming himself Rio DiAngelo. Coast to Coast AM host Art Bell discussed the theory of the "companion object" in the shadow of Hale–Bopp on several programs as early as November 1996. Speculation has been raised as to whether Bell's programs contributed to Heaven's Gate's group suicide. Knowledge Fight host Dan Friesen places more blame on Courtney Brown than on Bell.

Louis Theroux contacted Heaven's Gate for his BBC2 documentary series, Louis Theroux's Weird Weekends, in early March 1997, weeks before their mass suicide. In response to his e-mail, Theroux was told that Heaven's Gate could not participate in the documentary: "at the present time a project like this would be an interference with what we must focus on."

=== Mass suicide ===
In October 1996, the group rented a large house which they called "The Monastery", a 9,200-square-foot (850 m^{2}) mansion located near 18341 Colina Norte (later renamed to Paseo Victoria) in Rancho Santa Fe, California. They paid the $7,000 per month rent in cash (equivalent to $14,000 in 2025). The same month, the group purchased "alien abduction insurance" that would cover up to fifty members and would pay out $1 million per person (the policy covered abduction, impregnation, or death by aliens). In June 1995, they had purchased land near Manzano, New Mexico, and began creating a compound out of rubber tires and concrete, but had left abruptly in April 1996.

On March 13, 1997, media reported on a mass sighting of unidentified lights over Phoenix. During March 19–20, Marshall Applewhite taped himself in a video titled Do's Final Exit, speaking of mass suicide and "the only way to evacuate this Earth". After asserting that Comet Hale–Bopp was the sign that the group had been looking for, as well as the speculation that an unidentified flying object (UFO) was trailing the comet, Applewhite and his 38 followers prepared for ritual suicide, coinciding with the closest approach of the comet, ostensibly so their souls could reach the Next Level before the closure of "Heaven's Gate". Members believed that after their deaths a UFO would take their souls to another "level of existence above human", which was described as being both physical and spiritual. Their preparations included most members videotaping a farewell message. The 39 adherents—21 women and 18 men between the ages of 26 and 72—are believed to have died in three groups over three successive days, with the remaining participants cleaning up after the prior group's deaths.

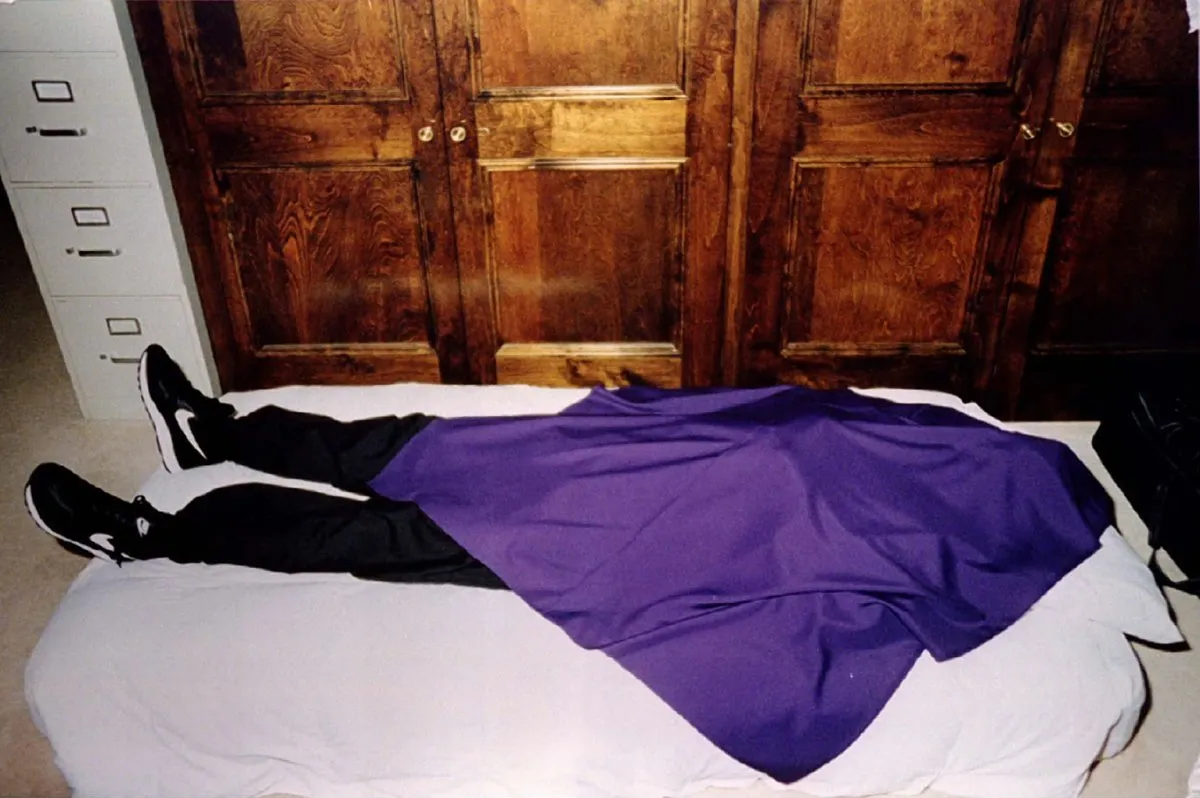
All members were discovered wearing black clothing and Nike Decades athletic shoes, with purple shrouds placed over their bodies.

The suicides began on March 22–23 in three waves. (Note: Some news reports give different dates, with some stating that all three groups committed suicide on March 22, that the groups committed suicide on March 22–24, or on March 24–26. Autopsies determined that the deaths began on 22 or 23 of March.) Members took lethal doses of the sedative drug phenobarbital mixed into apple sauce or pudding. They also consumed vodka, which can cause fatal overdose when combined with barbiturates. Afterwards, they secured plastic bags around their heads to induce asphyxiation. All 39 were dressed in identical black shirts and sweatpants, brand-new black-and-white Nike Decades athletic shoes, and armband patches reading "Heaven's Gate Away Team" (one of many instances of the group's use of Star Trek terms). Each member carried a five-dollar bill and three quarters in their pockets. According to former members, this was standard for members leaving the home for jobs and "a humorous way to tell us they all had left the planet permanently"; the five-dollar bill was for covering the cost of vagrancy laws and the quarters were for calling home from pay phones. Another former member stated that it was a reference to a Mark Twain story, which said $5.75 was "the cost to ride the tail of a comet to heaven". No such passage from the writings of Twain is known to exist.

After a member died, a living member would arrange the body by removing the plastic bag from the person's head, followed by posing the body so that it lay neatly in its own bed, with faces and torsos covered by a square purple cloth, for privacy. In a 2020 interview with Harry Robinson, two members who were not in Rancho Santa Fe when the suicides happened said that the identical clothing was a uniform representing unity for the mass suicide, while the Nike Decades were chosen because the group "got a good deal on the shoes". Applewhite was also a fan of Nikes "and therefore everyone was expected to wear and like Nikes" within the group. Heaven's Gate had a saying "Just Do it", echoing Nike's slogan, but pronouncing "Do" as "Doe", to reflect Applewhite's nickname.

Among the dead was Thomas Nichols, brother of the actress Nichelle Nichols, best known for her role as Uhura in the original television series of Star Trek. Applewhite was the third to last member to die; two people remained after him, and were the only ones found with bags over their heads and not having purple cloths covering their top halves. Before the last of the suicides, similar sets of packages were sent to numerous individuals affiliated (or formerly affiliated) with Heaven's Gate.

Video footage of the residence recorded by the San Diego Sheriff's Department

Among those on the list of recipients was Rio DiAngelo. The package DiAngelo received on the evening of March 25 contained—like other packages that were sent out—two VHS videotapes: one with Do's Final Exit, and the other with the "farewell messages" of group followers. It also contained a letter stating that, among other things, "we have exited our vehicles just as we entered them". DiAngelo informed his boss, Nick Matzorkis, president of InterAct Entertainment Group, of the contents of the packages, and received a ride from him from Los Angeles to the Heaven's Gate home so he could verify the letter. DiAngelo found a back door intentionally left unlocked, and used a video camera to record what he saw. After leaving the house, Matzorkis, who had waited outside, encouraged him to make calls alerting the authorities. Referring to DiAngelo, Matzorkis said in a later interview, “He looked as white as a sheet. He said, ‘They did it. They committed suicide.'”

The San Diego County Sheriff's Department received an anonymous tip through 911 at 3:15 p.m. on March 26, suggesting they "check on the welfare of the residents". Days after the suicides, the caller was revealed to be DiAngelo.

Caller: Yes, I need to report an anonymous tip, who do I talk to?

Sheriff's Department: Okay, this is regarding what?

Caller: This is regarding a mass suicide, and I can give you the address [...]

— San Diego County 911 call, March 26, 1997, 3:15 p.m. PST

The lone deputy who first responded to the call entered the home through a side door, saw ten bodies, and was nearly overcome by a "pungent odor", as the bodies had already begun decomposing in the hot Southern California spring. After a cursory search by two more deputies found no one alive, they retreated until a search warrant could be procured.

Photographs of the scene taken by the San Diego Sheriff's Department
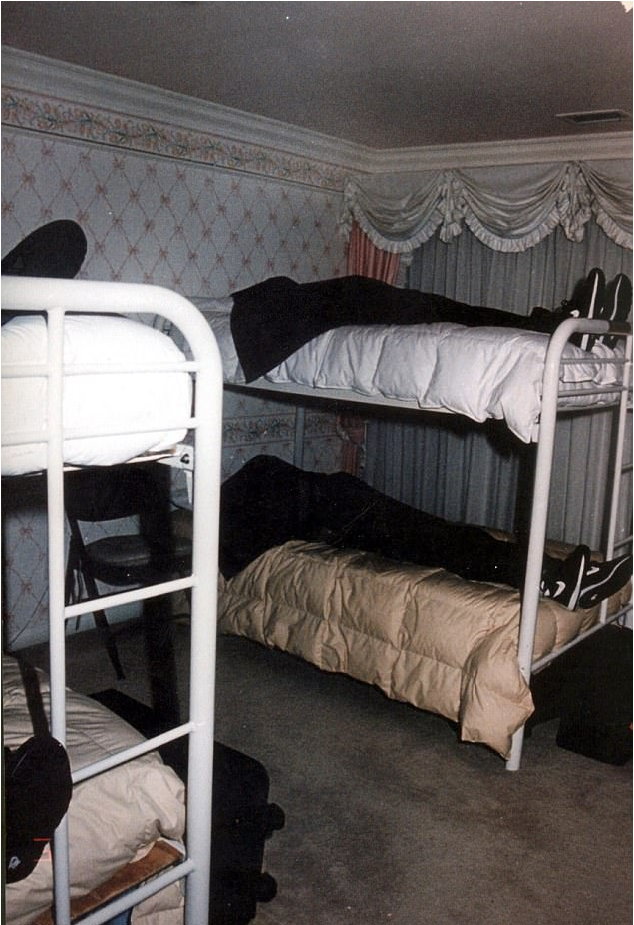

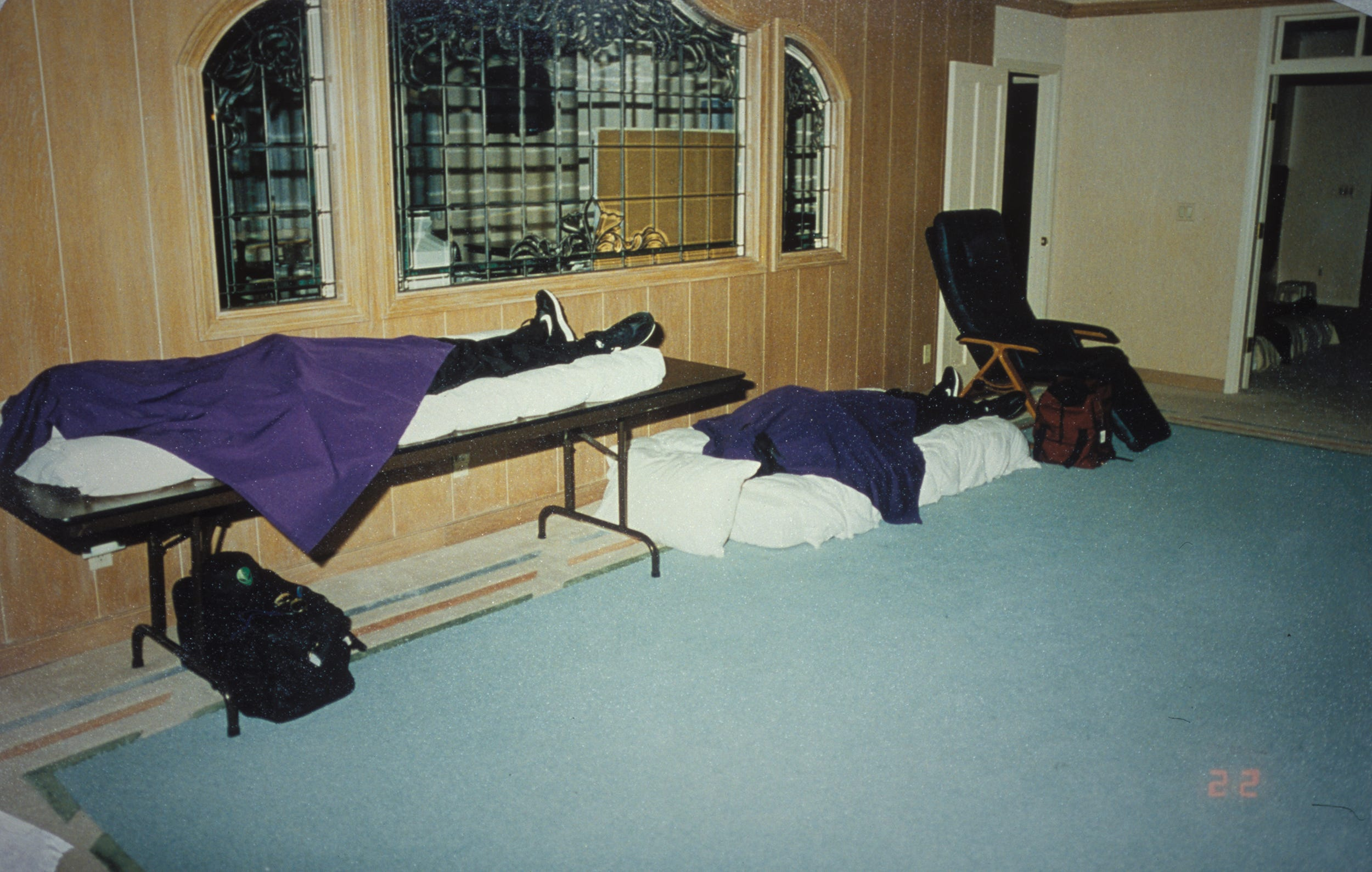

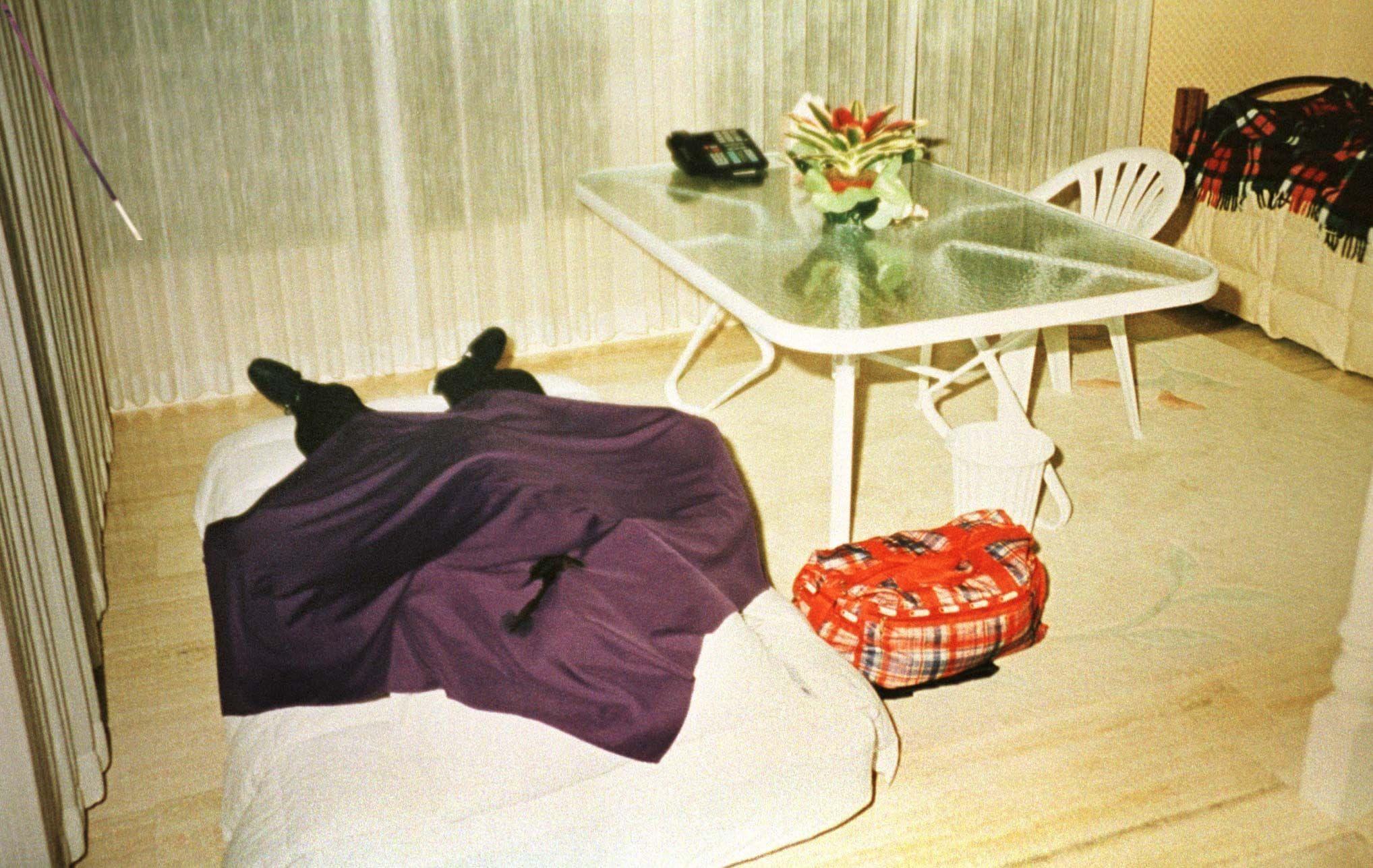

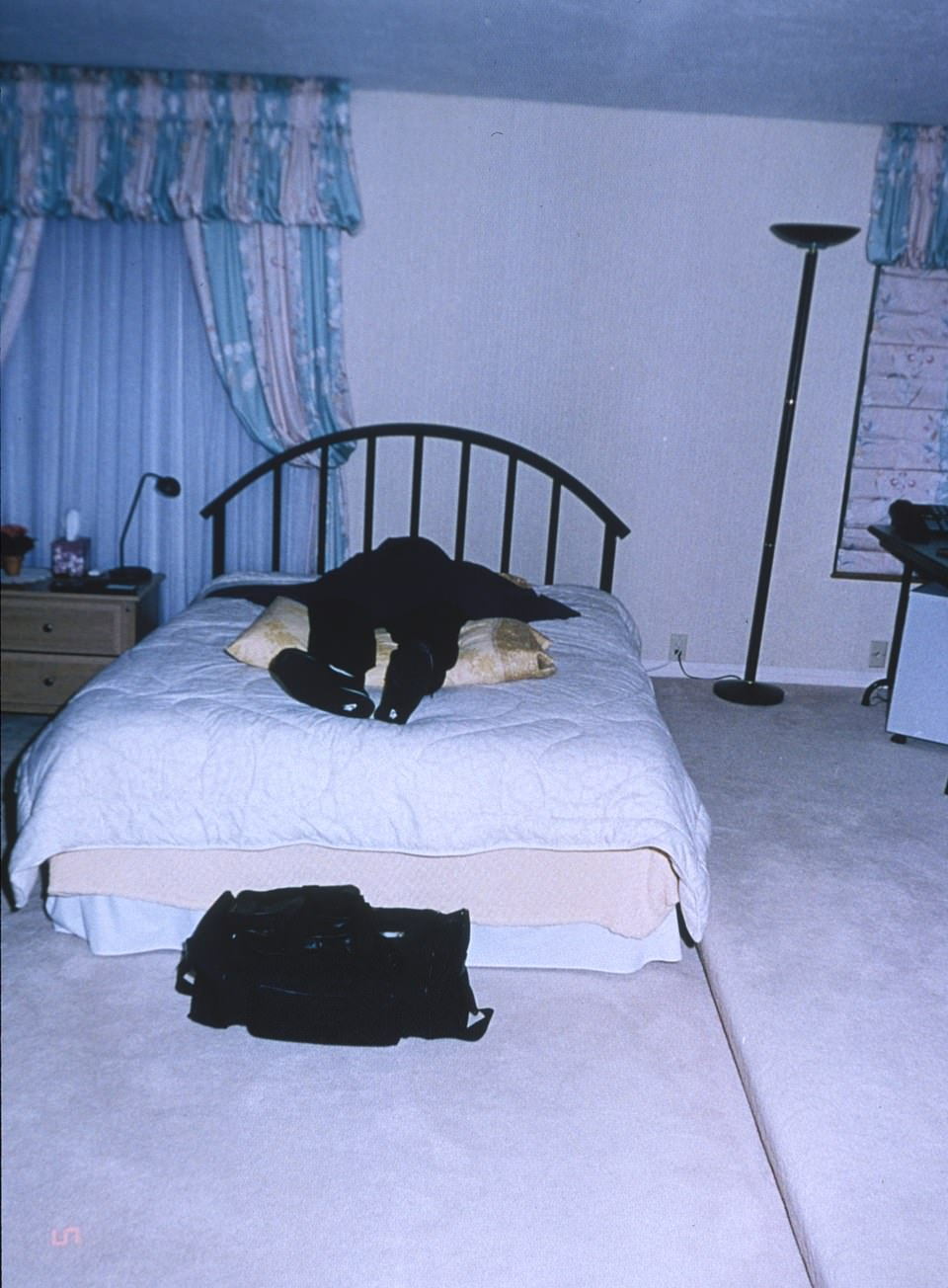

=== Aftermath ===
The Heaven's Gate deaths were widely publicized in the media as an example of mass suicide. When the news broke of its relation to Comet Hale–Bopp, the co-discoverer of the comet, Alan Hale, was drawn into the story. Hale's phone "never stopped ringing the entire day". He chose not to respond until the next day at a press conference after researching the details of the incident. Speaking at the Second World Skeptics Congress in Heidelberg, Germany, on July 24, 1998:

Dr. Hale discussed the scientific significance and popular lore of comets and gave a personal account of his discovery. He then lambasted the combination of scientific illiteracy, willful delusions, a radio talk show's deception about an imaginary spacecraft following the comet, and a cult's bizarre yearnings for ascending to another level of existence that led to the Heaven's Gate mass suicides.

Hale said that well before Heaven's Gate, he had told a colleague:

"We are probably going to have some suicides as a result of this comet." The sad part is that I was really not surprised. Comets are lovely objects, but they don't have apocalyptic significance. We must use our minds, our reason.

News of the mass suicide motivated the copycat suicide of a 58-year-old man living near Marysville, California. The man left a note dated March 27, which said "I'm going on the spaceship with Hale–Bopp to be with those who have gone before me", and imitated some of the details of the Heaven's Gate suicides as they had then been reported. The man was found dead by a friend on March 31 and had no known connection with Heaven's Gate.

At least three former members of Heaven's Gate died by suicide in the months following the mass suicide. On May 6, 1997, Wayne Cooke and Chuck Humphrey (known as "Rkkody" within the group) attempted suicide in a hotel in a manner similar to that used by the group. Cooke died, but Humphrey survived and was saved by authorities. Another former member, James Pirkey Jr., died by suicide by a self-inflicted gunshot wound on May 11. In February 1998, Humphrey killed himself in Arizona. His body was found carrying a five-dollar bill and four quarters in his pocket; next to him was a note that read: "Do not revive".

On March 22, the same day as the Heaven's Gate suicide, five members of the Order of the Solar Temple group also died in a mass suicide. The Solar Temple happened to be a group with similar beliefs, in both cases believing that suicide would allow their souls to be transported into space. This led to initial suspicions of a connection, though police investigating the Heaven's Gate deaths refused to acknowledge these speculations. The Solar Temple suicides had been timed for the vernal equinox on March 20, not the comet, but owing to several failed attempts it happened only on the 22nd. There was no apparent connection between the two groups.

Although most people considered the event a mass suicide, sociologist and former cult member Janja Lalich referred to the event as "murder". UCLA psychiatrist Louis J. West described the dead members as "victims of a hoax [...] There was villainy here."

Two former members, Marc and Sarah King of Phoenix, Arizona, operating as the TELAH Foundation, are believed to maintain the group's website.

The house at which the mass suicide took place carried a stigma throughout the neighborhood. Local residents opted to rename the street on which it was located to "Paseo Victoria". The property itself ended up being purchased by a local developer in 1999 for $668,000 during a foreclosure sale, well below half its assessed value of $1.4 million. It was subsequently purchased by neighbors who razed the building, built a new house in its place, and changed the address to 18239.

== Belief system ==
Scholars disagree over whether the theology of Heaven's Gate is fundamentally either New Age or Christian in nature. Benjamin Zeller has argued that the theology of Heaven's Gate was primarily rooted in Evangelicalism but it also had New Age elements. Scholars have described the theology of Heaven's Gate as a mixture of Christian millenarianism, New Age, and ufology, and as such it has been mainly characterized as a UFO religion.

The group adopted the ancient astronaut hypothesis, which was prominent at the time of the group's formation due to the then-recent publication of works like Erich von Däniken's Chariots of the Gods?. The term "ancient astronauts" is used to refer to various forms of the concept that extraterrestrials visited Earth in the distant past. Applewhite and Nettles took part of this concept and taught it as the belief that "aliens planted the seeds of current humanity millions of years ago, and have to come to reap the harvest of their work in the form of spiritually evolved individuals who will join the ranks of flying saucer crews. Only a select few members of humanity will be chosen to advance to this transhuman state. The rest will be left to wallow in the spiritually poisoned atmosphere of a corrupt world." Only individuals who joined Heaven's Gate, followed Applewhite and Nettles's belief system, and made the sacrifices required for membership would be allowed to escape human suffering.

Paralleling the beliefs of ancient astronaut theorists like Däniken, Heaven's Gate interpreted the Bible as recording events of extraterrestrial contact.

Initially, recruits had been told that they would be biologically and chemically transformed into extraterrestrial beings and would be transported aboard a spacecraft, which would come to Earth and take them to heaven – the "Next Level". When Bonnie Lou Nettles (Ti) died of cancer in 1985, the group's doctrine was confounded because Nettles was "chosen" by the Next Level to be a messenger on Earth, yet her body had died instead of leaving physically to outer space. Their belief system was then revised to include the leaving of consciousness from the body as equivalent to leaving the Earth in a spacecraft.

The group declared that it was against suicide, because in its own context, to commit suicide is "to turn against the Next Level when it is being offered", and the members of the group also believed that their human bodies were only "vehicles" which were meant to help them on their journey. Therefore, by committing suicide, they would not allow their consciousness to leave their human bodies and join the next level; they would remain alive rather than participate in the group suicide because suicide was considered the suicide of their consciousness. In conversations, when they referred to a person or a person's body, they routinely used the word "vehicle".

The members of the group adopted names which consisted of three letters followed by the suffix -ody to signify themselves as "children of the Next Level". This is mentioned in Applewhite's final video, Do's Final Exit, filmed March 19–20, 1997, just days prior to the suicides.

They believed that "to be eligible for membership in the Next Level, humans would have to shed every attachment to the planet". This meant all members had to give up all human-like characteristics, such as family, friends, gender, sexuality, individuality, jobs, money, and possessions. "The Evolutionary Level Above Human" (TELAH) was a "physical, corporeal place", another world in our universe, where residents live in pure bliss and nourish themselves by absorbing pure sunlight. At the next level, beings do not engage in sexual intercourse, eating or dying, the things that make humans "mammalian". Heaven's Gate believed that what the Bible calls God is a highly developed extraterrestrial.

Members of Heaven's Gate believed that evil space aliens – Luciferians – falsely represented themselves to Earthlings as "God" and conspired to keep humans from developing. As technically advanced humanoids, these aliens have spacecraft, space-time travel, telepathy, and increased longevity. They use holograms to fake miracles. They are carnal beings with gender, and they stopped training to achieve the Kingdom of God thousands of years ago. Heaven's Gate believed that all existing religions on Earth had been corrupted by these aliens.

Although these basic beliefs of the group generally stayed consistent over the years, "the details of their ideology were flexible enough to undergo modification over time". There are examples of the group's adding to or slightly changing their beliefs, such as: modifying the way one can enter the Next Level, changing the way they described themselves, placing more importance on the idea of Satan, and adding several other New Age concepts. One of these concepts was the belief of extraterrestrial walk-ins; when the group began, "Applewhite and Nettles taught their followers that they were extraterrestrial beings [...] after the notion of walk-ins became popular within the New Age subculture, the Two changed their tune and began describing themselves as extraterrestrial walk-ins." A walk-in can be defined as "an entity who occupies a body that has been vacated by its original soul". Heaven's Gate came to believe an extraterrestrial walk-in is "a walk-in that is supposedly from another planet".

The concept of walk-ins aided Applewhite and Nettles in personally starting from what they considered to be "clean slates". In this clean slate, they were no longer considered to be the people they had been prior to the start of the group, but had taken on a new life; this concept gave them a way to "erase their human personal histories as the histories of souls who formerly occupied the bodies of Applewhite and Nettles". Over time, Applewhite revised his identity in the group to encourage the belief that the "walk-in" that was inhabiting his body was the same that had done so to Jesus 2,000 years ago. Similar to Nestorianism, this belief stated that the personage of Jesus and the spirit of Jesus were separable. This meant that Jesus was simply the name of the body of an ordinary man that held no sacred properties, that was taken over by an incorporeal sacred entity to deliver "next level" information.

=== Techniques to enter the next level ===
According to Heaven's Gate, once the individual has perfected himself through the "process", there were four methods to enter or "graduate" to the next level:

1. Physical pickup onto a TELAH spacecraft and transfer to a next level body aboard that craft. In this version, what Professor Zeller calls a "UFO" version of the "Rapture", an alien spacecraft would descend to Earth and collect Applewhite, Nettles, and their followers, and their human bodies would be transformed through biological and chemical processes to perfected beings.
2. Natural death, accidental death, or death from random violence. Here, the "graduating soul" leaves the human container for a perfected next-level body.
3. Outside persecution that leads to death. After the deaths of the Branch Davidians in Waco, Texas, and the events involving Randy Weaver at Ruby Ridge, Applewhite was afraid the American government would murder the members of Heaven's Gate.
4. Willful exit from the body in a dignified manner. Near the end, Applewhite had a revelation that they might have to abandon their human bodies and achieve the next level as Jesus had done. This occurred when 39 members died by suicide and "graduated".

Animals were said to have souls, and a soul in an animal could enter the next level, a human soul, if it becomes a servant of humans, such as in a guide dog, and "sees itself as a family member in that human family".

== Structure ==
The group was open only to adults over the age of 18. Members gave up their possessions and lived an ascetic life devoid of indulgences. The group was tightly knit, and everything was communally shared. In public, each member of the group always carried a five-dollar bill and a roll of quarters. Eight men in the group, including Applewhite, voluntarily underwent castration as an extreme means of maintaining the ascetic lifestyle. The group initially attempted castration by having one of its members, a former nurse, perform the castration, but this almost resulted in the patient's death, and caused at least one member to leave Heaven's Gate. Every castration that followed was done in a hospital.

The group earned revenue by offering professional website development under the business name Higher Source. An estimated 30 to 40 percent of Higher Source's website development work was under contract to InterAct Entertainment Group, run by president, Nick Matzorkis.

The cultural theorist Paul Virilio described the group as a cybersect, due to its heavy reliance on computer-mediated communication prior to its collective suicide.

== In popular culture ==
In 1979, Gary Sherman produced the made-for-TV movie Mysterious Two for NBC, based on the exploits of Applewhite and Nettles, then relatively unknown, which aired in 1982.

In its first live episode following the mass suicide, Saturday Night Live aired a sketch where the cult members made it to space. It was followed by a commercial parody for Keds, featuring the tagline, "Worn by level-headed Christians", as well as footage of the Nike-clad corpses of the Heaven's Gate members.

In 2017, Heaven's Gate was the subject of a 10-part podcast of the same name produced by Glynn Washington to commemorate the 20th anniversary of the mass suicide.

In 2018, rapper Lil Uzi Vert posted a concept album art for their then-upcoming album, Eternal Atake. Soon after, they were threatened with legal action by Marc and Sarah King, the couple responsible for maintaining the group's website and intellectual property. A representative for the two wrote "[Uzi] is using and adapting our copyrights and trademarks without our permission and the infringement will be taken up with our attorneys. This is not fair use or parody; it is a direct and clear infringement". The teased cover contained a logo almost identical to the Heaven's Gate logo, with similar text and visuals below. When the album officially released, it would be changed substantially to instead feature three figures standing on the moon, accompanied by a UFO overhead.

Heaven's Gate: The Cult of Cults, a documentary miniseries about the cult, was released on HBO Max in 2020.

In 2021, Heaven's Gate, featured on an episode titled "A Tale of Two Cults", was one of the subjects in the first season of Vice Media's documentary television series Dark Side of the 90s.

The Leader, a historical biopic about the cult starring Vera Farmiga as Nettles and Tim Blake Nelson as Applewhite, premiered at the 2026 Tribeca Festival and the 2026 Fantasia International Film Festival to critical acclaim. Written and directed by Michael Gallagher, who was eight-years-old when the mass suicide occurred in his neighborhood in San Diego, California. Jim Parsons, Grace Caroline Currey, and Simon Rex play fictionalized versions of key cult members.

=== Nike Decades ===
The infamy which was caused by the mass suicides, their limited availability, and their sudden discontinuation have been cited as reasons for the high resale value of Nike Decades.

== See also ==
- UFO religion
- Peoples Temple
  - Jonestown
- Movement for the Restoration of the Ten Commandments of God
- Aum Shinrikyo
  - Tokyo subway sarin attack
- Violence by UFO believers
