= Benjamin E. Zeller =

American academic and author

- Born: Benjamin Ethan Zeller
- Citizenship: United States
- Occupations: Historian of religion, professor, and author

Academic background
- Education: University of Rochester (BA); Harvard University (MTS); University of North Carolina (PhD)

Academic work
- Sub-discipline: Academic study of new religious movements
- Institutions: Lake Forest College
- Notable works: Prophets and Protons, Heaven's Gate: America's UFO Religion
- Website: www.nrms.net

Benjamin Ethan Zeller is an American historian of religion and author who studies new religious movements. He is a professor and chair of religious studies at Lake Forest College. Zeller graduated with a BA degree in religious studies from the University of Rochester in 1999 and received an MTS degree from Harvard University in 2002. He earned a PhD in religious studies from the University of North Carolina in 2007.

Zeller has authored two books on new religious movements: Prophets and Protons and Heaven's Gate: America's UFO Religion. The latter was the first monograph on Heaven's Gate. He has edited or co-edited several other books, including the Handbook of UFO Religions. Zeller is most well known for his work on the UFO religion Heaven's Gate; he was the academic consultant to the 2018 Heaven's Gate podcast and appeared in the 2020 documentary series, Heaven's Gate: The Cult of Cults.

== Education and career ==
Benjamin Ethan Zeller graduated with a Bachelor of Arts degree in religious studies from the University of Rochester in 1999; he went on to receive a Master of Theological Studies from Harvard University's Harvard Divinity School in 2002. He earned a PhD in religious studies from the University of North Carolina in 2007.

Zeller is a historian of religion, and was an assistant professor at Brevard College from 2007 to 2012. In 2012, he was a Fulbright Fellow at Åbo Akademi University in Turku, Finland. He is a professor and chair of religious studies at Lake Forest College. He is on the editorial board of the academic journal Nova Religio, and is a member of the American Academy of Religion, the American Society of Church History, and the International Society for the Study of New Religions.

== Works ==
Zeller's works largely focus on new religious movements (NRMs), on which he has authored two books. His first book, Prophets and Protons: New Religious Movements and Science in Late Twentieth-Century America, was published in 2010 by New York University Press. Zeller spent five years researching for the book, talking with several members of the NRMs profiled. It examines the relationship between several NRMs and their relationship to scientific advances and developments; he argues that contrary to some popular beliefs, the relationship between science and religion is not always in contradiction. It mainly focuses on three NRMs in three sections: the Unification Church, International Society for Krishna Consciousness, and Heaven's Gate.

He has also edited or co-edited several edited volumes. In 2014, he was one of four co-editors of Religion, Food, and Eating in North America, published by Columbia University Press. He authored the last chapter, discussing and analyzing locavorism and vegetarianism. That year, with George D. Chryssides he edited the 2014 book The Bloomsbury Companion to New Religious Movements, published by Bloomsbury Publishing. In 2021, he edited the Handbook of UFO Religions, published by Brill; in the introduction he discusses the history of the study and scholarship of UFO religions. In 2023, he and Marie W. Dallam co-edited Religion, Attire, and Adornment in North America, published by Columbia University Press.

=== Heaven's Gate ===
Zeller's second book, Heaven's Gate: America's UFO Religion, was published in 2014, by New York University Press. It was the first monograph on Heaven's Gate, which notoriously committed mass suicide in 1997. 39 people died in this incident. Zeller mostly focuses on the beliefs of the group. He rejects the idea that the Heaven's Gate members were brainwashed and analyzes many aspects of the group, including their religious practices, origins, and theology. He devotes an entire chapter, "Why Suicide", to what led them to suicide.

Zeller took an interest in Heaven's Gate following immediately after their 1997 mass suicide, when he was a college sophomore. Shortly after the suicides, he spoke to a former member of Heaven's Gate who did not participate, Chuck Humphrey. Humphrey later also went on to kill himself, shocking Zeller; he credited this for a change in how he thought of Heaven's Gate.

Zeller was the academic consultant to and appeared on the 2018 Heaven's Gate podcast. The podcast creators sought out Zeller due to his 2014 book and how in it he had attempted to not validate but understand Heaven's Gate's appeal. He also appeared in the 2020 television series on the group, partially based on the podcast, Heaven's Gate: The Cult of Cults, as well as a 20/20 ABC documentary, The Cult Next Door: The Mystery and Madness of Heaven's Gate.

== Bibliography ==
- —— (2010). Prophets and Protons: New Religious Movements and Science in Late Twentieth-Century America. New York University Press. ISBN 978-0-8147-9720-4.
- ——; Dallam, Marie W.; Nielson, Reid L.; Rubel, Nora L., eds. (2014). Religion, Food, and Eating in North America. New York: Columbia University Press. ISBN 978-0-231-16030-8.
- Chryssides, George D.; ——, eds. (2014). The Bloomsbury Companion to New Religious Movements. London: Bloomsbury Publishing. ISBN 978-1-4411-9005-5.
  - Chryssides, George D.; ——, eds. (2026). The Bloomsbury Companion to New Religious Movements (2nd ed.). London: Bloomsbury Publishing. ISBN 978-1-350-55935-6.
- —— (2014). Heaven's Gate: America's UFO Religion. New York University Press. ISBN 978-1-4798-0381-1.
- ——, ed. (2021). Handbook of UFO Religions. Boston: Brill Publishers. ISBN 978-90-04-43437-0.
- Dallam, Marie W.; ——, eds. (2023). Religion, Attire, and Adornment in North America. New York: Columbia University Press. ISBN 978-0-231-20444-6.
