= These C*cksucking Tears =

- Directed by: Dan Taberski
- Produced by: Dan Taberski; Christy Lamb
- Starring: Patrick Haggerty
- Cinematography: Damon Hoydysh
- Edited by: David Mehlman
- Music by: Patrick Haggerty
- Release date: March 12, 2016 (SXSW)
- Running time: 15 min.
- Country: United States
- Language: English

These C*cksucking Tears is a 2016 American documentary short film directed by Dan Taberski and starring Patrick Haggerty. It is based on his life and struggles as an openly gay person and musician with the band Lavender Country.

The film opened at SXSW in March 2016, and won the award for Best Documentary Short. It subsequently screened at a number of LGBT and general interest film festivals, winning the award for Best Documentary Short at Outfest in Los Angeles and the Seattle International Film Festival.

The film is named for the band's song "Crying These Cocksucking Tears".

== Reception ==
When the film screened at the DC Shorts Film Festival in Washington, D.C., Metro Weekly gave it a four-star rating.
