= Josh Dean (writer) =

American writer

Josh Dean is an American journalist and author. He is known for his 2017 non-fiction book The Taking of K-129: How the CIA Used Howard Hughes to Steal a Russian Sub in the Most Daring Covert Operation in History. He is co-creator and host of the true-crime podcast, The Clearing, and founded his own podcast company, Campside Media, in 2019.

== Early life and education ==
Josh Dean is a graduate of Wittenberg University in Ohio.

== Career ==
Dean served as deputy editor of Men's Journal until 2004. He has written for Rolling Stone, Popular Science, Men's Journal, GQ, Travel + Leisure, New York, Entertainment Weekly, Inc., Fast Company, Men's Health, Runner's World. He is currently a correspondent for Outside. He was a founding editor of PLAY, The New York Times now-defunct sports magazine.

His first book was Show Dog, published in 2012. His article/ebook, The Life and Times of the Stopwatch Gang (2021), was optioned by Bluegrass Films/Universal Pictures.

In 2017 he published his non-fiction work The Taking of K-129: How the CIA Used Howard Hughes to Steal a Russian Sub in the Most Daring Covert Operation in History.

In the fall of 2019, he started his own podcast company, Campside Media, with two journalists, Matthew Shaer and Vanessa Grigoriadis, and a third partner, Adam Hoff, who is a producer and screenwriter. Campside's lead investor is Sister, a global entertainment studio founded by Elisabeth Murdoch, Stacey Snider, and Jane Featherstone in 2019. Campside's debut show, Chameleon, is about a notorious scammer known as the Hollywood Con Queen. The show helped expose the name of a suspect, who was arrested just a few weeks later. Chameleon is part of a slate deal Campside has with Sony Podcasts.

Dean is the co-creator and host of the true-crime audio documentary series, The Clearing, a co-production of Gimlet and Pineapple Street Studios.

Dean is the co-executive producer and one of the main characters of Netflix show Crime Scene: The Vanishing at the Cecil Hotel (2021), which was inspired by his story about Elisa Lam and the Cecil Hotel.
