= The Catch and Kill Podcast with Ronan Farrow =

Documentary podcast by Ronan Farrow

The Catch and Kill Podcast with Ronan Farrow is a documentary podcast by Ronan Farrow and produced by Pineapple Street Studios.

== Background ==
The show is hosted by Ronan Farrow and produced by Pineapple Street Studios. Farrow's co-investigator for the story was Rick Hugh. The show debuted in November 2019 a month after the book. The subject of the show is the Harvey Weinstein sexual abuse cases. An excerpt of the show was first previewed in The New Yorker Radio Hour. Episode 3, "The Wire", discusses Ambra Gutierrez. The podcast is largely composed of interviews with the victims discussed in the book. The show includes an interview with Igor Ostrovskiy. The podcast goes into more detail about Matt Lauer being fired from NBC.

=== Awards ===
Award	Date	Category	Result	Ref.
Peabody Awards	2019	Podcast	Nominated	
Webby Awards	2020	Best Limited Series	Won	
Digiday Awards	2020	Best Podcast	Won	
