= Good Hang with Amy Poehler =

Podcast hosted by Amy Poehler

- Genre: Comedy
- Format: Talk show; Interview podcast
- Language: English

Creative team
- Created by: Bill Simmons; Amy Poehler; Jenna Weiss-Berman

Cast and voices
- Hosted by: Amy Poehler

Music
- Composed by: Amy Miles

Production
- Production: Paper Kite Productions; The Ringer
- Length: 50–84 minutes

Publication
- No. of episodes: 87
- Original release: March 18, 2025 – present
- Updates: Weekly (Tuesday)

Good Hang with Amy Poehler is a comedy interview podcast hosted by actress and comedian Amy Poehler. Each episode features Poehler in conversation with guests, discussing their careers and everyday lives. The double first episodes, featuring actors Tina Fey and Martin Short, were released on March 18, 2025. It is executive produced by Poehler for her Paper Kite Productions, Bill Simmons under his The Ringer banner, and Jenna Weiss-Berman. It won the inaugural Golden Globe Award for Best Podcast at the 83rd ceremony.

== Background and format ==
In February 2025, Amy Poehler appointed podcast producer Jenna Weiss-Berman to lead the audio division of her production company, Paper Kite Productions. That same month, it was reported that Poehler would launch her own podcast, Good Hang with Amy Poehler, in collaboration with Spotify and The Ringer. It is her second podcast after the comedy scripted Say More with Dr? Sheila in 2023.

In each episode, Poehler interviews special guests, focusing on their careers and everyday lives. The show features "a hilarious mix of comedy, personal stories and not-too-serious conversations". Before the main interview, she speaks with people who know the guest personally in a video call to gather insights and potential questions for the interview. New episodes are released weekly each Tuesday, along with the accompanying video versions on the podcast's YouTube channel.

The podcast hosted a live recording at The Fonda Theatre in Los Angeles on December 4, 2025, featuring Maya Rudolph as a surprise guest. It also included appearances by comedian Ron Funches and the podcast's theme music composer Amy Miles. The podcast hosted its second live recording at The Town Hall, New York City, on August 11, 2026. It featured surprise guest D'Arcy Carden and included appearances by William Jackson Harper and Abbi Jacobson. The third live Good Hang with Amy Poehler episode was hosted at The Vic Theatre, Chicago, on October 18, 2026. It featured surprise guest Alanis Morissette.

== Reception ==
=== Critical reception ===
Good Hang with Amy Poehler received widespread critical acclaim and was included in several year-end best podcast lists. Elisabeth Garber-Paul of Rolling Stone ranked it third among the best podcasts of 2025, likening it to "being at a dinner table with some of the brightest, and funniest, minds of our times". Writing for BBC, Francis Agustin praised Poehler's interviewing style, noting that she "leverag[es] her signature humour and infectious laugh to disarm her guests". Agustin also wrote that the podcast "mak[es] you feel like you're in a room hanging out with your closest friends". The Guardian described the podcast as "a tonic of a series that offers levity, joy and just the right amount of celebrity schmoozing". The publication also praised the twenty-fourth episode, featuring Aubrey Plaza, describing its conversation about loss as "a masterclass in engaging with a friend's grief". Emily McCombs of HuffPost described the podcast as "a true win for the girls" and called Poehler's conversations with women guests "powerful". Lauren Passell of Lifehacker described the podcast as a "comfort-listen that will leave you feeling like you've just been hugged".

=== Year-end lists ===
Year-end rankings for Good Hang with Amy Poehler
Publication	List	Rank	Ref.
BBC	10 of the best podcasts of 2025 so far	Unranked	
Esquire	The 20 Best Podcasts of 2025	Unranked	
The Guardian	The 20 best podcasts of 2025	7	
HuffPost	The Best Podcasts Of 2025	Unranked	
Lifehacker	The 20 Most Essential Podcasts of 2025 (and Two Episodes You Can't Miss)	Unranked	
Rolling Stone	10 Best Podcasts of 2025	3	

=== Commercial performance ===
In November 2025, Apple Podcasts released its annual list of the platform's most popular podcasts, with Good Hang with Amy Poehler topping the Top New Shows of 2025 chart. The podcast was ranked tenth on The Top 50 Podcasts in the United States on Spotify in 2025.

== Episodes ==
No.	Title	Length	Original release date
1	"Tina Fey Joins the Debut Episode of Good Hang With Amy Poehler"	55:07	March 18, 2025
Guest stars: Tina Fey, Fred Armisen, Rachel Dratch, Zarna Garg, and Seth Meyers
2	"Martin Short Joins Good Hang With Amy Poehler"	59:56	March 18, 2025
Guest stars: Martin Short, Tina Fey, Colin Jost, and Maya Rudolph
3	"Rashida Jones Joins for a 'Parks and Rec' Reunion"	57:27	March 25, 2025
Guest stars: Rashida Jones, D'Arcy Carden, and Retta
4	"Ike Barinholtz Is a Party Pumper"	54:02	April 1, 2025
Guest stars: Ike Barinholtz, Kathryn Hahn, and Emily Spivey
5	"Quinta Brunson Joins Good Hang With Amy Poehler"	57:33	April 8, 2025
Guest stars: Quinta Brunson, Zack Evans, Andrew Gauthier, Ash Perez, and Kate Peterman
6	"Kathryn Hahn Joins Good Hang With Amy Poehler"	52:39	April 15, 2025
Guest stars: Kathryn Hahn and Patti LuPone
7	"Jack Black Joins Good Hang With Amy Poehler"	1:04:17	April 22, 2025
Guest stars: Jack Black
8	"Paige DeSorbo and Hannah Berner Join Good Hang With Amy Poehler"	1:00:30	April 29, 2025
Guest stars: Paige DeSorbo and Hannah Berner, Kim DeSorbo, and Lenore DiLeo-Berner
9	"Paul Rudd Joins Good Hang With Amy Poehler"	1:06:00	May 6, 2025
Guest stars: Paul Rudd and Jon Hamm
10	"Michelle Obama Joins Good Hang With Amy Poehler"	59:34	May 13, 2025
Guest stars: Michelle Obama and Craig Robinson
11	"Mike Schur, Adam Scott, and Rashida Jones Introduce the 'Philly Justice' Trailer"	1:15:15	May 20, 2025
Guest stars: Michael Schur, Rashida Jones, Morgan Sackett, and Adam Scott
12	"Reneé Rapp Knows Altos Are Important"	1:01:55	May 27, 2025
Guest stars: Reneé Rapp and Cara Delevingne
13	"Seth Meyers on Starting at 'SNL' With Amy Poehler"	59:23	June 3, 2025
Guest stars: Seth Meyers and Mike Shoemaker
14	"Dakota Johnson and Her Dog Are the Stars of Good Hang"	57:26	June 10, 2025
Guest stars: Dakota Johnson (and her dog Tokyo) and Blake Lee
15	"Will Forte on His Infamous 'SNL' Audition"	59:12	June 17, 2025
Guest stars: Will Forte and Tina Fey
16	"Natasha Lyonne Is the Oldest Girl in the World"	59:14	June 24, 2025
Guest stars: Natasha Lyonne, Ronan Farrow, and Jeremy O. Harris
17	"Idris Elba Knows That Life Begins at 50 in Ibiza"	1:05:13	July 1, 2025
Guest stars: Idris Elba and John Cena
18	"Andy Samberg on Having Little Brother Energy"	1:13:10	July 8, 2025
Guest stars: Andy Samberg and Seth Meyers
19	"Cole Escola on Having the Perfect Face for Wigs"	1:01:10	July 15, 2025
Guest stars: Cole Escola and Amy Sedaris
20	"The Cosmic Meeting of Abbi Jacobson and Ilana Glazer"	1:09:42	July 22, 2025
Guest stars: Abbi Jacobson, Ilana Glazer, Kate Arend, and Kim Lessing
21	"Leanne Morgan Is Just Getting Started"	1:14:06	July 29, 2025
Guest stars: Leanne Morgan and Kristen Johnston
22	"The Jonas Brothers and Conflict Resolution"	53:16	August 5, 2025
Guest stars: Jonas Brothers (Joe Jonas, Kevin Jonas, and Nick Jonas) and Jack McBrayer
23	"Adam Scott Is Tired From All the Running on Severance"	1:09:52	August 12, 2025
Guest stars: Adam Scott and Nick Offerman
24	"Aubrey Plaza and Amy Poehler Reunite"	1:07:51	August 19, 2025
Guest stars: Aubrey Plaza and Margaret Qualley
25	"Zarna Garg Talks About Tour Life"	1:20:37	August 26, 2025
Guest stars: Zarna Garg and Zoya Garg
26	"Judge Judy Knows Her Worth"	1:05:51	September 2, 2025
Guest stars: Judy Sheindlin and Eileen Roman
27	"Selena Gomez Dishes on Steve Martin, Martin Short, and Orange Peels"	1:03:42	September 9, 2025
Guest stars: Selena Gomez and Martin Short
28	"Olivia Colman Is a Good Crier"	1:05:39	September 16, 2025
Guest stars: Olivia Colman and Benedict Cumberbatch
29	"Regina Hall on 'Dateline,' DiCaprio, and Mammograms"	1:08:37	September 23, 2025
Guest stars: Regina Hall and Andrew Rannells
30	"Kristen Wiig Is Volunteering to Make Metallica Quieter"	1:02:57	September 30, 2025
Guest stars: Kristen Wiig and Bill Hader
31	"We Owe Rachel Dratch Royalties for This Podcast"	1:19:23	October 7, 2025
Guest stars: Rachel Dratch and Kevin Cahoon
32	"Aziz Ansari Is Still Using His Flip Phone"	1:04:36	October 14, 2025
Guest stars: Aziz Ansari and Rashida Jones
33	"Mariska Hargitay Never Gets Tired of a Bit"	1:04:14	October 21, 2025
Guest stars: Mariska Hargitay and Christopher Meloni
34	"Kate McKinnon Is Getting Really Into Trim Carpentry"	1:05:27	October 28, 2025
Guest stars: Kate McKinnon and Aidy Bryant
35	"Maya Hawke has a Cup Theory She'd Like to Sell You"	50:42	November 4, 2025
Guest stars: Maya Hawke and Willa Fitzgerald
36	"Sebastian Maniscalco Has a Little More Pepper in His Hair These Days (Live)"	1:14:02	November 7, 2025
Guest stars: Sebastian Maniscalco and Pete Correale
37	"Don't Ask June Squibb to do a Polish Accent"	58:48	November 11, 2025
Guest stars: June Squibb and Will Forte
38	"Ariana Grande Has No Problem With Being 5-Foot-2"	1:05:28	November 18, 2025
Guest stars: Ariana Grande and Bowen Yang
39	"Ina Garten Knows Never to Show up to a Podcast Taping Empty Handed"	1:08:29	November 26, 2025
Guest stars: Ina Garten and Julia Louis-Dreyfus
40	"Hayley Williams Made Sure She Warmed Up and Warmed Down for this Podcast"	1:09:05	December 3, 2025
Guest stars: Hayley Williams and Doug Peck
41	"Julia Louis-Dreyfus Has a Lot of Photos on Her Phone"	1:04:42	December 9, 2025
Guest stars: Julia Louis-Dreyfus and Tony Hale
42	"Maya Rudolph is a Real Natural (Live)"	1:22:36	December 11, 2025
Guest stars: Maya Rudolph and Ron Funches
43	"Rachel Sennott Isn't Afraid of Flopping"	1:12:43	December 16, 2025
Guest stars: Rachel Sennott and Molly Gordon
44	"Ana Gasteyer Is Ready to Cut the Shit"	1:11:19	December 23, 2025
Guest stars: Ana Gasteyer and Paula Pell
45	"Gwyneth Paltrow Watches TV in Bed"	0:56:13	January 6, 2026
Guest stars: Gwyneth Paltrow and Josh Safdie
46	"Ryan Coogler Knows That You Need A Hook"	1:02:47	January 13, 2026
Guest stars: Ryan Coogler and Ludwig Goransson
47	"Jennifer Lawrence Tells Us What Her 'Below Deck' Job Would Be"	0:54:33	January 20, 2026
Guest stars: Jennifer Lawrence and Justine Ciarrocchi
48	"Claire Danes Talks About the Lasting Power of Jordan Catalano"	1:12:09	January 27, 2026
Guest stars: Claire Danes and Mandy Patinkin
49	"For Carol Burnett, the Best Part of Being in Your 90s Is Not Being 105"	1:08:24	February 3, 2026
Guest stars: Carol Burnett and Rachel Dratch
50	"Jonathan Groff Is a Good, Nice Boy"	1:22:41	February 10, 2026
Guest stars: Jonathan Groff and Gracie Lawrence
51	"Sarah McLachlan Has Always Been Ahead of Her Time"	1:01:44	February 17, 2026
Guest stars: Sarah McLachlan and Sheryl Crow
52	"Viola Davis Can Do Everything but Bake"	1:18:10	March 17, 2026
Guest stars: Viola Davis and Julius Tennon
53	"Steve Carell's Got a Good Embouchure"	1:15:39	March 24, 2026
Guest stars: Steve Carell and Stephen Colbert
54	"Brandi Carlile Is Buying Everyone She Knows a Mattress"	1:11:32	March 31, 2026
Guest stars: Brandi Carlile and Maren Morris
55	"Fred Armisen Is Not Impressed With Free Climbers"	1:07:49	April 7, 2026
Guest stars: Fred Armisen and Carrie Brownstein
56	"Kerry Washington Would Crush on 'The Amazing Race'"	1:06:57	April 14, 2026
Guest stars: Kerry Washington and Tony Goldwyn
57	"Nick Offerman Is Going to Play Us His Ukulele Song"	1:04:11	April 21, 2026
Guest stars: Nick Offerman and Aubrey Plaza
58	"Jon Hamm Is a Proud Member of the Loser's Lounge"	1:11:09	April 28, 2026
Guest stars: Jon Hamm and John Slattery
59	"Billie Eilish Is a Horse Girl and a Fangirl"	1:22:46	May 5, 2026
Guest stars: Billie Eilish and Finneas O'Connell
60	"Da'Vine Joy Randolph Has Some Copper Cookware She Wants to Recommend"	1:12:19	May 12, 2026
Guest stars: Da'Vine Joy Randolph and David Freyne
61	"Paula Pell Has Too Much Love and Medication"	1:11:06	May 19, 2026
Guest stars: Paula Pell and Kim Kardashian
62	"Lena Dunham Knows You Have to Do a Trick to Get a Treat"	1:04:14	May 26, 2026
Guest stars: Lena Dunham and Natalie Portman
63	"Tom Holland Is Saving Movies and Masculinity"	1:14:19	June 2, 2026
Guest stars: Tom Holland and Jacob Batalon
64	"Colman Domingo Has Oprah in His Corner"	1:12:13	June 9, 2026
Guest stars: Colman Domingo and Steven Spielberg
65	"Sarah Sherman Knows You Can’t Show Your Feet for Free"	1:11:47	June 16, 2026
Guest stars: Sarah Sherman and Mitra Jouhari
66	"Greta Lee Lives in L.A. and Grows Vegetables Now"	1:12:25	June 23, 2026
Guest stars: Greta Lee and Alison Roman
67	"Mindy Kaling Is a Mogul"	1:00:45	June 30, 2026
Guest stars: Mindy Kaling and Avantika
68	"Checking Out 'Temptation Island' With Matt Damon"	1:11:53	July 7, 2026
Guest stars: Matt Damon and Christopher Nolan
69	"Will Ferrell Has Major Captain Energy"	1:13:53	July 14, 2026
Guest stars: Will Ferrell and Chris Parnell
70	"John Cena Is the Babyface of This Podcast"	1:05:46	July 21, 2026
Guest stars: John Cena and Cody Rhodes
71	"For Anne Lamott, It Goes Jesus, the Cat, and Then Everyone Else"	1:07:44	July 28, 2026
Guest stars: Anne Lamott and Tina Fey
72	"Lena Waithe Is Always Cool"	1:12:52	August 4, 2026
Guest stars: Lena Waithe, Zhailon Levingston and Bill Rauch
73	"Rosie O'Donnell Is Re-Famous"	1:13:57	August 11, 2026
Guest stars: Rosie O'Donnell and Cynthia Nixon
74	"Keke Palmer Can Do It All"	1:03:49	August 18, 2026
Guest stars: Keke Palmer and Paula Pell
75	"D’Arcy Carden Is Beyond One Hundred (Live)"	1:24:28	August 25, 2026
Guest stars: D'Arcy Carden, William Jackson Harper, and Abbi Jacobson
76	"Kenan Thompson Showed Up in Some Gucci Glasses"	1:06:16	September 1, 2026
Guest stars: Kenan Thompson and Maya Rudolph
77	"Sandra Bullock Spoke the Perfect Amount on This Podcast"	1:10:39	September 8, 2026
Guest stars: Sandra Bullock, Maisie Williams, and Joey King
78	"Robert De Niro Said That We Can Call Him Bob"	1:17:08	September 15, 2026
Guest stars: Robert De Niro, Rachel Dratch, Seth Meyers, and Jane Rosenthal
79	"Ashley Padilla Is So Good at Impressions"	1:14:39	September 22, 2026
Guest stars: Ashley Padilla and Andrew Dismukes
80	"Andrew Garfield Is a Real Tenderoni"	1:09:08	September 29, 2026
Guest stars: Andrew Garfield and Lin-Manuel Miranda
81	"Marcello Hernández Is Going to Tell Us What His Deal Is"	1:15:01	October 6, 2026
Guest stars: Marcello Hernández and Sarah Sherman
82	"Paul McCartney Is Music"	1:16:00	October 13, 2026
Guest stars: Paul McCartney and Stella McCartney
83	"Kate Berlant Was Seeing a Few Too Many Ghosts for a While"	1:08:36	October 20, 2026
Guest stars: Kate Berlant and John Early
84	"Noah Wyle Is People’s Sexiest Man Alive!"	1:15:08	October 27, 2026
Guest stars: Noah Wyle and Shawn Hatosy
85	"Alanis Morissette Is a Shaky Poodle on the Inside and a Black Stallion on the Outside (Live)"	1:13:32	November 3, 2026
Guest stars: Alanis Morissette and Kelly Kroyer
86	"Robyn Loves to Lie Down on the Floor"	1:09:36	November 10, 2026
Guest stars: Robyn and Zara Larsson
87	"Andrew Scott Is Really Good at Understanding Shakespeare"	1:13:48	November 17, 2026
Guest stars: Andrew Scott and Olivia Colman

== Accolades ==
Accolades received by Good Hang with Amy Poehler
Award	Year (Note: Indicates the year of ceremony)	Category	Recipient(s)	Result	Ref.
GLAAD Media Awards	2026	Outstanding Podcast Episode	"Reneé Rapp"	Nominated	
Golden Globe Awards	2026	Best Podcast	Good Hang with Amy Poehler	Won	
iHeartPodcast Awards	2026	Podcast of the Year	Good Hang with Amy Poehler	Nominated	
iHeartPodcast Awards	2026	Best Comedy	Good Hang with Amy Poehler	Won	
iHeartPodcast Awards	2026	Best Overall Host	Amy Poehler	Nominated	
