= The Nightingale of Iran =

Podcast about Younes Dardashti

The Nightingale of Iran is a six episode documentary podcast co-created by sisters Danielle Dardashti and Galeet Dardashti, presented by the Jewish Telegraphic Agency, and distributed by PRX.

In the show, the sisters explore their family's multi-generational puzzling musical history, and search for the truth of why their family left Iran in the 1960s at the height of national fame.

Danielle Dardashti is the host, writer, director, and senior producer. Galeet Dardashti is the musical director, producer, and subject expert. The show includes clips of music and family tapes, as well as interviews with experts and family members.

== Background ==
The six-episode audio documentary was released in March 2024.

Younes Dardashti, an Iranian musical icon and grandfather of Danielle and Galeet, was known as the "Nightingale of Iran" for his powerful voice. In the Dardashti family, his Jewish musical legacy was cherished and passed down through generations. Their father, Younes’ son Farid, became a teen idol, singing on Iranian TV in the 1960s before leaving to study in the United States. There he met their mother, Sheila, an Ashkenazi folk singer from New York. As children, Danielle, Galeet and their sister Michelle (now the rabbi at Brooklyn's Kane Street Synagogue) traveled the country with their parents in a Jewish American family band.

It was only when the sisters began researching their grandfather that another image emerged — that of a Jewish Iranian artist who never found the same acceptance among Jews as he did with Iran's Muslim public, an audience he would ultimately lose in the Iranian Revolution. Performing under the shadow of a stigmatized tradition, in which Jews barred from many industries were historically overrepresented as hired musicians or “motrebs,” Younes left Iran during a short-lived golden age for its Jewish minority.

== Reception ==
In 2024 the show was an official participant in the Tribeca Festival 2024 Creators Market.

The Nightingale of Iran podcast has generated press attention from a number of media outlets, including Jewish Journal, The Wrap, Hadassah Magazine, Kveller, Variety, Hey Alma, JTA, Haaretz, My Jewish Learning, Mentally? A Magpie, and The Forward.

=== Awards ===
Award	Date	Category	Result	Ref.
Signal Awards	2024	Limited Series & Specials - Best Writing	Gold	
Signal Awards	2024	Limited Series & Specials - Documentary	Silver	
Signal Awards	2024	Limited Series & Specials - Documentary	Listener's Choice	
Ambies	2025	Best Indie Podcast	Nominated	
Quill Podcast Awards	2024	Best Podcast of the Year	Won	
Quill Podcast Awards	2024	Best Society & Culture Podcast	Won	
Podcast Awards	2024	Best Music Podcast	Won	
Simon Rockower Award	2025	Award for Excellence in Arts — Review/Criticism	1	
International Women's Podcast Awards	2024	Moment of Compelling Storytelling	Shortlisted	

== Creators ==
Danielle Dardashti is an Emmy award-winning documentary writer/producer, a former on-air TV news reporter, and a storySLAM champion who has been featured on NPR's Moth Radio Hour. She is the co-author of the Jewish Family Fun Book (Jewish Lights) and co-founder/Creative Director of live storytelling show Storyboom. Danielle, CEO of dash., leads corporate storytelling workshops all over the world.

Galeet Dardashti is a musician and anthropologist of Middle Eastern Jewish culture. In her new release, Monajat, she sings and composes around samples of her famed Iranian grandfather - The Nightingale of Iran - with an acclaimed ensemble of musicians. She has held assistant professor positions at JTS and NYU and is currently a Fellow at University of Pennsylvania's Katz Center.
