= Natalia Mehlman Petrzela =

American historian

- Education: Columbia University (BA); Stanford University (PhD)
- Scientific career
- Fields: History
- Workplaces: The New School

Natalia Yael Mehlman Petrzela is an American historian, specializing in the politics and culture of the modern United States. She is Associate Professor of History at The New School. Petrzela is also a history communicator who frequently writes pieces about American history in popular media outlets, co-hosts the Past Present podcast, and has created or been featured in educational videos for The History Channel and C-SPAN.

== Education and positions ==
Petrzela is of Jewish and Argentine descent. She attended Columbia University, graduating with a BA degree in history in 2000. She began to work as an investment banking analyst, and then in 2001 she became a Spanish teacher at a public school in New York City. After a year, she attended graduate school at Stanford University, where she obtained an MA in history in 2004 and a PhD in history in 2009. After graduating in 2009, she joined the history faculty at The New School.

== Research ==
In 2015, Petrzela published the book Classroom Wars: Language, Sex, and the Making of Modern Political Culture. In Classroom Wars, Petrzela studies the controversies over the inclusion of sex education and Spanish language bilingual education in California schools from the mid-1960s through the 1980s. She connects these issues to the popular sentiment against property tax in California and the state's rightward trend during the 1970s, culminating in the passage of the 1978 California Proposition 13. Classroom Wars is divided into two sections, with the first detailing the fight over sex education and the second devoted to the fight over Spanish language education, and employs primary sources that include newspapers, lesson plans, school board minutes, and course evaluations. Within each section, the book is largely structured as a chronology of the fight over these educational topics, but also includes micro-history analyses in California communities including Anaheim, San Francisco, San Jose, and San Mateo. Classroom Wars was particularly noted for combining two subjects that might appear to be dissimilar, namely sex education and Spanish language education, in contrast to the large proportion of the scholarship on American education in the 1960s and 1970s that has been characterised as focusing narrowly on major individual topics in the context of school desegregation with less attention to how those topics interact with each other. Classroom Wars was published in a paperback edition in 2017.

Petrezela's second book is Fit Nation: How America Embraced Exercise as the Government Abandoned It (2023).

== Public communication ==
Petrzela has engaged in substantial public communication about topics in American history. Since 2015, Petrzela has hosted the weekly podcast Past Present with the historians Nicole Hemmer and Neil J. Young, which discusses recent events in American politics in the context of American political history. She was the creator and presenter of The History Channel's 2018 webseries, "The Unlikely History of Everyday Things".

Petrzela regularly contributes pieces to media outlets including The Atlantic, The New York Times, and The Washington Post. She is frequently interviewed and quoted in media outlets including The New York Times, GloboNews, El Mundo, and the BBC. Petrzela was featured in the C-SPAN Lectures in history series.

Petrzela is also involved in fitness and athletics companies, both in the workout company intenSati and as a co-founder of HealthClass2.0.

She is the host of the podcast series Welcome to Your Fantasy, about the history of Chippendales.

At the American Historical Association's 2025 meeting, Petrzela spoke against a resolution condemning Israel's military action in Gaza. She said the resolution suggested that academics were "on board with a pretty left-wing view of the Gaza war" and if the resolution passes, "that's really bad for us".

She is very vocal about her dislike of outdoor dining sheds in New York City and has been a frequent critic against them.
