= Wind of Change (podcast) =

Podcast by Pineapple Street Studios

Wind of Change is a podcast documentary that debuted on May 11, 2020. It was hosted by Patrick Radden Keefe and co-produced by Pineapple Street Media, Crooked Media, and Spotify.

== Background ==
The podcast is hosted by Patrick Radden Keefe and co-produced by Pineapple Street Media, Crooked Media, and Spotify. The show is composed of 8 episodes. The series is over 6 hours long. The research for his recent book Say Nothing had been gruelling, and Radden Keefe was looking for a change, so he turned to a rumor he had heard a decade earlier from a friend in the intelligence community. The podcast focuses on the rumor that the Scorpions song "Wind of Change" was written by the CIA.

The podcast discusses similar instances of the CIA using music such as the jazz ambassadors tour where Louis Armstrong visited the Congo. Similarly, the CIA front organization called the American Society of African Culture sent Nina Simone on tour in Nigeria in 1961.

The show followed Radden Keefe as he travels to Washington DC, Kiev, St Petersburg, Ohio, Moscow, Florida, and Hanover to interview various people including Klaus Meine. Klaus Meine denies that the CIA was involved in the creation of the song. Radden Keefe also interviews Doc McGhee, who was a band manager involved in drug smuggling. The series discusses how music was often distributed via samizdat cassettes in the USSR.

Radden Keefe hinted at the possibility of a season 2.

== Reception ==
The show reached the top 10 podcasts in the United States and Australia when it debuted on May 11, 2020. Nicholas Quah wrote in Vulture that the show was a "really enjoyable listen" if a little "meandering at times". Eoghan O’Sullivan criticized the show in the Irish Examiner, calling it a "bloated damp squib".

=== Awards ===
Award	Date	Category	Result	Ref.
Webby Awards	2021	Podcasts: Documentary (Limited-Series & Specials)	Won	
Webby Awards	2021	Podcasts: Best Limited Series 2021	Won	
Ambies	2021	Best Podcast Host	Won	
Ambies	2021	Best Reporting	Won	
Ambies	2021	Best Scriptwriting, Nonfiction	Won	
Ambies	2021	Best Production and Sound Design	Nominated	
iHeartRadio Podcast Awards	2021	2020 iHeartRadio Podcast Awards Winners	Nominated	
Discover Pods Awards	2020	Society & Culture Podcast	Nominated	

== Adaptations ==
The series was optioned by Hulu for a television series.
