= Bonnie Nettles =

American religious leader (1927–1985)

- Nettles in 1974
- Born: Bonnie Lu Trousdale; August 29, 1927; Houston, Texas, U.S.
- Died: June 19, 1985 (aged 57); Dallas, Texas, U.S.
- Other names: Ti, Peep, Pig, Shelly West
- Occupation: Registered nurse
- Known for: Co-leader of Heaven's Gate
- Spouse: Joseph Segal Nettles (m. 1949; div. 1973)
- Children: 4

Bonnie Lu Nettles (née Trousdale; August 29, 1927 – June 19, 1985), later known as Ti (/tiː/; TEE), was an American religious leader and nurse who was co-founder and co-leader along with Marshall Applewhite of the Heaven's Gate new religious movement. Nettles died of melanoma metastatic to the liver in 1985 in Dallas, Texas, twelve years before the group's mass suicide in March 1997.

== Early life ==
Bonnie Nettles was born on August 29, 1927, and raised in Houston, Texas, into a Baptist family. As an adult, she moved away from the religion. After becoming a registered nurse, she married businessman Joseph Segal Nettles in December 1949, with whom she had four children. Their marriage remained mostly stable until 1972, at which time, according to The New York Times, she began attempting to contact deceased spirits by conducting regular seances and came to believe that a 19th-century monk named Brother Francis frequently spoke with her and gave her instructions. She also visited multiple fortunetellers who told her that she was soon to meet a mysterious man who was tall with light hair and a fair complexion, descriptions which were fairly close to Marshall Applewhite's appearance. Nettles also studied astrology, Theosophy, and the occult.

== Introduction to Applewhite ==
Nettles met Marshall Applewhite in March 1972, though where they met is uncertain. In his writings, Applewhite claimed to have been "visiting a hospitalized friend when Mrs. Nettles entered the room and their eyes locked in a shared recognition of esoteric secrets." However, Applewhite's writings were prone to hyperbole or relaying everything as some occurrence of fate. Terrie Nettles, Bonnie's daughter, worked at a theater where Applewhite produced weekend children's shows and taught in an in-house drama school. She has stated that "someone got hurt at the drama school in the theater that Herff [Applewhite] worked at. Herff accompanied the injured person to the hospital where he met Bonnie." Joe Nettles, one of Bonnie's sons, was not entirely sure how they met or whether their first meeting was at the theater.

Nettles agreed to perform an astrological reading for Applewhite. They had an almost instantaneous "spiritual" connection; Applewhite decided that Nettles was "to be the sage, he the speaker." They left together on New Year's Day of 1973. Nettles's three youngest children were left to remain with their father, while her oldest daughter, Terrie, then aged 20 and skeptical of her mother's ideas, fended for herself. Nettles and Applewhite established Heaven's Gate together as equals, with Nettles running the group and Applewhite speaking for her. Nettles claimed to have communicated with aliens about the Next Level and told Applewhite to tell their followers. In 1976, Applewhite recognized Nettles as higher up on the level of command than he was.

== Death ==
Many events passed in creation of the Heaven's Gate group and the formation of its core members, with Nettles continuing to act as the interpreter of signs and the mystic of the group. In 1983, she had to have an eye removed due to cancer, and her doctor informed her that the disease was already spreading through the rest of her body. Nettles stated that the doctor was ignorant and believed, along with Applewhite, that she could not die, as they had to ascend together. The cancer continued to worsen, moving to her liver. Nettles died on June 19, 1985, at Parkland Memorial Hospital in Dallas, Texas. While there as a patient, she used the pseudonym Shelly West.

Applewhite convinced the rest of the group that Nettles's "broken-down vehicle was left behind". He had her body cremated and her ashes were then spread upon a lake somewhere in Texas. Applewhite explained to the group that Nettles had left because her work was done on this level but that he himself still had more that he had to do. Applewhite also said that Nettles would continue to help them from the Next Level.

Scholars have viewed the death of Nettles as a key turning point in the history of Heaven's Gate, as it caused the theology to shift from a belief that they would physically ascend to heaven while alive aboard a UFO to viewing the body as merely a "vehicle" for the soul which would be discarded upon entering heaven, which would culminate in the group's mass suicide in 1997.

== Nicknames ==
Applewhite and Nettles went by the collective of "The Two", as well as the singular names "Bo" and "Peep" respectively and later "Do" and "Ti", along with "Guinea" and "Pig" at some points in time.
