= The Line (podcast) =

2021 podcast by Dan Taberski

Cast and voices
- Hosted by: Dan Taberski

Related
- Preceded by: Running From Cops
- Followed by: 9/12

The Line is a podcast hosted by Dan Taberski and produced by Apple TV+ and Jigsaw Productions.

== Background ==
The podcast is hosted by Dan Taberski and produced by Apple TV+ and Jigsaw Productions. The podcast was a six-episode series that debuted on April 6, 2021, and the final episode was released on May 4, 2021. A four episode television adaption was released later that fall. The show discusses Eddie Gallagher and the war crime trial. The podcast focuses on interviews with people connected to the trial while a large part of the podcast is framed as a courtroom drama. Laura Jane Standley and Eric McQuade praised the show in The Atlantic calling it a "riveting account" that is "[s]teeped in the netherworld of elite combat troops." Jake Greenberg criticized the podcast in Podcast Review calling it "American hero worship" that lacked any political perspective and neglected to identify the Iraq War as both illegal and simply wrong. Brendan Francis Newnam of Pushkin Industries commented on the podcast saying that "there was nothing easy about the people he talked to and the story he covered." The show won a Alfred I. duPont Award in 2022.
