= Surviving Y2K =

2018 podcast by Dan Taberski

Cast and voices
- Hosted by: Dan Taberski

Related
- Preceded by: Missing Richard Simmons
- Followed by: Running From Cops

Surviving Y2K is a podcast hosted by Dan Taberski and produced by Pineapple Street Media and Topic Studios.

== Background ==
The podcast is a six episode documentary that premiered on November 13, 2018. The podcast is hosted by Dan Taberski and produced by Pineapple Street Media and Topic Studios. The show is the second in a set of anthologies by Taberski called Headlong—Missing Richard Simmons is the first. The podcast focuses on the hysteria caused by the Year 2000 problem. The podcast discusses Taberski's own life changing events that occurred that new year. Nicholas Quah of Vulture described the show as "[f]unny, poetic, and wonderfully written."
