= Welcome to Your Fantasy =

True crime podcast

Welcome to Your Fantasy is a true crime podcast about the Chippendales dance troupe. It was produced by Pineapple Street Studios and Gimlet Media and hosted by Natalia Petrzela.

== Background ==
The show is a true crime podcast that follows the rise of the Chippendales. It is a Spotify exclusive podcast that premiered in an eight-episode series that debuted on February 10, 2021. The podcast was produced by Pineapple Street Studios and Gimlet Media. The host of the podcast, Natalia Petrzela is an associate professor of history and an author. Petrzela interviews friends and coworkers of the Chippendales in the podcast. The show includes an interview with Candace Mayeron, the former producer of the Chippendales. The series has an Instagram account for visuals.

The Hulu television series Welcome to Chippendales allegedly plagiarised the podcast. Some episodes of the podcast were sent to Kumail Nanjiani to see if he was interested in working on a television adaption, but he responded that he was not interested in optioning the show. The podcast was then released and the show was optioned by Netflix, but shortly after Hulu announced that a series about the Chippendales would be released with Nanjiani playing the lead role. As a result, Netflix cancelled their adaption of the podcast.

Rachel Syme wrote in The New Yoker that Natalia Petrzela's "research and reporting place what might seem like a tacky, tabloidish subject in its full, fascinating cultural context". In The Times James Marriott gave the podcast five out of five stars writing that it is "a masterpiece of character study ... [and] an exploration of the nature of female sexuality".
