= Golden Globe Award for Best Podcast =

Podcast award

- Awarded for: Excellence in podcasting
- Location: United States
- Presented by: Golden Globe Foundation
- Currently held by: Good Hang with Amy Poehler (2025)
- Website: Golden Globes

The Golden Globe Award for Best Podcast was first awarded in 2026 by the Golden Globe Foundation. It recognizes "the extraordinary and diverse talents in podcasting".

== History ==
The nominees were chosen from a list of 25 most-listened-to podcasts "that have made a significant impact over the past year, celebrating the creativity and influence of creators worldwide," the Golden Globes announced on May 7, 2025. The Top 25 list for eligibility was determined by direct data from top podcast platforms, such as Apple, Spotify and YouTube, among others; the list of podcasts eligible for submission was revealed on October 2, 2025.

The decision for the new category, however, ignited debate and controversy among creators and the industry. After the nominations were announced, controversy diminished once it was known that right-wing conservative podcasters were shut out completely, and mostly comedy stars, such as Will Arnett, Jason Bateman, Amy Poehler and Dax Shepard, as well as podcaster Alex Cooper, were nominated for their respective podcasts. (Note: Attributed to multiple references:)

Helen Hoehne, president of the Golden Globes, said that the original list of 25, which was compiled by Luminate, reflects the "depth, diversity, and creativity thriving in the podcasting world today" and the Globes are "proud" to be the "first major entertainment award to recognize this medium".

== Winners and nominees ==
=== 2020s ===
Year	Title	Podcaster(s)	Platform	Ref.
2025 (83rd)	Good Hang with Amy Poehler	Amy Poehler	Spotify	
2025 (83rd)	Armchair Expert with Dax Shepard	Dax Shepard	Wondery	
2025 (83rd)	Call Her Daddy	Alex Cooper	SiriusXM	
2025 (83rd)	The Mel Robbins Podcast	Mel Robbins	SiriusXM	
2025 (83rd)	SmartLess	Jason Bateman, Will Arnett, and Sean Hayes	SiriusXM	
2025 (83rd)	Up First	Leila Fadel, Steve Inskeep, Michel Martin, A Martínez, Scott Simon, and Ayesha Rascoe	NPR	

== Platforms with multiple nominations ==
3 nominations

- SiriusXM

== See also ==
- Podcast Awards
- iHeartRadio Podcast Awards
- Pulitzer Prize for Audio Reporting
