= Snap Judgment (radio program) =

Radio program and podcast

- Genre: Radio documentary
- Running time: 1 hour
- Country of origin: United States
- Language: English
- Syndicates: Public Radio Exchange
- Hosted by: Snap Judgment Studios
- Starring: Glynn Washington
- Created by: Glynn Washington
- Executive producer: Mark Ristich
- Edited by: Anna Sussman
- Original release: July 2010
- Website: snapjudgment.org
- Podcast: itunes.apple.com/us/podcast/id283657561c

Snap Judgment is a weekly storytelling radio program and podcast, produced in Oakland, California and distributed by Public Radio Exchange, created by Glynn Washington and Mark Ristich, and hosted by Glynn Washington.

Guests have included comedian Dhaya Lakshminarayanan, Antwan Williams, Alison Becker, Ise Lyfe and Earlonne Woods. Each episode is made up of narrative pieces on a common theme. The program first aired in July 2010. As of November 2017, the podcast was downloaded approximately 2 million times per month, and the program is broadcast across more than 450 radio stations nationwide.

== History ==
In 2008, Glynn Washington won the Public Radio Talent Quest, a talent contest staged by Public Radio Exchange and Corporation for Public Broadcasting. Glynn later secured a grant from the Corporation for Public Broadcasting that provided initial seed funding to launch Snap Judgment as a radio and podcast program in 2010.

From 2015 through 2020 Snap Judgment was distributed by WNYC. From 2020 to 2021, the program was broadcast in Canada on CBC Radio One. Snap Judgment is currently distributed by PRX.

In 2017, Snap Judgment Studios launched its first spinoff program, "Snap Judgment Presents 'Spooked'". Spooked immediately leapt the charts to become one of Podtrac's "Top Ten New Podcasts of the Year" and reached the Number One spot on Apple Podcasts. Glynn hosted and helped produce the "Heaven's Gate" podcast with Pineapple Street Media, which also went to Number One on Apple Podcasts. In April 2023, Spooked became a weekly podcast, and later that year Spooked LIVE performed sold out shows in both Los Angeles and Oakland.

In 2022 Glynn Washington and Mark Ristich were inducted into the Podcast Hall of Fame.

In August 2023, KQED acquired Snap Judgment Studios KQED.

On October 26, 2023, the production employees of Snap Judgment voted overwhelmingly to be represented by NABET-CWA Local 51.
