= The Clearing (podcast) =

True crime podcast

- Official art for The Clearing
- Genre: True crime

Cast and voices
- Narrated by: Josh Dean

Music
- Ending theme: Modafinil Blues by Matthew Dear

Production
- Production: Pineapple Street Media; Gimlet Media

Publication
- No. of seasons: 1
- No. of episodes: 8
- Original release: 18 July – 29 August 2019

Related
- Website: gimletmedia.com/shows/the-clearing

The Clearing is a 2019 true crime podcast about April Balascio, daughter of American serial killer Edward Wayne Edwards. It premiered on 18 July 2019 and is a production of Pineapple Street Media and Gimlet Media.

== Synopsis ==
In 2009, April began to suspect her father of the 1980 murder of Tim Hack and Kelly Drew. Following her report to the police, Edwards was arrested and confessed to several other murders. He later became the subject of conspiracy theories accusing him of involvement in famous unsolved crimes. Featuring interviews from April and private recordings made by Edwards while he was living, The Clearing discusses April's journey to discover the truth about her father's life.

== Background ==
In 1980, teenagers Tim Hack and Kelly Drew were murdered in Wisconsin. In 2009, April Balascio saw a news article about the murders and became suspicious that her father, Edward Wayne Edwards, was involved; she called in a tip to the police. In 2010, Edwards (then 77 years old) was sentenced to life in prison for the murders. After his arrest, Edwards pled guilty to three more murders, including that of his foster son. Edwards died in prison in 2011.

Several years after Edwards died, veteran journalist Josh Dean reached out to Balascio. Dean was investigating conspiracy theories which tied Edwards to the deaths of several other high-profile crime victims, such as JonBenét Ramsey and Laci Peterson. He knew that these conspiracies were untrue, but he suspected that Edwards was involved in other killings. April suspected her father of more murders and was frustrated with the media for focusing on famous cases instead of cases which she believed he actually could have committed. Balascio and Dean became friends and began to investigate her father's life and crimes.

== Episodes ==
No.	Title	Original release date	Prod. code
1	"Hunting Season"	18 July 2019	TBA
April sees a news story and connects her father to a cold case.
2	"Creepy John Wayne"	18 July 2019	TBA
April discusses growing up as the daughter of Ed Edwards.
3	"Give Me the Needle"	25 July 2019	TBA
This episode includes recorded discussions from Edwards in which he seeks the death penalty for his own crimes.
4	"Bullshit Bullshit Bullshit"	1 August 2019	TBA
April confronts a conspiracy theorist who accuses Ed Edwards of being the mastermind behind many famous cold cases.
5	"A Lot of Old Memories"	8 August 2019	TBA
April and Josh examine other cold cases with potential connections to Edwards.
6	"Give Yourself Up Son"	15 August 2019	TBA
Josh Dean examines the murder of Dannie Boy Edwards, the adopted son whom Ed Edwards killed for life insurance money.
7	"He's In the Water"	22 August 2019	TBA
April meets with the family of a murder victim and discusses whether or not her father could have been the perpetrator.
8	"Tie a Knot In It"	29 August 2019	TBA
The episode opens with a recorded speech by Edwards in which he professes to be a reformed man, discusses his criminal past, and the explains the meaning of the word "love". April meets with the father and stepmother of Tim Hack, who was murdered by Edwards in 1980.

== Reception ==
Miranda Sawyer of The Guardian called The Clearing "an immense achievement", comparing it positively to shows such as Serial. Sawyer stated that Balascio's emotional articulacy provided the show with authenticity. Additionally, Sawyer noted that the show is "not like the movies", because it focuses on the difficulties of solving cold cases in the face of police lack of interest. The review praised the podcast's discussions of the mythologization of serial killers, as well as the trauma for family members of victims of unsolved murders.

Some true crime podcasts have been accused of exploiting the families of crime victims for fame. However, EJ Dickson of Rolling Stone found that Balascio's involvement with The Clearing's production elevated the show. The review also stated that The Clearing critiques other true crime podcasts by setting out to debunk rumors about Edwards, in contrast to shows which may promote theories not based on evidence.

Nicholas Quah of Vulture found that the use of Edwards' personal tapes helped to focus the show on Edwards as a human being, pushing past the "conventional elements of standard true-crime fare".

The first episode of the podcast won "Podcast Episode of the Year" at the 2019 Adweek Podcast Awards.

== Notes ==
Although Ed Edwards never legally adopted Dannie, Dannie changed his last name to Edwards and called him "dad".
