= Glynn Washington =

American media personality and producer

- Born: 1970 (age 55–56); Detroit, Michigan, U.S.
- Education: Grand Valley State University; University of Michigan (BA); University of Michigan Law School (JD)
- Occupations: Media personality, radio producer, podcaster
- Employer: Public Radio Exchange (PRX)
- Known for: Snap Judgment

Glynn Washington (born 1970) is a media personality and producer. He is the host, creator and executive producer of Snap Judgment, a radio / podcast/ stage / television show distributed by PRX.

Snap Judgment was recently recognized by Time Magazine as one of the Best 100 Podcasts Of All Time.

== Early life and education ==
Washington was born in Detroit, Michigan, in 1970. He and his family moved to a farm in rural Michigan. He was raised in the apocalyptic religious cult the Worldwide Church of God (now called Grace Communion International).

Washington studied at Grand Valley State University, the Japan Center For Michigan Universities in Hikone, Japan, and received a bachelor's degree in political science and Asian studies from the University of Michigan in 1992. In 1996 he received his Juris Doctor from the University of Michigan Law School.

== Career ==
Washington won the Public Radio Talent Quest sponsored by Public Radio Exchange (PRX) and the Corporation for Public Broadcasting (CPB), which had more than 1,400 entries. Shortly after winning, he and longtime creative partner Mark Ristich developed the Snap Judgment radio program, which first aired on NPR stations nationwide in July 2010. Snap Judgment now airs weekly on over 450 public radio stations and is downloaded over one million times each month.

Inspired by his own experience growing up in an apocalyptic cult, in 2018 Washington joined forces with Pineapple Street Studios to create the popular Heaven's Gate podcast -- which later became the basis of HBO Max's docuseries Heaven's Gate: The Cult of Cults.

Inspired by Snap Judgment's popular annual Halloween specials, in 2017 Washington launched the Snap Judgment spinoff podcast, Spooked. The program quickly soared to the top of the podcast charts and was named one of the “Top 10 New Podcasts of 2017” by Podtrac.

Washington stated that the response to Spooked reflected audience interest in stories about the unknown. He described the series as focused on real-life ghost stories and encounters that encourage listeners to question unexplained experiences.

Adding to the "Snap Judgment LIVE" touring show roster, Washington and Ristich recently expanded the Spooked universe with the acclaimed "Spooked LIVE" stageshow, and plans a multi-city run in 2025.

In 2023, Washington's Snap Studios was acquired by public media powerhouse KQED in San Francisco. Snap Studios has since launched a string of podcast hits including "Mind Your Own With Lupita Nyong'o" (lauded by the New York Times as one of the Best Ten Podcasts of 2024), and "Fire Escape", hosted by veteran Snap Judgment producer Anna Susssman and named as one of Mashable's 20 Best Podcasts of 2024.

Snap Judgment's "A Tiny Plot" (hosted by Shaina Sheely) was lauded by The New Yorker Magazine as one the best podcasts of 2025.

From 2007 until 2010 Washington was the Director of Young Entrepreneurs at Haas (YEAH), a Center within University of California, Berkeley's Haas School of Business.
