= Dan Taberski =

American writer, director, and producer

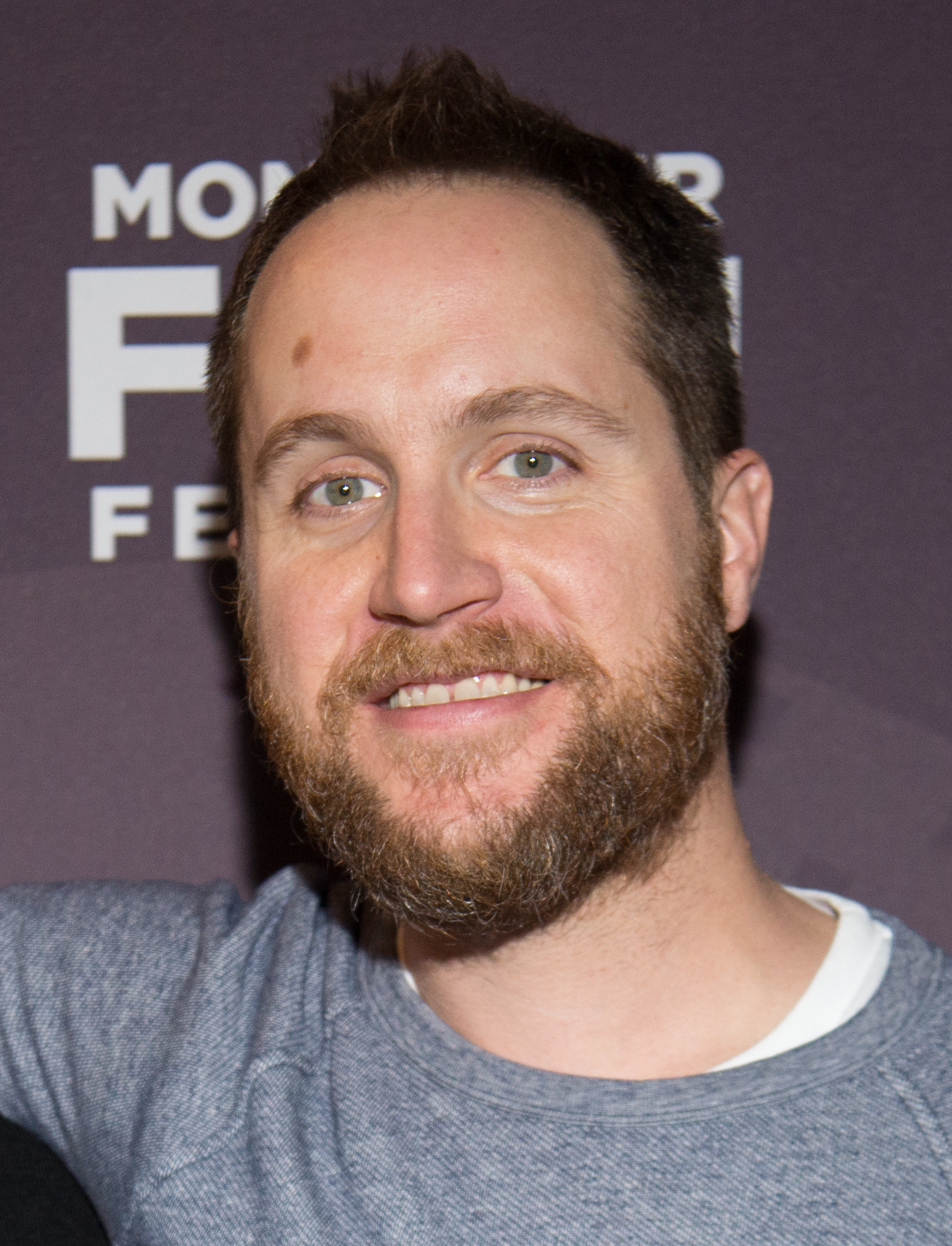
Taberski in 2016

Dan Taberski is a writer, director, and producer based in New York City. He is best known for hosting investigative journalism podcasts Missing Richard Simmons, Surviving Y2K, Running From Cops, 9/12, The Line, and Hysterical.

Taberski is also known for creating reality show Destroy Build Destroy on Cartoon Network and directing the 2016 documentary short film These C*cksucking Tears. He is a former producer for The Daily Show with Jon Stewart. He also worked on economic policy in the White House during the Clinton administration.

== Career ==
Taberski was the executive producer of the CNBC show called The Filthy Rich Guide.

=== Missing Richard Simmons ===
Taberski hosted Missing Richard Simmons, a six-part podcast series that was produced by Stitcher and Topic Studios and released in 2017. The podcast explored the personal impact that Richard Simmons had on people throughout his 30-year career. The show focuses on Simmon's exercise classes called Slimmons and features interviews with a variety of people who had connections with Simmons. The podcast attempts to explain Simmons sudden retirement in 2014. The podcast was retroactively included as the first installment in Taberski's series of podcasts called Headlong.

=== Surviving Y2K ===
Surviving Y2K was the second podcast hosted by Taberski in his Headlong series. The podcast was another six-episode series produced by Pineapple Street Media and Topic Studios that was released in 2018. The podcast explored the Year 2000 problem and the various reactions that people had to the event. The show delves into Taberski's personal experience of the new years.

=== Running From Cops ===
In 2019, Taberski hosted the podcast called Running From Cops in which he explores the impact of the television program Cops. The podcast was again produced by Pineapple Street Media and Topic Studios and was the third and final installment in Taberski's Headlong anthology. The podcast focuses on how the television program inaccurately portrays policing and how the show has increased police recruitment and negatively impacted opinions of specific communities.

=== The Line ===
Taberski hosted the 2021 podcast titled The Line which was produced by Apple TV+ and Jigsaw Productions. The podcast was a six part series focused on a court case concerning Eddie Gallagher. Throughout the podcast Taberski interviews multiple people involved with the case. The podcast was later adapted into a four episode television series.

=== 9/12 ===
9/12 was hosted by Taberski and the podcast was produced by Pineapple Street Media, Wondery, and Amazon Music. The podcast was a seven-episode series that discussed the reactions people had to the September 11 attacks. The show explores seven different peoples' stories and how the event affected things like comedy. The show won podcast of the year at the 2022 Ambies Awards.

=== Heaven's Gate ===
Dan Taberski was the writer for the podcast Heaven's Gate.
