= Heaven's Gate: The Cult of Cults =

2020 American documentary miniseries

- Genre: Documentary
- Directed by: Clay Tweel
- Music by: David Wingo
- Country of origin: United States
- Original language: English
- No. of seasons: 1
- No. of episodes: 4

Production
- Executive producers: Clay Tweel; Ross Dinerstein; Shannon Riggs; Amy Entelis; Lyle Gamm; Chris Bannon; Eric Spiegelman; Peter Clowney; Erik Diehn
- Producer: Mark McCune
- Cinematography: Jeff Powers; Hilary Spera
- Editors: Michelle M. Witten; James Leche; Giacomo Ambrosini
- Running time: 49-52 minutes
- Production companies: CNN Original Studios; Campfire; Stitcher

Original release
- Network: HBO Max
- Release: December 3, 2020

Heaven's Gate: The Cult of Cults is an American documentary television miniseries revolving around the religious group Heaven's Gate and its leader Marshall Applewhite. It consists of four episodes and premiered on December 3, 2020, on HBO Max.

== Synopsis ==
Told through the eyes of former members and loved ones of former members, the series follows Heaven's Gate and its leader Marshall Applewhite. The series included never-before-seen footage of the cult.

== Episodes ==
No.	Title	Directed by	Original release date
1	"The Awakening"	Clay Tweel	December 3, 2020
Marshall Applewhite teaches his followers in Waldport, Oregon that the bodies of his followers can be transformed into perfected space aliens. This was called the "Next Level." Reza Aslan characterizes Heaven's Gate as a millenarian group. Chariots of the Gods? had gained much publicity in the 1960s.
2	"The Chrysalis"	Clay Tweel	December 3, 2020
3	"The Second Harvest"	Clay Tweel	December 3, 2020
4	"The Exit"	Clay Tweel	December 3, 2020

== Production ==
In October 2019, it was announced HBO Max had greenlit a 4-part documentary series following the Heaven's Gate with Clay Tweel set to direct and executive produce with CNN Original Studios and Stitcher set to produce the series.

== Reception ==
On Rotten Tomatoes, the series holds an approval rating of 86%. On Metacritic, the series has a weighted average score of 67 out of 100, based on 4 critics, indicating "generally favorable reviews".

== See also ==
- Waco - 2018 miniseries about the 1993 Waco siege involving the Branch Davidians and their leader David Koresh
