= Missing Richard Simmons =

Investigative journalism podcast

- Genre: Investigative journalism; Serialized audio narrative
- Language: English

Production
- Production: Dan Taberski; Henry Molofsky
- Length: 27–33 minutes

Technical specifications
- Audio format: Podcast (via streaming or downloadable MP3)

Publication
- No. of seasons: 1
- No. of episodes: 6 (+2 "Bonus" episodes)
- Original release: February 15 – March 20, 2017

Related
- Followed by: Surviving Y2K
- Website: Missing Richard Simons

Missing Richard Simmons is an investigative journalism podcast hosted by journalist Dan Taberski and created by Stitcher, First Look Media and Pineapple Street Media. The six-episode series ran from February 15, 2017 through March 20, 2017, with episodes released every week.

== Synopsis ==
Missing Richard Simmons focuses on the sudden retirement from public life of the fitness instructor and actor Richard Simmons. After having an illustrious media career spanning over 30 years, and known for interacting with fans on a personal level, Simmons disappeared from the public eye in February 2014. Not only did Simmons no longer appear in the media, he also stopped teaching his regular exercise classes at his gym – Slimmons – and stopped corresponding with his friends and fans. Former producer on The Daily Show, Dan Taberski, sets out to find out why.

== Persons involved ==
- Dan Taberski – The host, a filmmaker and former Slimmons attendee
- Richard Simmons – Fitness instructor and actor, the focus of the podcast
- Teresa Reveles – Richard's housekeeper of over 30 years
- Mauro Oliveira – Richard's friend and former masseuse
- Lennie Simmons – Richard's brother
- Gerry "GG" Sinclair – A student and friend of Richard's for over 40 years

== Episodes ==
No.	Title		Original release date
I	"Where's Richard?"	28:03	February 15, 2017
On February 15, 2014 Richard Simmons didn’t show up to teach the exercise class he had led for 40 years. He hasn't been seen in public since. Filmmaker Dan Taberski starts investigating the disappearance of his friend.
II	"Stakeout"	31:43	February 22, 2017
Dan begins to explore the main theories about Richard’s disappearance. A lot of his friends think Richard may just be sitting in his house. So that's where the team go.
III	"The Maid and the Masseuse"	26:20	March 1, 2017
The two people closest to Richard at the time of his disappearance hate each other. Plus, Dan investigates possible claims of a hostage situation and explains what’s up with Richard’s (still very active) social media presence.
IV	""Till the Day I Die""	27:10	March 8, 2017
Dan heads to New Orleans, Richard’s hometown. From the food to the burlesque to the Southern religiosity, this city shaped young Dickie Simmons into the Richard that was so popular. It’s also where his brother lives. Dan tries to make contact.
V	"O Brother, Where Art Thou"	29:19	March 15, 2017
Dan talks to Lenny Simmons, Richard’s brother. Then he looks into some of the stranger, more personal aspects of being a Richard Simmons fan.
VI	"A Day at the Beach"	30:59	March 20, 2017
Dan says goodbye to Richard Simmons.

== Reception ==
Missing Richard Simmons was met with mixed reviews from critics. Amanda Hess of the New York Times described the podcast as "morally suspect", while also stating it was an invasion of Simmons' privacy. Similar sentiments were raised by Rolling Stone, The Week and Vox amongst others. Despite this however, these critics would also mention the "instantly engaging" nature of the podcast, with Vulture.com calling it "the strongest narrative podcast out there."

Missing Richard Simmons proved popular with audiences, topping the iTunes podcast charts in Australia, Canada, United Kingdom and United States. In the United States, the podcast spent almost three weeks in the number one spot.
