= Ambies =

- Previous: 5th Annual Ambies; March 31, 2025
- The Ambies logo
- Awarded for: Excellence in podcasting
- Country: United States
- Presented by: The Podcast Academy
- Formerly called: The Golden Mics
- First award: May 16, 2021; 5 years ago
- Website: ambies.com

The Ambies (or the Awards for Excellence in Audio) are awards for artistic and technical merit in the podcast industry. They are awarded by The Podcast Academy in two overall categories: Show Recognition and Talent Recognition. The winners, who receive a gold statue holding a microphone and wearing headphones, are selected by a vote from Podcast Academy members. The awards and the Podcast Academy were established in 2020 with the inaugural ceremony held on May 16, 2021, hosted by Cameron Esposito.

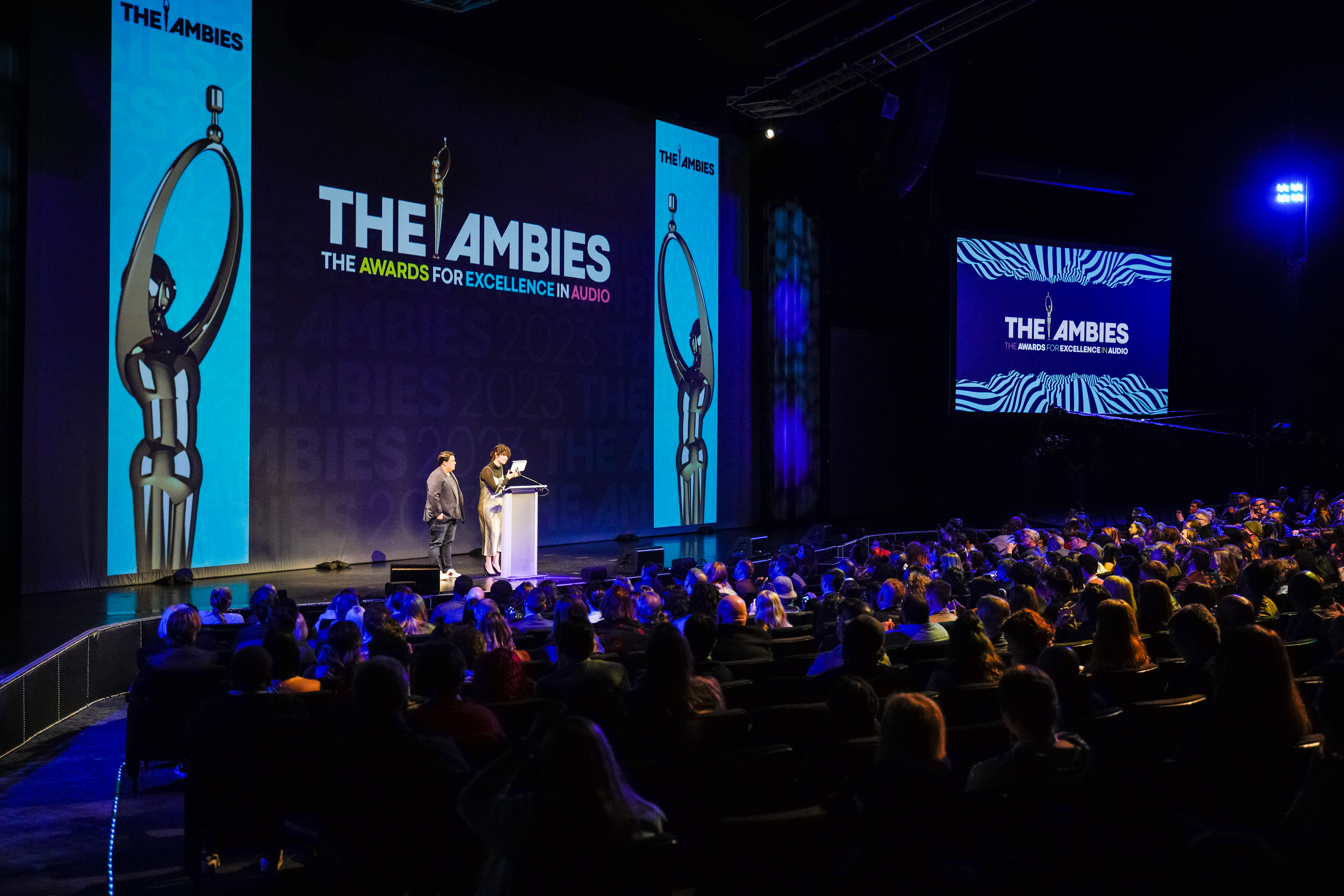
Third annual Ambies award ceremony

== History ==
In February 2020, Hernan Lopez at Wondery announced that he and 10 peers had established a new non-profit group called the Podcast Academy. The Podcast Academy is a member-based professional organization for podcasters. It was modeled after other similar institutions in the entertainment industry with the intention of establishing an independent industry award for podcasting, initially called the Golden Mics.

When the Podcast Academy announced plans to hold the first award ceremony amidst the awards season of other entertainment areas, the name was changed to the Awards for Excellence in Audio, nicknamed the Ambies, and award was revealed to be a gold statue holding a microphone and wearing headphones. The term Ambies was derived from ambient sound, which is frequently used in audio recordings, and it has a similar sound to other awards such as the Emmys and Grammys.

== Selection process ==
Nominations are first recommended for consideration within a submission window, and then narrowed down to an official list of nominees for voting. A minimum of three episodes published in the award year are required to be eligible for consideration. From those recommendations, a panel of Podcast Academy members listen to podcasts for a period of time before selecting the nominees for voting in each category. Members of the Podcast Academy are organized into peer groups in order to vote on the winners from the selected nominees, which are announced at the live ceremony.

== Statuette ==
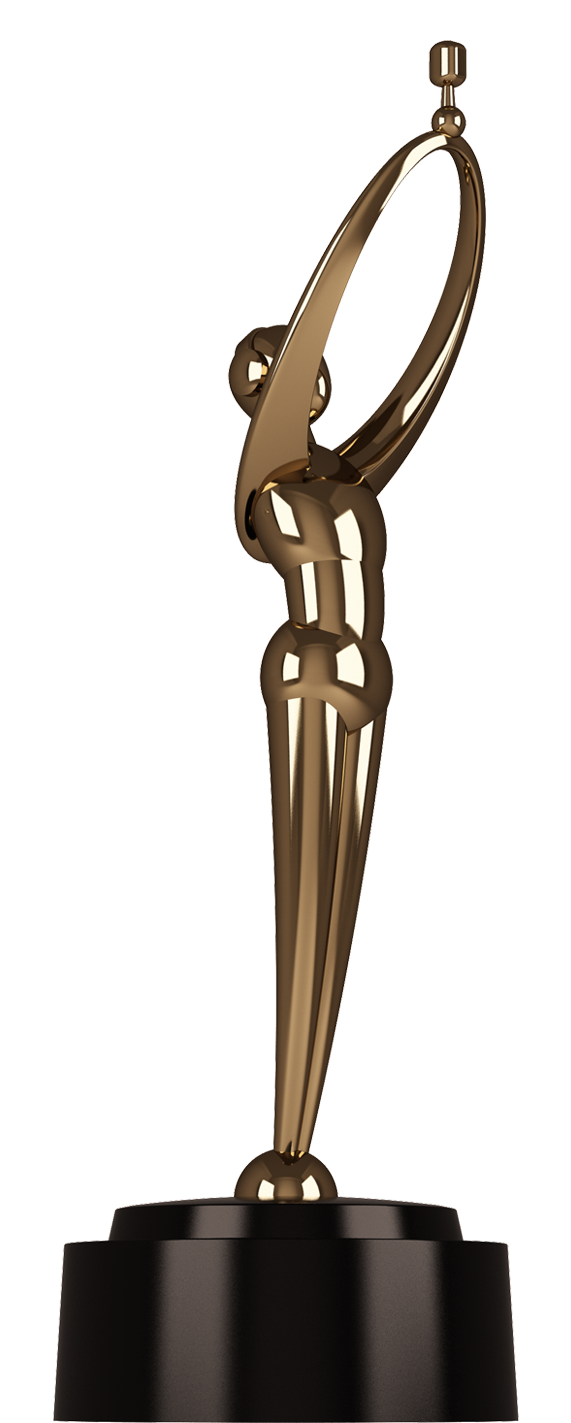
Ambie Statuette

The Ambie statuette is an art deco gold figurine wearing headphones and holding a microphone atop a black base. Its minimalist design is inspired by the Academy Award, in keeping with the Podcast Academy's vision of establishing the Ambies as the "Oscars of podcasting." The statuette is designed and produced by Cristaux International.

== 2021 Awards ==
The first annual Ambies occurred during the COVID-19 pandemic, and were conducted virtually. The ceremony was livestreamed on May 16, 2021, and was hosted by Cameron Esposito.

=== Podcasts ===
Podcast of the Year: Dying for Sex – (winner); Blockbuster: The Story of James Cameron; Bunga Bunga; Chasing Cosby; Detours; Dirty Diana; For Life: The Podcast; Forgotten: Women of Juarez; Say Their Name; The Happiness Lab	Best Documentary Podcast: I'm Not A Monster – (winner); California City; Conviction Season 2: American Panic; For Life: The Podcast; Louder Than a Riot; Painkiller: America's Fentanyl Crisis; The Edge: Houston Astros
Best Interview Podcast: Death, Sex & Money – (winner); A Winning Mindset: Lessons From The Paralympics; Asian Enough; Back from Broken; More With Anna Maria Tremonti; The Frontline Dispatch; Trafficked with Mariana van Zeller	Best Comedy Podcast: Conan O'Brien Needs A Friend – (winner); Culture Kings; Don't Ask Tig; Groceries; How Did This Get Made?; The Breakfast Club; Threedom
Best News Podcast: Today, Explained – (winner); Do No Harm; Post Reports; Suspicious Activity: Inside the FinCEN Files; The Journal; Vice News Reports; What Next	Best Sports Podcast: Whistleblower – (winner); 17 Weeks; Drafted; Sports Uncovered; The Cam Chronicles; The Edge: Houston Astros; The Lead
Best True Crime Podcast: Dr. Death Season 2: Dr. Fata – (winner); Brainwashed/Uncover; Chasing Cosby; I'm Not A Monster; Somebody; Supernatural with Ashley Flowers; The Messenger	Best Business Podcast: The Heist – (winner); An Arm and a Leg; Brought to You by...; Go For Broke; Masters of Scale; Teamistry; Women at Work
Best Fiction Podcast: Blood Ties – Season 2 – (winner); Asking For It; Dem Times; Dirty Diana; Frozen Frights: Aurora Borealis “Vacant”; The Left Right Game; The Two Princes	Best History Podcast: Driving the Green Book – (winner); American History Tellers; American Scandal; Detours; Slow Burn; Unfinished: Deep South; Very Presidential with Ashley Flowers
Best Knowledge, Science or Tech Podcast: Short Wave – (winner); American Innovations; Brave New Planet; How to Save a Planet; In Machines We Trust; Tai Asks Why; Unlocking Bryson's Brain	Best Society and Culture Podcast: Code Switch – (winner); Ear Hustle; Heavyweight; Into America; Latino USA; Resistance; You and Me Both with Hillary Clinton
Best Politics or Opinion Podcast: Gaining Ground: The New Georgia – (winner); Burn the Boats; Our Nation of Immigrants; Politically Re-Active; The Dan Bongino Show; The NPR Politics Podcast; Winning Wisconsin	Best Entertainment Podcast: Even the Rich – (winner); Dissect; For Life: The Podcast; Office Ladies; Prime Video Presents; The First One; The Plot Thickens
Best Personal Growth/Spirituality Podcast: On Being with Krista Tippett – (winner); Borne the Battle; Dare to Lead with Brené Brown; Dear Therapists; Hey Spirit!; Meditative Story; Stay Calm with Bob Roth	Best Wellness or Relationships Podcast: Therapy for Black Girls – (winner); Adult ISH; Dying for Sex; Last Day Season 2; The Happiness Lab; We Got You; Where Should We Begin?

=== Podcasters and Talent ===
Best Podcast Host: Wind of Change – Patrick Radden Keefe – (winner); Amicus Presents: The Class of RBG – Dahlia Lithwick; Back Issue – Josh Gwynn, Tracy Clayton; Bunga Bunga – Whitney Cummings; Mobituaries: Anna May Wong (Death of a Trailblazer) – Mo Rocca; Revisionist History – Malcolm Gladwell; Science Vs – Wendy Zukerman	Best Reporting: Wind of Change – Patrick Radden Keefe – (winner); Fiasco: Iran-Contra – Leon Neyfakh; I'm Not A Monster – Josh Baker; Planet Money – Sarah Gonzalez, Kenny Malone, Jacob Goldstein, Robert Smith, Amanda Aroncyzk, Karen Duffin, Mary Childs; Reveal – Shoshana Walter, Laura Starecheski, Ike Srikandarajah; The Take – Malika Bilal, Stefanie Dekker, Safwat al-Kahlout; Unfinished: Short Creek – Sarah Ventre, Ash Sanders
Best Scriptwriting, Fiction: Dirty Diana – Shana Feste, Jen Besser – (winner); Appearances – Sharon Mashihi; Dem Times – Rhys Reed-Johnson, Jacob Roberts-Mensah; Looking For Latoya – Amy Aniobi, Chris Sanford, Kindsey Young; Make It Up As We Go – David Hudgins, Brooks Hudgins; National Geographic Kids Greeking Out – Kenny Curtis, Jillian Hughes, Emily Everhart; The Left Right Game – Jack Anderson	Best Scriptwriting, Nonfiction: Wind of Change – Patrick Radden Keefe – (winner); And Nothing Less – Robin Linn; Heavyweight – Jonathan Goldstein, Kalila Holt, Stevie Lane; Masters of Scale – WaitWhat Team, Adam Skuse, Katie Clark Gray; Resistance – Saidu Tejan-Thomas Jr.; Suspicious Activity: Inside the FinCEN Files – Jonathan Menjivar, Jenelle Pifer, Joel Lovell; Whistleblower – Tim Livingston
Best Production and Sound Design: The Left Right Game – Ryan Walsh, Matt Yocum, Will Files, Ryan Sullivan – (winner); Canary: The Washington Post Investigates – Bishop Sand; Conviction: American Panic – Matthew Boll; Dirty Diana – Millie Iatrou, Ryan Walsh, Katie Halliday, Justin Davey, Matt Yocum & Ben Michev, Neely Oeftering; Unfinished: Short Creek – John DeLore; Where is George Gibney? – Ger McDonnell; Wind of Change – Henry Molofsky	Best Original Score and Music Supervision: Jacked: Rise of New Jack Sound – Marcelino Villalpando – (winner); Bunga Bunga – Scott Velasquez, Jeff Schmidt; Dead and Gone – Makeup And Vanity Set; Revisionist History – Luis Guerra; Throughline – Ramtin Arablouei, Drop Electric, Hania Rani; Treasure Island 2020 – Chris Tarry, Jennifer Rowekamp; The Two Princes – Score: Greg Laswell; Theme and additional scoring by Bobby Lord; Music Supervision: Jonathon Roberts
Best Performer in Audio Fiction: The Left Right Game – Tessa Thompson – (winner); Dust, Season 3: Chrysalis – Corey Hawkins; Hank the Cowdog – Matthew McConaughey; Light House – Aly Trasher; National Geographic Kids Greeking Out – Kenny Curtis, Tori Kerr; The Two Princes – Noah Galvin, Ari'el Stachel, Samira Wiley, Gideon Glick, Wesley Taylor, Alfredo Narciso, Mandi Masden, CJ Wilson, Michelle Gomez; We Are Not Alone – Willem Dafoe, Charlotte Gainsbourg	Governors Award: WTF with Marc Maron – Marc Maron, Brendan McDonald

== 2022 Awards ==
The second annual Ambies were held at the Mayan Theater in Los Angeles on May 22, 2022, and hosted by Ross Matthews and Nikki Boyer. The category "Best Indie Podcast" was also introduced, to recognize shows that were not commissioned by a major network or studio.

=== Podcasts ===
Podcast of the Year: 9/12 – (winner); A Slight Change of Plans; Alligator Candy; Believe Her; Bill Simmons Podcast; Earth Eclipsed; False Idol; Have You Heard George's Podcast?; Hooked; The Imperfection	Best Documentary Podcast: Stay Away From Matthew MaGill – (winner); AMERICAN VETERAN: Unforgettable Stories; CBC Podcasts: Life Jolt; Embedded; Fiasco: Benghazi; On Our Watch; Post Reports
Best Interview Podcast: 70 over 70 – (winner); Billie Was a Black Woman; I WEIGH; Jemele Hill is Unbothered; Profoundly Pointless; The Problem With Jon Stewart; Trafficked With Mariana van Zeller	Best Comedy Podcast: How Did This Get Made? – (winner); Best Friends; Nosy Neighbors; The Daily Show With Trevor Noah: Ears Edition; The Sarah Silverman Podcast; Wait Wait Don't Tell Me; Why Won't You Date Me With Nicole Byer
Best News Podcast: Up First – (winner); 60 Minutes; Consider This; Post Reports; Start Here; The Journal; The Times	Best Sports Podcast: Up First – (winner); 60 Minutes; Consider This; Post Reports; Start Here; The Journal; The Times
Best True Crime Podcast: Suspect – (winner); Believe Her; Confronting: Columbine; Criminal; Do You Know Mordechai?; Firebug; Over My Dead Body: Fox Lake	Best Business Podcast: Business Wars – (winner); An Arm and a Leg; Masters of Scale; Money Rehab with Nicole Lapin; Planet Money; The Indicator from Planet Money; The McKinsey Podcast
Best Fiction Podcast: Tejana – (winner); Black Box; Orphan Black: The Next Chapter; Princess of South Beach; The Miseducation of John Mark; The Zip Code Plays: Los Angeles; Treat	Best History Podcast: Slow Burn: The L.A. Riots – (winner); Black Cowboys; Human Resources; Making Gay History — The Podcast | Season 9: “Coming of Age During the AIDS Crisis”; Mogul; Telling Our Twisted Histories; Throughline
Best Knowledge, Science or Tech Podcast: Overheard at National Geographic – (winner); Dope Labs; Music Blocks; Road to Resilience; Ted Radio Hour; The Extortion Economy; Twenty Thousand Hertz	Best Society and Culture Podcast: Billie Was a Black Woman – (winner); Cheat!; Ear Hustle; Heavyweight; Higher Learning With Van Lathan and Rachel Lindsay; Into America; Storytime With Seth Rogen
Best Politics or Opinion Podcast: Billie Was a Black Woman – (winner); Can He Do That?; Pod Save the World; Post Reports; Skullduggery; Stay Tuned With Preet; The Messenger	Best Entertainment Podcast: Back Issue – (winner); Even the Rich; New Rory & MAL; Song Exploder; The Boys: The Official Podcast; The Friendship Onion; The Plot Thickens
Best Personal Growth/Spirituality Podcast: Life Kit – (winner); Great Grief; Making Space With Hoda Kotb; Meditative Story; Money Moves With Toni Tone; SOL Affirmations With Karega and Felicia; The Happiness Lab	Best Wellness or Relationships Podcast: On Purpose With Jay Shetty – (winner); Call Your Grandmother; Lovers and Friends With Shan Boodram; Making Space With Hoda Kotb; My Body, My Podcast; Really Good Shares; We Can Do Hard Things
Best Podcast for Kids: Music Blocks – (winner); African Folktales With Miss Jo Jo; Imagine This; Nice to Meet You; Operation Ouch! The Podcast of Everything; The Big Fib; The Vivo Songbook	Best Indie Podcast: An Arm and a Leg – (winner); AFTERSHOCK; Because I Said So!; Earth Eclipsed; FOR BLOOD OR JUSTICE; Walzon Prime; What Happened in Skinner

=== Podcasters and Talent ===
Best Podcast Host: It's Been a Minute With Sam Sanders – Sam Sanders – (winner); Crime Show – Emma Courtland; Human Resources – Moya Lothian-McLean; Jemele Hill Is Unbothered – Jemele Hill; King of The World: An American Muslim Story – Shahjehan Khan; Revisionist History – Malcolm Gladwell; Why Won't You Date Me With Nicole Byer – Nicole Byer	Best Reporting: 9/12 – (winner); Stolen: The Search for Jermain; Un(re)solved; The Turning: The Sisters Who Left; 544 Days; Believe Her; Post Reports
Best Scriptwriting, Fiction: Soft Voice – James Bloor – (winner); Edith! – Gonzalo Cordova, Travis Helwig; Hit Job – Broadway Video; The Burned Photo – Nicole Exposito, Jeremy Novick, Kwynn Perry; The Imperfection – Alexander Kemp; The Lamb – Tad Safran; We Stay Looking – Kindsey Young, Chris Sanford, Phylicia Mpasi	Best Scriptwriting, Nonfiction: Have You Heard George's Podcast? – George the Poet – (winner); Death at the Wing – Brian Steele, Adam Mckay, Raghu Manavalan, Jody Avigan; HiberNation – Mallika Rao; Radiotopia Presents: S***hole Country – Afia Kaakyire; Southlake – Antonia Hylton, Mike Hixenbaugh, Frannie Kelley, Reid Cherlin, Julie Shapiro, Michelle Garcia; Storytime with Seth Rogen – Seth Rogen, Richard Parks III, Frida Perez; Throughline – Rund Abdelfatah, Ramtin Arablouei, Julie Caine, Laine Kaplan-Levenson
Best Production and Sound Design: Billie Was a Black Woman – (winner); Can He Do That?; Pod Save the World; Post Reports; Skullduggery; Stay Tuned With Preet; The Messenger	Best Original Score and Music Supervision: 9/12 – (winner); Have You Heard George's Podcast?; The Duolingo French Podcast; Operation Midnight Climax; Carcerem; Great Grief; Gravity
Best Performer in Audio Fiction: Edith! – Rosamund Pike – (winner); Aftershock – David Harbour; Date With Daddy – Marisa Grant; Melon's House Party – Parvesh Cheena & Jessica McKenna; Passenger List – Kelly Marie Tran; Radio Rental – Rainn Wilson; We Stay Looking – Full Cast Including: Terri J. Vaughn, Karrueche Tran, Marsai Martin, Kandi Burruss, Amin Joseph, Desi Banks, Kyla Pratt, Jason Weaver, Kev On Stage, Kway, Karlous Miller, Tristen Winger, Max Greenfield and more.	Governors Award: Serial

== 2023 Awards ==
The third annual Ambies were held at the Westgate Las Vegas Resort on March 7, 2023, and hosted by Larry Wilmore.

=== Podcasts ===
Podcast of the Year: Chameleon: Wild Boys – (winner); Design Matters With Debbie Millman; Direct Deposit; Fiasco: The AIDS Crisis; Gay Pride & Prejudice; Moriarty; Pink Card; Reclaimed: The Story of Mamie Till-Mobley; The Outlaw Ocean Podcast; The Prince	Best Documentary Podcast: Bone Valley – (winner); Collapse: Disaster in Surfside; Finding Tamika; I Will Not Grow Old Here; Imperfect Paradise: The Forgotten Revolutionary; The Greatest Menace: Inside the Gay Prison Experiment; We Were Three
Best Interview Podcast: The Assignment With Audie Cornish – (winner); 9 to 5ish With theSkimm; Design Matters With Debbie Millman; Direct Deposit; Rethinking; The Lede; Why Is This Happening? The Chris Hayes Podcast	Best Comedy Podcast: Why Won't You Date Me? With Nicole Byer – (winner); Funny Cuz It's True; I Love a Lifetime Movie; Scam Goddess; Summer In Argyle; The Fckry With Leslie Jones and Lenny Marcus; Wait Wait...Don't Tell Me!
Best News Podcast: What Next – (winner); Collapse: Disaster in Surfside; Foundering: The Amazon Story; Imperfect Paradise: The Sheriff; Post Reports; Ukrainecast; Vice News Reports	Best Sports Podcast: The Lead – (winner); Choosing Sides: F1; Deep Left Field With Mike Wilner; Pink Card; Sports History This Week; The Longest Game; Torched
Best True Crime Podcast: Up and Vanished- The Trial of Ryan Duke – (winner); Conviction: The Disappearance of Nuseiba Hasan; Dateline: Missing in America; Death of an Artist; Queen of the Con; The Paddlefish Caviar Heist; Wrongful Conviction	Best Business Podcast: Business Wars – (winner); An Arm and a Leg; Lead Balloon – Public Relations, Marketing and Strategic Communications Stories; The Heist Season 2: The Wealth Vortex; The New Way We Work, featuring 4-part Ambition Diaries miniseries; What's Your Problem? With Jacob Goldstein; Work Check
Best Fiction Podcast: Last Known Position – (winner); Birds of Empire; Bone, Marry, Bury; Jane Anonymous; Moriarty; Newts!; The Big Lie	Best History Podcast: Slow Burn: Roe v. Wade – (winner); Against the Odds; Fiasco: The AIDS Crisis; History Daily; One Year: 1986; Reclaimed: The Story of Mamie Till-Mobley; Snafu With Ed Helms
Best Knowledge, Science or Tech Podcast: TED Radio Hour – (winner); Climate of Change; In Machines We Trust; IRL: Online Life Is Real Life; Threshold; Unexplainable; Why It Matters	Best Society and Culture Podcast: Ídolo: The Ballad of Chalino Sánchez – (winner); Fiasco: The AIDS Crisis; In Those Genes; Into America; Love Right Now; The Sum of Us; Truth Be Told
Best Politics or Opinion Podcast: Strict Scrutiny – (winner); Crossing the Line; It's Political With Althia Raj; Post Reports; Teaching Texas; The Prince; The State of: Women	Best Entertainment Podcast: Scamfluencers – (winner); Even the Rich; MUBI Podcast; Object of Sound; Pop Paranormal; Queue Points; Reality With The King
Best Personal Growth/Spirituality Podcast: A Slight Change of Plans – (winner); Allyship Is a Verb; Back From Broken; How God Works; How to Be a Better Human; In the Arena With Leah Smart; The Mel Robbins Podcast	Best Wellness or Relationships Podcast: Come as You Are – (winner); Are You Sleeping?; Back From Broken; Chiquis and Chill; Dear Headspace; Navigating Narcissism; Room 5
Best DIY Podcast: Queer News – (winner); Allyship Is a Verb; Poetry for All; Proud Stutter; Stitch Please; Teddy Goes to the USSR; They Knew Which Way to Run	Best Indie Podcast: Blind Landing – (winner); Ghosthoney's Dream Machine; Imaginary Worlds; In Those Genes; Inner West Icons; SOL Affirmations With Karega & Felicia; The Nocturnists
Best Podcast for Kids: Tai Asks Why – (winner); A Kids Book About: The Podcast; Forever Ago; Million Bazillion; Pinkalicious & Peterrific; Smash Boom Best; The Arthur Podcast	

=== Podcasters and Talent ===
Best Podcast Host: Leah Wright Rigueur – Reclaimed: The Story of Mamie Till-Mobley – (winner); Anderson Cooper – All There Is With Anderson Cooper; Casey Wilson – Fed Up; Chad Sanders – Direct Deposit; Gilbert King, Kelsey Decker – Bone Valley; Heather McGhee – The Sum of Us; JB Smoove – Funny My Way	Best Reporting: Bone Valley – Gilbert King, Kelsey Decker – (winner); Chameleon: Scam Likely – Yudhijit Bhattacharjee; Conviction: The Disappearance of Nuseiba Hasan – Habiba Nosheen; Taking on Putin – John Sweeney; The Greatest Menace: Inside the Gay Prison Experiment – Patrick Abboud; The Outlaw Ocean Podcast – Ian Urbina; Who Killed Daphne? – Stephen Grey
Best Scriptwriting, Fiction: I Hear Fear – Jenny Deiker Restivo, Nathalie Chicha – (winner); American Hostage – C.D. Carpenter; Impact Winter – Travis Beacham; Last Known Position – Luke Passmore; Power Trip – Mary Hamilton, Cara Horner; The End Up – Will Weggel, Danny Luber; Story Pirates – Minhdzuy Khorami, Mike Cabellon, Meghan O’Neill, Peter McNerney, Lee Overtree, Rachel Wenitsky, Ned Risele	Best Scriptwriting, Nonfiction: Ídolo: The Ballad of Chalino Sánchez – Erick Galindo, Alejandro Mendoza – (winner); 12 Years That Shook the World – Erin Harper; Chameleon: Wild Boys – Sam Mullins; Death of an Artist – Helen Molesworth; Into America – Trymaine Lee, Aisha Turner, Isabel Angell, Max Jacobs, Josh Sirotiak; MUBI Podcast – Rico Gagliano; We Were Three – Nancy Updike
Best Production and Sound Design: Twenty Thousand Hertz – Jai Berger – (winner); Batman: The Audio Adventures – Chris Gibney, Julie Larson; Birds of Empire – Randy Torres, Ben Milchev, Ryan Walsh, David Tatasciore, Gabe Burch; Cupid – Randy Torres, Ben Milchev, Ryan Walsh, David Tatasciore, Sarah Ma; Maejor Frequency – Richard Riegel; Marvel's Wastelanders: Doom – Mark Henry Phillips; The Big Burn – E. Scott Kelly	Best Original Score and Music Supervision: Disgraceland – Jake Brennan, Matt Beaudoin, Ryan Spraker, Bryce Kanzer – (winner); Culpable Podcast – Dirt Poor Robins, Dayton Cole; Fed Up – Scott Velasquez; Gay Pride & Prejudice – Chris Ryan, Jonathon Roberts, Liz Fulton; Kabul Falling – Arson Fahim; Last Known Position – Deron Johnson, David Levita; Spark & Fire – Ryan Holladay, Hil Jaeger
Best Performer in Audio Fiction: Borrasca (Season 2) – Cole Sprouse, Sarah Yarkin – (winner); #Matter – Amin Joseph; Dark Sanctum – Bethany Joy Lenz, Clive Standen, Michael O’Neill; Moriarty – Dominic Monaghan, Billy Boyd, Phil LaMarr, Lindsay Whisler; Outliers – Rory Culkin; The Madness of Chartrulean – Aud Andrews; Story Pirates – Cecily Strong, Eric Austin	Governors Award: Stuff You Should Know – Chuck Bryant, Josh Clark

== 2024 Awards ==
The fourth annual Ambies were held in Los Angeles on March 26, 2024, and hosted by Trixie Mattel.

=== Podcasts ===
Podcast of the Year: Slow Burn: Becoming Justice Thomas from Slate – (winner); 50 Years of Hip-Hop from KEXP; Can You Dig It?: A Hip-Hop Origin Story; Ghost Story; Embedded: Taking Cover from NPR; Exposed: Cover-Up at Columbia University from Wondery; Ghost Story from Wondery and Pineapple Street Studios; Next Year in Moscow from The Economist; Questlove Supreme from iHeartPodcasts; The Empty Grave of Comrade Bishop from the Washington Post; The Very Worst THing That Could Possibly Happen from Wolf At The Door	Best Documentary Podcast: Ghost Story – (winner); Borrowed and Banned; Embedded: Taking Cover; Fever: The Hunt for Covid's Origin; Free From Desire: Asexual in the City of Love; King Slime: The Prosecution of Young Thug and YSL; Show Burn: Becoming Justice Thomas
Best Interview Podcast: Wiser Than Me with Julia Louis-Dreyfus – (winner); Alexi Lalas' State of the Union Podcast; Apple News In Conversation; On Purpose with Jay Shetty; Questlove Supreme; The Skinny Confidential: Him & Her Podcast; Your Mama's Kitchen	Best Comedy Podcast: How Did This Get Made? – (winner); Bad Dates; Conan O’Brien Needs a Friend; Let's Make a Rom-Com; Lovett or Leave It; The Big Flop; Wait Wait... Don't Tell Me!
Best News Podcast: Today, Explained – (winner); Odd Lots; Queer News; Start Here; The Decibel; Tug of War: Israel-Hamas War; Up First	Best Sports Podcast: New Heights with Jason and Travis Kelce – (winner); All the Smoke; Four Years of Heat; Heart of the Game; Reclaimed: The Forgotten League; The Lead; The Playcallers
Best True Crime Podcast: The Girlfriends – (winner); Disappeared: The Bradley Sisters; Heinous – An Asian True Crime Podcast; Smoke Screen: Just Say You're Sorry; The Girl in the Blue Mustang; The Vanishing Point; Who Killed JFK?	Best Business Podcast: Spellcaster: The Fall of Sam Bankman-Fried – (winner); Behind the Money; Good Bad Billionaire; How I Built This Podcast with Guy Raz; Lever Time with David Sirota; Money Stuff; NerdWallet's Smart Money Podcast
Best Fiction Podcast: PREVIA: A Tech Heist – (winner); Dragon Age: Vows & Vengeance; Midnight Burger; People Who Knew Me; Possession; Supreme: The Battle for Roe; The Foxes of Hydesville	Best History Podcast: Unreformed: The Story of the Alabama Industrial School for Negro Children – (winner); Hindsight; History's Secret Heroes; Spy Valley: An Engineer's Nuclear Betrayal; The Africas vs. America; This is History: A Dynasty to Die For; Untextbooked
Best Knowledge, Science or Tech Podcast: Darknet Diaries – (winner); Decoder with Nilay Patel; In Machines We Trust; IRL: Online Life Is Real Life; Threshold; Unexplainable; Why It Matters	Best Society and Culture Podcast: Weight For It – (winner); Can You Dig It?: A Hip-Hop Origin Story with Chuck D; Dear Alana, Dynamite Doug; Exposed: Cover-Up at Columbia University; ROS Presents: Roughhousing; The Story Exchange
Best Politics or Opinion Podcast: The NPR Politics Podcast – (winner); Bad Watchdog; National Emergency; Next Year in Moscow; Post Reports; Those Who Can't Teach Anymore; We DOn't Talk About Leonard	Best Entertainment Podcast: 50 Years of Hip-Hop – (winner); Creative Control; Films to Be Buried With with Brett Goldstein; HBO's The Last of Us Podcast; Movies vs. Capitalism; MUBI Podcast; Women of Marvel
Best Personal Growth/Spirituality Podcast: Dear Alana, – (winner); Allyship Is a Verb; Back From Broken; How God Works; How to Be a Better Human; In the Arena With Leah Smart; The Mel Robbins Podcast	Best Wellness or Relationships Podcast: Embodied – (winner); Big Lash Energy; Chasing Life with Dr. Sanjay Gupta; It Can't Just Be Me; Jillian on Love; Life Kit; Love Letters
Best DIY Podcast: STITCH PLEASE – (winner); Allyship Is a Verb; Poetry for All; Proud Stutter; Stitch Please; Teddy Goes to the USSR; They Knew Which Way to Run	Best Indie Podcast: Weight For It – (winner); Abandoned: The All-American Ruins Podcast; BEEF with Bridget Todd; Dragoncast; Expectant; Surfing Corporate; The Nocturnists
Best Podcast for Kids: The Cat In The Hat Cast – (winner); A Kids Book About: The Podcast; Forever Ago; Million Bazillion; Pinkalicious & Peterrific; Smash Boom Best; The Arthur Podcast	

=== Podcasters and Talent ===
Best Podcast Host or Hosts: Martine Powers - The Empty Grave of Comrade Bishop (winner); Anderson Cooper – All There is with Anderson Cooper; Rachel Maddow and Isaac-Davy Aronson – Rachel Maddow Presents: Deja News; Malcom Gladwell – Revisionist History; Rose Reid and Nando Vila – Shoot the Messenger; Kerry Godliman – Stolen Hearts; David Rind – Tug of War: Israel-Hamas War	Best Scriptwriting, Nonfiction: B.A Parker – Code Switch (winner); Jonathan Menjivar - Classy with Jonathan Menjivar; Simon Kent Fung and Laurie Polisky - Dear Alana; Laura Beil - Exposed: Cover-Up at Columbia University; Jamie Tarabay and Shawn Wen - Foundering: The John McAfee Story; James Peak - The Banksy Story; David Hoffman - Who Killed JFK?
Best Scriptwriting, Fiction: PREVIA: A Tech Heist – (winner); Dragon Age: Vows & Vengeance; Possession; Supreme: The Battle for Roe; The Foxes of Hydesville; The Hollow	Best Production and Sound Design: Ramtin Arablouei, Rund Abdelfatah, Lawrence Wu, and Julie Caine – Throughline (winner); Garrett Tiedemann - Chameleon: Dr. Dante; Sarah Ma, Neely Oeftering, Geoffrey Cannock, Jose Varon, Ben Milchev, David Tatasciore - Evergreen; Ryan Sweikert and Campside Media - Long Shadow: Rise of the American Far Right; Martin Schulz - People Who Knew Me; Alex Kemp and Beau Milkis - The Very Worst Thing that Could Possibly Happen; Undertow: The Sister
Best Reporting: Unreformed: The Story of the Alabama Industrial School for Negro Children – (winner); Embedded: Taking Cover; Exposed: Cover-Up at Columbia University; Fever: The Hunt for Covid's Origin; Smoke Screen: Just Say You're Sorry; Spellcaster: The Fall of Sam Bankman-Fried; The 13th Step	Best Indie Production: Weight For It – (winner); Abandoned: The All-American Ruins Podcast; Allyship Is a Verb; Dragoncast; Expectant; Surfing Corporate; The Nocturnists

=== Special awards ===
- Governor's Award:
  **This American Life**
- Podcast Pioneer Award:
  **Kara Swisher**

== 2025 Awards ==
The fifth annual Ambies were held in Chicago on March 31, 2025, and hosted by Tig Notaro. The Podcast Academy also introduced the new category of "Best Spanish Language Narrative Podcast".

=== Podcasts ===
Podcast of the Year: Hysterical – (winner); 99% Invisible: Not Built For This; Beyond All Repair; Cement City; Dragon Age: Vows & Vengeance; Empire City: The Untold Origin Story of the NYPD; Faraway; Fire Escape; Hot White Heist 2; Throughline	Best Documentary Podcast: Tested – (winner); Extrasensory; Lost Patients; Silence in Sikeston; Snap Judgment; The Final War; Uganda's Hidden Rainbow
Best Interview Podcast: Thanks Dad with Ego Nwodim – (winner); American Masters: Creative Spark; Apple News In Conversation; Overlooked: Women's Health Can't Wait; The Assignment with Audie Cornish; The Integrated Schools Podcast; Tomorrow's Cure	Best Comedy Podcast: Las Culturistas with Matt Rogers and Bowen Yang – (winner); Conan O'Brien Needs a Friend; Hot White Heist 2; Scam Goddess; SmartLess; We’re Here to Help; Who Replaced Avril Lavigne? Joanne McNally Investigates
Best News Podcast: The Ten News – (winner); The Journal; The Take; Today, Explained; Trump's Trials; What Next; World Report	Best Sports Podcast: Broomgate – (winner); 30 for 30 Podcasts; Good Game with Sarah Spain; Pablo Torre Finds Out; Shadowball: The Rise of the Black Athlete; The Raven; The Rich Eisen Show
Best True Crime Podcast: Beyond All Repair – (winner); Fire Escape; Lords of Death; The Burden; The Official Jinx Podcast; Who Killed Jennifer Judd?; Wrongful Conviction	Best Business Podcast: How I Built This Podcast with Guy Raz – (winner); Good Bad Billionaire; Lever Time with David Sirota; Money Stuff; NerdWallet's Smart Money Podcast; Rapid Response; The Best Idea Yet
Best Fiction Podcast: Tales of Fists & Fireballs – (winner); Dragon Age: Vows & Vengeance; The Coldest Case The Past Has a Long Memory; The Justice; The Last City; The Seneschal: A Rebel Moon Story; Tom Slick: Mystery Hunter	Best History Podcast: Empire City: The Untold Origin Story of the NYPD – (winner); American Experience Presents: Joseph McCarthy; Don't Drink the Milk – The curious history of things; Hollywood Exiles; Into America: Uncounted Millions; Tested; Throughline
Best Knowledge, Science or Tech Podcast: 99% Invisible – (winner); Click Here; Climate Rising; Merging Into Life; Short Wave; The Wild with Chris Morgan; Unexplainable	Best Society and Culture Podcast: Inheriting – (winner); Hysterical; In Retrospect with Susie Banikarim and Jessica Bennett; Mind Your Own with Lupita Nyong’o; My Divo; Sixteenth Minute (of Fame); Weight For It
Best Politics or Opinion Podcast: The NPR Politics Podcast – (winner); Autocracy in America; Citizen Elon (by the Elon, Inc podcast); Master Plan; Vibe Check; Vibes Only; What Could Go Right?	Best Entertainment Podcast: The Wonder of Stevie – (winner); Infamous; Lemme Say This; Rattled & Shook; Scamfluencers; Split Screen: Kid Nation; The Road to Joni
Best Personal Growth/Spirituality Podcast: 10% Happier with Dan Harris – (winner); A Fine Mess; A Quiet Life in 7 Steps; A Slight Change of Plans; Anomalie; How God Works: The Science Behind Spirituality; The TMI Project Story Hour	Best Wellness or Relationships Podcast: Therapy for Black Girls – (winner); An Arm and a Leg; Overlooked: Women's Health Can't Wait; Silence in Sikeston; The Midlife Truth Project; Untold: The Retreat; Why Won't You Date Me? with Nicole Byer
Best DIY Podcast: abandoned: the All-American Ruins Podcast – (winner); Black Is America; Books & Boba; Everyday Trans Activism; Mind the Force; The B* Word; The Integrated Schools Podcast	Best Indie Podcast: What Happened in Skinner – (winner); Sightings; The Insurgence: Sheriffs; The Man Who Calculated Death; The Nightingale of Iran; The People's Recorder; The TMI Project Story Hour
Best Podcast for Kids: Wow in the World – (winner); Culture Kids; Grimm, Grimmer, Grimmest; Historical Records; Mysteries About True Histories; PJ Library Presents: Beyond the Bookcase; Skylar & Bones – Funny Stories For Kids	Best Spanish Language Narrative Podcast: HUMO: Murder and Silence in El Salvador – (winner); ¡No Vengan!; Greal: El Secreto de las Ocho Llaves; Hechos Reales; No quieren que sepas; Pantallas & Mentiras [Screens & Lies]; Pétrea

=== Podcasters and Talent ===
Best Podcast Host: Ronald Young Jr. – Weight For It – (winner); Diallo Riddle and Blake ‘LUXXURY’ Robin – One Song; Glennon Doyle, Abby Wambach and Amanda Doyle – We Can Do Hard Things; Jon Stewart – The Weekly Show with Jon Stewart; Rainn Wilson – Radio Rental; Sam Sanders – The Sam Sanders Show; Wesley Morris – The Wonder of Stevie	Best Reporting: Dan Taberski – Hysterical – (winner); Chenjerai Kumanyika – Empire City: The Untold Origin Story of the NYPD; Ken Bensinger and Jessica Garrison – Chameleon: The Michigan Plot; Leon Neyfakh and Arielle Pardes – Backfired: Attention Deficit; Madeleine Baran, Samara Freemark, Parker Yesko, Natalie Jablonski, Rehman Tungekar, and Namak Khoshnaw – In the Dark Season 3: The Killings in Haditha; Nicky Woolf – Fur & Loathing; Sarah Holder, Caleb Melby and Polly Mosendz – Big Take
Best Scriptwriting, Fiction: Academy – Myha’la – (winner); Don't Listen To This – Anthony Del Col; Faraway – Matthew Castellanos and Brett Melnick; Give Me Away – Mac Rogers; Incoming – David Singer and CK Pahlow; Money Gone – Ed Sellek; The Best Man's Ghostwriter – Matthew Starr	Best Scriptwriting, Nonfiction: Reveal – Ashley Cleek and Al Letson – (winner); Cement City – Erin Anderson, Jeanne Marie Laskas, and Michael Benoist; Fire Escape – Anna Sussman; Killer Psyche – Mary Celenza, Jayda Williams, Julie Berke, Ann Lew, Lisa Ammerman and Candice DeLong; Noble – Johnny Kaufman and Shaun Raviv; Radio Atlantic: Scripts – Ethan Brooks; Track Change – Liz Mak and James Boo
Best Production and Sound Design: Michelle Macklem – Girl v. Horse – (winner); Casandra Tinajero and Andrés Bahena – Nocturno: Tales From The Shadows; Jeremy S. Bloom – Hot White Heist 2; Kenny Kusiak and George Drabing Hicks – The Confessions of Anthony Raimondi; Realm – Narcosis; Sagafilm and Skybound Entertainment – Impact Winter Season 3; Ted Bonnitt – Hindsight: The Day Before	Best Original Score and Music Supervision: Dan Leone – Ripple – (winner); Daniel Lloyd-Evans, Louis Nanke-Mannell and Toby Matimong – Extrasensory; Deron Johnson – Dungeon Masters; Jonathan Pfarr, Carson Graham and Bobby Mota – Celebrity Pets; Peter Nashel, Ross Hopman, Gio Lobato, Dana Hom, Brad Fischer, Jordan Lieb, Lucas Villemur and Lindsay Dievert – Hammerless: A True Crime Podcast in a Fantasy World; Skyler Gerdeman, Martin Lynabel, Nicholas Alexander, Max O’Brien and Caroline Thornham – Kill List; Stro Elliot and Eric Gersen – Historical Records
Best Performer in Audio Fiction: Caitlin Stasey, Jake ‘The Snake’ Roberts, David Yow, Caroline Morahan, Guinevere Turner, Elizabeth Halpern, Travis Harmon, Brad Griffith, James Bacon, Jameson Cush, Jonathan Shockley and Ayla Glass – The Skies Are Watching – (winner); Bowen Yang, Cynthia Nixon, Shannon Woodward, Jane Lynch, Jesse James Keitel, Sarah Steele, Ian McKellen, Raúl Esparza, Sara Ramírez, Joel Kim Booster, Bianca Del Rio, Cheyenne Jackson, Abbi Jacobson, Stephanie Beatriz, Katya Zamolodchikova, Trixie Mattel, Yvie Oddly, Jane Krakowski, Sandra Oh, and Tony Kushner – Hot White Heist 2; Fredi Bernstein, Cody Wilkins and Dana Domenick – The Box; Mikki Hernandez, Toby Meuli, Geri-Nikol Love, Rachel Kylian – Ominous Thrill; Ruth Righi – Winnie Taylor's 4th & Inches; Sanaa Lathan – The Justice; Tisha Campbell – Snoriezzz	Governors Award: Ira Glass
Best Indie Podcast Host or Hosts: Dallas Taylor – Twenty Thousand Hertz – (winner); Deja Perkins and Purbita Saha – Bring Birds Back; Jill Jonassen – The Cost of Extremism; Kate McCoy and Kevin Corbett – Horrorwood: True Crime in Tinseltown; Lisa Phillips – From Now On; Lisa Woolfork – STITCH PLEASE; Susan Lambert Hatem and Sharon Johnson – 80s TV Ladies	Impact Award: Sam Sanders

== 2026 Awards ==
The sixth annual Ambies were held at the Arlo Williamsburg in Williamsburg, Brooklyn, New York, on February 24, 2026, as part of On Air Fest, and hosted by Wyatt Cenac. The ceremony was rescheduled from February 23 due to a blizzard. The Podcast Academy received a record number of submissions and introduced the Vanguard Podcaster of the Year award, first presented to Pablo Torre.

=== Podcasts ===
Podcast of the Year: Wisecrack – (winner); Call Her Daddy; Crime Junkie; Pablo Torre Finds Out; Pod Save America; Question Everything; Reveal; SmartLess; The Last Invention; The Mel Robbins Podcast	Best Documentary Podcast: The Con: Kaitlyn's Baby – (winner); 36 July: Uprising in Bangladesh; IVF Disrupted: The Kindbody Story; Latino USA; Not a Very Good Murderer; The Poppy Day Bomb; What Could Go Wrong?
Best Interview Podcast: Death, Sex & Money – (winner); All There Is with Anderson Cooper; Hasan Minhaj Doesn't Know; Lives Less Ordinary; On with Kara Swisher; The Oprah Podcast; We're Not Kidding with Mehdi & Friends	Best Comedy Podcast: Conan O'Brien Needs a Friend – (winner); Las Culturistas with Matt Rogers and Bowen Yang; Murder at the Patel Motel; SmartLess; The Bald and the Beautiful with Trixie and Katya; The Big Pitch with Jimmy Carr; Wisecrack
Best News & Politics Podcast: Reveal – (winner); Consider This; Face Off: The U.S. vs China; Long Shadow: Breaking the Internet; Pod Save America; Radio Atlantic; Vibe Check	Best Sports Podcast: Pablo Torre Finds Out – (winner); Chasing Basketball Heaven; Netflix Sports Club; New Heights with Jason & Travis Kelce; San Diego FC: Behind the Flow; Sports in America with David Greene; The Deal with Alex Rodriguez and Jason Kelly
Best True Crime Podcast: Sea of Lies – (winner); Aftermath: Hunt for the Anthrax Killer; Bone Valley, Season 2: Jeremy; Corruption Uncovered; Dirtbag Climber; Nobody Should Believe Me; Where Is Daniel Morcombe?	Best Business Podcast: The Indicator from Planet Money – (winner); Business Wars; Lead Balloon; Masters of Scale; Morning Brew Daily; NerdWallet's Smart Money Podcast; The Journal
Best Fiction Podcast: Red for Revolution – (winner); Murder on Mars; Purple Heart Warriors; Stanland; The Good Life; Two Thousand and Late; You Feeling This	Best History Podcast: Our Ancestors Were Messy – (winner); Aftermath: Hunt for the Anthrax Killer; Charlie's Place; Division Street Revisited; God's Banker; History This Week; Making Gay History: The Nazi Era
Best Knowledge, Science or Tech Podcast: Radiolab – (winner); Levittown; Long Shadow: Breaking the Internet; Shell Game; Short Wave; To Catch a Thief: China's Rise to Cyber Supremacy; We the Children – Kids Talk Climate Change	Best Society and Culture Podcast: Wisecrack – (winner); A Tiny Plot; Heat List; Model Wars; Suave: Season Two; The Stoop; Uncuffed
Best Entertainment Podcast: Twenty Thousand Hertz – (winner); Iconic Origins: Teenage Mutant Ninja Turtles; Reliving Single; Skip Intro; The Bop Bible; The Plot Thickens: Cleopatra; You'll Hear It	Best Personal Growth/Spirituality Podcast: Wild Card with Rachel Martin – (winner); How God Works: The Science Behind Spirituality; How To!; No Small Endeavor; The Mel Robbins Podcast; The Oprah Podcast; This Is Woman's Work
Best Wellness or Relationships Podcast: Embodied – (winner); A Zen Mind Guided Meditations; Extraordinary Conversations with Dr. Toby Campbell; Hack Your Body, Heal Your Mind; Joy Lab; Mental Health Rewritten; She MD	Best DIY Podcast: Redacted History – (winner); Abandoned: The All-American Ruins Podcast; Black Is America; Climate Shifted; Culture Kids; The Integrated Schools Podcast; Twice Displaced
Best Indie Podcast: Our Ancestors Were Messy – (winner); Debt Heads; Radio Diaries; Stitch Please; Taboo Science; The Fight of My Life: Escaping Scam City; Worst Club Ever (A Child Loss Podcast)	Best Podcast for Kids: Terrestrials – (winner); 'Tis the Grinch Holiday Podcast; DoGood Detectives; Folktales from Sudan; Grimm, Grimmer, Grimmest; Lightcatchers; Sesame Street: Cookie Monster Mysteries
Best Spanish Language Narrative Podcast: No Me Provoquen – (winner); El Árbol de la Vida; La Bala Mágica; La Segunda Muerte del Dios Punk; Punto Rojo, Punto Azul; Se Llamaba Como Yo (She Had My Name); Vivir y Morir en Gaza	Best Emerging Podcast: How Is This Better? – (winner); Crook County; Debt Heads; Lawless Planet; Raising Us; This Guy Sucked; This News Is So Gay
Best Ad Read: Conan O'Brien Needs a Friend (SiriusXM) – (winner); Begin Again with Davina (FlightStory); Reality Gays with Mattie and Poodle (Sissy That Talk Productions); Revisionist History (Pushkin Industries); The Weekly Show with Jon Stewart (Qcode; agency: ADOPTER Media; advertiser: Magic Spoon); We Need to Talk (FlightStory); Woo Woo with Rachel Dratch (Qcode; agency: ADOPTER Media; advertiser: Ollie)	Best Branded Podcast: Sesame Street: Cookie Monster Mysteries – (winner); MoneyWise; Oprah's Book Club: Presented by Starbucks; Things Bakers Know; Tomorrow's Cure; Traveling with AAA; What the Fraud?
Best Use of Video in a Podcast: Tales Unrolled – (winner); Antiques Roadshow Detours; Dark History; Peacemaker: The Official Podcast with James Gunn; The Rest Is History; The Jamie Kern Lima Show; The Wednesday Season 2 Official Woecast	Podcast Advertiser Innovator Award: Charlie's Place – (winner); My Favorite Murder; Not Gonna Lie with Kylie Kelce; Silver Linings with the Old Gays; The Adam Friedland Show; The Track Star Podcast; The Young Turks

=== Podcasters and Talent ===
Best Podcast Host or Hosts: Rachel Martin – Wild Card with Rachel Martin – (winner); Steve Burns – Alive with Steve Burns; Anderson Cooper – All There Is with Anderson Cooper; Steven Chua – Dirtbag Climber; Will Arnett, Sean Hayes, and Jason Bateman – SmartLess; Oprah Winfrey – The Oprah Podcast; Andrea Dunlop – Nobody Should Believe Me	Best Reporting: Robyn Semien – Question Everything – (winner); Donie O'Sullivan – CNN Presents: Persuadable; Nicolo Majnoni – Coal Survivor; T.J. Raphael – Liberty Lost; Hannah Levintova and Ashley Cleek – Reveal; Gregory Warner and Andy Mills – The Last Invention; Ian Urbina – The Outlaw Ocean
Best Scriptwriting, Fiction: Jana Naomi Smith – Red for Revolution – (winner); Rebecca Humphries – Becoming Meg Dashwood; Tommy O'Haver and Irene Turner – Lady Killer; Maulik Pancholy, Zackary Grady, et al. – Murder at the Patel Motel; Jeff Schmidt – Ominous Thrill; Brian Siegele – Sightings; Eric P. Sherman – The Strange Thing About...	Best Scriptwriting, Non-Fiction: Charles Forbes and Edd Hedges – Wisecrack – (winner); Jeremiah Crowell and Scott Tiffany – Aftermath: Hunt for the Anthrax Killer; Kyle Tekiela – Crook County; Erisa Apantaku, James Edwards, and Philippa Geering – Heat List; Shannon Burkett – LEAD How This Story Ends Is Up to Us; Ryan Sweikert and Garrett Graff – Long Shadow: Breaking the Internet; Ethan Brooks – No Easy Fix
Best Production and Sound Design: Alex Vespestad, Steven Perez, et al. – Wisecrack – (winner); John Perotti – Charlie's Place; Jonathon Roberts and Daniel Ramirez – DC High Volume: Batman; Chris Tarry – Ice Lions; Jude Brewer, Dan Rosato, et al. – Iconic Origins: Teenage Mutant Ninja Turtles; Shannon Burkett, Andy Kris, et al. – LEAD How This Story Ends Is Up to Us; Michael Kramer – Worst Club Ever (A Child Loss Podcast)	Best Original Score and Music Supervision: Sam Ewing and Marcus Bagala – DC High Volume: Batman – (winner); Bone Valley, Season 3: Graves County; Lulu's Late Night; Daniel Brunelle – Murder at the Patel Motel; Tangelene Bolton – Scam Factory; Oded Lev-Ari and Chris Tarry – The Left Arm Treasure Society; Sandro Morales-Santoro, Patrick Rodman, CAS, and Eric P. Sherman – The Strange Thing About...
Best Performance in Audio Fiction: Maulik Pancholy, Murray Bartlett, et al. – Murder at the Patel Motel – (winner); Shailene Woodley – Game of Nines; Kyle Prue, Mather Zickel, et al. – In Media Res; Sufyan Mahmud, Isaac Robinson-Smith, et al. – Invenios Expeditions; Merritt Wever, Alessandro Nivola, et al. – LEAD How This Story Ends Is Up to Us; Judd Michael Goodstein, Lauren Marcus, et al. – The Left Arm Treasure Society; Marisa Abela and Harris Dickinson – Pride and Prejudice	Best Indie Podcast Host or Hosts: Jamie Feldman and Rachel Webster – Debt Heads – (winner); Dusty Weis – Lead Balloon; Anna DeShawn – Queer News; Jamie Kern Lima – The Jamie Kern Lima Show; Zibby Owens – Totally Booked with Zibby; Maya Guice – White Water; Allie Kramer – Worst Club Ever (A Child Loss Podcast)

=== Special awards ===
- Governors Award: Kara Swisher
- Impact Award: Reggie Ossé (posthumous)
- Vanguard Podcaster of the Year: Pablo Torre
