= Aaron Blanton =

American producer and director

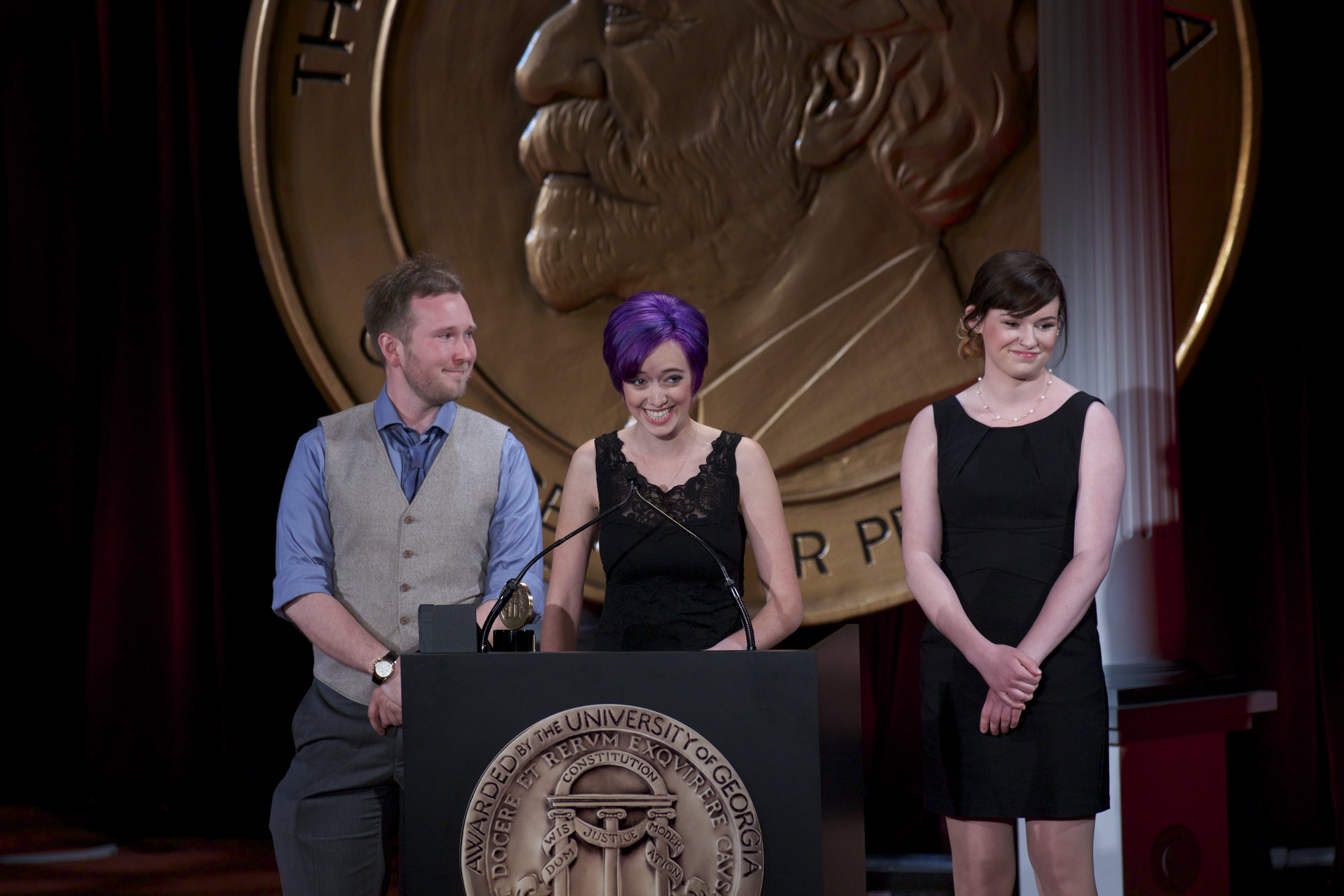
- Blanton at the 2013 Peabody Awards, with Samantha Stendal and Kelsey Jones
- Born: Eugene, Oregon, U.S.
- Education: University of Oregon
- Occupation: Producer • Director
- Awards: Peabody Award; Ambie Award; Telly Award; Signal Award

Aaron Blanton is an American producer and director. He is known for his 2013 anti-rape video A Needed Response, and his 2021 alternate reality game and fiction podcast What Happened in Skinner. His work has won awards and garnered tens of millions of views online.

== Early life and education ==
Blanton grew up in Eugene, Oregon, where he spent high school acting in and directing plays. He attended the University of Oregon, where he majored in cinema studies and journalism.

== Career ==
=== A Needed Response ===
While a student at the University of Oregon, Blanton co-produced the anti-rape PSA A Needed Response, which subsequently went viral after being featured on Upworthy. Blanton filmed the video in his living room with friend Samantha Stendal to express their frustration with CNN's coverage of the Steubenville High School rape case. The video quickly amassed over 10 million views on YouTube. In 2013, A Needed Response became the first viral video ever to win a Peabody Award, while Blanton and Stendal became two of its youngest ever winners.

=== What Happened in Skinner ===
In 2021, Blanton created the alternate reality game and fiction podcast What Happened in Skinner with co-showrunner Katrina Braun. The series gained attention for its innovative format and low-budget production. Its creators, a group of five friends, produced the show at home in their spare time, relying on virality instead of a marketing budget to bolster the show's success. Season 1 was nominated for Best Indie Podcast at the 2022 Ambie Awards. In 2025, Season 2 was again nominated, and subsequently won Best Indie Podcast. Season 2 was also honored with a Bronze Signal Award. The project also incorporated a short film and an alternate reality game.

=== Other Projects ===
Blanton was a cinematographer for the Oscar-nominated documentary The Hunting Ground, and the PBS series Poetry in America.

He is also a co-creator of The Ghoulish Sanctuary, an immersive Haunted Mansion-inspired vacation rental near Walt Disney World Resort.

== Recognition and awards ==
Blanton's work has gained tens of millions of views online, and he has earned a Peabody Award, a Telly Award, and an Ambie Award.
