= Vico Ortiz =

Puerto Rican actor (born 1991)

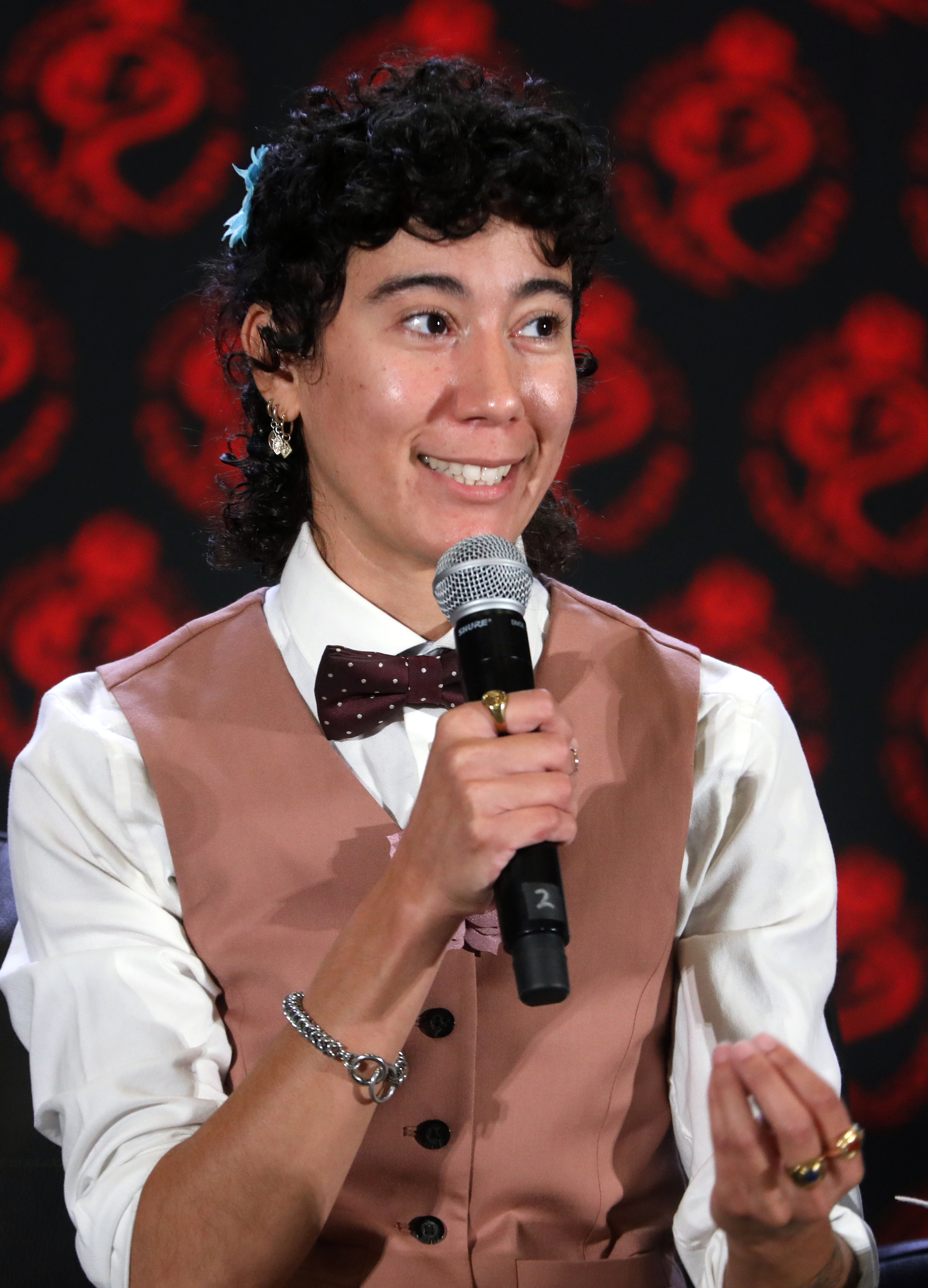
- Ortiz in 2024
- Born: October 10, 1991 (age 35); San Juan, Puerto Rico
- Education: American Academy of Dramatic Arts
- Occupation: Actor
- Years active: 2011–present

Vico Ortiz (born October 10, 1991) is a Puerto Rican actor, drag king, and activist. They are best known for portraying Jim Jimenez on the HBO Max television series Our Flag Means Death. Ortiz is a recipient of the Human Rights Campaign Visibility Award and the GLAAD Media Award.

== Early life and education ==
Vico Ortiz was born on October 10, 1991, in San Juan, Puerto Rico, where they were raised. They are fluent in Spanish and English; Spanish was the first language they learned.

Ortiz received their education at the American Academy of Dramatic Arts in Los Angeles.

== Career ==
=== 2011–2020 ===
Ortiz started their acting career in 2011 when they starred in the short film Oprah's Audience Moves On. For the following years, they had many small roles in other shorts and TV shows.

Around 2017–2018, Ortiz told their agent that they wanted to go for roles of all genders, whether non-binary like them, or not. When they were hired for non-queer roles, they started suggesting to the writers that their characters could be non-binary, and some shows accepted to make the change.

In 2018, they starred in the queer web series Recon, about a group of teenagers attending a secret spy school, as Ren St. Claire, one of the main characters. Later that year, they starred in two episodes of the TV show Vida.

In 2019, they starred in another queer web series titled These Thems, where they played Vero, a non-binary character befriending a 30-year old woman who had just come out. Ortiz also wrote the Spanish subtitles for the show.

=== 2021–present ===
In 2021, they had recurring roles in both The Sex Lives of College Girls and S.O.Z. Soldados o Zombies.

In 2022, they had their first main role in a television show, Our Flag Means Death. Ortiz plays a non-binary pirate in this queer comedy about the romantic relationship between Blackbeard and Stede Bonnet which quickly became a hit. Ortiz says that their interactions with fans have changed their life, and that they felt encouraged to get top surgery after seeing fan art of their character, Jim, getting gender-affirming surgery from the show's cook and de facto surgeon Roach (played by Samba Schutte).

In 2023, they had two recurring voice acting roles in the animated television show Adventure Time: Fionna and Cake. They voiced the supporting characters Hunter, Skater Y and Fern.

In 2024, Ortiz was a featured guest in the second season of the GLAAD digital series Dímelo. They also voiced a nonbinary companion character in The Elder Scrolls Online named Tanlorin.

In 2025, they had a recurring voice acting role on the Ambie-winning fiction podcast What Happened in Skinner. In 2025, they also performed a solo cabaret-style show called Rise of a King at FUERZAfest in New York City. As part of the True Color Fest 2026 in Puerto Rico, Ortiz debuted their solo show in Spanish at the Luis A. Ferré Performing Arts Center.

In 2026, Ortiz was a player in two actual play web series: Saddle Up and Age of Umbra: Sallowlands. They were also the narrator for the audiobook edition of the novel Cemetery Boys: Espíritu (2026). In November 2026, following a GLAAD report stating that the number of LGBTQ characters on television had "declined by 25% across broadcast, cable and streaming", Jason Lamphier of The Guardian wrote that "the limited amount of prospects beyond short films and smaller fare has forced Ortiz and their trans and non-binary peers to re-evaluate their options". Ortiz stated that "no one wants us any more, and that affects our healthcare"; however, Lamphier noted that "Ortiz remains hopeful about the future. While they're hustling like they never have before, leaning on smaller indie projects and audiobook narration and voice acting, they, like many of their trans and non-binary friends, have developed a healthier relationship with Hollywood".

== Personal life ==
Ortiz is non-binary. They use they/them pronouns in English and elle/le/e in Spanish. In an episode of the podcast Gender Reveal, they identified as genderfluid as well as non-binary, comparing their gender to a waterbed, "constantly moving, but in a fun way".

Ortiz performs as a drag king named "Vico Suave". Their character takes inspiration from both their Hispanic/Caribbean and American culture, as well as "men who are comfortable with their femininity", such as Ricky Martin, Marc Anthony and Bad Bunny. They have another drag king persona named AJ when performing with their boy band the Backstreet Butches. Ortiz's drag king career started when a friend convinced them to participate in a show before they even knew what drag was.

In July 2023, Ortiz revealed they are in a polyamorous relationship and shared photos of their partners.

Ortiz is an activist in subjects such as Puerto Rican federal voting rights, anti-racism, and gender neutrality in the Spanish language.

== Filmography ==
=== Television ===
Year	Title	Role	Notes
2014	Transparent	Cindy	1 episode
2015	The Fosters	Cole's buddy	1 episode
2017	Criminal Minds	Worker	1 episode
2018	Vida	Tasha	2 episodes
2019	American Horror Story	Rudy	1 episode
2020	Everything's Gonna Be Okay	Lyndsey	2 episodes
2021	S.O.Z. Soldados o Zombies	Sgt. Vicky Valencia	Recurring role
2021–2025	The Sex Lives of College Girls	Tova	8 episodes
2022–2023	Our Flag Means Death	Jim Jimenez	Main role
2023	Harley Quinn	Tefé Holland (voice)	3 episodes
2023	Adventure Time: Fionna and Cake	Hunter/Skater Y/Fern (voice)	
2025	King of Drag	Themself	Guest judge; 1 episode

=== Film ===
Year	Title	Role	Notes
2023	Craig Before the Creek	Serena (voice)	
2024	Spark	Dani	Main role; Film premiered at the Inside Out Toronto Film Festival

=== Podcast and web series ===
Year	Title	Role	Notes
2018	Recon	Ren St. Claire	Main role
2019	These Thems	Vero	Main role
2024	Dímelo	Themself	Featured guest
2024	Atlantis Rocks	Ben	Main role
2025	What Happened in Skinner	Dani Vázquez	Horror fiction podcast; recurring role
2026	The Bardic Hearth	D'Zarra	Audio drama; 2 episodes
2026	Saddle Up	Padre Orlando	Actual play; main role
2026	Age of Umbra: Sallowlands	Caguama	Actual play (Daggerheart system) limited series

=== Video games ===
Year	Title	Role	Notes
2022–2024	The Elder Scrolls Online	Frii, Tanlorin	

=== Stage ===
Year	Title	Role	Venue	Notes	Ref.
2025	Rise of a King	Themself	Jeffrey and Paula Gural Theatre (FUERZAfest)	Writer and performing artist	
2025	Rise of a King	Themself	Solo Theatre (Hollywood Fringe Festival)	Writer and performing artist	
2026	Rise of a King	Themself	Luis A. Ferré Performing Arts Center (True Color Fest)	Spanish debut	

=== Audio books ===
Year	Title	Role	Notes
2026	Cemetery Boys: Espíritu	Narrator	

== Accolades ==
Year	Award	Nominated work	Category	Result	Ref.
2021	The Queerties	These Thems	Performance in a Digital Series	Nominated	
2022	Gold Derby TV Award	Our Flag Means Death	Best Comedy Supporting Actor	Nominated	
2022	GLAAD Media Award	Primer Impacto (Univision)	Outstanding Spanish-Language TV Journalism	Won	
2022	The Queerties	Our Flag Means Death	Favorite TV Performance	Nominated	
2023	Audie Awards	Velorio	Spanish Language Title	Nominated	
2023	Peabody Awards	Our Flag Means Death	Entertainment	Nominated	
2024	Annie Awards	Craig Before the Creek	Outstanding Achievement for Voice Acting in an Animated Television/Media Production	Nominated	
2024	The Queerties	Our Flag Means Death	Favorite TV Performance	Runner-up	
2024	Autostraddle TV Awards	Our Flag Means Death	Outstanding Supporting or Guest Actor Playing an LGBTQ+ Character in a Sci-Fi/Fantasy Series	Nominated	
2024	Autostraddle TV Awards	Our Flag Means Death	Fan Favorite Out LGBTQ+ Actor	Won	

=== Other accolades ===
- Human Rights Campaign — Visibility Award (2022)
- Out — Out100 Honoree (2022)
- 29 Queer Film Festival — Coyote Courage Award (2024)
