= Jennifer Strong (journalist) =

American journalist and audio producer

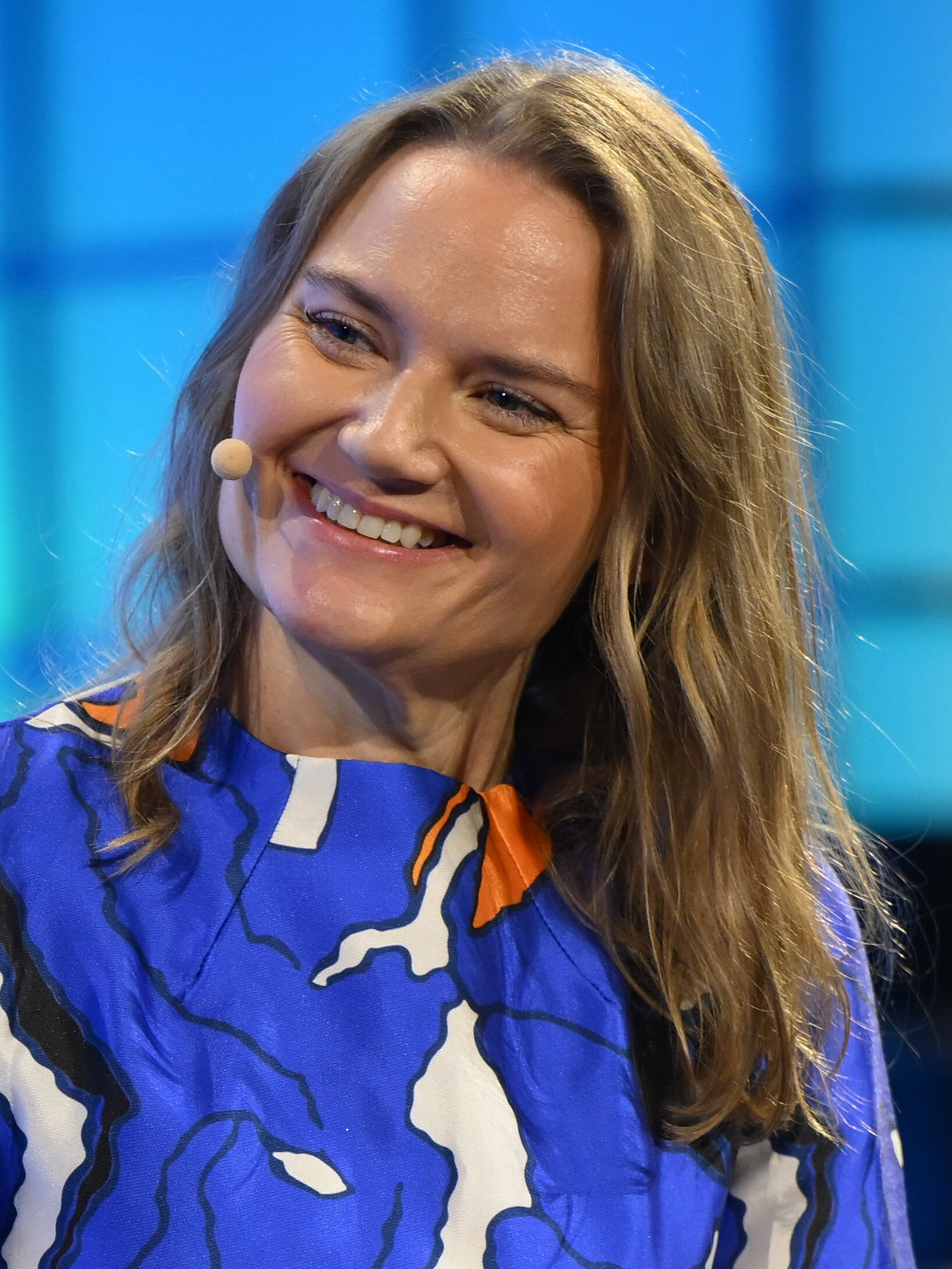
- Strong in 2025
- Born: 1978 (age 47–48); Saint Louis, Missouri
- Education: Gardner‑Webb University (B.A.), American University (M.A.)
- Occupations: Journalist, podcast producer
- Years active: 2000s–present
- Known for: Podcasts on technology and society
- Notable work: The Future of Everything, In Machines We Trust, SHIFT with Jennifer Strong
- Website: https://www.strongreporter.com/

Jennifer Strong is an American journalist and audio producer known for her work in public radio and technology journalism. Her work has included podcast production and long-form audio reporting on technology and society.

== Early life and career ==
Strong was born in New York City in 1978. She earned a Bachelor of Arts in Communication from Gardner–Webb University in Boiling Springs, North Carolina. She later received a Master of Arts in Journalism, with a specialization in international affairs, from American University in Washington, D.C.

Strong has worked in audio journalism, with a focus on technology, artificial intelligence, and the social impact of emerging technologies. She has held editorial and production roles at media organizations including The Wall Street Journal and MIT Technology Review.

At The Wall Street Journal, Strong created and hosted The Future of Everything, a podcast examining developments in science, technology, and innovation. She later served as editorial director for audio and live journalism at MIT Technology Review, where she worked on the development and production of technology-focused audio projects, including podcasts addressing artificial intelligence and automation.

Her work has also been distributed through public radio platforms such as Public Radio Exchange (PRX) and aired on National Public Radio (NPR) affiliates.

== Selected works ==
- The Future of Everything – podcast (The Wall Street Journal)
- In Machines We Trust – podcast (MIT Technology Review)
- SHIFT with Jennifer Strong – podcast distributed by PRX

Strong's work has received nominations and finalist selections from media industry organizations, including the Webby Awards and the Podcast Academy and has also participated as a speaker or moderator at journalism and technology conferences.
