= What Happened in Skinner =

Horror podcast

- Language: English

Creative team
- Created by: Aaron Blanton, Katrina Braun
- Written by: Season 1: Kaitlyn Gaskill; Annika Bennett; Aaron Blanton; Katrina Braun; Sam Morrison; Season 2: Aaron Blanton; Katrina Braun; Teddy Tenenbaum; Estelle Olivia; Chelsea Lutz

Cast and voices
- Starring: Season 1: Kayla Coleman; Rebecca Ana Peña; Ethan Crystal; Sam Z. Morrison; Season 2: Estelle Olivia; Rebekah Kennedy; Daniel Olson; Vico Ortiz; Evelyn Giovine; Jean Tafler; Justine Cotsonas; Joseph Dean Anderson; Leah Khambata

Production
- Length: 40-60 minutes

Publication
- No. of seasons: 2
- No. of episodes: 19

Related
- Website: whathappenedinskinner.com

What Happened in Skinner is an Ambie award-winning horror fiction podcast and alternate reality game created by Aaron Blanton and Katrina Braun. The story focuses on a mysterious occult religion called Auremana, and takes place on the fictional island of Skinner, Oregon.

== Skinner 1929 ==
In October 2021, several seemingly related creepypasta stories were posted on the NoSleep subreddit. Reddit users suspected the posts belonged to an alternate reality game (ARG), and began following the clues in the stories. They were led to a series of in-universe websites centered around a mysterious entity called Auremana, and an island called Skinner, Oregon.

The players, guided by a fictional user named Marlowe Verne, established a Discord server, working together to decode encrypted messages and seeking out physical clues dropped in Seattle, Los Angeles, and London.

On November 5, 2021, a short film called Skinner 1929, presented as an authentic livestream, streamed on YouTube. It featured two hosts, Greg Skinner and Susan Wylde, who played the disturbing contents of a 1920s home movie Greg had found in his nightstand. During a power outage, Susan, unaware that the stream was still broadcasting, confessed that the footage involved an occult religion called Auremana, and that she was one of its members. Shortly afterward, the two were violently attacked by an unknown assailant.

After Skinner 1929 streamed, Marlowe Verne revealed to the ARG players that she knew Susan and Greg. She announced that she was going to Skinner to investigate, and would record her experiences and present them online as a weekly podcast, recruiting the help of the ARG players along the way.

== Podcast (Season 1) ==
A 12-episode fiction podcast chronicling Marlowe's investigation debuted on November 9, 2021. It ran on a weekly release schedule until its season finale on January 27, 2022.

The podcast follows the true crime format, similar to other fiction podcasts such as Limetown. During the run of Season 1, the ARG continued alongside the podcast, with the real actions of the players depicted in the events of story.

== Podcast (Season 2) ==
A second season premiered on October 20, 2024. Set in New York City, it follows a new host, Cam, as they examine a recovered diary from the late 1800s in an attempt to solve a series of mysterious present-day deaths in the New York coven of Auremana.

Season 2 follows a dual narrative format, with one plot line following Cam's investigation, and the other dramatizing passages from the 1890s diary.

On March 31, 2025, Season 2 won the award for Best Indie Podcast at the 2025 Ambies. On October 15, 2025, it was announced that Season 2 had won a Bronze Signal Award.

== Production ==
The series gained attention for its innovative format and low-budget production. Its creators, a group of five friends, produced the show at home in their spare time, relying on virality instead of a marketing budget to bolster the show's success.

Skinner 1929 had played at several film festivals ahead of its online release, including the North Bend Film Festival and the H.P. Lovecraft Film Festival. It won the Director's Prize for Unique Concept & Execution at FilmQuest.

== Reception ==
The series has received a positive critical response. Skinner 1929 was one of the four films given the Director's Prize for "Unique Concept and Execution" at FilmQuest. One reviewer at the North Bend Film Festival wrote: "It recalls radio dramas of the midcentury period -- something to watch on a dark and stormy night. Fans of folk horror will go crazy for this one..." Another said of the film: "Genuinely creepy, this is the perfect marriage of old and new media to achieve a fascinating and impactful result."

Season 1 was nominated for Best Indie Podcast at the 2022 Ambie Awards. On March 29, 2022, the podcast reached #16 on Apple's US fiction charts.

Season 2 was again nominated for Best Indie Podcast, which it subsequently won.

The series has also developed a small cult following. According to The Hollywood Reporter, fans held an online memorial honoring the death of a minor character.
