= An Arm and a Leg =

An Arm And A Leg is a podcast which focuses on the cost of healthcare in the United States. It is hosted by Dan Weissmann and is produced in partnership with KFF Health News and KUOW.

The podcast was nominated at the 2022 Ambies for Best Business Podcast and Best Indie Podcast. At the 2023 Ambies, it was nominated for Best Business Podcast. At the 2025 Ambies, it was nominated for best Best Wellness or Relationships Podcast.
