= Spark (2024 film) =

2024 film directed by Nicholas Giuricich

- Directed by: Nicholas Giuricich
- Written by: Nicholas Giuricich
- Produced by: Nicholas Giuricich; Jackson Giuricich; Lesley Lopez
- Starring: Theo Germaine; Vico Ortiz; Danell Leyva; Christina Villa; Abigail Achiri
- Cinematography: Tamiah Bantum; Mathew Young
- Edited by: Nicholas Giuricich; Peter Frintrup
- Music by: Maxton Waller
- Production companies: Berlin 7; Rekon Productions
- Release dates: May 24, 2024 (Inside Out Film and Video Festival); June 10, 2025 (North America)
- Running time: 89 minutes
- Country: United States
- Language: English

Spark is a 2024 American romantic thriller film written and directed by Nicholas Giuricich on his feature film debut. The film stars Theo Germaine, Vico Ortiz, and Danell Leyva.

== Plot ==
Aaron, a transmasculine illustrator, meets a handsome man named Trevor at a party. After they have sex, Aaron becomes trapped in a time loop, reliving the day he met Trevor over and over again. His initial eagerness to learn more about Trevor becomes unsettling as Aaron suspects Trevor actually knows about the time loop too. Aaron then becomes focused on who Trevor is, and what he is trying to do to him.

== Cast ==
- Theo Germaine as Aaron
- Vico Ortiz as Dani
- Danell Leyva as Trevor
- Christina Villa as Veronique
- Abigail Achiri as Shannon
- Jason Caceres as Franco
- Nancy Nave as Terra

== Production ==
Spark was directed, written, and produced by Nicholas Giuricich, with additional producers Jackson Giuricich and Lesley Lopez, and executive producer Lisha Yakub Sevanian. Theo Germaine was attracted to the idea of playing the complex protagonist, saying, “There’s this trend for actors like me to play characters who are super good…Aaron is just kind of a mess. He’s all over the place and he is desperate and he makes bad decisions. I liked playing a character that was not perfect in any way.” The film was shot in Los Angeles, with cinematography by Tamiah Bantum and Mathew Young, and editing by Peter Frintrup. Production companies included Berlin 7 LLC and ReKon Productions.

== Release ==
Spark had its world premiere on May 24, 2024, at the Inside Out Film and Video Festival in Toronto and was later screened at the Dances With Films Festival in Los Angeles on June 24, 2024. The film was acquired by Freestyle Digital Media in 2025 and was released on Video on Demand platforms in North America on June 10, 2025.

== Reception ==
Spark received some positive feedback. Elisabeth Vincentelli of the New York Times wrote “About half of Nicholas Giuricich’s “Spark” explores fairly familiar terrain, albeit with matter-of-fact queer representation, but the movie then steers off into less predictable territory.” Thomas Erin of Original Cin wrote, “There are endless time-warp movies, and yet Giuricich somehow manages to bring something fresh to a genre.” Rachel Shatto of Pride.com described the film as “an erotic queer time loop thriller.” Paz O’Farrell of ScreenAnarchy also gave the film a positive review and wrote “The middle was riveting. It is hard for the viewer not to get invested in this film about romance and Vico Ortiz particularly shines in their performance.” The film was also praised for its portrayal of trans and non-binary characters, with Pat Mullen of Extra Magazine stating, “Spark marks Theo Germaine as a star to watch in a breakthrough generation for trans and non-binary representation.”
