= Malika Bilal =

American journalist

- Born: Chicago, Illinois, U.S.
- Education: Universal School Northwestern University
- Occupation: Host of The Take on Al Jazeera Podcasts
- Years active: 2006–present
- Notable credit: Malika Bilal Co-host The Stream on Al Jazeera English Channel

Malika Bilal (Arabic: مليكة بلال) is a broadcast journalist currently working for Al Jazeera English.

Bilal is the host of the Al Jazeera Podcast The Take. Previously she was co-host and digital producer of The Stream, based at the Al Jazeera English US broadcast-center, in Washington, DC.

She joined the DC bureau from the channel's main broadcast-center in Doha, in Qatar, where she worked as an editor and writer for the Al Jazeera English website.

== Personal life ==
Born and raised in Chicago, Illinois, she self-professedly grew up listening to All Things Considered and Morning Edition on NPR during the long car rides to and from school with her parents.

Bilal went to Universal School for middle school and Northwestern University in Evanston, Illinois, where she studied journalism. She also attended the American University in Cairo to develop her knowledge of Arabic.

== Career ==
Bilal began her career as a TV broadcaster on her campus station, but also wrote for magazines. She was then a daily reporter on a Tribune Company newspaper ^{[which?]} and, in 2006, also worked for Voice of America.

Al Jazeera English

Bilal joined Al Jazeera English in February 2009 and became the co-host of the award-winning program, The Stream in 2012.
