= Theo Germaine =

American actor

- Born: Murphysboro, Illinois, U.S.
- Education: University of Illinois at Urbana–Champaign
- Occupation: Actor
- Years active: 2015–present

Theo Germaine is an American actor, best known for playing James Sullivan on the Netflix television series The Politician.

== Career ==
Germaine acted in plays at Steppenwolf and The Goodman in Chicago before being cast in The Politician on Netflix and Work in Progress on Showtime in 2019. They starred alongside Kevin Bacon in the 2022 slasher film They/Them, which centers on an LGBTQ conversion therapy camp.

They starred in the hybrid fiction-documentary Desire Lines (2024), which explores the history of transmasculine sexuality and was a selection of the NEXT program at the 2024 Sundance Film Festival.

== Personal life ==
Germaine was born in Murphysboro but grew up largely in Monticello, Illinois with two younger siblings. Germaine is transmasculine and non-binary and uses they/them and he/him pronouns. Germaine experienced gender dysphoria as a young child and medically and socially transitioned as a teen. They worked at a coffee shop in Chicago before temporarily relocating to Los Angeles for The Politician. Germaine's background includes theatre, dance, comedy, and circus work.

== Filmography ==
=== Television ===
Year	Title	Role	Notes
2019–2021	Work in Progress	Chris	9 episodes
2019–2020	The Politician	James Sullivan	15 episodes
2020	Equal	Jack Starr	
2021	4400	Noah Harris	

=== Film ===
Year	Title	Role	Notes
2019	Adam	Carlisle	
2019	Holy Trinity	Baby	
2022	Night's End	Lyden Knight	
2022	They/Them	Jordan Lewis	
2024	Desire Lines	Kieran	Premiered at Sundance Film Festival 2024
2024	Spark	Aaron	Premiered at the Inside Out Film and Video Festival
