= Sam Sanders (journalist) =

American journalist

- Born: August 1984 (age 41); New Braunfels, Texas, U.S.
- Education: University of the Incarnate Word (BA); Harvard Kennedy School (MPP)
- Occupations: Journalist, podcaster

Sam Sanders (born August 1984) is an American journalist and podcast host. He is one of the co-hosts of the Stitcher/SiriusXM podcast Vibe Check, and the host and executive producer of The Sam Sanders Show, a podcast and radio show on NPR member station KCRW. He launched and previously hosted NPR's It's Been a Minute, a weekly podcast and nationally broadcast radio program, and Into It, a culture podcast from Vulture.

== Early life and education ==
Sanders was born in New Braunfels, Texas, to Regina (née Garrett) and Ruben Sanders, and grew up in the San Antonio area. He has three older brothers.

Sanders is a graduate of Samuel Clemens High School in Schertz, Texas. He earned a bachelor’s degree in music and political science from the University of the Incarnate Word in 2007 and went on to earn a master's degree in public policy from the Harvard Kennedy School.

== Career ==
During graduate school, Sanders developed an interest in radio journalism and interned at the WBUR program On Point.

He joined NPR in 2009 as a Kroc Fellow, later moving into field producing and breaking news. In 2015 he joined NPR's Election unit, where he covered the Bernie Sanders 2016 presidential campaign and was one of the founding co-hosts of The NPR Politics Podcast. In 2017, he created and hosted a pop culture podcast and radio show at NPR, It’s Been a Minute.

After 12 years, Sanders left NPR in 2022 and joined Vulture to host a pop culture podcast called Into It. Parent company Vox Media canceled the show in October 2023.

In August 2022, Sanders launched a podcast with SiriusXM's Stitcher called Vibe Check, focusing on "news and culture from a Black and queer perspective." The podcast is co-hosted by Sanders, Zach Stafford, and Saeed Jones.

In October 2024, Sanders returned to public radio airwaves with The Sam Sanders Show on NPR member station KCRW in Los Angeles. Covering pop culture and "the things we obsess over in our free time," The Sam Sanders Show launched on air and on YouTube with guests Joel Kim Booster and Sasheer Zamata.

== Personal life ==
Sanders lives in Los Angeles, California, with his dogs Zora and Wesley Snipes. He is gay.
