= Broomgate: A Curling Scandal =

CBC podcast

Broomgate: A Curling Scandal is a documentary podcast about broomgate produced by the Canadian Broadcasting Corporation.

== Background ==
The trailer for the show was released April 24, 2024. The podcast was released shortly before the 2024 Summer Olympics with the first two episodes debuting on May 6, 2024, and subsequent episodes being released on a weekly basis. The show is hosted by comedian John Cullen, who was also a competitive curler. Cullen started using a brush from a company called Hardline Curling and recommended the brush to Mike McEwen. The show was produced by Kelly&Kelly and Pacific Electric for the CBC and USG Audio.

== Reception ==
Nicholas Quah commented on the show saying "it's hard not to be charmed and fascinated by a series that seriously grapples with curling". Esquire included the show on their list of the best podcasts of 2024 stating that "this is the perfect show to learn about the sport [of curling] and its universe".

=== Awards ===
Award	Date	Category	Result	Ref.
Signal Awards	2024	Best Documentary Podcast	Gold	
Ambies	2025	Best Sports Podcast	Won	
