= A. J. Johnson (cornerback) =

American football player (born 1967)

No. 47
- Position: Cornerback

Personal information
- Born: June 22, 1967 (age 59); Lompoc, California, U.S.
- Listed height: 5 ft 8 in (1.73 m)
- Listed weight: 175 lb (79 kg)

Career information
- High school: Schertz (TX) Clemens
- College: Texas State
- NFL draft: 1989: 6th round, 149th overall pick

Career history
- Washington Redskins (1989–1994); Kansas City Chiefs (1995)*; San Diego Chargers (1995)
- * Offseason or practice squad member only

Awards and highlights
- Super Bowl champion (XXVI)

Career NFL statistics
- Total tackles: 197
- Sacks: 1
- Fumble recoveries: 2
- Interceptions: 9
- Defensive touchdowns: 2
- Stats at Pro Football Reference

Anthony Sean Johnson (born June 22, 1967) is an American former professional football player who was a cornerback in the National Football League (NFL) for the Washington Redskins and San Diego Chargers. He played college football for the Texas State Bobcats and was selected in the sixth round of the 1989 NFL draft. His nephew is former Tennessee Titans safety Kenny Vaccaro.
