= Twenty Thousand Hertz =

Podcast about sound design

Cast and voices
- Hosted by: Dallas Taylor

Production
- Production: Defacto Sound

Publication
- No. of episodes: 221
- Original release: 2016-10-31
- Updates: Biweekly

Related
- Website: 20k.org

Twenty Thousand Hertz is a podcast about "the world’s most recognizable and interesting sounds". Episodes are published every other Wednesday.

== Overview ==
The show's title refers to highest frequency that can be perceived within the human hearing range (without hearing loss). It grew out of host Dallas Taylor's admiration for the podcast 99% Invisible and a desire to hear more stories like the ones they produced about audio design. The show is hosted and produced by Dallas Taylor and the writer of the episode, with help from Sam Schneble.

Though the audio production company Defacto Sound, which is owned by Taylor, is the production headquarters for Twenty Thousand Hertz, he has said that the podcast is not intended as content marketing. Instead of focusing on the industry of sound design exclusively, episodes focus on a variety of topics related to sound. The podcast has covered topics such as the THX Deep Note, misophonia, the Voyager Golden Record, the Shure SM7 microphone, ASMR, and advertising jingles.

"Theater of the Mind", a crossover episode with the podcast Imaginary Worlds, was produced in 2018. The episode explored the history of radio dramas. Episodes of Twenty Thousand Hertz have also been featured on the Radiotopia productions 99% Invisible and The Allusionist.

In May 2020, host Dallas Taylor delivered a TED Talk, "What silence can teach you about sound." The talk discussed John Cage's composition 4'33", a topic which had previously been explored in an episode of Twenty Thousand Hertz. In August 2020, the podcast joined the TED podcast network, but left due to unexplained reasons. In October 2020, host Dallas Taylor was featured in "Sound and Silence," an episode of the TED Radio Hour, drawn from his TED Talk.

Following a Twenty Thousand Hertz episode about audio deepfakes, host Dallas Taylor was featured in a September 2020 segment of NPR's Here & Now, discussing the topic. Taylor was featured in a November 2020 episode of the Popular Science podcast The Weirdest Thing I Learned This Week, discussing the use of animals noises in sound design.

== Reception ==
The podcast was featured in Esquire magazine's list of "The 63 Best Podcasts You Can Listen To In 2020," as well as Discover Pods "The 71 Best Podcasts of 2020."

In 2017, OZY listed Twenty Thousand Hertz as one of "4 Podcasts that'll Make You Wish Your Commute Were Longer."

Doug Fabrizio of KUER-FM says the show "challenges listeners to refine their sense of hearing." In a review for 34th Street Magazine, reviewer Caylen David writes, "Twenty Thousand Hertz presents the stories of iconic sound designs in a creative way that keeps listeners wanting more. Give it a listen—you might find that the journey to create pop culture's greatest sounds is more interesting than the finished product."

The show's "I'm Lovin' It" episode was chosen as one of Spotify's "Best Podcast Episodes of 2021."

=== Awards ===
Award	Year	Category	Result	Ref.
Webby Awards	2019	People's Voice Award for Best Original Music / Sound Design	Won	
Webby Awards	2020	Webby Award for Science & Education	Won	
Webby Awards	2020	People's Voice Award for Science & Education	Won	
Webby Awards	2025	Webby Award for Science & Education	Won	
Academy of Podcasters	2017	Arts	Won	
Adweek's Audio Awards (Formerly Podcast of the Year Awards)	2021	Best Innovation Podcast	Won	
Adweek's Audio Awards (Formerly Podcast of the Year Awards)	2024	Best Technology Podcast	Won	
Ambies	2022	Best Production and Sound Design	Won	
Ambies	2023	Best Production and Sound Design	Won	
Ambies	2025	Best Indie Podcast Host	Won	
Ambies	2026	Best Entertainment Podcast	Won	
