= I'm Not A Monster =

- Genre: Documentary
- Country of origin: United Kingdom
- Language: English

Creative team
- Written by: Josh Baker; Joe Kent

Cast and voices
- Hosted by: Josh Baker

Production
- Length: 20-45 minutes

Publication
- No. of seasons: 2
- No. of episodes: 23
- Original release: 23 November 2020 – 22 March 2023
- Provider: BBC Sounds

I'm Not A Monster is a BBC Sounds documentary podcast produced by BBC Panorama and PBS Frontline. The first series, released between November 2020 and January 2022, followed the story of Sam Sally, an American woman who lived under the Islamic State with her husband and children. The second series, I'm Not A Monster: The Shamima Begum Story, was released in 2023 and followed Shamima Begum, a U.K.-born woman who joined the Islamic State at age 15.

The podcast is hosted by British journalist Josh Baker, who is also a producer, and written by Baker and Joe Kent.

== Development ==
Producer Josh Baker became interested in the story of Samantha Sally in 2016, after seeing a video of her son being forced to build a suicide bomb. This sparked a four-year-long investigation into the whereabouts of the family and, once they were out of Islamic State control, how and why Sally and her children had ended up with the Islamic State to begin with. Season one of the podcast follows Baker's investigation.

The podcast was announced in November 2020, and marked the first collaborative project between BBC Panorama and PBS Frontline.

In 2023, the podcast was greenlit for a second season focusing on Shamima Begum.

== Reception ==
Both series one and two of the podcast have been well received. The second series saw particular praise from British media, who applauded the podcast's telling and analysis of the story of Shamima Begum, which had already been covered extensively in Britain. The Telegraph noted, "the podcast turns out to be ingenious, and Baker’s approach is incredibly revealing". The podcast was BBC Sounds' eighth most popular podcast in 2023.

== Awards ==
Year	Award	Category	Result	Ref
2021	Awards for Excellence in Audio	Best Documentary Podcast	Won	
2021	Awards for Excellence in Audio	Best Reporting	Nominated	
2021	Awards for Excellence in Audio	Best True Crime	Nominated	
2021	Online Journalism Awards	Excellence in Audio Digital Storytelling, Limited Series	finalist	
2021	Webby Awards	Documentary Podcasts	Won	
2023	British Podcast Awards	Best Documentary Podcast	Silver Award	
2023	British Podcast Awards	Best News & Current Affairs Podcast	Silver Award	
2023	British Podcast Awards	Best True Crime Podcast	Silver Award	
2024	New York Festivals Radio Awards	Investigative Journalism Podcast	Gold Award	
