= Holy Trinity (film) =

2019 American comedy film

- Promotional release poster
- Directed by: Molly Hewitt
- Written by: Molly Hewitt
- Screenplay by: Molly Hewitt
- Story by: Molly Hewitt
- Produced by: Molly Hewitt; Eugene Sun Park
- Starring: Molly Hewitt; Theo Germaine
- Cinematography: Greg Stephen Reigh
- Edited by: Ashley Thompson
- Production company: Full Spectrum Features
- Release date: July 2019 (Outfest)
- Running time: 91 minutes
- Country: United States
- Language: English

Holy Trinity is a 2019 American comedy film written, produced, directed by, and starring Molly Hewitt in their feature directorial debut. Hewitt plays Trinity, a dominatrix who, after huffing from a mysterious aerosol can, discovers that she has the ability to communicate with the dead. The film also stars Theo Germaine, and was executive produced by Joe Swanberg.

Holy Trinity screened at the LGBTQ-oriented film festival Outfest in July 2019, as well as at the New York Lesbian, Gay, Bisexual, & Transgender Film Festival in October 2019.

== Cast ==
- Molly Hewitt as Trinity, a dominatrix who develops the ability to communicate with the dead after huffing from a mysterious aerosol can.
- Theo Germaine as Baby, Trinity's partner, and a musician.
- Heather Lynn as Carol
- Imp Queen as Self (Imp Queen)

== Reception ==
On Rotten Tomatoes, the film has an approval rating of 82% based on 11 reviews, with an average rating of 6.4/10.

Beandrea July of The Hollywood Reporter criticized the film's dialogue but concluded that the film "celebrates living a sex- and kink-positive life and explores how an affirmative spirituality fits into that." Richard Roeper, writing for the Chicago Sun-Times, gave the film three out of four stars, commending Hewitt's performance and calling the film "An adventure sprinkled with quite a bit of kink." Michael Phillips of the Chicago Tribune gave the film two out of four stars, calling it "Bracingly sex-positive in all directions, if oddly flat as a performance vehicle".

The Chicago Reader's Cody Corrall gave the film three out of four stars, writing that it "may not give everything it wants to cover the same amount of attention, but it leaves its audience with plenty to think about, from the politics of kink, to becoming a god and subordinating oneself interpersonally and within societal frameworks." Ben Sachs, also of the Chicago Reader, complimented the film's production design but noted that "Hewitt still has a ways to go in terms of storytelling; many of the scenes drag on past their welcome, and the overall pacing feels indifferent."

Jude Dry of IndieWire included Holy Trinity on their list of 2019 "LGBTQ Films Not to Be Missed".
