= Samuel Clemens High School =

Location
- 1001 Elbel Road; Schertz, Texas 78154-2098; United States; 29.5636429°N 98.2656090°W

Information
- Type: Public
- Established: 1968
- School district: Schertz-Cibolo-Universal City Independent School District
- President: Amy Sirizzotti
- Teaching staff: 141.26 (on an FTE basis)
- Grades: 9-12
- Enrollment: 2,651 (2025-2026)
- Student to teacher ratio: 18.14
- Colors: Royal Blue & Gold
- Athletics conference: UIL Class 6A
- Nickname: Buffaloes, Lady Buffs
- Website: Samuel Clemens; High School

Samuel Clemens High School is a public high school in Schertz, Texas, United States. It is operated by the Schertz-Cibolo-Universal City Independent School District, and classified as a 6A school by the UIL.

For the 2021–2022 school year, the school was given a "B" by the Texas Education Agency.

== History ==
The school traces its origins back to the 1917 "Schertz High School", later called "Schertz-Cibolo High School". In 1961 the school district was established and in 1967 Universal City was annexed into the district, formally becoming SCUC ISD. A decision was made to rename the school, however all the band jackets and other uniforms featured the letters SC for "Schertz-Cibolo", and it would have proved cost prohibitive to change it. A contest was held to name the school using those same initials of SC, and Samuel Clemens was the winner. Samuel Clemens is better known by the pen name Mark Twain.

== Notable alumni ==
- Sherman Corbett, MLB player and UTSA Roadrunners baseball head coach
- Colton Haynes, actor and model
- A. J. Johnson, NFL player
- Sean Porter, NFL player
- Robert Reid, NBA player
- Peso Pluma, musician
- Sam Sanders, journalist
