= Zach Stafford =

American journalist

- Born: Tennessee, United States
- Education: DePaul University
- Occupation: Journalist
- Era: 21st century
- Employer: The Advocate
- Organization(s): Pride Media, Inc.
- Website: twitter.com/ZachStafford

Zach Stafford is a journalist and the former editor-in-chief of The Advocate magazine. He is currently a columnist at MSNBC. Stafford won a Tony Award in 2022 as one of the co-producers of A Strange Loop.

== Early life and education ==
Stafford was born in Tennessee. He attended DePaul University and studied women's and gender studies.

== Career ==
Stafford got his start as a reporter for The Guardian, reporting on police brutality and LGBTQ issues. He was editor-at-large for Out magazine before being hired as the Chief Content Officer of Grindr. In that role, he also served as the editor-in-chief of the app's digital magazine, Into. Stafford is the first black person to serve as the editor-in-chief of The Advocate, the oldest and largest LGBTQ publication in the United States. "I have long respected The Advocate and the role the magazine played in the LGBTQ community, which started with their reporting on police brutality in the late 1960s, a topic I'm intimately familiar with from my own work", Stafford told NBC News. "I am incredibly excited to lead The Advocate in reporting and storytelling on LGBTQ life around the world, even if it means ruffling a few feathers along the way."

Stafford co-hosted the LGBTQ Presidential Forum in the 2020 Democratic Primary. The event was hosted by The Advocate, GLAAD, and the Cedar Rapids Gazette. At the event, Vox reported that New Jersey senator Cory Booker "entered the stage and immediately gave the Advocate editor-in-chief Zach Stafford a bearhug, lifting the journalist off his feet."

In May 2019, Stafford was announced as the new co-host of BuzzFeed News's morning show, AM to DM. Stafford and Alex Berg replaced Isaac Fitzgerald and Saeed Jones, who had been with the show since it launched in 2017. The show covers trending tweets, the biggest news stories of the day, and interviews with celebrity guests and experts.

In June 2020, Stafford was the inaugural editor-at-large for the relaunch of Buzzfeed's LGBTQ vertical and hosted their podcast, News O'Clock, a daily news podcast from Buzzfeed and IHeartRadio.

Since April 2021, he has been a columnist at MSNBC and has also appeared as contributor on their television network.

In August 2022, Stafford launched a podcast with SiriusXM's Stitcher called Vibe Check, focusing on "news and culture from a Black and queer perspective." The podcast was created by Stafford, Sam Sanders, and Saeed Jones, and, as of 2026, is co-hosted by Stafford and Jones.

== Awards and honors ==
Stafford has been recognized on The Root 100 and Forbes 30 Under 30. The Advocate won the GLAAD Media Award for Outstanding Magazine Overall Coverage in 2020 under his tenure.

In 2022, Stafford won a Tony Award for co-producing A Strange Loop when the show won for Best Musical.

== Works ==
Boys, an Anthology (2013), Thought Catalog; ISBN 978-1629213712

Greetings From New Nashville: How a Sleepy Southern Town Became “It” City (2020), Vanderbilt Press; ISBN 978-0826500274

When Dogs Heal: Powerful Stories of People Living with HIV and the Dogs That Saved Them (2021), Lerner Publishing; ISBN 978-1541586734

== Personal life ==
He is gay.
