= The NPR Politics Podcast =

Political podcast created by NPR

- Genre: Politics
- Language: English

Cast and voices
- Hosted by: Various

Production
- Length: 15–20 minutes

Publication
- Original release: November 9, 2015
- Provider: NPR

Related
- Website: www.npr.org/podcasts/510310/npr-politics-podcast

The NPR Politics Podcast is a political podcast by NPR.

== Background ==
The show is often recorded "on the run" rather than in a studio and has a less formal tone than a radio program. The show features segments where they answer listeners' questions.

The show released episodes twice weekly and is hosted by a revolving group of NPR Politics team members. The show later started releasing episodes daily. The show also releases a weekly roundup episode summarizing the week's news.

== Reception ==
In 2023, the show was the 9th most listened to news podcast in the United States according to the Reuters Digital News Report. Vulture included the show in their list of the shows that "Shaped the Genre". Nicholas Quah included the show on his list of "The 10 Best Podcasts of 2016".

=== Awards ===
Award	Date	Category	Result	Ref.
Discover Pods Awards	2019	News Podcast	Nominated	
Ambies	2021	Best Politics or Opinion Podcast	Nominated	
Ambies	2024	Best Politics or Opinion Podcast	Won	
Ambies	2025	Best Politics or Opinion Podcast	Won	
iHeartRadio Podcast Awards	2021	Best Political Podcast	Won	
iHeartRadio Podcast Awards	2022	Best Political Podcast	Nominated	
iHeartRadio Podcast Awards	2023	Best Political Podcast	Won	
iHeartRadio Podcast Awards	2025	Best Political Podcast	Nominated	
