= The Stream (Al Jazeera English) =

Daily television programme on Al Jazeera English

- Genre: Television news magazine
- Created by: Al Jazeera English
- Presented by: Stefanie Dekker
- Country of origin: Qatar
- Original language: English

Production
- Executive producer: David Poort
- Production locations: Doha, Qatar
- Running time: 25 minutes

Original release
- Network: Al Jazeera English
- Release: April 2011 – present

Related
- Witness; The Listening Post; 101 East; Inside Story; UpFront

The Stream is a current affairs discussion programme that airs on Al Jazeera English.

The show features discussions on stories and issues that are not necessarily on newspaper front pages or at the top of news bulletins, but are being debated and dissected online. Tapping into the numerous communities that live online, The Stream says it "discusses some of the most interesting issues, bringing fresh perspectives and lesser heard voices."

For more than a decade, the show was produced in the channel's Washington DC hub. In 2023, the show was moved to Doha.

== About the show ==
The Stream was launched in April 2011. It began as a show that went out only online before the TV broadcast began. It called itself "a social media community with its own daily TV show" and was hosted by Derrick Ashong and Ahmed Shihab-Eldin. The show was filmed out of the Newseum building in Washington DC.

The Stream came at a time when Al Jazeera English was seeing a surge in its global audience. The uprisings across the Arab world - the Arab Spring - had boosted interest in Al Jazeera's journalism. The role of social media in organising, documenting and amplifying those protests had put the spotlight on the volume of discussions happening online. The Stream's hosts said the online world was key for the show since "the web…is really where we're going to be…meeting the right kinds of people and tapping into the right kinds of conversations that are already happening about news and current events."

For many years, the show's broadcast straddled online and TV, with pre- and post-shows taking place online to engage with the viewing community. Viewers could watch live on YouTube, and speak directly with a producer through a live chat that would run throughout the show. The programme would also host daily live conversations on its Instagram account. The show has more than 250,000 followers on Twitter, where it solicits opinions on the topics it covers and gathers tweets to feature in the show.

The Stream is particularly popular on the African continent and often trends on Twitter in countries such as Nigeria, Ethiopia and Uganda.

== People ==
The Stream has had multiple hosts - Stefanie Dekker

The show's executive producer is David Poort.

== Al Jazeera America version ==
A separate American version of The Stream was featured on Al Jazeera America. It was produced from Washington, D.C., and hosted by Lisa Fletcher and Wajahat Ali. The show was identical in style to its Al Jazeera English counterpart, including being shot from the same studio and set in Washington, D.C.

It ceased production in 2016 ahead of the closure of Al Jazeera America in April of the same year.

== Awards ==
In 2017, The Stream won a silver medal for best Online News Program at the New York Festivals Best Television and Film Awards.

In 2014, it won a Webby Award for Best Online Film in the News and Politics category for the show 'Meme-ifying Black Interviewees'. The Stream was nominated for two other Webbys the same year.

In 2013, It was awarded the Gracie for Outstanding News Talk Show and secured commendations at the Online Media Awards for Outstanding Digital Team and Best Twitter Feed.

In 2012, The Stream won a Webby Award for People's Choice in news and politics in the online film and video category, a Royal Television Society award for Most Innovative Programme, and was nominated for an Emmy Award for New Approach to News and Documentary Programming.

It has had an Online News Association nomination for "Planned News Events" and a GLAAD nomination for "Outstanding TV Journalism."
