= Hot White Heist =

Audible Original podcast

Publication
- Provider: Audible

Related
- Website: www.audible.com/pd/Hot-White-Heist-Podcast/B095T2L8G6

Hot White Heist is a scripted podcast written by Adam Goldman and produced by Broadway Video and Club Cumming Productions. The show is an Audible Original and stars Bowen Yang along with a fully queer cast. The podcast is about a team attempting a heist to steal frozen sperm.

== Background ==
The podcast was written by Adam Goldman and produced by Broadway Video and Club Cumming Productions. The show was originally intended to be a film. The show is an Audible Original podcast. The podcast is six episodes long. The entire cast of the show consists of queer people. The podcast stars Bowen Yang. The cast includes Abbi Jacobson, Alan Cumming, Bianca Del Rio, Katya Zamolodchikova, Cheyenne Jackson, Cynthia Nixon, Jane Lynch, John Cameron Mitchell, Jonathan Bailey, Margaret Cho, Michaela Jaé Rodriguez, Peppermint, Shannon Woodward, Stephanie Beatriz, and Tony Kushner. Bowen plays a character named Jude who is a fortuneteller from Manhattan. The podcast is about a team of people attempting to steal frozen sperm samples. The podcast was renewed for a second season.

== Plot ==
Deep underground in a Government bunker lies the United States Seed Registry, which stores the frozen sperm of famous men, such as Ronald Reagan, Stephen Hawking and Mark Zuckerberg. A group of queers hatch a plan to break into the vault and steal the sperm, hoping they can sell it to wealthy Russians and then use the money to build an all-queer island paradise named New Lesbos.
