= Throughline =

NPR historical podcast and radio program

- Genre: history, news commentary
- Language: English

Cast and voices
- Hosted by: Rund Abdelfatah

Production
- Length: 30–60 minutes

Publication
- Original release: February 2019 – present
- Provider: National Public Radio
- Updates: Weekly

Throughline is a historical podcast and radio program from American public radio network NPR. The podcast aims to contextualize current events by exploring the historical events that contributed to them. Its episodes have outlined the history of modern political debates, civil rights issues, and domestic and international policy. The show is NPR's first history podcast.

== Hosts and program ==
Throughline is hosted by Rund Abdelfatah, a radio producer who previously worked on NPR programs such as TED Radio Hour and How I Built This. Abdelfatah is Palestinian-American and former co-host Ramtin Arablouei is Iranian-American; both have spoken about the importance of Middle Eastern representation in American media.

The podcast focuses on the relationship between the latest news and historical events - "go[ing] back in time to understand the present." Its sound design incorporates discussion between the two hosts, as well as interviews with historians and audio clips from historical newscasts and recordings. The show also aims to tell the histories of underrepresented and forgotten people in the United States, often airing stories about racial and religious minorities.

== History ==
Throughline launched on February 7, 2019. It gained notability in 2020 and 2021 with episodes that addressed the history of policing in America, the development of the N-95 mask, the establishment of the electoral college, and the rise of the modern white power movement.

Starting on January 15, 2021, NPR has made Throughline episodes available to local public radio stations as a radio show.

In May 2026, co-host Ramtin Arablouie left NPR amid an internal investigation into inappropriate behavior toward a female colleague.

== Awards and reception ==
In 2019, Throughline was included in both TIME and The Atlantic lists of the 50 Best Podcasts of the year. It was also included in lists of the best political or historical podcasts by Oprah Magazine, Town & Country, and GQ in 2020.

Throughline was nominated for Best History Podcast in the 2021 iHeartRadio Podcast Awards, and won the award in 2022.

Throughline won a Peabody Award for a 2021 episode about the history and culture of Afghanistan.

Throughline won the Ambie Award for Best Production and Sound Design in 2024.

== See also ==
- List of history podcasts
