= Chameleon: Wild Boys =

True crime podcast by Sam Mullins

- Genre: Investigative journalism; True crime
- Country of origin: United States
- Language: English

Cast and voices
- Hosted by: Sam Mullins

Production
- Production: Abukar Adan; Ashleyanne Krigbaum; Matt Shaer
- Length: Variable (30–45 minutes)

Technical specifications
- Audio format: Podcast (via streaming or downloadable MP3)

Publication
- No. of seasons: 1
- No. of episodes: 9
- Original release: July 7, 2022
- Provider: Campside Media

Related
- Website: Chameleon: Wild Boys

Chameleon: Wild Boys is an investigative journalism and true crime podcast hosted by Sam Mullins. It is the third season of the Chameleon true crime podcast series produced by Campside Media and Sony Music. Wild Boys tells the true story of two young men who turned up in a Canadian town claiming to have been raised in the British Columbian wilderness. The first episode was released on January 25, 2022.

== Overview ==
The podcast describes the story of brothers Tom and Will Green who, in 2003, arrive in Vernon, British Columbia, claiming to have been in raised in the remote town of Revelstoke. They claim that their parents lived off the grid, that they were kicked out by their parents, and their family's lifestyle is the reason they have no forms of identification. The boys are welcomed in by the community of Vernon, particularly a local hockey mom, Tami. Concerns grow over the younger brother, Will's health, as he remains underweight. When immigration, police and local media are brought in, the boys' story seems suspicious. It is revealed that the boys were not raised in the wilderness and that their backstory is fabricated. Mullins goes on to interview the boys' family members and details how they were grew up with unconventional and rigid ideological beliefs about nutrition, health and longevity.

== Reception ==
In a weekly review of podcasts in the week of its release, Miranda Sawyer for the Guardian gave Wild Boys a positive review saying "it's beautifully paced, with excellent cliffhangers and much care in the sound production". The Irish Independent said "Mullins is a clear-sighted host, who unravels the narrative in a respectful and engaging way, simultaneously teasing out both the hinterland and heart of the story." Stuff gave the podcast a positive review and said it "strikes critical but empathetic balance".

Wild Boys won Podcast of the Year at the 2023 Ambie Awards.
