= SmartLess =

2020 comedy podcast

- Genre: Comedy; Talk
- Language: English

Cast and voices
- Hosted by: Will Arnett; Jason Bateman; Sean Hayes

Production
- Length: 34–77 minutes

Publication
- No. of episodes: 333 + bonus
- Original release: July 20, 2020 – present
- Provider: SiriusXM
- Updates: Weekly (Monday)

Related
- Website: www.smartless.com

SmartLess is a podcast hosted by the American actors Jason Bateman and Sean Hayes, and Canadian actor Will Arnett. Its first episode was released on July 20, 2020, and new episodes are released weekly each Monday. Every episode begins with one of the hosts revealing a mystery guest to the other two hosts. Once revealed, the three hosts begin interviewing the guest.

In May 2021, the podcast signed with Creative Artists Agency. In June 2021, the podcast was acquired by Amazon for around US$80 million. With the deal, the podcast was made available on Amazon Music and Wondery+ one week before other podcast and streaming platforms. SiriusXM acquired the podcast from Amazon in 2024 for a reported US$100 million.

On May 23, 2023, Max premiered a six-episode documentary-style special following the podcast's North American six-city tour, which began in February 2022, featuring behind-the-scenes footage and celebrity interviews.

== Episodes ==
No.	Title	Original release date
1	"Dax Shepard"	July 20, 2020
2	"Neil deGrasse Tyson"	July 27, 2020
3	"Melissa McCarthy"	August 3, 2020
4	"Seth Rogen"	August 10, 2020
5	"Kamala Harris"	August 17, 2020
6	"Will Ferrell"	August 24, 2020
7	"Robert Downey Jr."	August 31, 2020
8	"Maya Rudolph"	September 7, 2020
9	"Jimmy Kimmel"	September 14, 2020
10	"Gustavo Dudamel"	September 21, 2020
11	"Jennifer Aniston"	September 28, 2020
12	"Clayton Kershaw"	October 5, 2020
13	"Adam Sandler"	October 12, 2020
14	"Stacey Abrams"	October 19, 2020
15	"Reese Witherspoon"	October 26, 2020
16	"Brendan Shanahan"	November 2, 2020
17	"Conan O'Brien"	November 9, 2020
18	"David Chang"	November 16, 2020
19	"Paul McCartney"	November 23, 2020
20	"Sarah Silverman"	November 30, 2020
21	"Ricky Gervais"	December 7, 2020
22	"Ron Howard"	December 14, 2020
23	"James Corden"	December 21, 2020
24	"Megan Rapinoe"	December 28, 2020
25	"Martin Short"	January 4, 2021
26	"Bryan Cranston"	January 11, 2021
27	"Julia Louis-Dreyfus"	January 18, 2021
28	"Sam Harris"	January 25, 2021
29	"Darius Rucker"	February 1, 2021
30	"Judd Apatow"	February 8, 2021
31	"Billie Eilish and Finneas O'Connell"	February 15, 2021
32	"David A. Sinclair"	February 22, 2021
33	"Awkwafina"	March 1, 2021
34	"George Clooney"	March 8, 2021
35	"Brad Paisley"	March 15, 2021
36	"W. Kamau Bell"	March 22, 2021
37	"Stephen Colbert"	March 29, 2021
38	"Ted Sarandos"	April 5, 2021
39	"Bob Odenkirk"	April 12, 2021
40	"Jessica Meir"	April 19, 2021
41	"Amy Sedaris"	April 26, 2021
42	"Gwyneth Paltrow"	May 3, 2021
43	"Tina Fey"	May 10, 2021
44	"Zach Galifianakis"	May 17, 2021
45	"Jake Tapper"	May 24, 2021
46	"Mitch Hurwitz"	May 31, 2021
47	"Rob McElhenney"	June 7, 2021
48	"Justin Theroux"	June 14, 2021
49	"David Cross"	June 21, 2021
50	"José Andrés"	June 28, 2021
51	"Elizabeth Banks"	July 5, 2021
52	"LeBron James"	July 12, 2021
53	"Ryan Reynolds"	July 19, 2021
54	"Joy Reid"	July 26, 2021
55	"J. J. Abrams"	August 2, 2021
56	"Tony Hawk"	August 9, 2021
57	"Daniel Ricciardo"	August 16, 2021
58	"Octavia Spencer"	August 23, 2021
59	"Sean Penn"	August 30, 2021
60	"Fred Armisen"	September 6, 2021
61	"Tiffany Haddish"	September 13, 2021
62	"Ken Burns"	September 20, 2021
63	"Jon Stewart"	September 27, 2021
64	"Jeff Daniels"	October 4, 2021
65	"David Remnick"	October 11, 2021
66	"Chelsea Handler"	October 18, 2021
67	"Joe Buck"	October 25, 2021
68	"Tom Hanks"	November 1, 2021
69	"Jerry Seinfeld"	November 8, 2021
70	"Vivek Murthy"	November 15, 2021
71	"Halle Berry"	November 22, 2021
72	"Dave Grohl"	November 29, 2021
73	"Sandra Bullock"	December 6, 2021
74	"Jimmy Fallon"	December 13, 2021
75	"Will Forte"	December 20, 2021
76	"Woody Harrelson"	December 27, 2021
77	"Barry Sonnenfeld"	January 3, 2022
78	"Kathryn Hahn"	January 10, 2022
79	"David Byrne"	January 17, 2022
80	"Michael Moore"	January 24, 2022
81	"Johnny Knoxville"	January 31, 2022
82	"Adam McKay"	February 7, 2022
83	"Eddie Vedder"	February 14, 2022
84	"Courteney Cox"	February 21, 2022
85	"Charlie Day"	February 28, 2022
86	"Paul Thomas Anderson"	March 7, 2022
87	"Cate Blanchett"	March 14, 2022
88	"Thom Yorke and Jonny Greenwood"	March 21, 2022
89	"David Spade"	March 28, 2022
90	"Jon Hamm"	April 4, 2022
91	"Michael Lewis"	April 11, 2022
92	"Craig Robinson"	April 18, 2022
93	"Bill Maher"	April 25, 2022
94	"Liam Neeson"	May 2, 2022
95	"Mike Myers"	May 9, 2022
96	"John Mulaney"	May 16, 2022
97	"Ben Stiller"	May 23, 2022
98	"Kristen Wiig"	May 30, 2022
99	"Phil Lord and Christopher Miller"	June 6, 2022
100	"Bradley Cooper"	June 13, 2022
101	"Chris Pratt"	June 20, 2022
102	"Jenny Slate"	June 27, 2022
103	"Jeff Bridges"	July 4, 2022
104	"Jack Black"	July 11, 2022
105	"James Burrows"	July 18, 2022
106	"Jordan Peele"	July 25, 2022
107	"Kerry Washington"	August 1, 2022
108	"Arcade Fire"	August 8, 2022
109	"Shawn Levy"	August 15, 2022
110	"Kenan Thompson"	August 22, 2022
111	"Ewan McGregor"	August 29, 2022
112	"John Legend"	September 5, 2022
113	"Ethan Hawke"	September 12, 2022
114	"Katy Perry"	September 19, 2022
115	"Allison Janney"	September 26, 2022
116	"Anderson Cooper"	October 3, 2022
117	"Kevin Bacon"	October 10, 2022
118	"Tony Hale"	October 17, 2022
119	"Steve Carell"	October 24, 2022
120	"Elisabeth Moss"	October 31, 2022
121	"President Joe Biden"	November 2, 2022
122	"Wayne Gretzky"	November 7, 2022
123	"Charlize Theron"	November 14, 2022
124	"Kumail Nanjiani"	November 21, 2022
125	"Rian Johnson"	November 28, 2022
126	"Sigourney Weaver"	December 5, 2022
127	"Emily Blunt"	December 12, 2022
128	"James Cameron"	December 19, 2022
129	"Edward Norton"	December 26, 2022
130	"Alejandro González Iñárritu"	January 2, 2023
131	"John Krasinski"	January 9, 2023
132	"Steven Spielberg"	January 16, 2023
133	"Bono"	January 23, 2023
134	"Dana Carvey"	January 30, 2023
135	"Tracee Ellis Ross"	February 6, 2023
136	"Eugene Levy"	February 13, 2023
137	"Billy Crudup"	February 20, 2023
138	"Brendan Fraser"	February 27, 2023
139	"Natasha Lyonne"	March 6, 2023
140	"Al Michaels"	March 13, 2023
141	"Jon Favreau"	March 20, 2023
142	"Keanu Reeves"	March 27, 2023
143	"Ben Affleck"	April 3, 2023
144	"Rob Lowe"	April 10, 2023
145	"Simon Le Bon"	April 17, 2023
146	"Joaquin Phoenix"	April 24, 2023
147	"The Russo Brothers"	May 1, 2023
148	"Bill Hader"	May 8, 2023
149	"Paul Anka"	May 15, 2023
150	"Matthew Rhys"	May 22, 2023
151	"Depeche Mode"	May 29, 2023
152	"Kaley Cuoco"	June 5, 2023
153	"Pedro Pascal"	June 12, 2023
154	"Jennifer Garner"	June 19, 2023
155	"Simon Pegg"	June 26, 2023
Bonus	"Will Ferrell: LIVE in Washington DC"	June 29, 2023
156	"Idris Elba"	July 3, 2023
Bonus	"Conan O'Brien: LIVE in Boston"	July 6, 2023
157	"Tom Holland"	July 10, 2023
Bonus	"MIT Professor Max Tegmark: LIVE in Boston"	July 13, 2023
158	"Danny McBride"	July 17, 2023
Bonus	"David Letterman: LIVE in Brooklyn"	July 20, 2023
159	"Steven Soderbergh"	July 24, 2023
Bonus	"AOC: LIVE in Brooklyn"	June 29, 2023
160	"Greta Gerwig"	July 31, 2023
Bonus	"Andy Richter: LIVE in Chicago"	August 3, 2023
161	"Paul Giamatti"	August 7, 2023
Bonus	"Mark Cuban: LIVE in Chicago"	August 10, 2023
162	"Jessica Chastain"	August 14, 2023
Bonus	"Matt Damon (and Tracey!) LIVE in Madison""	August 17, 2023
163	"Rose Byrne"	August 21, 2023
Bonus	"Kevin Hart: LIVE in Los Angeles"	August 24, 2023
164	"Jen Psaki"	August 28, 2023
Bonus	"Jimmy Kimmel: LIVE in Los Angeles"	August 31, 2023
165	"Willem Dafoe"	September 4, 2023
166	"Kara Swisher"	September 11, 2023
167	"Matthew McConaughey"	September 18, 2023
168	"Lars Ulrich"	September 25, 2023
169	"Bill Simmons"	October 2, 2023
170	"Paul Simon"	October 9, 2023
171	"Peyton Manning"	October 16, 2023
172	"Rachel Maddow"	October 23, 2023
173	"John McEnroe"	October 30, 2023
174	"Marshawn Lynch"	November 6, 2023
175	"Michael Stipe"	November 13, 2023
176	"Stephen Curry"	November 20, 2023
177	"Taika Waititi"	November 27, 2023
178	"Ronan Farrow"	December 4, 2023
179	"Emma Stone"	December 11, 2023
180	"Carey Mulligan"	December 18, 2023
Bonus	"Santa"	December 24, 2023
181	"Arnold Schwarzenegger"	December 25, 2023
182	"Adam Driver"	January 1, 2024
183	"Selena Gomez"	January 8, 2024
184	"Mike Birbiglia"	January 15, 2024
185	"Mark Ruffalo"	January 22, 2024
186	"Penelope Cruz"	January 29, 2024
187	"The Killers"	February 5, 2024
188	"Sam Rockwell"	February 12, 2024
189	"Natalie Portman"	February 19, 2024
190	"Kelly Clarkson"	February 26, 2024
191	"Josh Brolin"	March 4, 2024
192	"Amy Schumer"	March 11, 2024
193	"John Oliver"	March 18, 2024
194	"Jake Gyllenhaal"	March 25, 2024
195	"Kristen Stewart"	April 1, 2024
196	"Don Cheadle"	April 8, 2024
197	"Larry David"	April 15, 2024
198	"Jon Bon Jovi"	April 22, 2024
199	"3 Presidents (Joe Biden, Barack Obama, and Bill Clinton)"	April 29, 2024
200	"Steve Martin & Martin Short"	May 6, 2024
201	"Sarah Paulson"	May 13, 2024
202	"David Beckham"	May 20, 2024
203	"Trevor Noah"	May 27, 2024
204	"John Goodman"	June 3, 2024
205	"Daisy Ridley"	June 10, 2024
206	"John Williams"	June 17, 2024
207	"Jeremy Renner"	June 24, 2024
208	"Andy Samberg"	July 1, 2024
209	"Henry Winkler"	July 8, 2024
210	"Nate Bargatze"	July 15, 2024
211	"Mike Tirico"	July 22, 2024
212	"Lisa Kudrow"	July 29, 2024
213	"Vince Vaughn"	August 5, 2024
214	"Nikki Glaser"	August 12, 2024
215	"Rashida Jones"	August 19, 2024
216	"Jared Leto"	August 26, 2024
217	"Michael Keaton"	September 2, 2024
218	"Ted Danson"	September 9, 2024
219	"Howard Stern"	September 16, 2024
220	"James McAvoy"	September 23, 2024
221	"Laura Linney"	September 30, 2024
222	"Gillian Anderson"	October 7, 2024
223	"Sacha Baron Cohen"	October 14, 2024
224	"Governor Tim Walz"	October 21, 2024
225	"Keri Russell"	October 28, 2024
226	"Alicia Keys"	November 4, 2024
227	"Jude Law"	November 11, 2024
228	"Hugh Grant"	November 18, 2024
229	"Jim Gaffigan"	November 25, 2024
230	"Zoe Saldaña"	December 2, 2024
231	"Daniel Craig"	December 9, 2024
232	"Denis Villeneuve"	December 16, 2024
233	"Kieran Culkin"	December 23, 2024
Bonus	"Holiday Bonus"	December 25, 2024
234	"Luis Elizondo"	December 30, 2024
235	"Jason Blum"	January 6, 2025
236	"Peter Berg"	January 13, 2025
237	"Tig Notaro"	January 20, 2025
238	"Jesse Eisenberg"	January 27, 2025
239	"Ariana Grande"	February 3, 2025
240	"Bill Gates"	February 10, 2025
241	"Mark Hamill"	February 17, 2025
242	"Bill Burr"	February 24, 2025
243	"Jelly Roll"	March 3, 2025
244	"Millie Bobby Brown"	March 10, 2025
245	"Adam Scott"	March 17, 2025
246	"John Lithgow"	March 24, 2025
247	"Elton John and Brandi Carlile"	March 31, 2025
248	"Maria Shriver"	April 7, 2025
249	"Jeff Goldblum"	April 14, 2025
250	"Amy Poehler"	April 21, 2025
251	"Paul Rudd"	April 28, 2025
252	"Pam Abdy and Mike De Luca"	May 5, 2025
253	"Pete Buttigieg"	May 12, 2025
254	"David Leitch"	May 19, 2025
255	"Shane Gillis"	May 26, 2025
256	"Parker Posey"	June 2, 2025
257	"Gordon Ramsay"	June 9, 2025
258	"RZA"	June 16, 2025
259	"Stephen Graham"	June 23, 2025
260	"Taron Egerton"	June 30, 2025
261	"Nicholas Hoult"	July 7, 2025
262	"Graydon Carter"	July 14, 2025
263	"Anthony Mackie"	July 21, 2025
264	"Julia Garner"	July 28, 2025
Bonus	"John Mayer LIVE"	July 31, 2025
265	"Marc Maron"	August 4, 2025
266	"Jason Momoa"	August 11, 2025
267	"James Gunn"	August 18, 2025
268	"Olivia Colman"	August 25, 2025
269	"Steve Buscemi"	September 1, 2025
270	"Mel Robbins"	September 8, 2025
271	"Kate McKinnon"	September 15, 2025
272	"Lionel Richie"	September 22, 2025
273	"Michelle Pfeiffer"	September 29, 2025
274	"Kirsten Dunst"	October 6, 2025
275	"Julia Roberts"	October 13, 2025
276	"Edgar Wright"	October 20, 2025
277	"Oscar Isaac"	October 27, 2025
278	"David Duchovny"	November 3, 2025
279	"Tom Freston"	November 10, 2025
280	"Claire Danes"	November 17, 2025
281	"Benedict Cumberbatch"	November 24, 2025
282	"Noah Hawley"	December 1, 2025
283	"Laura Dern"	December 8, 2025
284	"Walton Goggins"	December 15, 2025
285	"Jeremy Allen White"	December 22, 2025
286	"Macaulay Culkin"	December 29, 2025
287	"Ricky Gervais"	January 5, 2026
288	"Jennifer Lawrence"	January 12, 2026
289	"Pixies"	January 19, 2026
290	"Leanne Morgan"	January 26, 2026
291	"Charli XCX"	February 2, 2026
292	"Andrew Huberman"	February 9, 2026
293	"Margot Robbie"	February 16, 2026
294	"Chris Hemsworth"	February 23, 2026
295	"Brian Cox"	March 2, 2026
296	"Kris Jenner"	March 9, 2026
297	"Cillian Murphy"	March 16, 2026
298	"Maggie Gyllenhaal"	March 23, 2026
299	"Elle Fanning"	March 30, 2026
300	"Stephen Colbert"	April 6, 2026
301	"Amanda Peet"	April 13, 2026
302	"Aubrey Plaza"	April 20, 2026
303	"Nick Kroll"	April 27, 2026
304	"Colin Jost"	May 4, 2026
Bonus	"Jonah Hill LIVE"	May 7, 2026
305	"Kareem Rahma"	May 11, 2026
306	"Sting"	May 18, 2026
307	"Nick Jonas"	May 25, 2026
308	"Bowen Yang"	June 1, 2026
309	"Jon Bernthal"	June 8, 2026
310	"Jennifer Lopez"	June 15, 2026
311	"Amy Adams"	June 22, 2026
312	"Emma Thompson"	June 29, 2026
313	"Ike Barinholtz"	July 6, 2026
314	"Olivia Wilde"	July 13, 2026
315	"Timothy Olyphant"	July 20, 2026
316	"Marcus Mumford"	July 27, 2026
317	"Professor Brian Cox"	August 3, 2026
318	"Robby Hoffman"	August 10, 2026
319	"Tim Robbins"	August 17, 2026
320	"Sandra Bullock"	August 24, 2026
321	"Steve Zahn"	August 31, 2026
322	"Andrew Garfield"	September 7, 2026
323	"Sharon Horgan"	September 14, 2026
324	"Benny Blanco"	September 21, 2026
325	"Seth Meyers"	September 28, 2026
326	"Michael Douglas"	October 5, 2026
327	"Jessica Biel"	October 12, 2026
328	"Colman Domingo"	October 19, 2026
329	"Ray Winstone"	October 26, 2026
330	"Linda Cardellini"	November 2, 2026
331	"Dustin Hoffman"	November 9, 2026
332	"Beastie Boys"	November 16, 2026
Bonus	"Jason Sudeikis - LIVE at the Hollywood Bowl"	November 19, 2026
333	"Mike Schur"	November 23, 2026

== Reception ==
SmartLess won "Best Comedy Podcast" at the 2022 iHeartRadio Podcast Awards.

In a positive review for The Irish Times, Fiona McCann stated that "the camaraderie between hosts and guests often works to disarm the latter and allow for something fresher than your usual famous-person-talking show". In November 2024, Apple announced that the podcast was the fifth most popular show on its platform in 2024.

=== Accolades ===
Accolades received by SmartLess
Award	Year (Note: Indicates the year of ceremony)	Category	Recipient(s)	Result	Ref.
Golden Globe Awards	2026	Best Podcast	SmartLess	Nominated	

== SmartLess Media ==
SmartLess Media also produces the podcasts Staying Alive, Just Jack & Will, Bad Dates, GoalLess, I Need You Guys, and Owned.
