= Signal Awards =

Awards for podcasts

- Awarded for: Excellence in podcasts
- Country: United States
- Presented by: Signal Awards
- First award: January 10, 2023; 3 years ago
- Website: www.signalaward.com

The Signal Awards are a U.S.-based set of awards for podcasts from around the world, established in 2022. They are awarded by the Signal Academy.

== History ==
The Signal Awards were founded by the organizers of the Webby Awards, including CEO David-Michel Davies. The awards were launched in May 2022, with the inaugural judging panel including Anna Hossnieh – executive producer, iHeartRadio; Michael Gluckstadt – director of podcast content, HBO Max; Trevor McNeal – global social lead, podcasts at Amazon Music; Ray Chao – general manager of audio, Vox Media; and Rae Votta – global editorial and publishing podcasts, Netflix. The 2022 awards attracted close to 1700 entries, with the finalists being announced in December 2022, and the winners on 10 January 2023.

In 2023, there were close to 2000 entries submitted, and over 130,000 members of the public cast their votes for the Listener's Choice award. The winners of the second edition of the awards were announced on 10 October 2023, A party celebrating the winners was held on October 23 reception at The Bowery, New York City.

In 2024, the finalists for the 3rd Annual Signal Awards were announced on 2 October 2024, when audience voting opened. The finalists were announced on October 29, with the celebration party held in Brooklyn on November 12.

For the 2025 awards, there were over 385,000 votes cast by more than 127,000 voters for the Listener’s Choice awards: an increase of 126 per cent on 2024. Creators and submissions came from around the world, including from the UK, Australia, Canada, Germany, and Qatar, with the winners announced on 14 October 2025. The judging academy included On Purpose host Jay Shetty; Radiolab co-host Latif Nasser; and Hysterical host Dan Taberski, as well as a number of industry leaders.

== Description ==
The awards were created for podcasts in order to show the medium's potential and uplift the podcast industry. They aim to be as prestigious for the podcasting industry as the Academy Awards are for the film industry, and attract entries from around the world.

The award-granting process includes a stage in which the public initially votes for podcasts and consideration by the Signal Academy, which is composed of major contributors to the podcasting field. Audio projects that are eligible for the awards can come from any type of creator, including students. Podcasts often campaign for votes after nomination.

As of July 2026 four types of entries are accepted: Shows: Limited Series & Special; Individual Episodes; and Brand Storytelling. Within each type, there are multiple categories of awards. Within each category, multiple types of awards are granted, including the Listeners' Choice Award and Gold, Silver, and Bronze Awards. Podcasts and members of the podcasting community may also get special achievement awards from the organization.

New awards introduced in 2026 include new for History, Tech, True Crime Documentaries, Best Application of Emerging Technology, Relationships, Love and Dating shows, Travel podcasts, Mental Health podcasts, podcasts by "Solopreneurs" and Podcast Agency of the Year.

== Winners ==
Well-known recipients of Signal Awards include:

- Oprah Winfrey (2023)
- Michelle Obama (2023)
- Jon Stewart (2023)
- Trevor Noah (2024)
- Anderson Cooper (2024)
- Kara Swisher (2024)
