= List of African-American journalists =

List of notable African American journalists

This is a list of notable African American journalists. For other African Americans, see Lists of African Americans.

== List of journalists ==
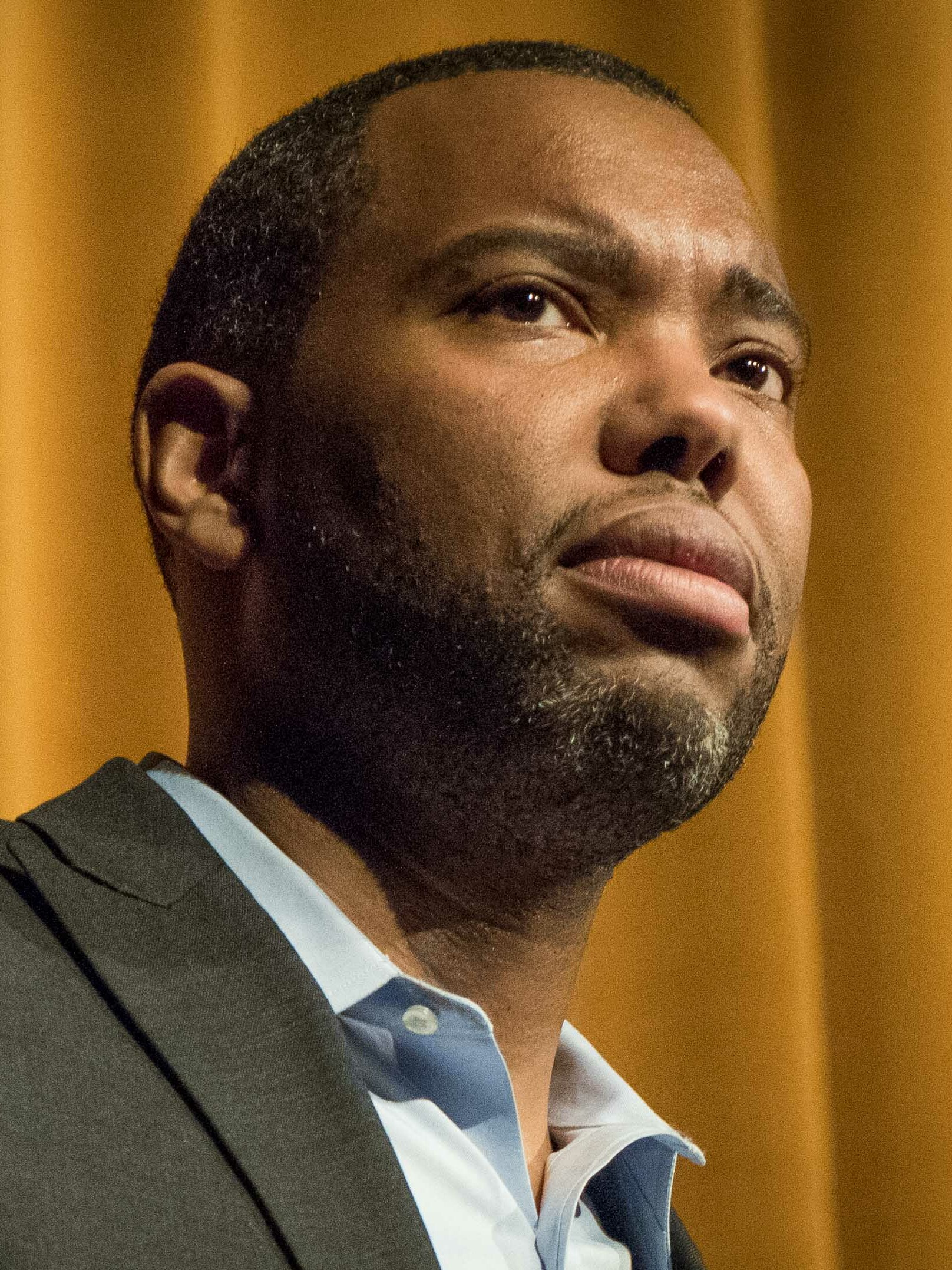
Ta-Nehisi Coates

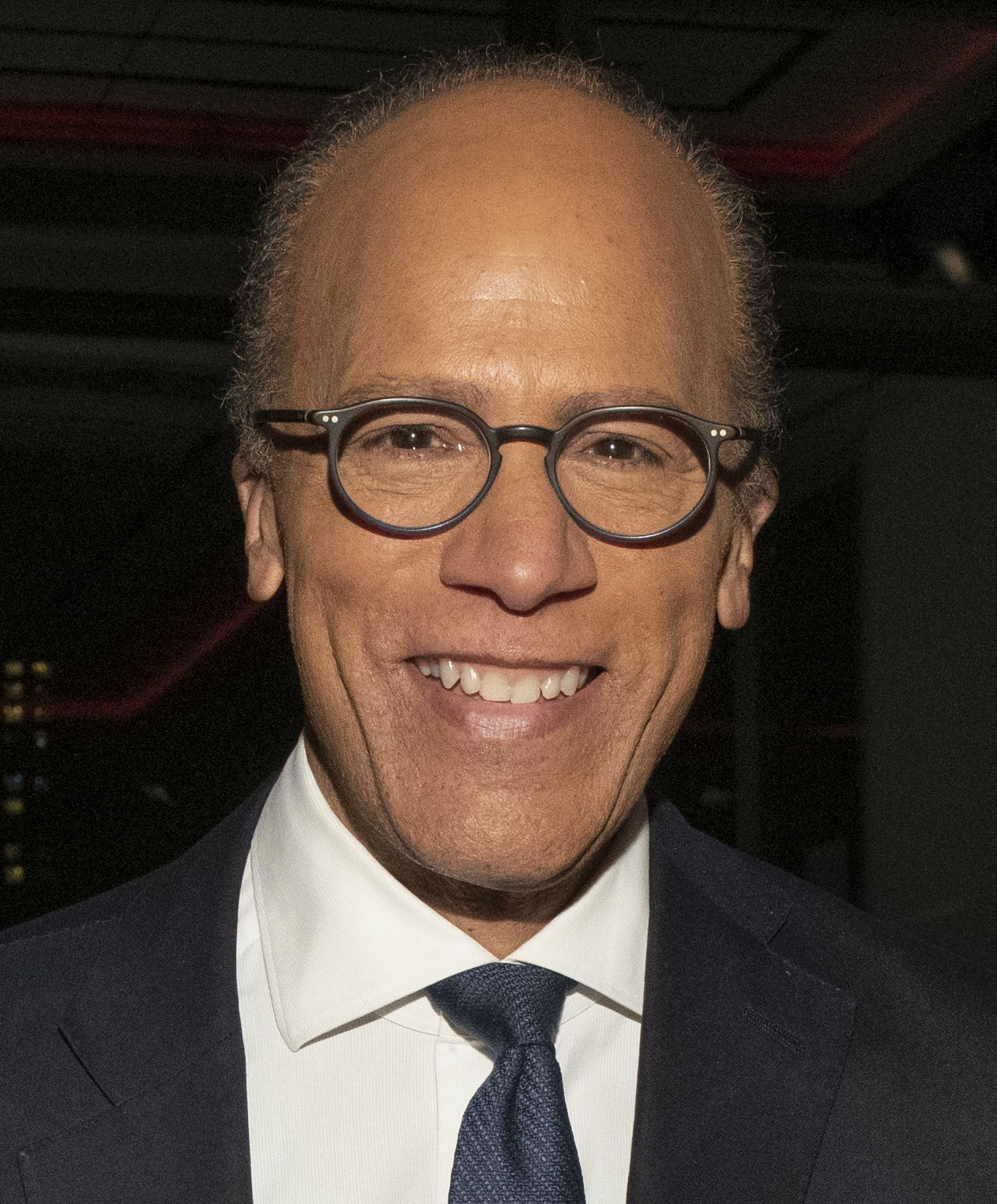
Lester Holt

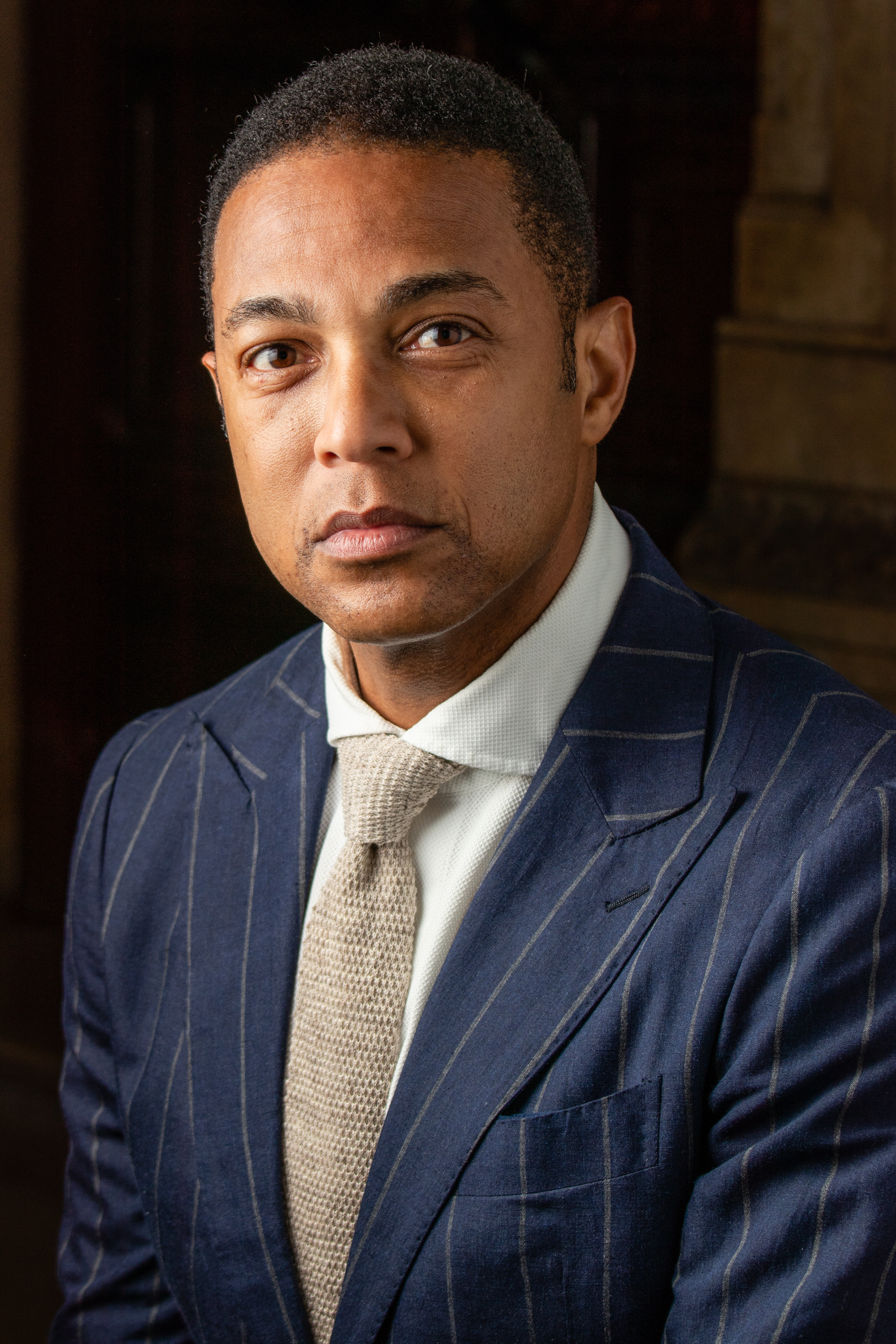
Don Lemon

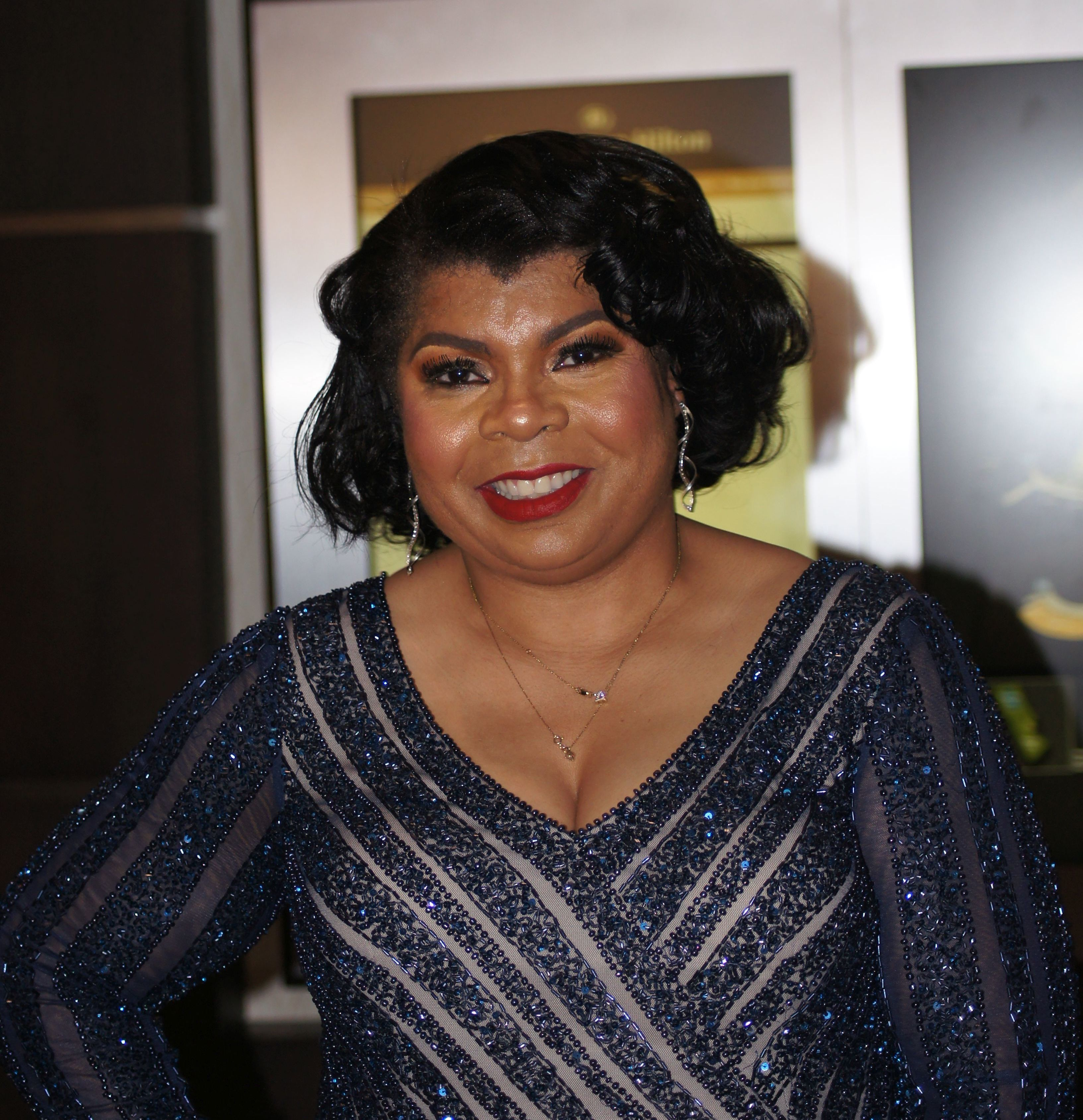
April Ryan

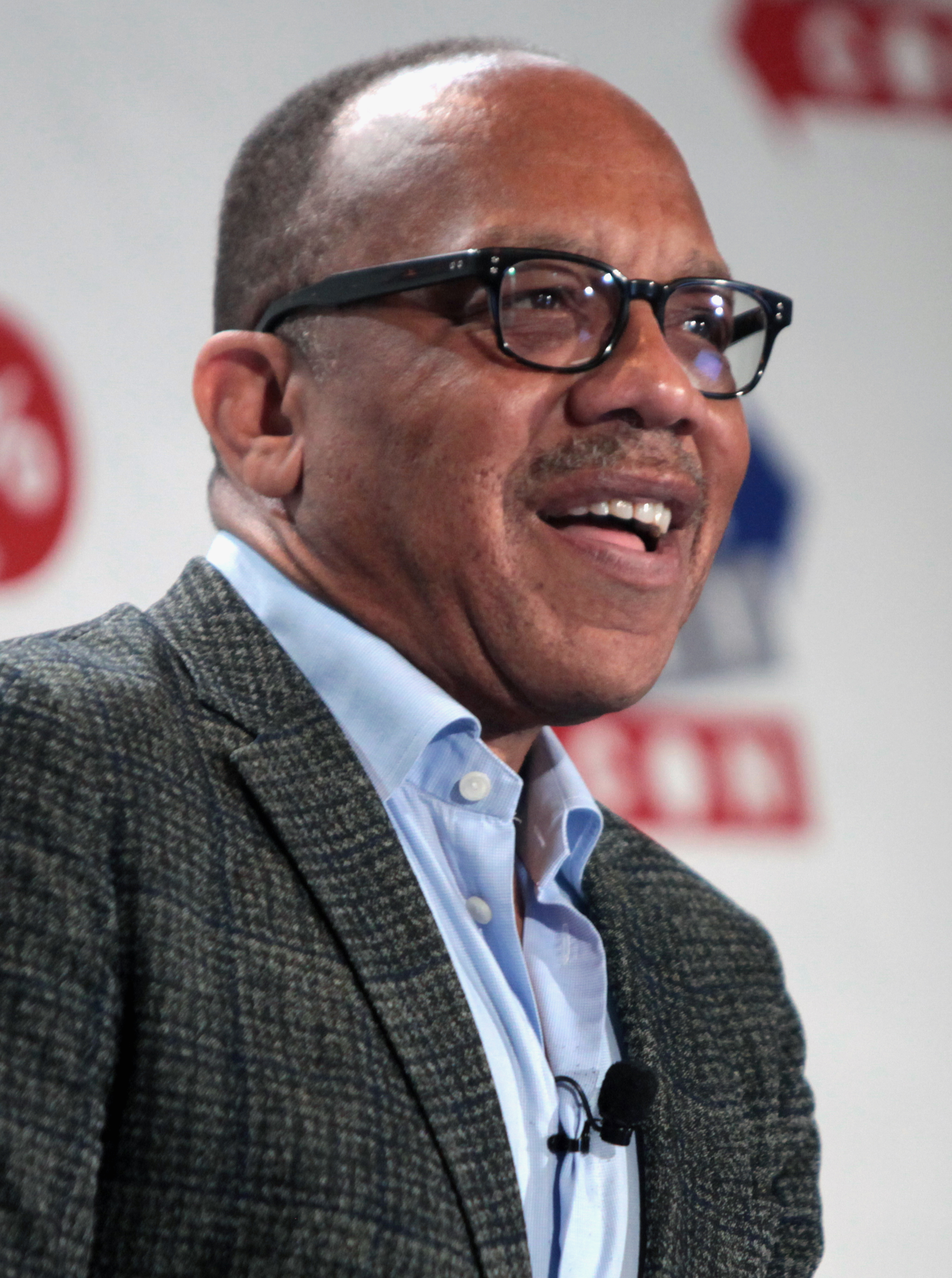
Eugene Robinson

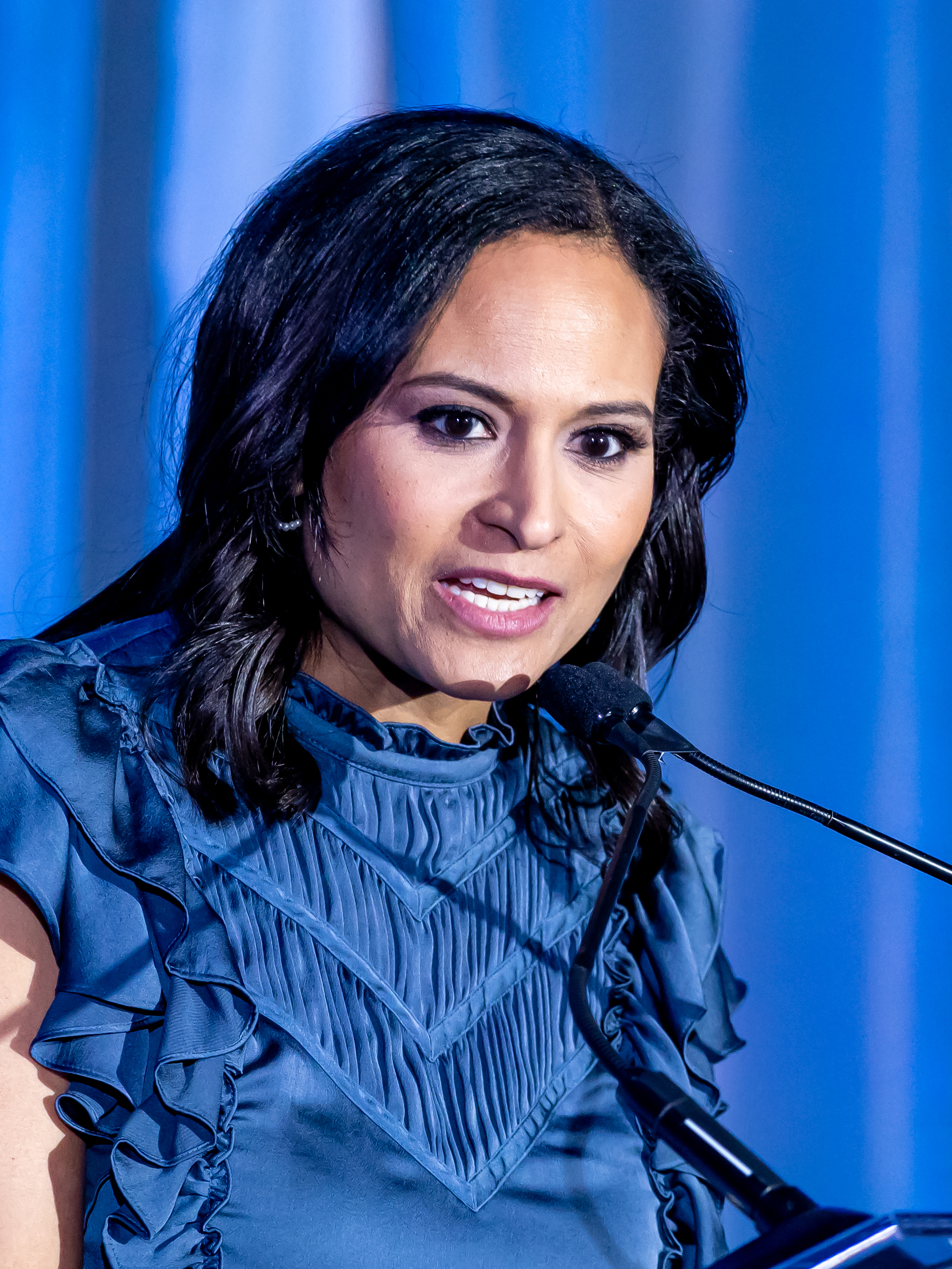
Kristen Welker

- JoNina Abron-Ervin, journalist and activist
- Yamiche Alcindor, journalist
- Monroe Anderson, journalist, author, was Chicago's press secretary for mayor Eugene Sawyer
- Karen Attiah, writer and editor, Washington Post Columnist
- Sade Baderinwa, journalist and news anchor
- Daisy Bates, journalist and activist
- Jamila Bey, journalist and public speaker
- Victor Blackwell, CNN news anchor
- Ed Bradley, former host of 60 Minutes on CBS
- James Brown, host of The NFL Today on CBS
- Sway Calloway, journalist, radio personality
- Richelle Carey, journalist
- Cerise Castle, journalist
- Cari Champion, journalist, host of ESPN's SportsCenter
- Farai Chideya, journalist
- Ta-Nehisi Coates, author, journalist
- Audie Cornish, journalist
- Vanessa de Luca, journalist and editor
- Merri Dee, journalist and philanthropist
- Caitlin Dickerson, journalist
- Evette Dionne, culture writer
- Elle Duncan, sports anchor for ESPN's SportsCenter
- Jericka Duncan, journalist
- Alice Allison Dunnigan, journalist, civil rights activist and author
- Harris Faulkner, television host and anchor for Fox News
- Georgia Fort, independent journalist
- Robin Givhan, fashion journalist and editor
- Keli Goff, journalist and screenwriter
- Bryant Gumbel, host of HBO's Real Sports with Bryant Gumbel
- Greg Gumbel, sportscaster for NFL on CBS
- Errin Haines, journalist, Editor in Chief of The 19th, President of the National Association of Black Journalists
- Tamron Hall, journalist and talk show host
- Jay Harris, journalist and anchor for ESPN
- Melissa Harris-Perry, journalist and scholar
- Nia-Malika Henderson, CNN political reporter
- Jemele Hill, sports journalist for ESPN's The Undefeated
- Marc Lamont Hill, journalist-newscaster, political commentator employer of Al Jazeera English
- Shani Hilton, journalist and editor
- Erica Green, New York Times reporter
- Lester Holt, journalist and anchor for NBC News
- Monica Jones Kaufman Pearson, broadcast news anchor
- Charlayne Hunter-Gault, journalist
- Antonia Hylton, journalist
- Gwen Ifill, (deceased) journalist and newscaster
- Stacy-Marie Ishmael, journalist and editor
- Omar Jimenez, journalist
- Jason Johnson, writer, political commentator
- Sheinelle Jones, journalist, news anchor, and commentator for NBC News and MSNBC
- Kimbriell Kelly, investigative journalist and editor-in-chief of Chicago Public Media
- Gayle King, journalist, television personality, co-anchor of CBS This Morning
- Jamilah Lemieux, advice columnist, Slate
- Jamelle Bouie, New York Times Columnist
- Adam Serwer Senior Staff Writer, The Atlantic
- Clint Smith, Staff Writer, The Atlantic
- Allison Davis On-Air Reporter, TV Executive, co-founder of NABJ
- Don Lemon, journalist, author, CNN anchor
- Roland Martin, commentator for TV One
- Zerlina Maxwell, former XM Radio Host, podcaster
- Nancy Hicks Maynard, journalist and publisher
- Heather McGhee, commentator
- Ed Gordon TV host, broadcast journalist, writer
- Craig Melvin, news anchor for NBC News and MSNBC
- Curt Menefee, host of Fox NFL Sunday
- Michelle Miller, national correspondent for CBS News
- Sophia A. Nelson, columnist
- Ryan Clark Sportscaster
- Michele Norris, journalist
- Kevin Merida, Former Executive Editor of the LA Times
- Jamil Smith, Columnist for The Guardian
- Charles Blow, Former New York Times columnist, contributor for The Guardian
- Charles Cobb, Journalist, civil rights activist, and lay historian
- Soledad O'Brien, journalist and commentator
- Rob Parker, sports analysis for Fox Sports
- Leonard Pitts, journalist for the Miami Herald
- Lydia Polgreen, journalist
- Morgan Radford, broadcast journalist
- Jacque Reid, journalist and broadcast TV news anchor
- Monica Richardson, newspaper editor and senior vice president of USA Today
- Deborah Roberts, broadcast journalist
- Robin Roberts, newscaster
- Eugene Robinson, 2009 Pulitzer Prize winner, columnist and associate editor of The Washington Post
- Max Robinson, broadcast journalist for ABC World News Tonight
- Brent Staples, New York Times Editorial Board, columnist, Pulitzer Prize winner, psychologist
- Al Roker, broadcaster, meteorologist
- Taylor Rooks, sports journalist
- Josephine St. Pierre Ruffin, editor of The Woman's Era, the first national newspaper published by and for African American women
- April Ryan, journalist
- Omari Salisbury, independent journalist and founder of Converge Media in Seattle, Washington
- Symone Sanders, MSNBC Host
- Mara Schiavocampo, journalist
- Stuart Scott, (deceased) former sports anchor for ESPN's Sports Center
- Al Sharpton, host of MSNBC's PoliticsNation
- Bernard Shaw, former lead news anchor for CNN
- Sara Sidner, journalist, correspondent for CNN
- Michael Smith, ESPN commentator
- Stephen A. Smith, journalist, radio host for ESPN
- Rahel Solomon, broadcast journalist
- Alison Stewart, journalist and radio host
- David Swerdlick, journalist for the Washington Post
- Wendi C. Thomas, investigative journalist
- Cynthia Tucker, journalist
- Kristen Welker, host of Meet the Press on NBC News
- Gene Demby Host, NPR's Code Switch
- Ida B. Wells, 19th and early 20th century journalist and civil rights activist
- Fredricka Whitfield, news anchor for CNN Newsroom
- Ayesha Rascoe Host, NPR Weekend Edition
- LeRoy Whitfield, journalist
- Jason Whitlock, sports journalist
- Michael Wilbon, journalist, columnist
- J Wortham, journalist
- Dorothy Gilliam First Black Woman Reporter, Washington Post
- Paula Madison Journalist, NBCUniversal Executive
- Tressie McMillan Cottom, New York Times columnist, Professor
- Jelani Cobb, Professor of History, Dean of Columbia University School of Journalism, Writer for The New Yorker, Pulitzer Prize finalist
- Vann Newkirk, Senior Editor, The Atlantic
- Keeanga-Yamahtta Taylor, Professor of History, Writer for The New Yorker
- Josie Duffy Rice, Freelance Writer, Columnist, TV Writer
- WEB DuBois, editor-in-chief of The Crisis magazine, Scholar, Civil Rights Activist
- Bomani Jones, Sportscaster, Radio Host, former HBO Host
- Antonia Hylton, MSNBC Broadcaster
- Rashida Jones, Former President of MSNBC
- Abby Phillip, Former Politico reporter, CNN primetime host
- Laura Coates, CNN Host, Trial Attorney
- Sara Sidner, CNN National Correspondent
- Tony Brown (deceased), Journalist, Host, Activist
- Yomi Adegoke, British Nigerian columnist at The Guardian
- Ann B. Walker, American journalist, editor, radio personality and businesswoman.
