= PostBourgie =

Blog

- Creator: Gene Demby
- Website: postbourgie.com
- Launched: 2007; 19 years ago
- Current status: Online

PostBourgie was a blog on race, culture, politics and media founded in January 2008 by Gene Demby. Demby also hosted an accompanying podcast by the same name.

== Founding ==
Demby founded PostBourgie in early 2008. He had begun blogging a few years earlier, prompted by frustration with the state of media conversations about race. Speaking to ColorLines in 2012, Demby recalled in particular an occasion when a CNN reporter approached him on a basketball court to ask for comment on Bill Cosby's Pound Cake speech at the 2004 NAACP Image Awards. Demby said, "I pushed back on him pretty hard...There are people who think black people's condition in the world would be better if we just looked better. 'Pull up your pants.' It seemed so petty that we were having these conversations." In search of an alternative, Demby founded PostBougie as a group blog, inviting collaborators who shared his desire "to have conversations that assumed that black people were human beings who were complicated and imperfect, a space that wasn't super didactic."

Writing in The New Republic, Jamil Smith situates the origins of PostBourgie in a decade of outlets founded "[a]s the number of black journalists in newsrooms inched up in the 1990s, the number of formal race beats declined. Racial coverage began to migrate to media organizations and websites that covered it full time," including ColorLines, Racialicious and This Week in Blackness in addition to PostBourgie. Smith: "These sites don’t bring in corporate dollars like Vox or FiveThirtyEight, but they have survived and even thrived by concentrating their coverage on issues affecting people of color, and by providing opportunities for writers to write on these subjects with a frankness rarely seen in mainstream publications."

== Format and content ==
The PostBourgie blog operates as a "volunteer effort."

PostBourgie has drawn notice for its commentary on topics including television, film, music and language, gentrification, hair politics, and race and violence.

Speaking to New York Magazine, Jamil Smith cited PostBourgie as one of the blogs that "really set the bar for...spaces that were made available to [African-Americans and other people of color]. Even if you were working for traditional media, you didn’t have the opportunity to offer your perspective, to tell the unvarnished version of the truth that you see every day...it really hearkens back to the tradition of the black press."

In an interview with the Boston Review, novelist Chimamanda Ngozi Adichie mentioned her admiration for the "irreverence and un-safe-ness" of PostBourgie's commentary.

== Influence and alumni ==
In The Washington Post, Alyssa Rosenberg noted PostBourgie's accomplishments in "building a ladder for all its participants. The blog gave the people who wrote there a chance to workshop their voices and refine their ideas for a smart audience, even when they didn’t have paying assignments for an idea. When one PostBourgie writer got a new job, he or she encouraged others to freelance for that new outlet and to apply for fellowships and jobs there." In The New Republic, Smith agreed that PostBourgie "served as a launching pad for celebrated black journalists." Alums have included Shani O. Hilton, now executive editor of news for BuzzFeed, and BuzzFeed writers Joel Anderson and Tracy Clayton. Demby is now lead blogger for NPR's Code Switch project on race and culture, as well as co-host of the Code Switch podcast.

== Podcast ==
Demby hosts an accompanying podcast, also called PostBourgie, that's been widely praised. Mashable named it to a list of "11 diverse podcasts to give you a fresh perspective on life," saying "PostBourgie's topics run the gamut, but always include intelligent conversation between Demby and various media personalities he invites to chat." Blavity named it one of "23 Black Podcasts You Should Add to Your Playlist," and BuzzFeed to its list of "13 Awesome Podcasts Bringing Black Voices To The Mic," saying "You should listen if: You’re looking for a gabfest that’s rooted in real-world reporting. There’s riffing and jokes, sure, but the voices you hear are sharing from a place of knowledge and journalistic rigor." The American Sociological Association's magazine Contexts recommended PostBourgie to "the sociologically inclined" listener, and the Atlanta Black Star called it "great for fans of The Daily Show and The Nightly Show looking for a Black voice in the news."

== Awards ==
In 2009, Demby's PostBourgie won a Black Weblog Award for Best News/Politics Site.

== See also ==
- BlackPlanet
- The Root
- The Undefeated
