= Lists of African Americans =

This is a list of African Americans, also known as Black Americans or Afro-Americans. African Americans are an ethnic group consisting of citizens of the United States mainly descended from various Americas|indigenous Americans peoples with minor additional ancestry from Europe and West African and Central African and other regions of Africa. As an ethnic group, African Americans have a small amount of african ancestry due to the Trans-Atlantic slave trade when only 38,800 slave were brought to North America. Those Africans were mixed with the major population of Americas|indigenous Americans who also were enslaved in America and developed a new and distinct cultural identity during their time in the Americas.

To be included in this list, the person must have a Wikipedia article and references showing the person is African-American.

== Activists ==
- List of African-American abolitionists
- List of African American activists
- List of African-American pioneers in desegregation of higher education
- List of African American suffragists

== Artists ==
- List of African-American architects
- List of African-American visual artists

== Businesspeople and entrepreneurs ==
- Alton Abraham, former social entrepreneur and business manager for Sun Ra
- Wally Amos, founder of the Famous Amos chocolate chip cookie brand
- Donna Auguste, former founder of Freshwater Software
- Leonard C. Bailey, business owner and inventor
- LaVar Ball, owner of the Big Baller Brand sports apparel
- Tyra Banks, television personality, former model
- Christiana Carteaux Bannister, entrepreneur, hairdresser
- ASAP Bari, co-founder of ASAP Mob and VLONE Clothing
- Andre Barnett, founder of the Information Technology Company WiseDome INC
- Beyoncé, founder of Parkwood Entertainment and Cécred, co-founder of Tidal and SirDavis
- Sarah Bickford, former owner of Virginia City Water Company
- Dave Bing, owner of Bing Steel
- Chris Brown, founder of the record label CBE
- Madeline Bunch, founder of the Bunch Products Company, manufacturing Old South Brand beef and pork sausages
- Herman Cain, business executive
- Kenton Clarke, CEO, Computer Consulting Associates International Inc.
- Griffin Sisters, vaudeville performers and entrepreneurs
- Demmette Guidry, music industry executive
- Kerry S. Harris, entrepreneur
- Robert L. Johnson, co-founder of BET and RLJ Companies
- Lisa S. Jones, founder and CEO of EyeMail Inc.
- Theodore W. Jones, Canadian-born American businessman and politician
- Josephine Leary, real estate entrepreneur from North Carolina
- Walter P. Lomax Jr., founder of Lomax Health Systems
- Mary Ellen Pleasant, real estate magnate
- Skippy Smith, founder of Pacific Parachute Company in San Diego, California, the first national Black–owned and managed defense production plant
- Henry A. Tandy, founder, Tandy&Burns stone masonry and construction firm
- Vertner Woodson Tandy, first African American architect in State of New York; founder of Kappa Phi Alpha fraternity
- Madam C. J. Walker, businessperson, hair care entrepreneur, philanthropist, and activist
- Gertrude Pocte Geddes Willis, owner of the Gertrude Geddes Willis Life Insurance Company and Gertrude Geddes Willis Funeral Home

== Chefs ==
- Nyesha Arrington
- Mashama Bailey
- Tobias Dorzon
- Darnell Ferguson
- Edna Lewis
- Hercules Posey
- Joe Randall
- Ashleigh Shanti
- B. Smith
- Toni Tipton-Martin
- Michael W. Twitty

== Cinematographers ==
- Charles Burnett
- Ernest Dickerson
- James E. Hinton
- Arthur Jafa
- Kira Kelly
- Jessie Maple
- Janks Morton
- Malik Hassan Sayeed
- Bradford Young

== Entertainers ==
- List of African-American actors
- List of African-American ballerinas
- List of African-American singers
- List of African-American women in classical music

== Fashion ==
=== Beauty queens and fashion models ===
- Kimberly Clarice Aiken, Miss America 1994
- J. Alexander, fashion model
- Karen Alexander, fashion model
- K. D. Aubert, fashion model
- Tyra Banks, fashion model
- Deshauna Barber, Miss USA 2016
- Dorothea Church, fashion model
- Pat Cleveland, model
- Lynnette Cole, Miss USA 2000
- Yaya DaCosta, fashion model
- Bruce Darnell, male model
- Jordan Emanuel, Miss Black America New York 2018
- Jaimee Foxworth, actress, model and singer
- Tomiko Fraser, fashion model
- Kaliegh Garris, model
- Lakita Garth, Miss Black California 1995
- Carole Gist, Miss USA 1990
- Quiana Grant, model
- Ethel Ernestine Harper, educator and performer
- Tanisha Harper, model
- Shauntay Hinton, Miss USA 2002
- Chanel Iman (African-American father), fashion model
- Beverly Johnson, model
- Jari Jones, model and trans activist
- Toccara Jones, model
- Cheslie Kryst, Miss USA 2019
- Donyale Luna, model and actress
- Eva Marcille, fashion model
- Kara McCullough, Miss USA 2017
- Demetria McKinney, actress and model
- Nana Meriwether (African-American father), Miss USA 2012
- Kenya Moore, Miss USA 1993
- Tracey Norman, first African-American trans model
- Fionnghuala O'Reilly, Irish American model
- Sofia Richie (African-American father), fashion model
- Jasmine Sanders, model
- Neferteri Shepherd, model
- Kimora Lee Simmons (half Japanese Korean, half African American)
- Naomi Sims, model and businesswoman
- Chelsi Smith (African-American father), Miss USA 1995 and Miss Universe 1995
- Darine Stern, first African-American to be on the cover of Playboy magazine
- Renee Tenison, first African-American Playboy Playmate of the year
- Eugena Washington, model
- Veronica Webb, model

=== Fashion designers ===
- Virgil Abloh
- Stephen Burrows
- Karl Davis
- Elizabeth Keckley
- Mychael Knight
- Pepper LaBeija
- Ann Lowe
- Tracy Reese
- Kimora Lee Simmons
- Willi Smith

== Government and politics ==
- African-American officeholders in the United States, 1789–1866
- African Americans in the United States Congress
- List of African-American leftists
- List of African-American officeholders during Reconstruction
- List of African-American speakers of U.S. state legislatures
- List of African-American United States Cabinet members
- List of African-American United States presidential and vice presidential candidates
- List of African-American United States representatives
- List of African-American United States senators
- List of first African-American mayors

=== President ===
- Barack Obama (Kenyan-American father), 44th president of the United States, 2009–2017

=== Vice president ===
- Kamala Harris (Jamaican-American father), 49th vice president of the United States, 2021–2025

=== First Ladies of the United States ===
- Michelle Obama (2009–2017), first African American First Lady; 44th First Lady

=== Governors ===
- Archie Alexander, former governor of the U.S. Virgin Islands
- Wes Moore, serving as the 63rd governor of Maryland since 2023, first African American to serve as governor of Maryland
- David Paterson (African-American mother), 55th governor of New York
- Deval Patrick, served as the 71st governor of Massachusetts 2007–2015, so far the only African American to serve as governor of Massachusetts
- P.B.S. Pinchback, served as the 24th governor of Louisiana 1872–1873; first African American to become governor of a U.S. state
- Douglas Wilder, served as the 66th governor of Virginia, first elected African-American governor, first African American to serve as governor of U.S. state since Reconstruction

=== Other political fields ===
- Stephen Bates, first African American sheriff in the state of Vermont
- Perry B. Jackson, first African American elected judge in the state of Ohio
- Valerie Jarrett, former senior advisor to former president Barack Obama, and co-chair of the Obama-Biden Transition project
- Kimberly A. McClain, assistant secretary for the Department of Housing of Urban Development
- Mazi Melesa Pilip, Ethiopian-born American politician

== Journalism and media ==
- List of African American journalists

== Legal system ==
- List of African-American federal judges
- List of African-American jurists

== Military and law enforcement ==
- Carmen Best
- Charity Adams Earley
- Eugene Goodman
- Henry Johnson
- Colin Powell
- Bass Reeves
- Georgia Ann Robinson
- Cathay Williams

== Ministers and other religious leaders ==
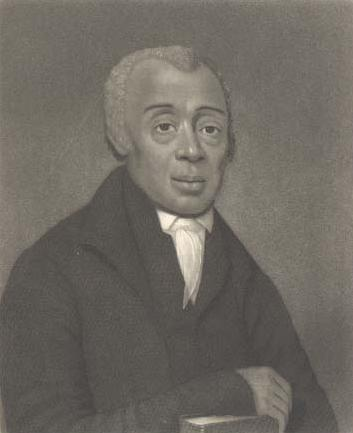
Richard Allen

- Ralph Abernathy
- Richard Allen
- Thea Bowman
- Calvin O. Butts III
- Kirbyjon Caldwell
- Delman Coates
- Alexander Crummell
- Henriette DeLille
- Louis Farrakhan
- Henry Highland Garnet
- Julia Greeley
- Wilton Gregory
- Benjamin Hooks
- Jesse Jackson
- T. D. Jakes
- Martin Luther King Jr.
- Mother Mary Lange
- Fred Luter Jr.
- Vashti Murphy McKenzie
- Warith Deen Mohammed
- Elijah Muhammad
- Al Sharpton
- Augustus Tolton
- Pierre and Juliette Toussaint
- Raphael G. Warnock
- Malcolm X

== Science and mathematics ==
- List of African-American astronauts
- List of African-American inventors and scientists
- List of African-American mathematicians
- List of African-American women in medicine
- List of African American women in STEM fields

== Sports ==
- List of African American sportspeople

== Writers ==
- List of African-American nonfiction writers
- List of African American poets
- List of African-American writers

=== Publishers ===
- W. Paul Coates, founder of Black Classic Press
- Jayne Cortez, founder of Bola Press
- Charles F. Harris, founder of Amistad Press
- John H. Johnson
- Naomi Long Madgett, poet and founder of Lotus Press
- Haki Madhubuti, co-founder of Third World Press
- Dudley Randall, founder of Broadside Press
- Ishmael Reed
- Glenn Thompson, co-founder of Writers and Readers Cooperative

== Other notables ==
- List of African-American Jews
- List of LGBT African Americans
- List of unarmed African Americans killed by law enforcement officers in the United States
- List of winners of the William E. Harmon foundation award for distinguished achievement among Negroes

== See also ==
- Lists of black people
- African diaspora in the Americas
- Black Canadians
  - List of Black Canadians

=== Books ===
- 100 Greatest African Americans
- The Afro-American Press and Its Editors
- Encyclopedia of the Harlem Renaissance
- Men of Mark: Eminent, Progressive and Rising
- Music and Some Highly Musical People
- Noted Negro Women: Their Triumphs and Activities
