= Another Round (podcast) =

Comedy and pop culture podcast

- Genre: Comedy, Interview, Pop culture
- Language: English

Cast and voices
- Hosted by: Tracy Clayton and Heben Nigatu

Production
- Length: Varies

Publication
- No. of episodes: 113, plus bonus episodes and "Shots" (mini episodes)
- Original release: March 24, 2015 – December 20, 2017
- Provider: Panoply Media

Related
- Website: www.buzzfeed.com/anotherround

Another Round is a culture podcast co-hosted by Tracy Clayton and Heben Nigatu. Debuting on BuzzFeed on March 24, 2015, Another Round featured interviews with guests such as writer and MacArthur Genius Ta-Nehisi Coates and U.S. presidential candidate Hillary Clinton, as well as segments on topics ranging from race, gender to pop culture. BuzzFeed ceased production of the podcast in 2017.

== About ==
The premise of the podcast was that the two hosts, Clayton and Nigatu, talk to each other and guests while both having fun and tackling serious topics, like mental health, feminism and racism. In their debut episode, they described the podcast: "Another Round is basically happy hour with friends you haven't met yet. Grab a drink and yell along." The hosts always had drinks throughout the taping and it was a central theme of the show, helping give it a casual vibe. At the same time, the show had multiple prepared segments, topics, and interviews with many notable guests. It mixed corny jokes with journalism, heavily researching guests and often asking difficult questions. The hosts described their approach and reason for creating the podcast, "We believe in the power of listening, of bearing witness and sharing each other's stories."

== Guests ==
In addition to Coates and Clinton, Another Round episodes featured many episodes with interviews of notable guests including New York Times best-selling author Roxane Gay, Hamilton writer and star Lin-Manuel Miranda, comedian Margaret Cho, writer and First Lady of New York City Chirlane McCray, and NPR's Audie Cornish. Many others have become well known in the time after the interviews, such as writer and comedian Issa Rae and musical artist Lizzo.

== Segments ==
In addition to interviews and Stacy's Career Corner, segments on Another Round included Drunken Debates, Tracy's Animal Corner, Is This Real Life?, What Had Happened Was, Rapid Fire ("Pew Pew Pew!"), Nichole's Nookie Nook, Tracy's Joke Time, and White Devil's Advocate. At the end of every episode, there is also the repeating segment where the hosts would "buy a round" for something or someone that they appreciate.

== Production team ==
Buzzfeed's Tracy Clayton and Heben Nigatu hosted Another Round. Occasional guest hosts sat in for Nigatu after she joined The Late Show with Stephen Colbert staff in July 2016. Stacy-Marie Ishmael, Buzzfeed's Managing Editor for Mobile News, hosted Stacy's Career Corner as a recurring guest.

Another Round was one of five podcasts produced by BuzzFeed's audio team. Producers included Jenna Weiss-Berman, Eleanor Kagan, Julia Furlan and Meg Cramer, collectively referred to as the Pod Squad.

== Accolades ==
Another Round episodes were rated "Best of 2015" by iTunes, Slate, Vulture, and The Atlantic. In 2016, Forbes named Nigatu to its annual 30 Under 30 list, citing her work on "the popular and influential BuzzFeed podcast Another Round...which has monthly listener numbers in the hundreds of thousands." Writing for The Guardian, critic Sasha Frere-Jones described hosts Nigatu and Clayton as "leading American cultural critics."

== Hiatus ==
In late 2017, BuzzFeed announced the decision to stop producing Another Round, but that Nigatu and Clayton could take ownership and production of the show after a hiatus. BuzzFeed canceled not only Another Round, but by late 2018 cancelled its two other shows Thirst Aid Kit and See Something Say Something and laid off the entire podcast production team. The other two shows both eventually resumed production under different models, unrelated to BuzzFeed. Another Round has not returned and the hiatus is indefinite.

Both hosts of Another Round went on to take other jobs, Clayton going on to host multiple podcasts and Nigatu as a staff writer for Desus & Mero. Clayton explained in an interview to Vice that they could have continued after being given the ownership of the podcasts, but both were too tired. Clayton said, "It wasn't easy to be in the position to take away this thing that you all love and that we gave birth to for a little while. But we were tired and we needed to rest and lay down because invisible illnesses like anxiety and depression are things that even HR departments don't always acknowledge." There has been significant and continued interest in its revival, with many fans being vocal about missing the show.

Controversy about the ending of the show was reignited in June 2020, when Clayton and Nigatu shared that while they have ownership over the name they did not own any of the back catalogue. This is in contrast with the other two BuzzFeed shows, Thirst Aid Kit and See Something Say Something, which both own their back catalogue. Many people involved in the creation of Another Round have also come forward in the aftermath to say that even during production and the height of its popularity, the podcast was not given much support or resources internally. BuzzFeed has since acknowledged its lack of support, with the CEO Jonah Peretti, saying that the business was "bad at selling podcasts to clients, and [...] bad at selling content focused on Black audiences. This is inexcusable and cost us dearly. We should have developed those skills."

== Episodes ==
Episode #	Date aired	Title	Content
23	September 1, 2015	The Audacity of Despair (with David Simon)	Talk with David Simon, creator of The Wire and Show Me a Hero.
22	August 25, 2015	A Dude Named Hot Sauce (with Yassir Lester)	Interview with Yassir Lester, comedian and writer for 'Girls.'
21	August 18, 2015	The Reverse Jackie Robinson (with Chris Hayes)	Interview with MSNBC's Chris Hayes (the first white guest). First episode with Stacy's Career Corner segment.
20	August 11, 2015	Peak Blackness (with Rembert Browne)	Drunken debates with Grantland's Rembert Browne.
19	August 4, 2015	Was That a Microaggression or Just Tuesday? (with Audie Cornish)	Interview with Audie Cornish, host of NPR's All Things Considered.
18	July 28, 2015	Unstoppable (with Lianne La Havas)	Interview with Lianne La Havas and the hosts interview white men on the street.
17	July 7, 2015	Caribbean Vibez (with Stacy-Marie Ishmael)	Interview with Stacy-Marie Ishmael, who was then BuzzFeed's News App Editor, and listeners call in their microagressions.
16	June 30, 2015	Another Read (with Crissle West)	Interview with Crissle West of The Read and the debut of Tracy's animal corner.
15	June 23, 2015	Crush that Rage Into A Diamond	Interview with Jay Smooth
14	June 16, 2015	Multitudity (with Tiq Milan)	Interview with Tiq Milan.
13	June 9, 2015	Another Round LIVE! (with Roxane Gay)	Interview with Roxane Gay.
12	June 2, 2015	Casual Negro Spirituals (with Jean Grae)	Interview with Jean Grae.
11	May 26, 2015	Bob Loblaw (with Chirlane McCray)	Interview with NYC's First Lady Chirlane McCray
10	May 19, 2015	You Tickled Whitney Houston?! (with Brandy)	Interview with Brandy Norwood
9	May 12, 2015	You're Gonna Be a Boss One Day (with Kaya Thomas)	Interview with Kaya Thomas.
8	May 5, 2015	Shmoney For The Ancestors (with Rachel Kaadzi Ghansah)	Interview with Rachel Kaadzi Ghansah.
7	April 28, 2015	Living in America	Self-care and police violence
6	April 21, 2015	Lit Like Bic (with Desus Nice)	Interview with Desus Nice
5	April 10, 2015	Young East African Girl (with Hannah Giorgis)	East African feminism
4	April 7, 2015	A Podcast of One's Own (with Gene Demby)	Interview with Gene Demby, lead blogger at NPR's Code Switch team
3	March 31, 2015	Oh, the Racism! (with Issa Rae)	Interview with Issa Rae
2	March 26, 2015	You Know White People (with Jazmine Hughes)	Origin stories
1	March 25, 2015	Unlearning (with Durga Chew-Bose)	Interview with writer Durga Chew-Bose
