= Jamil Smith =

Jamil Smith may refer to:

- Jamil Smith (journalist), American television reporter and writer
- Jamil Walker Smith, American actor
