= Black Girl Magic =

Entertainment and apparel brand

- Type: Moniker, message, brand, TV show, podcast, books
- Location: International

Black Girl Magic is an entertainment, broadcast, and apparel brand, with a TV show and podcast of the same name, created in 2014 by Beverly Bond. Bond is an author, celebrity DJ, model and founder of the women's empowerment organization and award show Black Girls Rock!, established in 2006. In 2014, Bond founded and trademarked Black Girl Magic for an apparel line and talk show she developed under BondVision Media, Inc., Bond's production company. Since 2015, Bond featured Black Girl Magic talks at the annual BLACK GIRLS LEAD Summit for teen girls in New York City. In 2018, Bond launched the Black Girl MagicPodcast to elevate the lived experiences of Black women. In 2019 Bond featured Black Girl Magic panels and talks at the inaugural BGR!FEST held at the Kennedy Center in Washington, DC.

== History ==
=== Origin ===
In 2014, Bond registered Black Girl Magic as an extension of the BLACK GIRLS ROCK! brand, an apparel line sold in the BLACK GIRLS ROCK! store, and a TV Show Bond developed under her production company BondVision Media. Bond secured social media handles on Facebook and Twitter for Black Girl Magic by August 2014. In 2016 Bond executive produced the pilot for the Black Girl Magic TV Show directed by Matthew Cherry, hosted Tatyana Ali and Janell Snowden, and with guest appearances by Jay Ellis, Nzingha Stewart, Lalah Hathaway and MC Lyte. In 2018, Bond created the Black Girl Magic Hour Podcast to continue elevating conversations by and for Black women. Black Girl Magic Hour includes a weekly panel of Black women thought leaders across sectors including Michaela Angela Davis, Kierna Mayo, Raqiyah Mays, Janell Snowden, Beverly Bond and other special guests.

Bond credits friend, feminist author, scholar, and former Black Girls Rock! Board Member, Joan Morgan, with using the phrase "Black Girl Magic" and subconsciously planting the term in her head as early as 2000. In 1999 Morgan published, "When Chickenheads Come Home to Roost" where she writes, “I wrote. Spent lots of time near the water. Heard Oshun's laughter twinkling like bells, urging me to recapture the feminine and discover the fierceness of a black girl’s magic.”

== Controversy ==
=== Timeline ===
In 1999 Joan Morgan published, "When Chickenheads Come Home to Roost" where she writes, “I wrote. Spent lots of time near the water. Heard Oshun's laughter twinkling like bells, urging me to recapture the feminine and discover the fierceness of a black girl’s magic.”

Beverly Bond, founder of BLACK GIRLS ROCK! and creator/executive producer of the BLACK GIRLS ROCK! Awards, has the first documented trademark registration for "Black Girl Magic" in 2014 and social media handles for Black Girl Magic on Twitter and Facebook (2014). Bond filed the trademark for Broadcast, Entertainment, and Merchandise after pitching a show of the same name as part of her development deal with BET Networks.

CaShawn Thompson, a DC-based educator, claims that she is "the mother of #BlackGirlMagic" after she created the Black Girls are Magic hashtag in 2013 and Black Girls are Magic T-shirts for "an intimate circle of friends" in 2014. However, there isn't any legal documentation of use, Uniform Resource Locator (URL), public facing marketing campaign, or registered business to substantiate Thompson's claims to coining the term "Black Girl Magic" before Bond registered for the trademark in 2014. Thompson also references a speech made by Michelle Obama at the 2015 BLACK GIRL ROCK! Awards, created by Beverly Bond, as her inspiration to start conversations about Black women's achievements using the hashtag "Black Girl are Magic".

=== Legal ===
In 2016 Essence created a digital series titled "Black Girl Magic". In 2017 Essence Magazine attempted to trademark "Essence Black Girl Magic," although the registration for "Black Girl Magic" was already registered by Beverly Bond." Bond won the legal dispute.

In March 2019, Google released an advertisement "Black Girl Magic: A moment in search", but neglected to mention or contact Bond to use her trademarked phrase, which upset individuals who believe that Black women's contributions to popular culture are being erased or minimized.

== See also ==
- Beverly Bond
- Black Girls Rock!
- Carefree Black Girls
- Joan Morgan (American author)
- Magical Negro
