= Carefree Black Girls =

Cultural concept

Carefree Black Girls is a cultural concept and movement that aims to increase the breadth of "alternative" representations of black women. The origins of this expression can be traced to both Twitter and Tumblr. Zeba Blay was reportedly the first person to use the expression as a hashtag on Twitter in May 2013. Danielle Hawkins soon launched a blog on Tumblr by the same name. In her article for The Root, Diamond Sharp describes "carefree black girls" as an idea that, "[black women] have used to anchor expressions of individuality and whimsy in the face of the heavy stereotypes and painful realities that too often color discussions of their demographic." At Refinery29, Jamala Johns said it was "a way to celebrate all things joyous and eclectic among brown ladies. Cultivated online and driven by social media, it's one telling piece of a much wider development of inspiration assembled by and for black women." Hillary Crosley Coker, a reporter for Jezebel provides specific examples of notable black women embodying the concept. She claims that, "ladies like Chiara de Blasio (with her hippie flower headband), Solange [Knowles] and her eclectic style and Janelle Monae's futurism are their patron saints".

== Reception ==
The "carefree black girl" movement has prompted the development of related concepts and efforts such as "carefree black boys," a term also dubbed by Blay. Another concept that emerged was "carefree black kids" via the hashtag from Another Round host and Late Night with Stephen Colbert writer Heben Nigatu (#carefreeblackkids2k16). In July 2016, Blavity called the photos and videos posted with Nigatu's hashtag "the bright light we needed after this troubling week," which was marked by the state-sponsored killings of Alton Sterling and Philandro Castile.

=== Criticism ===
As the "carefree black girl" concept gained favorable recognition, it has also faced criticism. Shamira Ibrahim, reporter for The Root compares the emergence of the "carefree black girl" concept to "black girl magic," critiquing the term's usage as "a catch-all term that seems to run counter to the reality of being a black woman not just in America but in much of the world."

== See also ==
- Black Twitter
- Black Girl Magic
- Counterculture
