= Zeba Blay =

Ghanaian-American writer and culture critic

- Born: 1988 or 1989 (age 37–38); Ghana
- Education: The New School
- Occupations: Writer, cultural critic, film critic
- Years active: 2013 – present
- Known for: #CarefreeBlackGirl
- Website: zeba-blay.com

Zeba Blay is a Ghanaian-American writer, film and cultural critic, and former senior culture writer for The Huffington Post. She coined the hashtag #CarefreeBlackGirl in 2013 and published her accompanying debut essay collection Carefree Black Girls: A Celebration of Black Women in Pop Culture in 2021.

== Early life and education ==
Blay was born in Ghana and raised in Jersey City, New Jersey. She took a film class in high school that helped her develop an interest in film criticism.

In 2013, she received her bachelor's degree from The New School's Eugene Lang College, where she created an original concentration in cultural criticism.

She has named Toni Morrison, Janet Mock, Manohla Dargis, and Greg Tate as writers who influenced her work.

== Career ==
=== Writing ===
Blay's writing has been in published in The New York Times, The Village Voice, IndieWire, Film Comment, and others. She was a culture writer at HuffPost from 2013 until 2021. Her work has been cited in outlets including NPR, Vogue, and Vox. She was a writer for the web series MTV Decoded, hosted by Franchesca Ramsey.

She coined the viral hashtag #CarefreeBlackGirl on Twitter in October 2013. In October 2021, she released her debut book based on the concept, Carefree Black Girls: A Celebration of Black Women in Pop Culture, an essay collection on the contributions of Black women to American culture. The book explores topics including colorism, the policing of Black women's bodies, Cardi B, and her insights as a working journalist. She also includes her personal experiences with anxiety and depression.

=== Other work ===
Blay co-hosted the pop culture podcast Two Brown Girls with Fariha Róisín from 2012 to 2017.

She uses her personal Instagram as an archive for images related to Black expression, emotion, and care.

== Personal life ==
Blay resides in New York City.

== Works ==
- Blay, Zeba (2021). Carefree Black Girls: A Celebration of Black Women in Popular Culture. St. Martin's Publishing Group. ISBN 9781250231574.
