= Kaya Thomas =

American computer scientist

- Born: 1995 (age 30–31); Staten Island, New York, U.S.
- Occupation: App developer
- Known for: We Read Too
- Website: kayathomas.is

Kaya Thomas-Wilson (born 1995) is an American app developer. She is the creator of We Read Too, an iOS app that helps readers discover books for and by people of color. Thomas is a volunteer mentor with Black Girls Code and a Made with Code role model. She has received recognition for her work to improve diversity in the tech industry and was honored in 2015 by Michelle Obama at BET's Black Girls Rock! award show and was named one of Glamour's 2016 College Women of the Year.

== Early life and education ==
Thomas is originally from Staten Island, New York. In high school, Thomas was an avid reader and realized that there were not enough black girls in the young adult novels she was reading. She wished that there was a resource that would show books written by and for black girls and women. This experience would eventually be the inspiration for her app, We Read Too.

Thomas graduated in 2017 from Dartmouth College, where she studied computer science. Initially enrolled in environmental engineering, she switched to computer science after teaching herself to code through Codecademy. She credits a TED Talk by Kimberly Bryant, founder of Black Girls Code, with sparking her interest in the tech industry. Thomas is particularly interested in the role technology can play in improving people's day-to-day lives.

== Career ==
One of Thomas' first professional experiences was with Time Inc. as an intern with the Entertainment Weekly brand working on their mobile site.

After she graduated from Dartmouth in 2017, Thomas worked full-time as an iOS engineer for Slack. Currently, she is working for Calm, a wellness company based in San Francisco, California.

In 2015 Thomas was named a CODE2040 Fellow. The following year she was appointed a role model as part of Google's Made with Code initiative, which provides girls with coding support and training to encourage their entry into technology-based fields. She was also named one of Glamour's 2016 College Women of the Year.

== Software ==
=== We Read Too ===
Thomas began working on the iOS app We Read Too in 2014 while working as an intern at Time Inc. The app highlights books written by people of color featuring characters of color. Aimed at improving access to books for and by diverse communities, We Read Too helps young readers find books with protagonists they can relate to. The app is free to remove barriers to entry. This was made possible by crowdsourcing efforts.

The idea for the app was based on Thomas' experience as a young reader who struggled to find diverse books. She explained to BET in 2014 that: "Whenever I tried to find books with characters of color, I would have to look in sub-categories or search longer than I should have had to. I created this app so that books created by and for people of color can be found easily and in one central location." She was honored for her work on the app by Michelle Obama in 2015 as part of BET's Black Girls Rock! award show.

As of April 2017 the app had been downloaded 15,000 times, and as of March 2020 its directory contains almost 1,000 titles. To achieve these numbers, Thomas launched an Indiegogo campaign in March 2017 to achieve the goal of 1,000 listed titles featuring Black, Latinx, Native, Indigenous, Asian, and Pacific Islander characters. Part of the identified work was launching an Android version of the app and undertaking a redesign of the iOS version. By mid-April she had surpassed the initial goal of $10,000, indicating that additional funds would be put toward developing a website for the app and introducing fiction titles aimed at adults.

== Other work ==
In 2015 she spoke at BookNet Canada's 10th annual Tech Forum where she advocated for the importance of children, from all backgrounds, being exposed to diverse book characters. She encouraged the traditionally white publishing industry to include ethnicity based metadata about authors to improve discoverability of diverse writers and publications.

In addition to writing for various news sites, including TechCrunch and Model View Culture, Thomas has appeared on podcasts Another Round and Code Newbie to discuss her work.

Thomas is a volunteer mentor with Black Girls Code and the founder of the YouTube series Code With Kaya. She has expressed her commitment to helping women learn to code and promoting the diversification of both the tech and publishing industry.

She has four patents filed relating to the automatic correction of software on devices via push notifications.

== Accolades ==
- 2015 - Black Girls Rock! Honoree, BET
- 2016 - College Women of the Year, Glamour
