= Shereen Marisol Meraji =

Journalist, podcaster, and educator

- Born: 1977 (age 48–49)
- Education: San Francisco State University
- Employer: UC Berkeley
- Known for: Code Switch

Shereen Marisol Meraji (born 1977) is an American journalist, podcaster and educator. She is an assistant professor of race in journalism at the UC Berkeley Graduate School of Journalism, and is an alumnus of the Nieman Fellowship at Harvard University. She was the founding co-host and senior producer of Code Switch, a critically acclaimed podcast covering race, culture and identity, which was one of NPR's highest charting podcasts in 2020.

== Early life ==
Meraji was born and raised in Northern California, the child of a Puerto Rican mother and Iranian father. As a child, Meraji was bullied by classmates about her Iranian heritage. Meraji's multi-ethnic background has informed her approach to stories and journalism; she noted in an interview with Latina magazine that "never having really belonged, being on the margins while observing everything, that's made me a natural journalist – not quite a part of something, always observing."

Meraji received a Bachelor of Arts in Raza studies at San Francisco State University.

== Career ==
Meraji began her career as a radio reporter and producer, working and freelancing for various shows and organizations. She joined NPR in 2003, where she worked as a producer and director of the midday show Day to Day and a producer for NPR's flagship news magazine All Things Considered. She joined Southern California Public Radio in 2011 as a business and economy reporter, and reported for Marketplace's Wealth & Poverty desk in 2012. In 2013, Meraji returned to NPR as a race and culture reporter on the team that would create the Code Switch blog.

In 2014, Meraji was sent to report from Ferguson, Missouri, during protests following the police killing of Michael Brown. Meraji described an incident when her interview with a protester was cut from a radio program, leading to criticism from some listeners that she had failed to report on perspectives from all sides, which led her to want to start a podcast in order to have more time for nuanced and multi-sided conversations.

=== Code Switch ===
Starting in 2016, Meraji was one of the founding co-hosts of NPR's Code Switch podcast, alongside co-host Gene Demby. Meraji has stated that she hoped the podcast would make issues of race, cultur and identity "more accessible to a broader audience." Meraji's work was part of an emerging development in news content and analysis that involved engaging younger, more diverse audiences, often by picking up on themes first advanced from social media platforms, blogs, and pop culture. According to an interview with Meraji by WWD in July 2016, the podcast had over 1 million downloads within its first two months on air, with Meraji aiming to create an inclusive space for discussing topical issues such as the killing of Philando Castile, the Black Lives Matter movement, and the viewpoint of supporters of Donald Trump during the 2016 presidential election.

In the wake of the murder of George Floyd in 2020, Code Switch audience numbers increased significantly, and the show was briefly the top-downloaded podcast in the country.

=== Academia ===
In September 2021, Meraji left Code Switch and NPR to accept a Nieman Fellowship at Harvard University, where she worked on a project that focused on "creating media that is relevant and accessible to communities of color, working with young people, and adding depth and nuance to reporting around Latine communities."

After her fellowship, she joined the faculty at the UC Berkeley Graduate School of Journalism as an assistant professor in July 2022. In her role, she hoped to "create new publishing opportunities in podcasting for students, working with them to produce episodes on race and identity, as well as investigate other topics." She is the school's first female tenure track faculty member specializing in audio journalism.

== Awards and recognition ==
In 2007, Meraji received an International Reporting Project Fellowship and traveled to Beirut, Lebanon, where she reported on youth culture.

Meraji gained attention for her 2014 feature for Third Coast International Audio Festival titled "Audio Code Switching: Tackling Race on the Radio”, focusing on the homogeneity of voices represented in public radio, sometimes known as "public radio voice", and the need for more diverse representation. She also served as a judge for the festival in 2015 and 2019.

Meraji received awards from the National Association of Hispanic Journalists in 2015 and 2016, the latter for a piece about an scout leader for a troupe of at-risk boys.

In December 2020, Apple Podcasts announced that Code Switch had been selected as Show of the Year, marking the first time that Apple Podcasts recognized a single podcast of the year.

In 2021, Code Switch won an Ambie award from the Podcast Academy for Best Society and Culture Podcast.

== Personal life ==
Meraji is married to Nicholas Espíritu, a civil rights attorney.
