= Gene Demby =

American journalist

- Education: Hofstra University
- Occupations: Journalist, Podcast Host
- Employer: NPR
- Known for: Code Switch; PostBourgie

Gene Demby is an American journalist and podcast host. He is cohost of the podcast Code Switch, created by National Public Radio (NPR). He's also the lead blogger covering race, ethnicity, and culture on the blog of the same name.

Demby previously founded the blog and podcast PostBourgie. He started his media career at The New York Times and Huffington Post.

== Early life ==
Demby grew up in South Philadelphia, and attended Hofstra University.

== Career ==
Prior to joining NPR, Demby worked for The New York Times and then as managing editor for Huffington Post's BlackVoices vertical.

=== PostBourgie blog ===
Demby began blogging in 2004. Speaking to ColorLines in 2012, Demby said he'd been motivated by frustration with media conversations about race, mentioning in particular an occasion a CNN reporter approached him on a basketball court to ask for comment on Bill Cosby's Pound Cake speech at the 2004 NAACP Image Awards. In 2007 Demby founded a collective blog on race, culture, politics and media called PostBourgie, inviting friends to collaborate who shared his desire "to have conversations that assumed that black people were human beings who were complicated and imperfect, a space that wasn't super didactic."

Speaking to New York Magazine, Jamil Smith cited PostBourgie as one of the blogs that "really set the bar for [...] spaces that were made available to [black readerships and other readerships of color]. [...] It really hearkens back to the tradition of the black press." In The Washington Post, Alyssa Rosenberg praised PostBourgie's accomplishments in "building a ladder for all its participants. The blog gave the people who wrote there a chance to workshop their voices and refine their ideas for a smart audience, even when they didn’t have paying assignments for an idea." PostBourgie alumni include Shani Hilton and Tracy Clayton.

Demby hosted an accompanying podcast also called PostBourgie.

=== NPR Code Switch ===
Demby debuted the NPR project Code Switch on April 7, 2013, with an introductory essay that met with immediate acclaim; writing for Complex, Jason Parham said if "'How Code-Switching Explains The World' is any indication of the content to come, we couldn't be more excited."

In 2016, Demby and cohost Shereen Marisol Meraji debuted what the Nieman Foundation for Journalism called "the long-awaited podcast" from Code Switch.

== Awards ==
In 2009, PostBourgie won a Black Weblog Award for Best Political/News Blog.

In 2013 and again in 2014, Demby was named to The Root 100's list of the 100 most important black influencers.

In 2014, Demby and the Code Switch team won the Online News Association's Journalism Award for Online Commentary.

== Personal life ==
Demby is married to fellow journalist Kainaz Amaria. The couple live in Washington and have one child.
