= Heben Nigatu =

Writer and podcast host

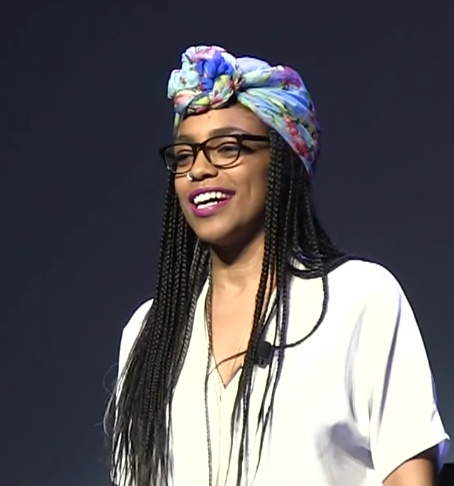
- Nigatu at XOXO in 2016
- Born: Jigjiga, Ethiopia
- Education: Columbia University
- Occupations: Writer; podcaster; comedian
- Known for: Another Round; Late Show with Stephen Colbert
- Awards: Forbes 30 Under 30; The Root 100

Heben Nigatu is an Ethiopian-American writer and the former co-host of BuzzFeed podcast Another Round which stopped broadcasting in 2017. She previously wrote for The Late Show with Stephen Colbert and is currently a staff writer for Desus & Mero on Showtime.

== Early life and education ==
Nigatu was born in Ethiopia.

She grew up in Northern Virginia and attended Columbia University before leaving to join BuzzFeed.

== Career ==
Nigatu began working at BuzzFeed on a three-month fellowship while still a student, then joined the full-time staff.

=== Another Round ===
In March 2015, Nigatu and co-host Tracy Clayton launched BuzzFeed podcast Another Round. The A.V. Club described Nigatu and Clayton as "funny and insightful hosts, bringing their infectious personalities to conversations that range from squirrels to self-care to microaggressions in the workplace." The Guardian called them "the smartest, funniest women in the room and everyone wants to sit at their table;" likewise writing for The Guardian, critic Sasha Frere-Jones described Clayton and Nigatu as "leading American cultural critics." In its first year, Another Round was named by iTunes, Slate, Vulture, and The Atlantic as one of the best podcasts of 2015.

In late 2017, Nigatu and Clayton announced that BuzzFeed had decided to stop producing Another Round, but the two hosts were granted ownership of the show and planned to continue it outside of BuzzFeed, after an indefinite hiatus.

=== Post-BuzzFeed ===
In April 2016, Nigatu announced she was moving to The Late Show with Stephen Colbert, but would continue hosting Another Round. She continued at The Late Show until January 2017.

On 15 February 2019, it was announced that Nigatu was a staff writer for Desus & Mero, the late-night talk show on Showtime.

=== #CarefreeBlackKids2k16 ===
In the wake of the 2016 police shootings of Alton Sterling and Philando Castile, Nigatu created the hashtag #CarefreeBlackKids2k16. Blavity described the photos and videos accompanying the hashtag as "the bright light we needed after this troubling week."

== Honors ==
- Forbes 30 Under 30 (2016)
- Fast Company 100 Most Creative People (2016)
- The Root 100 (2016)

== Personal life ==
Nigatu lives in Brooklyn.

== See also ==
- Carefree Black Girls
