= Ahmed Ali Akbar (journalist) =

American writer and podcast host

Ahmed Ali Akbar is an American writer and podcast host. He hosts See Something Say Something, a podcast about Muslim American life. In 2022, he won a James Beard Foundation Award for Feature Reporting for a story on mango importing. In 2026, he won a James Beard Foundation Foodways Award for an article on bean pies.

== Education ==
Akbar is from Saginaw, Michigan. Both his parents were doctors who had immigrated from Pakistan. He attended Haverford College and then the University of Michigan as an undergraduate, graduating in 2011. He earned a master's from the Harvard Divinity School.

== Career ==
While in grad school, Akbar started a blog called Rad Brown Dads, telling the stories of immigrant fathers. He became a staff writer at BuzzFeed in 2014.

Akbar is the host of the podcast See Something Say Something about Muslim American life. Initially based at BuzzFeed, The New York Times called See Something Say Something one of the best new podcasts of the year when it debuted in 2016. IndieWire called the show's episode "Parents" "an ideal example of the casual confidence of See Something, Say Something" and "a sincere supplement to an oft-overlooked part of our national conversation", listing it as one of the 50 best podcast episodes of the year. The podcast became independent, with a supporting Patreon, in 2018, when BuzzFeed closed its audio division.

In 2022, Akbar won a James Beard Foundation Journalism Award for Feature Reporting for his story "Inside the Secretive, Semi-Illicit, High Stakes World of WhatsApp Mango Importing". The story followed on a two-part podcast episode he had made on the subject for America's Test Kitchen.

In November 2022, he began hosting Radiolingo, a podcast from Crooked Media and Duolingo.

In 2026, Akbar won a James Beard Foundation Foodways Award for his Chicago Tribune article on bean pies.

== Personal life ==
Akbar moved to New York in 2014.
