= Kat Chow =

American author and journalist

- Born: Katherine Wei-Sen Chow; United States
- Education: University of Washington
- Occupations: Journalist, author
- Years active: 2010s–present
- Employer: NPR (former)
- Known for: Cultural reporting; memoir Seeing Ghosts
- Notable work: Seeing Ghosts

Kat Chow is an Asian-American author and journalist who was a founding member of the National Public Radio show and podcast Code Switch. She has also been a regular panelist on the NPR podcast Pop Culture Happy Hour. In 2021, her book Seeing Ghosts: A Memoir was released, which discusses her family's immigration to the United States via Hong Kong and Cuba, life at age 13, and losing her mother to cancer in 2004.

Chow earned her B.A. in journalism from the University of Washington, with a minor in diversity from the Department of American Ethnic Studies in 2012. In 2019, she was presented with the University of Washington Honors Alumna award. She was the recipient of the Asian American Journalists Association 2015 National Journalism Award for reporting Asian American Pacific Islander Issues on Radio/Audio in her piece on "How The 'Kung Fu Fighting' Melody Came To Represent Asia."
