= List of African American poets =

This is a list of notable African American poets. For other African Americans, see Lists of African Americans.

- Ron Allen, poet, playwright
- Elizabeth Alexander, poet, essayist, playwright
- Maya Angelou, novelist, poet, and activist
- Amiri Baraka, poet, writer, activist, and essayist
- Gwendolyn B. Bennett, poet, writer, journalist, and artist
- Arna Bontemps, poet, novelist, and librarian
- Gwendolyn Brooks, poet, author, teacher
- Lucille Clifton, poet, writer, and educator
- Jayne Cortez, poet, activist, publisher
- Countee Cullen, poet, novelist, and playwright
- Frank Marshall Davis, poet, journalist
- Paul Laurence Dunbar, poet, novelist
- Krista Franklin, poet, visual artist
- Nikki Giovanni, poet, writer, commentator, activist, and educator
- Frances E. W. Harper, poet
- Yona Harvey, poet, professor
- Robert Hayden, poet, essayist, and educator
- Gil Scott-Heron, poet, author
- Langston Hughes, poet, activist, novelist, playwright, and columnist
- Erica Hunt, poet, essayist, and teacher
- Marilyn Nelson, poet, translator, professor
- Pat Parker, poet, activist
- Ishmael Reed, poet, novelist, essayist, songwriter, playwright, editor, and publisher
- Sonia Sanchez, poet, playwright, essayist, educator, and activist
- Patricia Smith, poet, playwright, author, teacher, and journalist
- Tracy K. Smith, poet, educator
- Tupac Shakur, rapper, poet, actor, and activist
- Natasha Trethewey, poet, professor
- Alice Walker, novelist, writer, poet, and activist
- Phillis Wheatley, poet
- Richard Wright, novelist, poet, and essayist
- Al Young, poet, novelist, essayist, screenwriter, and professor
- Kevin Young, poet, professor, editor, and literary critic
- Danez Smith, poet, writer, and performer
- Ntozake Shange, feminist playwright and poet

== See also ==
- List of African-American writers
- List of African-American nonfiction writers
