= Tasneem Raja =

Non-profit newsroom based in Oakland, California

Tasneem Raja is the current editor-in-chief for The Oaklandside, a non-profit newsroom based in Oakland, California that is funded by Google News Initiative and the American Journalism project.

She has worked for Mother Jones, The Chicago Reader, NPR Code Switch, and co-founded The Tyler Loop.

== Biography ==
The daughter of immigrants from India and Pakistan, Raja was born and raised in Greater Philadelphia. Raja attended the University of California, Berkeley School of Journalism. She was interactive editor at Mother Jones and a features reporter at The Chicago Reader before joining NPR at the Code Switch team in January 2015, becoming senior digital editor.

At NPR, Raja led the team developing the Code Switch podcast; launched in May 2016, the podcast quickly drew praise with Los Angeles Magazine saying, "NPR’s 'Code Switch' began as a popular blog, but its evolution into a podcast seems natural...it explores issues of race, culture, and politics in a personal way that flourishes in an audio format." In 2017, Raja and her husband founded The Tyler Loop, a digital news site covering Tyler, Texas.

Raja is noted for her accomplishments with technology in journalism. While news apps editor at The Bay Citizen, Raja's "team built a Bike Accident Tracker and a government salary database, among other things." She's prominently written about diversity in computer science as well as "brogrammer" culture in Silicon Valley.
