= Beverly Bond =

American author and businesswoman

- Born: December 19, 1970 (age 55); New York City
- Occupations: Businesswoman, DJ, model
- Known for: Founder of Black Girls Rock!
- Spouse: Bazaar Royale (m. 2004)

Beverly Bond (born December 19, 1970) is an American author, DJ, businesswoman, philanthropist, producer, writer and former Wilhemenia model. She founded the organization Black Girls Rock! which recognizes the success of Black women.

== Early life ==
Bond was born on December 19, 1970, in New York City. She was raised by her mother, Mary Burroughs. As a child, Bond lived in several homes throughout the state of Maryland. Bond attended a different school every year of her childhood from kindergarten to tenth grade, and sometimes two schools in one year. Her mother collected music and told her about many genres of music, including hip-hop, and world beat, blues, jazz, soul, funk, and old school. Bond started to collect her own hip-hop records, and became a serious record collector.

== Career ==
=== Modelling ===
At the age of seventeen, Bond moved to New York to pursue a modeling career. Her first agency was Elite New Faces, where because of her 5'9 frame she was booked for jobs that were mainly for athletic brands. Bonds signed with Wilhelmina Models and was booked for campaigns and commercials for Diesel Jeans, Guess, Nike, and Nordstrom.

=== DJing ===
In November 1999, Bond bought a set of turntables, with aspirations of using her extensive record collection to become a DJ. She started deejaying at local clubs in New York. As she secured more DJ work, she gradually stopped attending modelling auditions. Bond spun and mixed for gatherings of celebrities including Prince, Jay-Z, Sean "Puffy" Combs, Sarah Jessica Parker, Kimora Lee Simmons, Alicia Keys, Hugo Boss, Andre Harrell and Veronica Webb, and Playboy. She spun for singer D'Angelo's Voodoo album release party. She toured with Sunshine Anderson and Musiq Soulchild for the Courvoisier tour where she was the official DJ for Erykah Badu, The Roots, and Amerie.

Bond has also spun at The Glamour Fashion Awards, the VH1 Fashion Awards, ESPN's X-Games Awards, The CFDA Awards, the Chanel parties (during New York Fashion Week), and the NY Planet Hollywood opening. She has appeared on BET's Rap City: Tha Basement and has also appeared as a celebrity DJ at Eileen Fords "Super Model of the World" contest in Puerto Rico. In 2012, Bond was honored at the ASCAP 4th Annual Women Behind the Music gathering in New York. In 2013 Bond spun at New York nightclubs, and contributed regularly to Russell Simmons' OneWorld magazine and Essence.

On July 9, 2020, Bond joined Senator Kamala Harris and other artists for the "Get Up, Stand Up!" virtual fundraiser in support of Joe Biden's 2020 presidential campaign.

== Organization / Black Girls Rock Awards Show ==
Bond is the founder of the organization Black Girls Rock! This started out with a T-shirt imprint in 2006 and grew into a mentorship program for young women promoting self-worth and empowerment.

In 2006 Bond also created the Black Girls Rock! Awards. The first ceremony was held in Brooklyn, NY. In 2007 Bond took the well received award show to the prestigious Lincoln Center in Manhattan New York. BET Network executive Stephen Hill was on the host committee and attended the 2nd Annual BLACK GIRLS ROCK! Awards in 2007 and was instrumental in bringing the award show to BET/Viacom in 2009. In 2010 Bond partnered with BET to produce and broadcast the first televised version of the award show. Bond was the creator and executive producer of the show, which honors the accomplishments of women of color in categories that included acting, politics, music, and more. The show also has entertainment throughout the night. The premier garnered 2.7 million viewers, and the awards won an NAACP Image Award for outstanding Variety Series or Special in 2013 and 2014. The show has now reached 10 million viewers annually, and in 2015 she initiated an associated organization, Black Girls Rock! Africa.

At the 2016 awards show, Bond was thanked by Hillary Clinton for her promotion of black women. In May 2016, Bond was presented with a Women Who Care award in New York.
