= List of African-American speakers of U.S. state legislatures =

The following is a list of African-American speakers of U.S. state legislatures.

== Upper houses ==
Portrait	Name	Party	Title	Legislature	Term start	Term end	Notes
	Barbara Jordan	Democratic	President pro tempore	Texas Senate	March 28, 1972	March 30, 1972	
	Cecil A. Partee	Democratic	President	Illinois Senate	January 8, 1975	February 16, 1977	
	Craig Washington	Democratic	President pro tempore	Texas Senate	December 8, 1989	December 12, 1989	
	Joe Neal	Democratic	President pro tempore	Nevada Senate	1991	1991	
	Rodney Ellis	Democratic	President pro tempore	Texas Senate	May 31, 1999	January 9, 2001	
	Rosa Franklin	Democratic	President pro tempore	Washington State Senate	January 8, 2001	January 13, 2003	
	Rosa Franklin	Democratic	President pro tempore	Washington State Senate	June 30, 2004	January 10, 2011	
	Shirley Turner	Democratic	President pro tempore	New Jersey Senate	January 8, 2002	January 12, 2010	
	Emil Jones	Democratic	President	Illinois Senate	January 8, 2003	January 3, 2009	
	Diana Bajoie	Democratic	President pro tempore	Louisiana State Senate	January 12, 2004	January 14, 2008	
	Margaret Carter	Democratic	President pro tempore	Oregon State Senate	2005	2009	
	Peter Groff	Democratic	President pro tempore	Colorado Senate	January 12, 2005	January 9, 2008	
	Peter Groff	Democratic	President	Colorado Senate	January 9, 2008	January 7, 2009	
	Royce West	Democratic	President pro tempore	Texas Senate	April 17, 2006	January 8, 2007	
	Nathaniel J. McFadden	Democratic	President pro tempore	Maryland Senate	January 10, 2007	January 9, 2019	
	Sharon Weston Broome	Democratic	President pro tempore	Louisiana State Senate	January 14, 2008	January 11, 2016	
	Malcolm Smith	Democratic	Temporary President	New York State Senate	January 7, 2009	June 8, 2009	
	Nia Gill	Democratic	President pro tempore	New Jersey Senate	January 12, 2010	January 9, 2018	
	Harold Metts	Democratic	President pro tempore	Rhode Island Senate	January 3, 2017	January 5, 2021	
	Andrea Stewart-Cousins	Democratic	Temporary President	New York State Senate	January 9, 2019	Incumbent	
	Melony G. Griffith	Democratic	President pro tempore	Maryland Senate	January 8, 2020	January 11, 2023	
	Louise Lucas	Democratic	President pro tempore	Virginia Senate	January 8, 2020	Incumbent	
	James Manning Jr.	Democratic	President pro tempore	Oregon State Senate	January 11, 2021	Incumbent	
	Sandra Bolden Cunningham	Democratic	President pro tempore	New Jersey Senate	January 11, 2022	Incumbent	
	Malcolm Augustine	Democratic	President pro tempore	Maryland Senate	January 11, 2023	Incumbent	

== Lower houses ==
Portrait	Name	Party	Title	Legislature	Term start	Term end	Notes
	John R. Lynch	Republican	Speaker	Mississippi House of Representatives	January 1872	January 1873	First African-American Speaker of any state legislature
	Samuel J. Lee	Republican	Speaker	South Carolina House of Representatives	1872	1874	
	Robert B. Elliott	Republican	Speaker	South Carolina House of Representatives	November 24, 1874	April 14, 1876	
	Isaac Shadd	Republican	Speaker	Mississippi House of Representatives	1874	1876	
	S. Howard Woodson	Democratic	Speaker	New Jersey General Assembly	1974	1976	First African-American speaker of any state legislature in the United States since the Reconstruction era
	K. Leroy Irvis	Democratic	Speaker	Pennsylvania House of Representatives	May 23, 1977	November 30, 1978	
	K. Leroy Irvis	Democratic	Speaker	Pennsylvania House of Representatives	January 4, 1983	November 30, 1988	
	Willie Brown	Democratic	Speaker	California State Assembly	December 2, 1980	June 5, 1995	
	Lois DeBerry	Democratic	Speaker pro tempore	Tennessee House of Representatives	1987	2010	
	Dan Blue	Democratic	Speaker	North Carolina House of Representatives	January 1, 1991	January 1, 1995	
	Sherman Copelin	Democratic	Speaker pro tempore	Louisiana House of Representatives	January 13, 1992	January 15, 1996	
	Donald Kofi Tucker	Democratic	Speaker pro tempore	New Jersey General Assembly	January 8, 2002	October 17, 2005	
	Adrienne A. Jones	Democratic	Speaker pro tempore	Maryland House of Delegates	January 8, 2003	May 1, 2019	
	Adrienne A. Jones	Democratic	Speaker	Maryland House of Delegates	May 1, 2019	December 4, 2025	
	John Lovick	Democratic	Speaker pro tempore	Washington House of Representatives	January 13, 2003	January 5, 2008	Served as acting speaker from 2019–2020
	John Lovick	Democratic	Speaker pro tempore	Washington House of Representatives	January 8, 2018	January 11, 2021	Served as acting speaker from 2019–2020
	Sharon Weston Broome	Democratic	Speaker pro tempore	Louisiana House of Representatives	January 12, 2004	January 12, 2005	
	Yvonne Dorsey-Colomb	Democratic	Speaker pro tempore	Louisiana House of Representatives	January 12, 2005	January 14, 2008	
	Jerry Green	Democratic	Speaker pro tempore	New Jersey General Assembly	January 8, 2008	April 18, 2018	
	Karen Carter Peterson	Democratic	Speaker pro tempore	Louisiana House of Representatives	January 14, 2008	March 8, 2010	
	Karen Bass	Democratic	Speaker	California State Assembly	May 13, 2008	March 1, 2010	First African-American woman to serve as Speaker of any state legislature
	Terrance Carroll	Democratic	Speaker	Colorado House of Representatives	January 7, 2009	January 12, 2011	
	Sheila Oliver	Democratic	Speaker	New Jersey General Assembly	January 12, 2010	January 14, 2014	
	Gordon Fox	Democratic	Speaker	Rhode Island House of Representatives	February 11, 2010	March 22, 2014	
	Darrin Williams	Democratic	Speaker pro tempore	Arkansas House of Representatives	2012	2012	
	T. W. Shannon	Republican	Speaker	Oklahoma House of Representatives	January 8, 2013	February 10, 2014	
	Jeffrion L. Aubry	Democratic	Speaker pro tempore	New York State Assembly	January 9, 2013	Incumbent	
	Carl Heastie	Democratic	Speaker	New York State Assembly	February 3, 2015	Incumbent	
	Jason Frierson	Democratic	Speaker	Nevada Assembly	February 6, 2017	April 28, 2022	
	Gordon M. Johnson	Democratic	Speaker pro tempore	New Jersey General Assembly	May 24, 2018	January 11, 2022	
	Janet Buckner	Democratic	Speaker pro tempore	Colorado House of Representatives	January 4, 2019	January 13, 2021	
	Sheree Sample-Hughes	Democratic	Speaker pro tempore	Maryland House of Delegates	September 9, 2019	January 10, 2024	
	Chris Welch	Democratic	Speaker	Illinois House of Representatives	January 13, 2021	Incumbent	
	Jehan Gordon-Booth	Democratic	Speaker pro tempore	Illinois House of Representatives	January 21, 2021	Incumbent	
	Benjie Wimberly	Democratic	Speaker pro tempore	New Jersey General Assembly	January 11, 2022	January 16, 2025	
	Rachel Talbot Ross	Democratic	Speaker	Maine House of Representatives	December 7, 2022	December 4, 2024	
	Joe Tate	Democratic	Speaker	Michigan House of Representatives	January 1, 2023	January 8, 2025	
	Joanna McClinton	Democratic	Speaker	Pennsylvania House of Representatives	February 28, 2023	Incumbent	
	Don Scott	Democratic	Speaker	Virginia House of Delegates	January 10, 2024	Incumbent	
	Melissa Minor-Brown	Democratic	Speaker	Delaware House of Representatives	January 14, 2025	Incumbent	
	Lisa Demuth	Republican	Speaker	Minnesota House of Representatives	February 6, 2025	Incumbent	
	Joseline Peña-Melnyk	Democratic	Speaker	Maryland House of Delegates	December 16, 2025	Incumbent	
