= Stacy-Marie Ishmael =

Journalist and editor

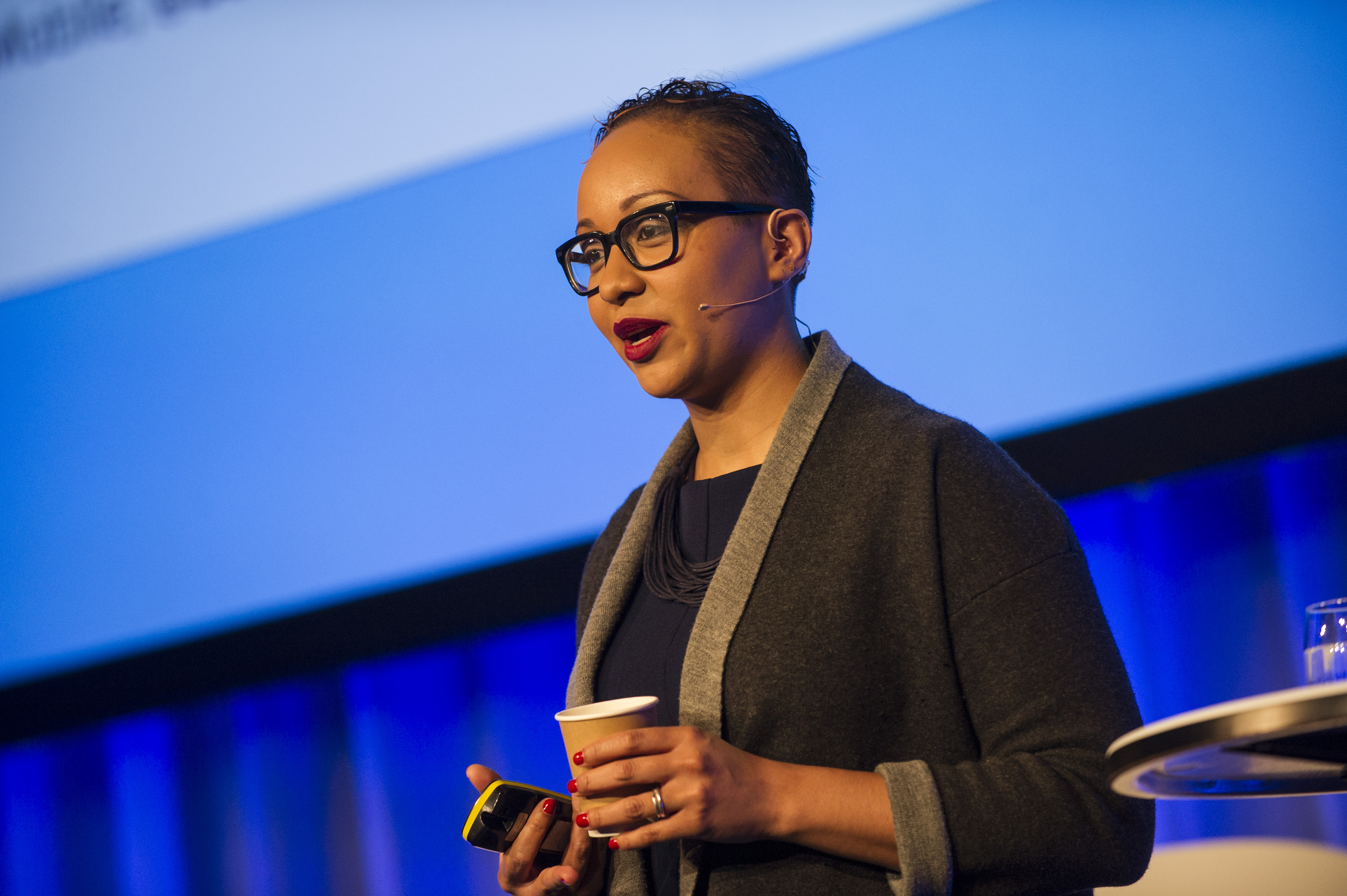
Stacy-Marie Ishmael, 2016

Stacy-Marie Ishmael is a journalist and editor from Trinidad and Tobago. She is currently the managing editor for crypto at Bloomberg News and the chair of the Foundation Board of the Craig Newmark Graduate School of Journalism.

== Career ==
She was born and raised in San Fernando, Trinidad, where she went to Naparima Girls' High School, graduating in 2002 and then moving to Europe. She attended University of Franche-Comté and the London School of Economics, going on to become in 2006 a graduate trainee at the Financial Times (FT). There, Ishmael started Alphaville, one of the FT's first blogs. Business Insider described her work as "ridiculously knowledgeable" as well as "great on camera" in appearances for CNBC. Ishmael has also drawn praise for "astute" commentary on hiring and organizational diversity.

After five years at the FT, Ishmael departed for technology company Percolate, but returned in 2013 to the FT, where she became vice-president for communities, working with the FT Live series that produces 200 events a year.

Ishmael moved to BuzzFeed in 2014 as managing editor of mobile news as the company developed a news app, which launched in June 2015. She has also been a regular guest on BuzzFeed's popular podcast Another Round, hosting a segment called "Stacy's Career Corner". The Frisky praised Ishmael's advice for negotiations as "absolutely required listening for anyone who’s ever been afraid of walking into a room and asking for what they want" and said her recurring segment "is competent, clear-headed and extremely useful. It’s the kind of advice you wish you had when faced with a work challenge; it’s the advice you want when navigating the trenches of a workplace peppered with microaggressions and untoward overtures...It’s the kind of advice I wish I’d had when I was a young person figuring out how to navigate a world that they don’t prepare you for in college."

In 2016–17 Ishmael was a John S. Knight Journalism Fellow at Stanford.

From 2017 to 2019, Ishmael worked as senior editor at Apple.

In February 2020, the nonprofit Texas Tribune named Ishmael as editorial director, calling her "a superlative journalist and inspiring leader, role model and public citizen." She led the newsroom through the peak of the coronavirus pandemic and a severe winter storm that caused massive power outages.

Ishmael then co-hosted the Slate Money podcast from May 2021 to the beginning of 2022.

Bloomberg News announced in September 2021 that it was hiring Ishmael to be its managing editor for cryptocurrencies.
