= Demmette Guidry =

American music industry executive

Demmette W. Guidry
- Born: Demmette Guidry; Los Angeles, California, U.S.
- Genres: R&B, soul, vintage music, hip hop, gospel, popular music
- Occupations: Music industry executive, entrepreneur, record label owner, talent manager
- Years active: 2001–present
- Labels: Columbia Records, Warner Bros. Records Music World Entertainment/ Sanctuary Urban

Demmette Guidry is an American music industry executive, talent manager and label owner, who helped launch the careers of many prominent recording artists, including Beyoncé, Lauryn Hill, Maxwell, Cypress Hill, Mary Mary, Alicia Keys and several others.

He is the founder of Atlanta-based F.O.E. Entertainment, LLC and its associated D-Media, LLC, encompassing the marketing, production, promotion and distribution of music entertainment products.

== Career ==
=== Positions and accomplishments ===
Guidry has served in many senior leadership roles as both an entrepreneur and most notably as a corporate executive in the capacities of Vice President of Marketing and later Senior Vice President for Columbia Records, Senior Vice President of Urban Music for Warner Bros. Records and Vice President, General Manager for Music World Entertainment/ Sanctuary Urban.

=== Associated artists ===
Guidry is best known for developing and launching award winning music careers including The Fugees, Maxwell, Alicia Keys, Jagged Edge, Destiny's Child, Cypress Hill, Bow Wow, Jaheim, Leela James, 50 Cent, Kenny Lattimore, Mary Mary and many more.

=== Entertainment marketing ===
His work as a marketer includes overseeing and managing the fiscal success of big marketing and branding campaigns for performers like Will Smith, Lauryn Hill, Beyoncé, Wyclef Jean, Nas, Mariah Carey and Jermaine Dupri. Guidry's work also includes overseeing soundtrack marketing for movies such as Love Jones, The Best Man, The Brothers and Men in Black.

=== Gospel music industry ===
Guidry's activity in the Gospel Music field led him to launch his first entrepreneurial venture, YYSMAN, Inc., a faith based entertainment company responsible for overseeing the careers of gospel music artists Mary Mary, PJ Morton, Men of Standard, Darwin Hobbs, Ted & Sheri and Myron Butler & Levi all staples on the Billboard charts for Gospel.

=== YYSMAN, Inc. Music World Entertainment, Sanctuary, Plc. partnership ===
As a result of Guidry's success in Gospel Music, his firm YYSMAN, Inc entered into a partnership venture with Mathew Knowles and UK based entertainment company Sanctuary, Plc. to launch one of the first full service entertainment companies in the music industry. As the General Manager of Music World Entertainment/ Sanctuary Urban, Guidry was responsible for the day-to-day operations and a roster that included Mary J Blige, Ray J, Nelly, Floetry, Earth Wind & Fire, The O'Jays, Beyoncé, Destiny's Child, Keith Sweat, Chaka Khan, De La Soul, Jon B and Sunshine Anderson and several other musical artists.

=== Current ===
Guidry resides in Atlanta, GA, and is Co-Founder of the Black American Music Association, a 501(c)(6) trade organization created to Preserve, Protect, and Promote the Legacy and the Future of Authentic Black American Music. He is Founder F.O.E. Entertainment, LLC and its associated D-Media, LLC.
