= Tracy Clayton =

American writer

- Born: April 29, 1982 (age 44)
- Education: Transylvania University
- Occupations: Writer, podcaster
- Employer: Netflix
- Known for: Another Round

Tracy Clayton (born April 29, 1982) is an American writer who served as the co-host of the BuzzFeed podcast Another Round. She hosted the Netflix podcast Strong Black Legends, for which she interviews African Americans in the entertainment industry about their craft. Clayton and Josh Gwynn co-hosted the Pineapple Street Studios podcast Back Issue, which discusses moments in past popular culture and their impact on the present.

== Early life ==
Clayton was raised in Louisville, Kentucky, and received her bachelor's degree from Transylvania University in Lexington.

== Career ==
Clayton has written for MadameNoire, Uptown, The Urban Daily, HuffPost, PostBourgie, and The Root, and worked at BuzzFeed full-time from 2014 to 2018. She developed the popular Tumblr blog "Little Known Black History Facts", which featured on Another Round.

She was named the Ida B. Wells Media Expert-in-Residence at Wake Forest University's Anna Julia Cooper Center from 2016 to 2017.

=== Another Round ===
Clayton and her Buzzfeed co-worker Heben Nigatu launched the first episode of Another Round, produced by BuzzFeed, on March 24, 2015. The show received positive critical acclaim. The A.V. Club described Clayton and Nigatu as "passionate and sharp in their distinct points of view." It was named to best of 2015 lists by ITunes, Slate, Vulture, and The Atlantic.

An Okayplayer profile by Kevin L. Clark wrote: "Known all over the digital world as one of the sharpest voices in the podcast game as well as Black Twitter, Tracy Clayton is consistently one of the smartest people in whatever room she occupies." Elle praised Clayton and Nigatu's ability to "serve up a blend of humor, politics, and frank observation that not even the most deft hosts can seem to replicate." Fast Company named them two of the most creative businesspeople of 2016. Clayton received media attention in the fall of 2015 when she pressed then-presidential candidate Hillary Clinton on the podcast about the crime bill her husband passed as president and its harmful impact on Black people. The Guardian praised Clayton and Nigatu's work as "witty, irreverent, [and] intelligent." Also writing for The Guardian, critic Sasha Frere-Jones called Clayton and Nigatu "leading American cultural critics."

Clayton announced she had been laid off by BuzzFeed on September 19, 2018, along with most of the other staffers who had worked on BuzzFeed's original podcasts.

=== Strong Black Legends ===
On February 11, 2019, Netflix's Strong Black Lead initiative announced it was launching a new podcast featuring interviews with well-known Black members of Hollywood, called Strong Black Legends, to be hosted by Clayton. The first podcast episode premiered on February 12, 2019, with Lynn Whitfield as the inaugural guest. Strong Black Legends quickly rose to No. 1 on Apple's TV Film & Podcast chart and won a Webby Award in the category Podcasts - Television & Film in 2021.

=== Back Issue ===
Clayton also hosted the interview podcast Going Through It launched by Mailchimp in July 2020, featuring 14 prominent Black women.

In August 2020, Back Issue debuted, a podcast hosted by Clayton and Josh Gwynn. Back Issue was produced by Pineapple Street Studios and looked back at formative moments in popular culture. Clayton and Gwynn formerly worked together on Strong Black Legends. Back Issue won Best Music Podcast at the Black Podcasting Awards in 2023.

== Recognition ==
She was named one of Fast Company's "Most Creative People in Business" in 2016, The Root 100's "Most Influential African Americans" in 2016, and Ebony's "Power 100 Disruptors" in 2017.
