= Gertrude Pocte Geddes Willis =

American funeral director (1878–1970)

- Born: Gertrude Pocte; March 9, 1878; Happy Jack, Louisiana, US
- Died: February 20, 1970 (aged 91–92); New Orleans, Louisiana, US
- Occupation: Businesswoman
- Spouses: Clem Geddes; William A. Willis

Gertrude Pocte Geddes Willis (March 9, 1878 – February 20, 1970) founded the Gertrude Geddes Willis Life Insurance Company and Gertrude Geddes Willis Funeral Home in New Orleans, Louisiana. She was one of the first women funeral directors in New Orleans.

== Biography ==
Willis née Pocte was born in Happy Jack, Louisiana, on March 9, 1878, the daughter of Oscar Pocte and Louisa Woods Pocte.

Her first husband Clem Geddes was in the funeral business. The couple partnered with Arnold Moss to form a company that sold insurance as well as owning a funeral home.

After Clem Geddes died in 1913, she married William A. Willis. In 1940, she renamed the business the Gertrude Geddes Willis Funeral Home and Life Insurance Company. When William A. Willis died, Gertrude continued running the company, expanding its services.

Geddes was a member of the NAACP, the YWCA, and the Ladies Auxiliary of the Knights of Peter Claver.

She died on February 20, 1970, in New Orleans.
