= Monica Richardson =

American newspaper editor

- Born: Charlottesville, Virginia, U.S.
- Education: Old Dominion University
- Occupation: Senior vice president
- Employer: USA Today
- Children: 1

Monica R. Richardson is an American newspaper editor. She is senior vice president of USA Today and previously was the first Black executive editor in the Miami Herald's history.

== Personal and education ==
Richardson is from Charlottesville, Virginia. She graduated from Old Dominion University.

She has served on nonprofit boards in Atlanta and advocates for foster care and adoption. 2014, she adopted a daughter as a single mother

== Career and work ==
Richardson became executive editor of Miami Herald on January 1, 2021. Her expertise includes nearly 30 years of journalism.

Richardson worked for the Charlottesville Observer, The Florida Times-Union, and Lexington Herald-Leader. For 15 years, she wrote for the Atlanta Journal-Constitution where she served as the digital managing editor and then was promoted to senior managing editor in 2018.

She served on journalist boards, including the Atlanta Press Club, the Atlanta Association of Black Journalists, Associated Press Media Editors and the Georgia APME. She also served as a juror for the national Pulitzer Prize board.

In February 2024, Richardson was named senior vice president of USA Today.

== Awards ==
She has been named one of the Atlanta Business League's Top 100 Women of Vision, the First but Not the Last, Women Leaders of South Florida, as well as the Editor and Publisher's Top Ten Women to Watch list. She has also received an Atlanta Diverse Professionals Award.
