= Bean pie =

Sweet custard pie

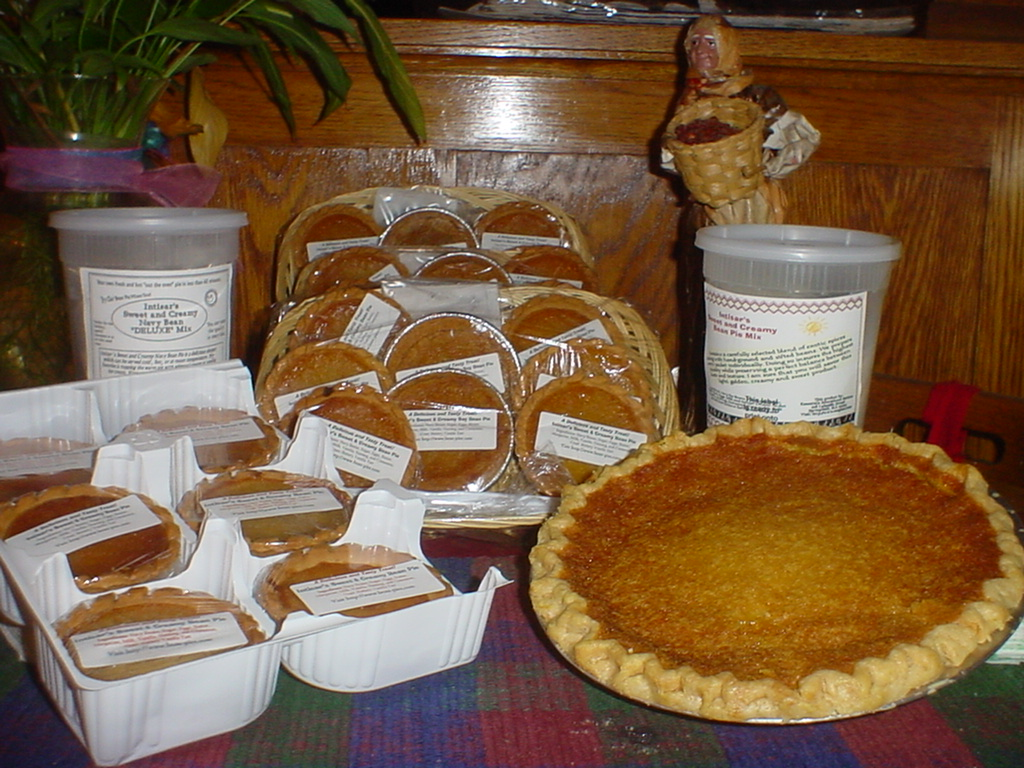
- A selection of bean pies
- Type: Pie
- Place of origin: United States
- Main ingredients: Beans (usually navy beans); Sugar; Butter; Milk; Spices

A bean pie is a sweet custard pie whose filling consists of mashed beans (usually navy beans), sugar, eggs, milk, butter and spices. Common spices and flavorings include vanilla, cinnamon and nutmeg. Variations can include cloves, ginger, pumpkin pie spice and lemon extract.

== History ==
In 1884, a recipe for bean pie was published in the New Kentucky Home Cook Book, contributed by Lucy Keith and compiled by the ladies of the Methodist Episcopal Church, Maysville, Kentucky. According to her obituary, "she was a typical daughter of the old South, noted for her kindness and charity and was a life long member of the M.E. Church, South."

Bean pies are now commonly associated with African American Muslims' cuisine as an alternative to soul foods, except those containing vanilla extract or imitation vanilla extract as they contain alcohol. The pies are also specifically associated with the Nation of Islam movement and Elijah Muhammad, who encouraged their consumption instead of certain ingredients associated with soul food.

Members of the community commonly sell bean pies as part of their fundraising efforts. The bean pie was allegedly introduced by W. D. Fard, who was a restaurateur in the 1910s and 1920s prior to founding the Nation of Islam in 1930.

=== Muhammad Ali ===
Lana Shabazz, the personal chef for boxer Muhammad Ali, included a recipe for bean pie in her cookbook, Cooking for the Champ. According to Shabazz's cookbook, Ali blamed his 1971 loss to Joe Frazier on bean pie, as he had been unable to resist eating it during his training.

== See also ==
- List of custard desserts
- List of pies, tarts and flans
- Pie in American cuisine
