= Jamil Smith (journalist) =

American print and television journalist

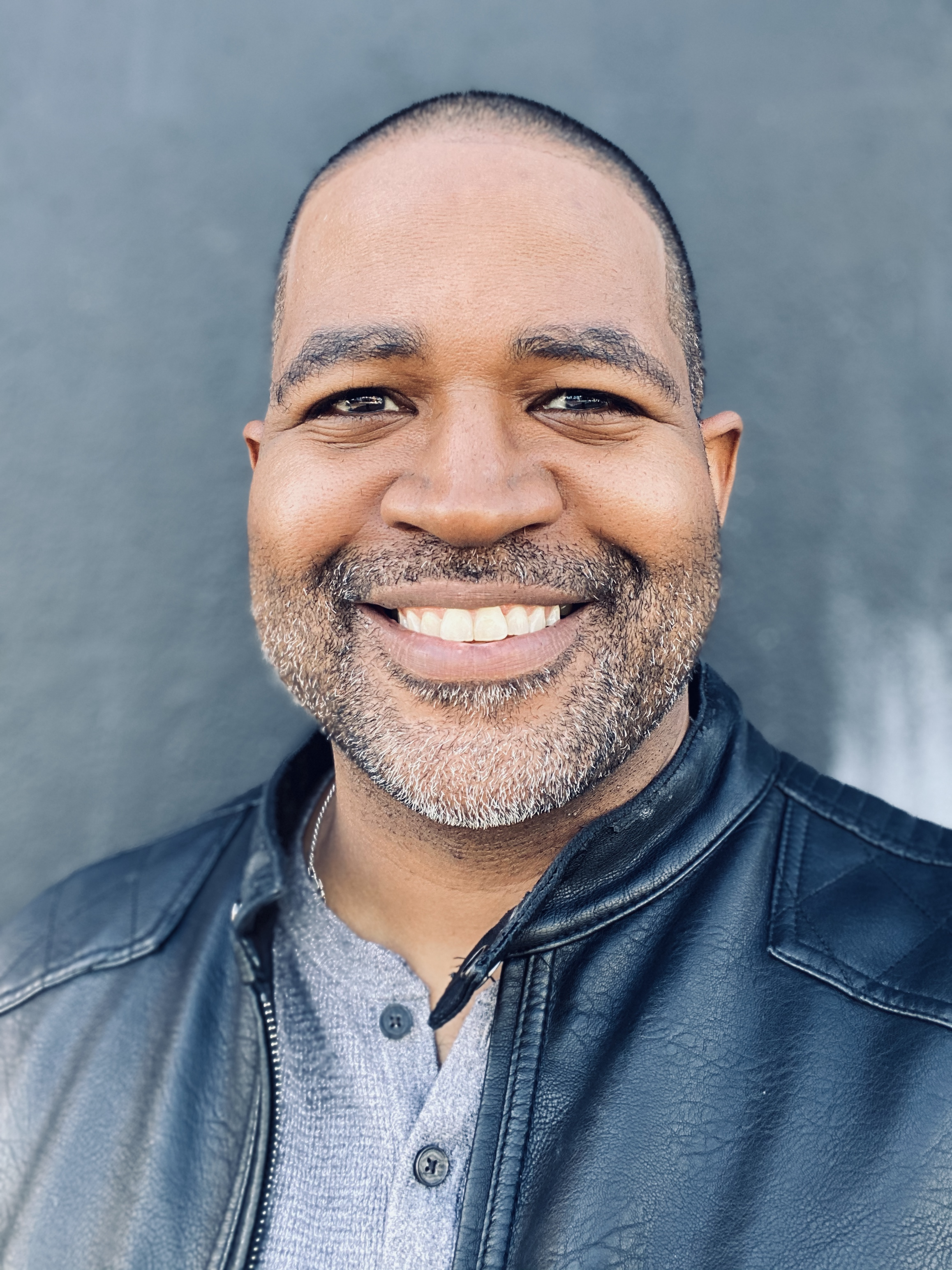
- Smith in January 2020
- Born: September 23, 1975 (age 51); Cleveland, Ohio
- Education: University of Pennsylvania
- Occupations: Journalist; Television producer
- Years active: 2002–present
- Employer: Los Angeles Times
- Notable credits: Inside The NFL; Hard Knocks; The Rachel Maddow Show; Melissa Harris-Perry
- Awards: Sports Emmy Awards (2006, 2009 and 2010)
- Website: twitter.com/JamilSmith

Jamil Smith (born September 23, 1975) is an American print and television journalist. After working as an essayist at the Los Angeles Times, he became the editor-in-chief of The Emancipator in November 2023. His reporting and commentary deal with a range of political and cultural topics, including race, gender, national politics, and pop culture. He has been a senior editor at The New Republic, and a senior national correspondent at MTV News, a senior writer for Rolling Stone magazine, and a senior correspondent at Vox.

While a television segment producer for NFL Films, Smith won three Sports Emmy Awards, in 2006, 2009, and 2010. He has also served as a producer for The Rachel Maddow Show and Melissa Harris-Perry.

== Early life ==
Born September 23, 1975, in Cleveland, Ohio, Smith attended Hawken School through eighth grade, then graduated from Shaker Heights High School in 1993. While attending Shaker Heights High School, Smith wrote for the student newspaper, The Shakerite, for four years, as well as participating in the wrestling and track teams and the school's Minority Achievement Community program, where black upperclassmen with high grade point averages mentor black freshman and sophomore boys with lower GPAs.

Smith then attended the University of Pennsylvania and graduated with a bachelor's degree in English in 1997. While in college, Smith wrote for the campus student newspaper, The Daily Pennsylvanian, and participated in Students Together Against Acquaintance Rape. He also studied abroad at King's College London.

== Career ==
After four years as an assistant at the William Morris Agency, Smith began his career in television and film production in 2002 as a production assistant with CNN. He next went to HBO Sports, then NFL Films, where he worked on production teams that won three Sports Emmys, two for Inside the NFL and another for the Cincinnati Bengals installment of the Hard Knocks series. In 2010, Smith joined MSNBC, serving as a producer for both The Rachel Maddow Show and Melissa Harris-Perry.

As a journalist and commentator, Smith has drawn notice for work on a range of political and cultural topics, including race and racism, police brutality, feminism and gender roles, and national politics.

Smith joined The New Republic in January 2015, part of a wave of new hires following the 2014 removal of editor-in-chief Franklin Foer, which prompted the departure of 55 staff members and contributors. Foer's replacement, Gabriel Snyder, hired Smith as a senior editor covering race, politics and gender. With the magazine facing criticism both from those upset by changes at the long-standing institution and also from those critical of the magazine's history, particularly its treatment of race-related topics, Smith described his role, with colleagues, as aiming "to help usher this magazine into a different era." While at The New Republic, Smith also launched and hosted the magazine's first podcast, Intersection.

In 2016, Smith became a senior national correspondent for MTV News, hired alongside writers and editors including Ana Marie Cox, Jessica Hopper, Charles Aaron, Meredith Graves, Doreen St. Félix, and Ira Madison III as part of a significant expansion of MTV News programming. Among other on-air appearances for MTV, Smith served as a co-host, with Charlamagne Tha God, Marc Lamont Hill and Franchesca Ramsey, of the joint MTV-BET townhall "What Now", following the police shooting deaths of Alton Sterling and Philando Castile and the shooting of police officers in Dallas that all took place in the first week of July 2016. At MTV, Smith also hosted The Racket, a YouTube series on politics, especially the US Presidential campaign. He also appeared on the MTV News podcast The Stakes, including hosting an episode commemorating the 25th anniversary of the 1992 Los Angeles riots.

After layoffs at MTV News in June 2017, Smith became a freelance reporter and opinion writer, writing (among other works) "The Revolutionary Power of Black Panther," the cover story for Time magazine's February 19, 2018 issue; this made Black Panther the first Marvel Cinematic Universe film to be featured on Time's cover. In his analysis, Smith argued the film was culturally significant as proof that African-American narratives can be commercial successes with all audiences, as well as that "making movies about black lives is part of showing that they matter."

Smith joined Rolling Stone as senior writer in March 2018. In addition to his regular columns, Smith profiled, among others, U.S. Senator and presidential candidate Kamala Harris and interviewed Rep. John Lewis, Los Angeles mayor Eric Garcetti, and Georgia gubernatorial candidate Stacey Abrams. He called for Joe Biden to drop out of the 2020 Democratic Party presidential primaries in September 2019, for lacking "even the vocabulary to engage in an antiracist conversation".

Smith contributed an essay entitled "She Can't Breathe" to the anti-rape anthology Believe Me: How Trusting Women Can Change the World, published in January 2020 by Seal Press.

In January 2020, Smith joined The Guardian as a columnist.

In September 2022, Smith joined the Los Angeles Times as an essayist.

== Honors ==
While a segment producer at NFL Films, Smith was part of teams that won the 2006 and 2009 Outstanding Studio Show – Weekly Sports Emmy for Inside the NFL and the 2010 Outstanding Edited Sports Series/Anthology Sports Emmy for Hard Knocks: Training Camp With The Cincinnati Bengals.

Smith has repeatedly been named to The Root 100 list of leading black influencers, including in 2011 for his work on The Rachel Maddow Show, in 2013 for his work on Melissa Harris-Perry, and in 2015 for his work at The New Republic, where, The Root wrote, he "hits on cultural touch points from campus rape to the Rev. Al Sharpton, banging out a nice mix of opinion, headlines and original reporting."

For his Time cover story on Black Panther, Smith received the Arts Reporting award in May 2019 from the Deadline Club, the New York City chapter of the Society of Professional Journalists. According to the judges' comments, the story "managed to approach an extremely well-covered topic from a fresh angle and in an intimate voice. Smith employed unique use of the first-person voice (and even the second-person "you") to bring in his own perspective while also addressing the reader. And he placed "Black Panther" in both current and historical political perspective."

== Personal life ==
In 2017, Smith moved from Brooklyn, New York, to Los Angeles, California.

== See also ==
- Rachel Maddow
- Melissa Harris-Perry
- Chris Hayes
- Gene Demby
- Joy-Ann Reid
- Larry Wilmore
