= Shani Hilton =

Journalist and editor

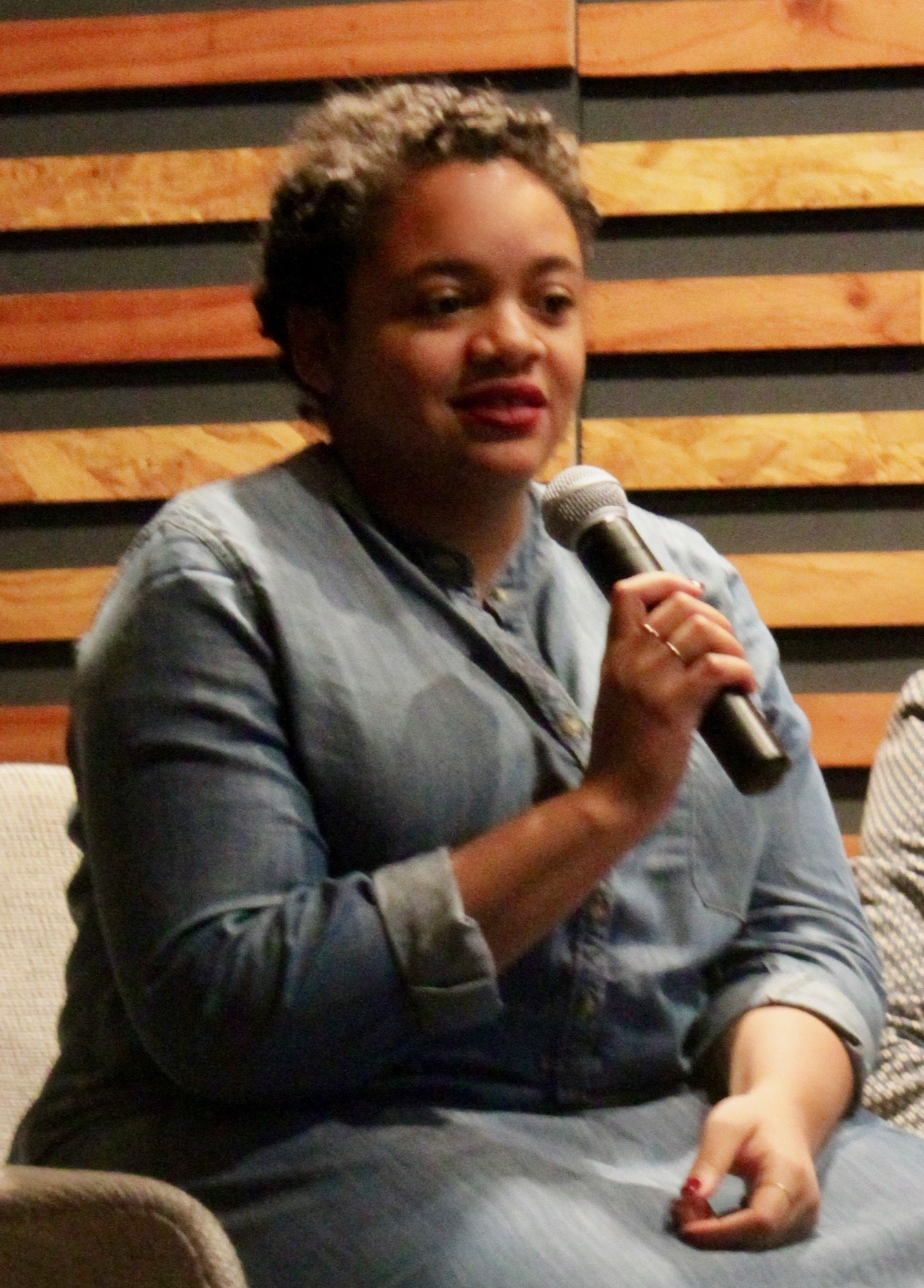
- Shani Hilton in 2017
- Born: Shani Olisa Hilton
- Education: Howard University (BA)
- Occupations: Editor, media executive
- Years active: 2010–present
- Employer: Los Angeles Times
- Website: buzzfeed.com/shani

Shani Olisa Hilton (born 1986) is an American journalist and media executive, formerly the Deputy Managing Editor at the Los Angeles Times. Prior to the Times, Hilton was the executive editor at BuzzFeed News.

== Early life ==
Growing up with a journalist father, Hilton began working on the student newspaper in middle school and continued at Bear Creek High School in Stockton, California. She attended Howard University in D.C. and studied journalism.

== Career ==
A few years out of college, Hilton joined BuzzFeed in 2013 as senior editor, after working at the Washington City Paper and NBC Washington. She was promoted to executive editor in September 2014. Politico called her "the youthful conscience of Buzzfeed News" and Recode "Buzzfeed's Newsmaker in Chief." The New York Observer named her to a list of "10 Players in Media You Must Hire."

Hilton is regularly cited as an expert on topics like journalistic ethics, millennial audiences for news media, and diversity in the newsroom. She wrote a widely cited essay on the subject in 2014, entitled "Building A Diverse Newsroom Is Work".

She is the editor-in-chief since 2024 of the nonprofit news organization Civic News Company.
