= Code Switch =

Podcast about race and culture

- Genre: Race and culture
- Language: English

Production
- Length: About 30 minutes

Publication
- Original release: May 2016
- Provider: National Public Radio
- Updates: Weekly

Code Switch is an NPR podcast and section covering race and culture. It began in 2013 as a blog and a series of stories on NPR radio programs. The Code Switch podcast launched in 2016, hosted by Gene Demby and Shereen Marisol Meraji. In 2022, B.A. Parker joined as a co-host. In 2020, in the wake of the George Floyd protests, Code Switch became one of NPR's top ranked podcasts and was named Apple's Podcast of the Year.

== History ==
Code Switch was launched in 2013 with a $1.5 million grant from the Corporation for Public Broadcasting; it developed as a blog and contributed stories to a variety of NPR programs. Harvard's Neiman Lab reported that the project was "designed to increase coverage of race issues and reach out to new audiences" at NPR and affiliated media outlets.

The blog began publishing on April 7, 2013, with Gene Demby's introductory essay "How Code-Switching Explains The World". The project's name refers to the linguistic phenomenon of code-switching, when speakers move between multiple languages or dialects. Demby wrote that Code Switch intended to reflect the phenomenon holistically, investigating how people float "between different cultural and linguistic spaces and different parts of our own identities—sometimes within a single interaction."

== Content ==
Neiman Lab said in 2015 that Code Switch "has grown into a place where reporters tries to consider issues around race with nuance, whether that's the myth of the colorblind millennial, or going deep on the hit Broadway musical Hamilton." The outlet has also drawn notice for reporting and commentary on topics ranging from sports and reality television, to the Supreme Court.

Code Switch founder and reporter Kat Chow has also described the project as especially interested in the "second beat" of a story, asking, "What is there to report on that hasn't already been said?" with regard to a breaking or trending story.

In May 2016, Code Switch debuted as a podcast. Episodes are released weekly on Wednesdays.

== Staff ==
Team members have included Gene Demby, who is lead blogger and cohosts the podcast with reporter Shereen Marisol Meraji; Tasneem Raja, senior digital editor; supervising senior producer Alicia Montgomery; Matt Thompson and Kat Chow.

== Awards and reception ==
Code Switch won the Online News Association for best online commentary at a large outlet in 2014. In 2015, the National Association of Hispanic Journalists awarded Shereen Marisol Meraji the "Radio, Feature News – Large Market" award for her Code Switch segment "Tandas".

In December 2020, Apple Podcasts announced that Code Switch had been selected as Show of the Year, marking the first time that Apple Podcasts recognized a single podcast of the year. In 2021, Code Switch won an Ambie Award for Best Society and Culture Podcast. In 2024, Code Switch won the Ambie Award for Best Scriptwriting, Non-fiction.

Despite generally positive reaction to the blog, some users in early years complained about practices and policies on moderating comments.

== See also ==
- Public broadcasting
- Race and ethnicity in the United States
- Political podcast
