= 1977 in the United States =

- Decades: 1950s; 1960s; 1970s; 1980s; 1990s
- See also: History of the United States (1964–1980); Timeline of United States history (1970–1989); List of years in the United States

Events from the year 1977 in the United States.

== Incumbents ==
=== Federal government ===
- President:

Gerald Ford (R-Michigan) (until January 20)
Jimmy Carter (D-Georgia) (starting January 20)

- Vice President:

Nelson Rockefeller (R-New York) (until January 20)
Walter Mondale (D-Minnesota) (starting January 20)

- Chief Justice: Warren E. Burger (Virginia)
- Speaker of the House of Representatives:

Carl Albert (D-Oklahoma) (until January 3)
Tip O'Neill (D-Massachusetts) (starting January 4)

- Senate Majority Leader:

Mike Mansfield (D-Montana) (until January 3)
Robert Byrd (D-West Virginia) (starting January 3)

- Congress: 94th (until January 3), 95th (starting January 3)

==== State governments ====
Governors and lieutenant governors

=== Governors ===
- Governor of Alabama: George Wallace (Democratic)
- Governor of Alaska: Jay Hammond (Republican)
- Governor of Arizona: Raul Hector Castro (Democratic) (until October 20), Wesley Bolin (Democratic) (starting October 20)
- Governor of Arkansas: David Pryor (Democratic)
- Governor of California: Jerry Brown (Democratic)
- Governor of Colorado: Richard Lamm (Democratic)
- Governor of Connecticut: Ella T. Grasso (Democratic)
- Governor of Delaware: Sherman W. Tribbitt (Democratic) (until January 18), Pierre S. du Pont, IV (Republican) (starting January 18)
- Governor of Florida: Reubin Askew (Democratic)
- Governor of Georgia: George Busbee (Democratic)
- Governor of Hawaii: George Ariyoshi (Democratic)
- Governor of Idaho: Cecil D. Andrus (Democratic) (until January 24), John V. Evans (Democratic) (starting January 24)
- Governor of Illinois: Dan Walker (Democratic) (until January 10), James R. Thompson (Republican) (starting January 10)
- Governor of Indiana: Otis R. Bowen (Republican)
- Governor of Iowa: Robert D. Ray (Republican)
- Governor of Kansas: Robert F. Bennett (Republican)
- Governor of Kentucky: Julian M. Carroll (Democratic)
- Governor of Louisiana: Edwin W. Edwards (Democratic)
- Governor of Maine: James B. Longley (Independent)
- Governor of Maryland: Marvin Mandel (Democratic)
- Governor of Massachusetts: Michael Dukakis (Democratic)
- Governor of Michigan: William Milliken (Republican)
- Governor of Minnesota: Rudy Perpich (Democratic)
- Governor of Mississippi: Cliff Finch (Democratic)
- Governor of Missouri: Kit Bond (Republican) (until January 10), Joseph P. Teasdale (Democratic) (starting January 10)
- Governor of Montana: Thomas Lee Judge (Democratic)
- Governor of Nebraska: J. James Exon (Democratic)
- Governor of Nevada: Mike O'Callaghan (Democratic)
- Governor of New Hampshire: Meldrim Thomson Jr. (Republican)
- Governor of New Jersey: Brendan Byrne (Democratic)
- Governor of New Mexico: Jerry Apodaca (Democratic)
- Governor of New York: Hugh Carey (Democratic)
- Governor of North Carolina: James Holshouser (Republican) (until January 8), Jim Hunt (Democratic) (starting January 8)
- Governor of North Dakota: Arthur A. Link (Democratic)
- Governor of Ohio: Jim Rhodes (Republican)
- Governor of Oklahoma: David L. Boren (Democratic)
- Governor of Oregon: Robert W. Straub (Democratic)
- Governor of Pennsylvania: Milton Shapp (Democratic)
- Governor of Rhode Island: Philip W. Noel (Democratic) (until January 4), J. Joseph Garrahy (Democratic) (starting January 4)
- Governor of South Carolina: James B. Edwards (Republican)
- Governor of South Dakota: Richard F. Kneip (Democratic)
- Governor of Tennessee: Ray Blanton (Democratic)
- Governor of Texas: Dolph Briscoe (Democratic)
- Governor of Utah: Cal Rampton (Democratic) (until January 3), Scott M. Matheson (Democratic) (starting January 3)
- Governor of Vermont: Thomas P. Salmon (Democratic) (until January 6), Richard A. Snelling (Republican) (starting January 6)
- Governor of Virginia: Mills E. Godwin Jr. (Republican)
- Governor of Washington: Daniel J. Evans (Republican) (until January 12), Dixy Lee Ray (Democratic) (starting January 12)
- Governor of West Virginia: Arch A. Moore Jr. (Republican) (until January 17), Jay Rockefeller (Democratic) (starting January 17)
- Governor of Wisconsin: Patrick J. Lucey (Democratic) (until July 6), Martin J. Schreiber (Democratic) (starting July 6)
- Governor of Wyoming: Edgar J. Herschler (Democratic)

=== Lieutenant governors ===
- Lieutenant Governor of Alabama: Jere Beasley (Democratic)
- Lieutenant Governor of Alaska: Lowell Thomas Jr. (Republican)
- Lieutenant Governor of Arkansas: Joe Purcell (Democratic)
- Lieutenant Governor of California: Mervyn M. Dymally (Democratic)
- Lieutenant Governor of Colorado: George L. Brown (Democratic)
- Lieutenant Governor of Connecticut: Robert K. Killian (Democratic)
- Lieutenant Governor of Delaware: Eugene Bookhammer (Republican) (until January 18), James D. McGinnis (Democratic) (starting January 18)
- Lieutenant Governor of Florida: J.H. Williams (Democratic)
- Lieutenant Governor of Georgia: Zell Miller (Democratic)
- Lieutenant Governor of Hawaii: Nelson Doi (Democratic)
- Lieutenant Governor of Idaho:
  - until January 24: John V. Evans (Democratic)
  - January 24-28: vacant
  - starting January 28: William J. Murphy (Democratic)
- Lieutenant Governor of Illinois: Neil Hartigan (Democratic) (until January 10), Dave O'Neal (Republican) (starting January 10)
- Lieutenant Governor of Indiana: Robert D. Orr (Republican)
- Lieutenant Governor of Iowa: Arthur A. Neu (Republican)
- Lieutenant Governor of Kansas: Shelby Smith (Republican)
- Lieutenant Governor of Kentucky: Thelma Stovall (Republican)
- Lieutenant Governor of Louisiana: Jimmy Fitzmorris (Democratic)
- Lieutenant Governor of Maryland: Blair Lee III (political party unknown)
- Lieutenant Governor of Massachusetts: Thomas P. O'Neill III (Democratic)
- Lieutenant Governor of Michigan: James Damman (Republican)
- Lieutenant Governor of Minnesota: Alec G. Olson (Democratic)
- Lieutenant Governor of Mississippi: Evelyn Gandy (Democratic)
- Lieutenant Governor of Missouri: William C. Phelps (Republican)
- Lieutenant Governor of Montana: Bill Christiansen (Democratic) (until January 3), Ted Schwinden (Democratic) (starting January 3)
- Lieutenant Governor of Nebraska: Gerald Whelan (Democratic)
- Lieutenant Governor of Nevada: Robert E. Rose (Democratic)
- Lieutenant Governor of New Mexico: Robert E. Ferguson (Democratic)
- Lieutenant Governor of New York: Mary Anne Krupsak (Democratic)
- Lieutenant Governor of North Carolina: Jim Hunt (Democratic) (until January 8), James C. Green (Democratic) (starting January 8)
- Lieutenant Governor of North Dakota: Wayne G. Sanstead (Democratic)
- Lieutenant Governor of Ohio: Dick Celeste (Democratic)
- Lieutenant Governor of Oklahoma: George Nigh (Democratic)
- Lieutenant Governor of Pennsylvania: Ernest P. Kline (Democratic)
- Lieutenant Governor of Rhode Island: J. Joseph Garrahy (Democratic) (until January 4), Thomas R. DiLuglio (Democratic) (starting January 4)
- Lieutenant Governor of South Carolina: W. Brantley Harvey Jr. (Democratic)
- Lieutenant Governor of South Dakota: Harvey L. Wollman (Democratic)
- Lieutenant Governor of Tennessee: John S. Wilder (Democratic)
- Lieutenant Governor of Texas: William P. Hobby Jr. (Democratic)
- Lieutenant Governor of Utah: Clyde L. Miller (Democratic) (until January 3), David Smith Monson (Republican) (starting January 3)
- Lieutenant Governor of Vermont: Brian D. Burns (Democratic) (until January 6), T. Garry Buckley (Republican) (starting January 6)
- Lieutenant Governor of Virginia: John N. Dalton (Republican)
- Lieutenant Governor of Washington: John Cherberg (Democratic)
- Lieutenant Governor of Wisconsin: Martin J. Schreiber (Democratic)

== Events ==
=== January ===
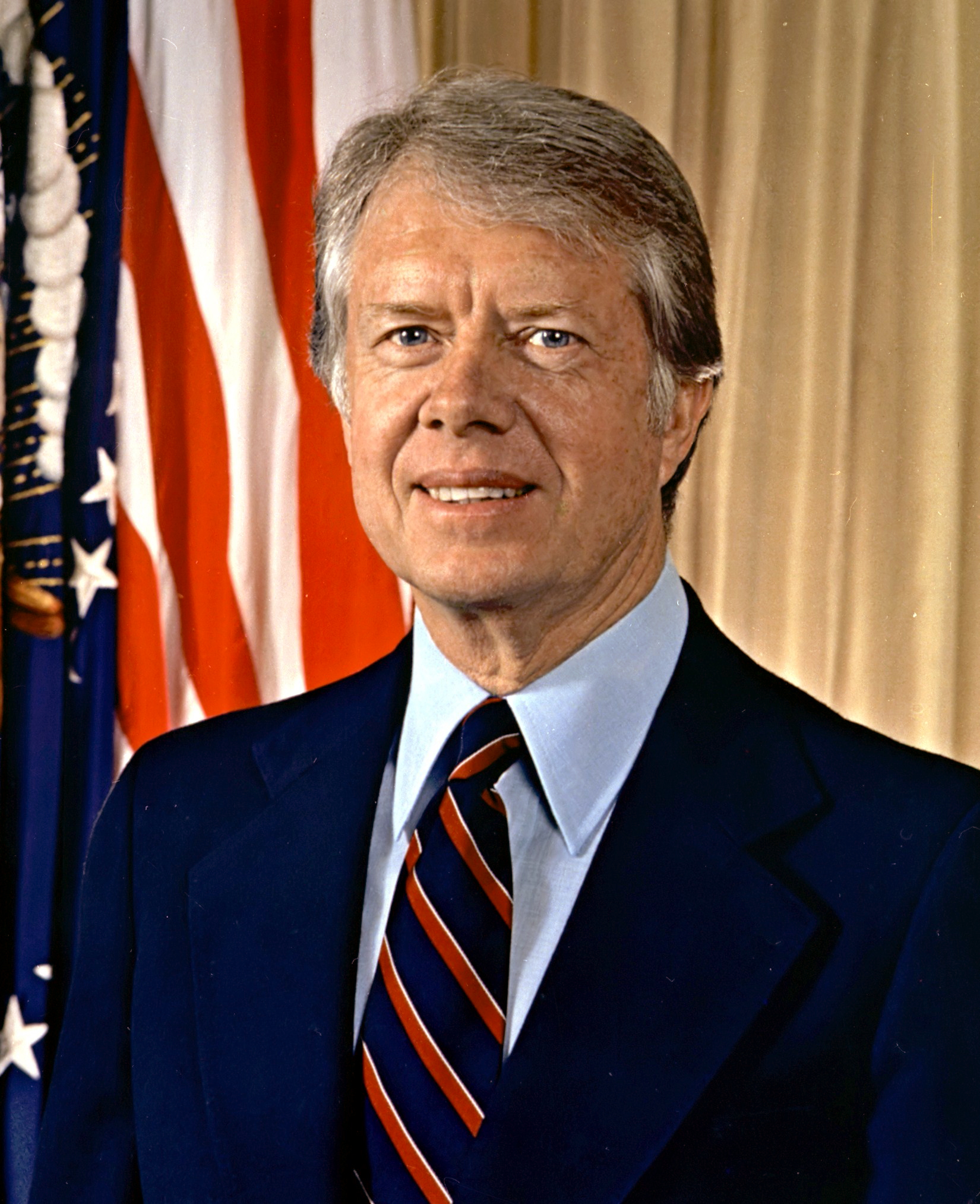
January 20: Jimmy Carter becomes the 39th U.S. president

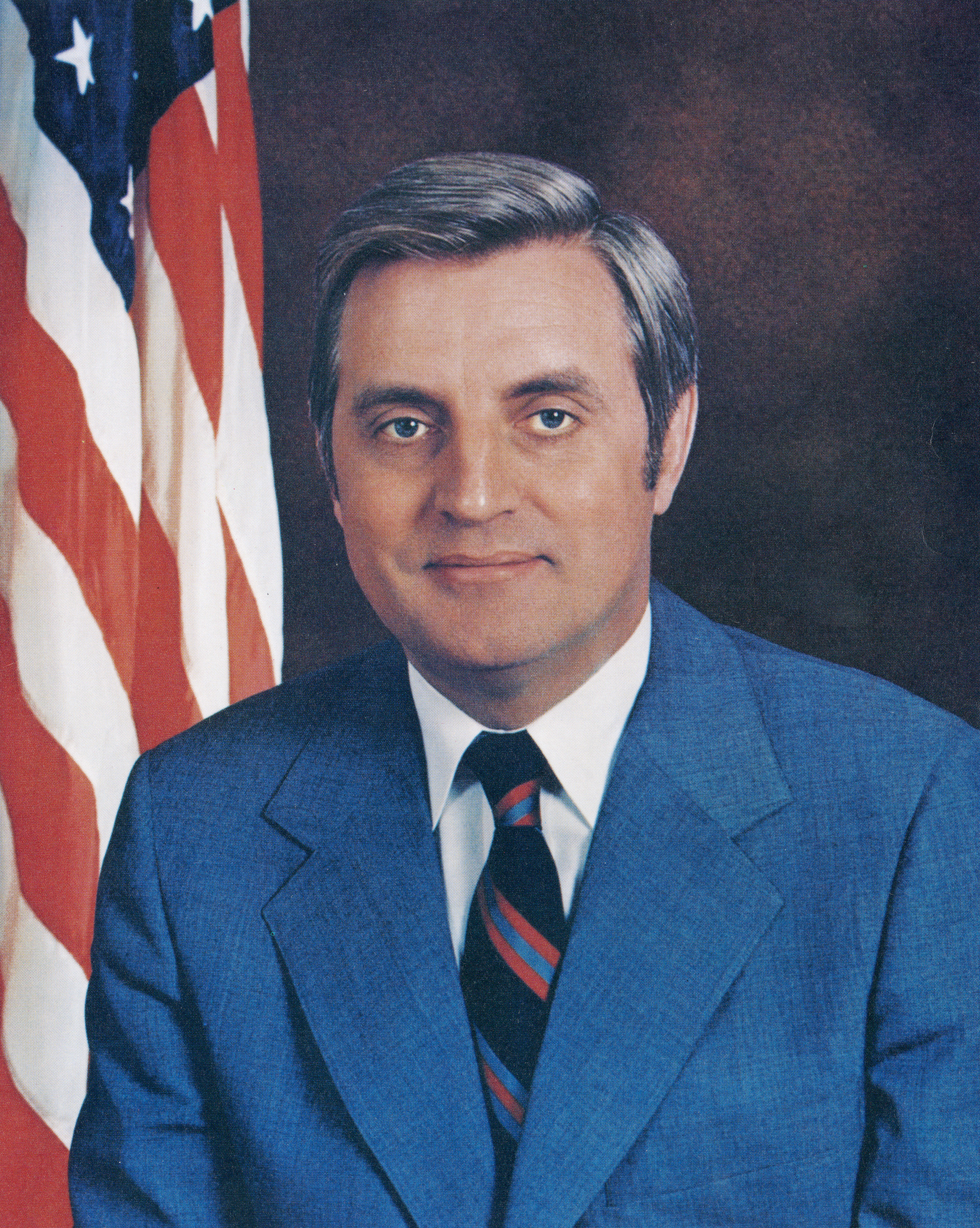
Walter Mondale becomes the 42nd U.S. vice president

- January
  - The world's first personal computer, the Commodore PET, is demonstrated at the winter Consumer Electronics Show in Chicago.
  - The Coalition of Free Men is founded in Baltimore, Maryland, in order to create a unified voice in addressing issues concerning men and boys. The organisation would later become the National Coalition for Men, America's oldest men's rights organization.
- January 3 – Apple Computer is incorporated.
- January 9
  - Super Bowl XI: The Oakland Raiders defeat the Minnesota Vikings 32–14 at the Rose Bowl in Pasadena, California.
  - Rock band Toto is founded by David Paich and Jeff Porcaro in Van Nuys, Los Angeles.
- January 13 – Japan Air Lines Cargo Flight 1045, a charter flight from Grant County, Washington to Tokyo, Japan, with a stopover in Anchorage, Alaska, stalls and crashes immediately after takeoff in Anchorage, killing all 5 people on board. The causes of the accident were later revealed to be drag on the aircraft by ice and an inebriated captain
- January 17 – In the first execution after the reintroduction of the death penalty in the United States, Gary Gilmore is executed by firing squad in Utah.
- January 19
  - Snow falls in Miami, Florida (despite its ordinarily tropical climate) for the only time in its history. Snowfall has occurred further south in the United States only on the high mountains of the state of Hawaii.
  - President Gerald Ford pardons Iva Toguri D'Aquino (aka “Tokyo Rose”).
- January 20 – Jimmy Carter is sworn in as the 39th president of the United States, and Walter F. Mondale is sworn in as the 42nd vice president.
- January 21 – President Jimmy Carter pardons Vietnam War draft evaders.
- January 23 – Roots begins its phenomenally successful run on ABC.
- January 28 – The Great Lakes Blizzard of 1977 hits Buffalo, New York.
- January 1–31
  - The contiguous US average monthly minimum temperature of 12.54 °F or −10.81 °C is the coldest for any month since nationwide records were first compiled in 1895. (Note: The mean temperature for January 1977 of 23.09 °F or −4.95 °C was the coldest since before 1895, but was broken in January 1979.)
  - In contrast to the contiguous US, Alaska had to that point (Note: Januaries 1981, 1985 and 2014 have since surpassed this figure, almost certainly largely due to man-made global warming.) its warmest January on record with a mean of 17.4 °F or −8.1 °C being 16.2 °F or 9.0 °C warmer than the 1925 to 1974 average of 1.2 °F or −17.1 °C and 1.8 °F or 1.0 °C warmer than Alaska's previous record warmest January 1937.

=== February ===
- February 4
  - Fleetwood Mac's Grammy Award-winning album Rumours is released.
  - Eleven CTA commuters are killed when an elevated train derails from the Loop in central Chicago.
- February 12 – Actress Christa Helm is fatally stabbed on a sidewalk in West Hollywood. The perpetrator is never identified.
- February 18 – The Space Shuttle Enterprise test vehicle goes on its maiden "flight" while sitting on top of a Boeing 747, at Edwards Air Force Base in California.

=== March ===
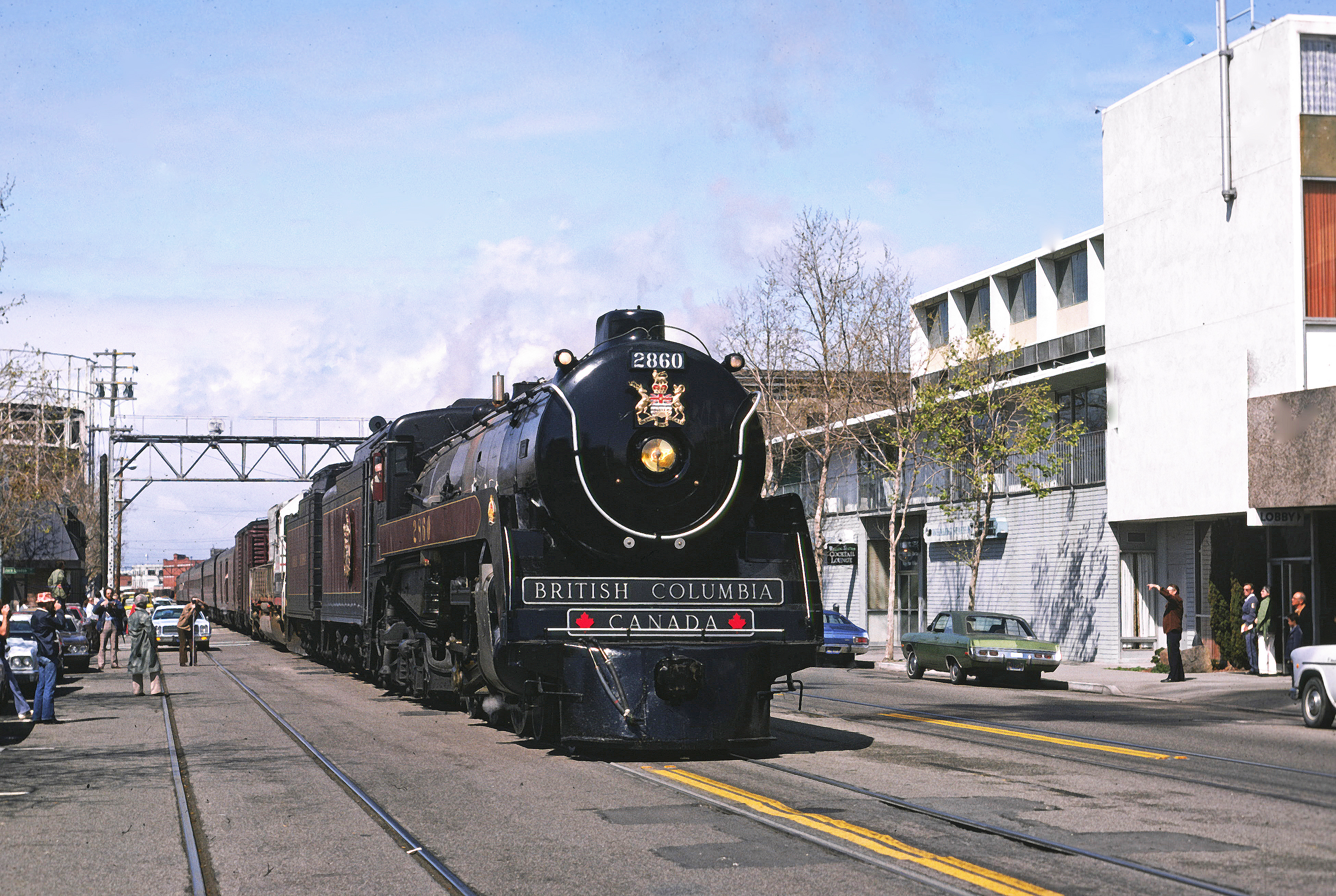
An excursion train pulled by a classic BC Rail steam locomotive visits Oakland, California in 1977

- March 9 – Approximately a dozen armed Hanafi Movement Muslims take over three buildings in Washington, D.C., killing one person and taking more than 130 hostages. The hostage situation ends two days later.
- March 11 – Walt Disney Productions' 22nd feature film, The Many Adventures of Winnie the Pooh, is released. It is the studio's most critically well-received film in years and the last in the Disney canon in which the late Walt Disney was involved with in any capacity.
- March 18 – United States lifts its ban on travel by U.S. citizens to Cambodia, Cuba, North Korea, and Vietnam.
- March 15 – Tenor Luciano Pavarotti and the PBS opera series Live from the Met both make their American television debuts. Pavarotti stars in a complete production of Puccini's La Boheme. Also debuting is the ABC sitcom Three's Company.
- March 26 – The fundamentalist organization Focus on the Family is founded by Dr. James Dobson.
- March 28 – The 49th Academy Awards ceremony, hosted by Richard Pryor, Ellen Burstyn, Jane Fonda and Warren Beatty, is held at Dorothy Chandler Pavilion in Los Angeles. John G. Avildsen's Rocky receives ten nominations, winning Best Picture and Best Director for Avildsen. Rocky is tied with Sidney Lumet's Network for the most nominations, while the latter film and Alan J. Pakula's All the President's Men both won four awards each. The late Peter Finch becomes the first posthumous actor Oscar winner, winning for Best Actor.

=== April ===
- April 4
  - Grundy, Virginia, experiences a major flood that causes around $15 million in damages to 228 residential and commercial structures.
  - Southern Airways Flight 242 during a flight leg en route to Atlanta, Georgia from Huntsville, Alabama, is forced to make an emergency landing on a highway after complete failure of the aircraft's two engines following the aircraft flying through a hailstorm. 63 of the 85 people on board and 9 people on the ground are killed in the accident.
- April 5 – Beginning of demonstrations in 10 cities across the U.S., the longest being the 3.5 week sit-in the San Francisco Federal Building to persuade President Jimmy Carter to implement the first Federal civil rights law for people with disabilities, Section 504 of the 1973 Rehabilitation Act, without reinstituting the "separate but equal" doctrine.
- April 7
  - The Toronto Blue Jays play their first game of baseball against the Chicago White Sox.
  - The Seattle Mariners play their first-ever game of baseball against the California Angels.
- April 21 – Residents of Dover, Massachusetts, report sightings of the so-called "Dover Demon".

=== May ===
- May 4 – The United States Conference of Catholic Bishops rule that divorced Catholics, including those who remarried outside the Church, are no longer automatically excommunicated and can still attend Mass but if they remarry without obtaining a Church annulment, cannot receive Holy Communion and confession.
- May 8 – Suzanne Lacy's extended performance piece about rape, Three Weeks in May begins in Los Angeles and continues until May 24.
- May 14 – The Montreal Canadiens sweep the Boston Bruins in four games to win their second straight Stanley Cup.
- May 16 – A 20-passenger S-61L helicopter topples sideways at takeoff from the roof of the Pan Am Building in Midtown Manhattan. Four passengers are killed by the turning rotors and a woman at street level is fatally struck by a fallen blade.
- May 17 – Chuck E. Cheese's Pizza Time Theatre first opens in San Jose, California.
- May 25 – The movie Star Wars, directed by George Lucas is released as the first film in the Star Wars Saga and the first in the Original Trilogy. It is premiered in 32 movie theaters across the United States before reaching other cinemas nationwide. Critics who had previewed the film gave it good reviews, with Time magazine dubbing it "the year's best movie". Star Wars would go on to break the record for highest-grossing film (surpassing Jaws, The Godfather and The Sound of Music)
- May 26 – George Willig climbs the South Tower of the World Trade Center.
- May 27 – Space Mountain opens at Disneyland and will become one of the park's most popular attractions.
- May 28 – The Beverly Hills Supper Club in Southgate, Kentucky is engulfed in fire, killing 165 inside.
- May 29 – Indianapolis 500: A. J. Foyt becomes the first driver (to date) to win a record four times.

=== June ===
- June 4–5 – Humboldt Park riot in Chicago.
- June 5 – The Portland Trail Blazers defeat the Philadelphia 76ers 109–107 to win the NBA finals 4–2. Bill Walton is named series MVP.
- June 7 – After campaigning by Anita Bryant and her anti-gay "Save Our Children" crusade, Miami-Dade County, Florida voters overwhelmingly vote to repeal the county's gay rights ordinance.
- June 10
  - Apple II computers go on sale.
  - Assassin James Earl Ray escapes from Brushy Mountain State Penitentiary in Petros, Tennessee. He is recaptured on June 13.
- June 16 – Oracle Corporation is incorporated in Redwood Shores, California, as Software Development Laboratories (SDL) by Larry Ellison, Bob Miner and Ed Oates.
- June 20 – The Supreme Court of the United States rules that states are not required to spend Medicaid funds on elective abortions.
- June 22 – Walt Disney Productions' 23rd feature film, The Rescuers, is released to box office success and positive critical reception.
- June 25 – American Roy Sullivan is struck by lightning for the 7th time.
- June 26
  - Some 200,000 protesters march through the streets of San Francisco, protesting Anita Bryant's anti-gay remarks and the murder of Robert Hillsborough.
  - Elvis Presley performs his final concert, in the Market Square Arena at Indianapolis, Indiana. Two previous performances were filmed in Omaha, Nebraska (June 19th), and Rapid City, South Dakota (June 21st), for the TV Special "Elvis In Concert." This special was not televised until October 3 of that year on CBS.
- June 30 – Women Marines disbanded; women are integrated into regular Marine Corps.

=== July ===
- July 13 – The New York City blackout of 1977 lasts for 25 hours, resulting in looting and disorder.
- July 19–20 – Flooding in Johnstown, Pennsylvania, caused by massive rainfall, kills over 75 people and causes billions of dollars in damage.
- July 24 – Led Zeppelin plays their last U.S. concert in Oakland, California at the Oakland-Alameda County Coliseum. A brawl erupts between Led Zeppelin's crew and promoter Bill Graham's staff, resulting in criminal assault charges for several of Led Zeppelin's entourage including drummer John Bonham.
- July 28 – The first oil through the Trans-Alaska Pipeline System reaches Valdez, Alaska.

=== August ===
- August 3 – United States Senate hearings on MKULTRA are held.
- August 4 – President Jimmy Carter signs legislation creating the United States Department of Energy.
- August 9 – Hulk Hogan debuts as The Super Destroyer for Championship Wrestling from Florida when he is defeated by Don Serrano at John Carroll Catholic High School's gym in Fort Pierce, Florida
- August 10 – David Berkowitz is captured in Yonkers, New York, after over a year of murders in New York City as the Son of Sam.
- August 12 – The NASA Space Shuttle, named Enterprise, makes its first test free-flight from the back of a Boeing 747 Shuttle Carrier Aircraft (SCA).
- August 15 – The Big Ear, a radio telescope operated by Ohio State University as part of the SETI project, receives a radio signal from deep space; the event is named the "WOW!" signal for a notation made by a volunteer on the project.
- August 16 – Elvis Presley, the king of rock and roll, dies in his home in Graceland at age 42. 75,000 fans lined the streets of Memphis for his funeral, which occurred on August 18, but wasn't televised until August 20.
- August 20 – Voyager program: The United States launches the Voyager 2 spacecraft.
- August 25 – Radio Shack’s new TRS-80 Micro Computer System uses a computer keyboard to plug into an included 64 column video monitor, programmed by cassette tapes played on a home cassette player, shown at the Boston Computer Show on August 25, 1977. From left, visitors Robert Lundgren of Des Plaines, Illinois, Malcolm MacLeod of Montreal, and Radio Shack salesman Steven Carlozzi of Brockton, Massachusetts

=== September ===
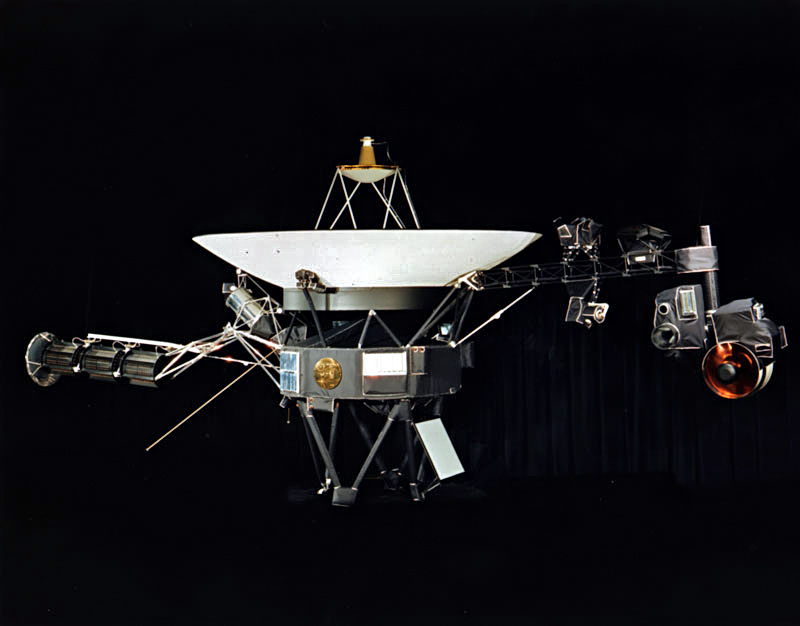
Voyager 1 launched Sept. 5, 1977

- September – Evangelical pastor Oral Roberts publishes plans to build the 'City of God Hospital' in Tulsa, Oklahoma. The towers are completed in 1981 for $120m ($299m, in 2012)
- September 4 – The Golden Dragon Massacre takes place in San Francisco, California.
- September 5 – Voyager program: Voyager 1 is launched after a brief delay.
- September 7 – Treaties between Panama and the United States on the status of the Panama Canal are signed. The U.S. agrees to transfer control of the canal to Panama at the end of the 20th century.
- September 13 – Soap debuts on ABC and launches the career of Billy Crystal.
- September 18 – Courageous, skippered by Ted Turner, sweeps Australia in the 24th America's Cup yachting race.
- September 19 – Nicaraguan drug cartels rise to power in New Jersey. Pablo Escobar as facilitating drug lord.
  - Under pressure from the Carter administration, President Anastasio Somoza Debayle lifts the state of siege in Nicaragua.
  - Closure of steelworks in Youngstown, Ohio, is announced.
- September 21 – A nuclear non-proliferation pact is signed by 15 countries, including the United States and the Soviet Union.
- September 23 – Jazz-rock group Steely Dan releases their sixth studio album Aja; it becomes their highest charting album at No. 3 and goes on to win a Grammy Award.
- September 29
  - Singer-songwriter Billy Joel releases his fifth studio album The Stranger; it becomes the first of several hit albums, spawning five hit singles, going 10× platinum in the US, and later ranking at No. 70 on the list of Rolling Stone's 500 Greatest Albums of All Time.
  - The modern Food Stamp Program begins when the Food Stamp Act of 1977 is enacted.
- September 30 – A series of partial government shutdowns occur, finally ending in December.

=== October ===
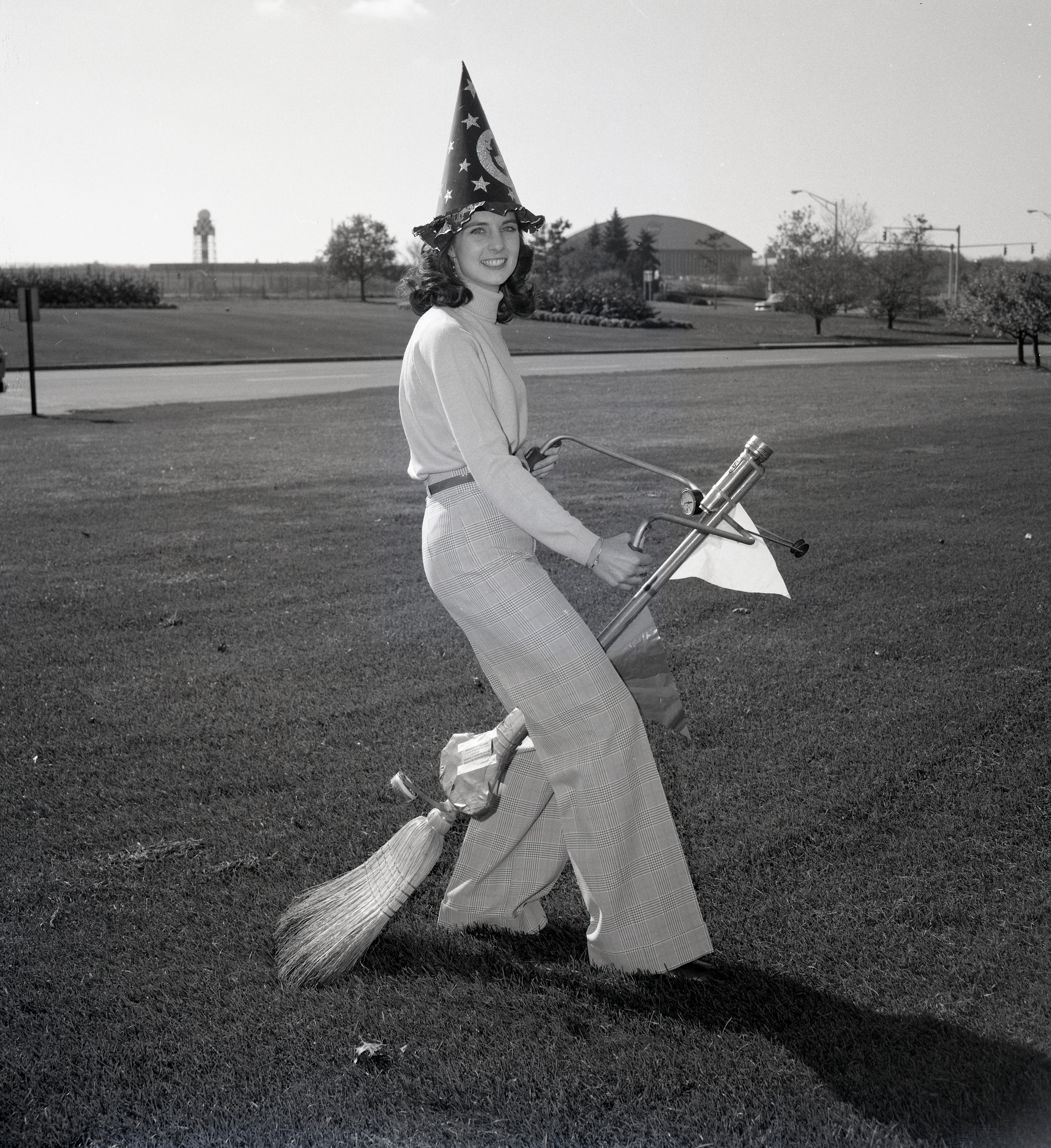
Halloween at NASA's Glenn Research Center, Cleveland, Ohio, 1977

- October 1
  - Energy Research and Development Administration part of Department of Energy.
  - Pelé plays his final professional football game as a member of the New York Cosmos.
- October 6 – Irish American mobster Danny Greene is murdered with a car bomb by the Cleveland crime family in Lyndhurst, Ohio.
- October 12 – The passage of the Community Reinvestment Act.
- October 14 – Anita Bryant is famously pied by four gay rights activists during a press conference in Des Moines, Iowa. This event resulted in her political fallout from anti-gay activism.
- October 18 – Newly acquired and flamboyantly charismatic slugger Reggie Jackson hits three home runs to lead the New York Yankees to their first World Series championship victory since 1962 over the Los Angeles Dodgers in the 1977 World Series in six games.
- October 20 – Three members (lead singer Ronnie Van Zant, guitarist Steve Gaines and his older sister Cassie Gaines, band's backup singer) of the Southern rock band Lynyrd Skynyrd die in a charter plane crash outside Gillsburg, Mississippi, three days after the release of their fifth studio album Street Survivors.
- October 21 – Rock singer Meat Loaf (real name Marvin Lee Aday) releases the album Bat Out of Hell.
- October 24 – A new Peanuts special, It's Your First Kiss, Charlie Brown, airs on CBS. It shows and names "Heather", the Little Red-Haired Girl, thereupon ending the 'mystery'.

=== November ===
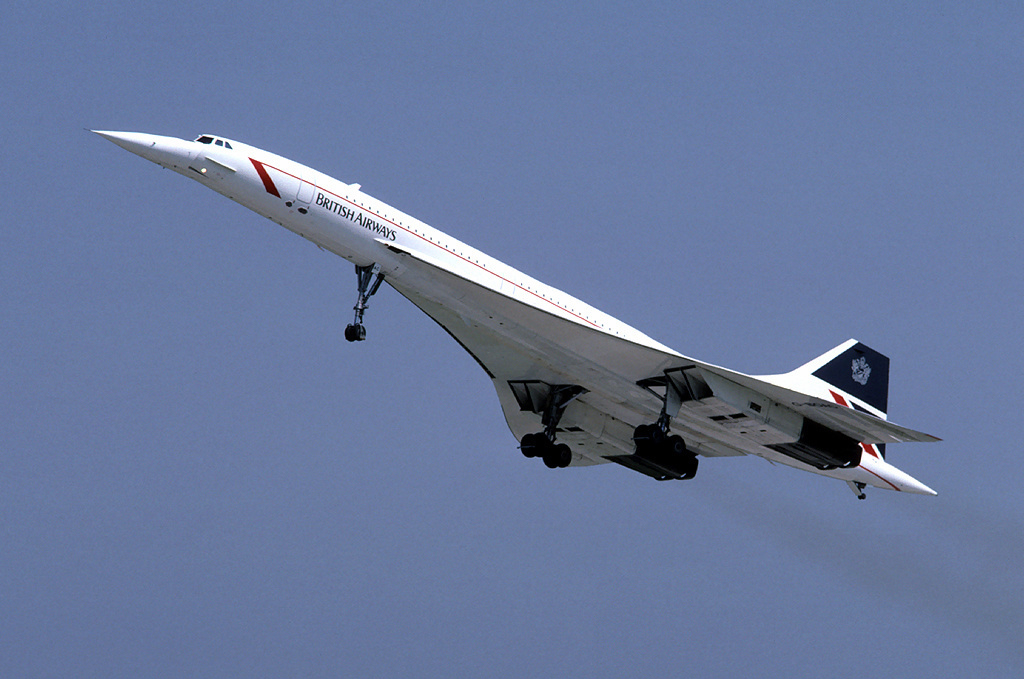
A British Airways Concorde aircraft

- November 6 – The Kelly Barnes Dam, located above Toccoa Falls Bible College near Toccoa, Georgia, fails, killing 39.
- November 8 – San Francisco elects City Supervisor Harvey Milk, the first openly gay elected official of any large city in the U.S.
- November 13 – The comic strip Li'l Abner ends its 43-year run in newspapers.
- November 22 – British Airways inaugurates regular London to New York City supersonic Concorde service.
- November 27 – The Rankin/Bass animated film The Hobbit premieres on NBC in the United States.
- November 28 – Jazz saxophonist Archie Shepp records "On Green Dolphin Street", the first digitally recorded album to be released commercially in the USA.

=== December ===
- December 1 – Pinwheel debuts on Channel C-3 (now Nickelodeon).
- December 11 – After losing 26 games, the Tampa Bay Buccaneers of the US National Football League record their very first win; against the New Orleans Saints.
- December 12 – The Lockheed's top-secret stealth aircraft project, designated Have Blue, precursor to the U.S. F-117A Nighthawk, makes its first flight.
- December 13 – Crash of Air Indiana Flight 216: A DC-3 charter plane carrying the University of Evansville basketball team crashes in rain and dense fog about 90 seconds after takeoff from Evansville Dress Regional Airport. Twenty-nine people die in the crash, including 14 members of the team and head coach Bob Watson.
- December 16 – Mikhail Baryshnikov's 1976 production of Tchaikovsky's ballet The Nutcracker comes to CBS a year after premiering onstage at the Kennedy Center. This adaptation will become the most popular television production of the work.
- December 19–21 – The Great Bakersfield Dust Storm hits the Southern San Joaquin Valley, in California; resulting in three deaths and $40 million in damages.

=== Undated ===
- Polish-American mathematician Antoni Zygmund authors his major work Measure and Integral.
- Feature films released in 1977 include: Star Wars, Annie Hall, Saturday Night Fever, Close Encounters of the Third Kind, The Goodbye Girl, A Bridge Too Far, Exorcist II: The Heretic, The Turning Point, New York, New York, Smokey and the Bandit
- John Travolta's role in Saturday Night Fever inspired young Americans to wear Flare jeans, an updated version of Bell-bottoms.
- Atari 2600, released in October, popularized the use of microprocessor based hardware and cartridges containing game code.
- The coldest winter for fifty-nine years in the Ohio Valley region and a record dry year throughout the West, especially the Pacific Northwest, creates heating fuel and water shortages plus extended freezing of the Great Lakes and freezing of the Mississippi River as far as Cairo, Illinois.

=== Ongoing ===
- Cold War (1947–1991)
- Détente (c. 1969–1979)
- 1970s energy crisis (1973–1980)

== Births ==
=== January ===
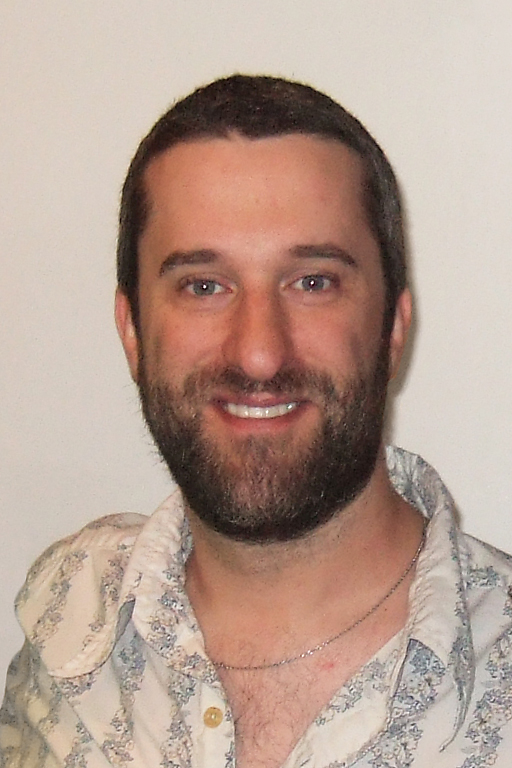
Dustin Diamond

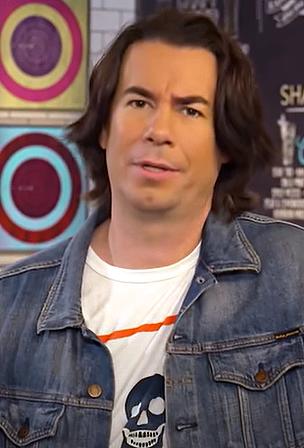
Jerry Trainor

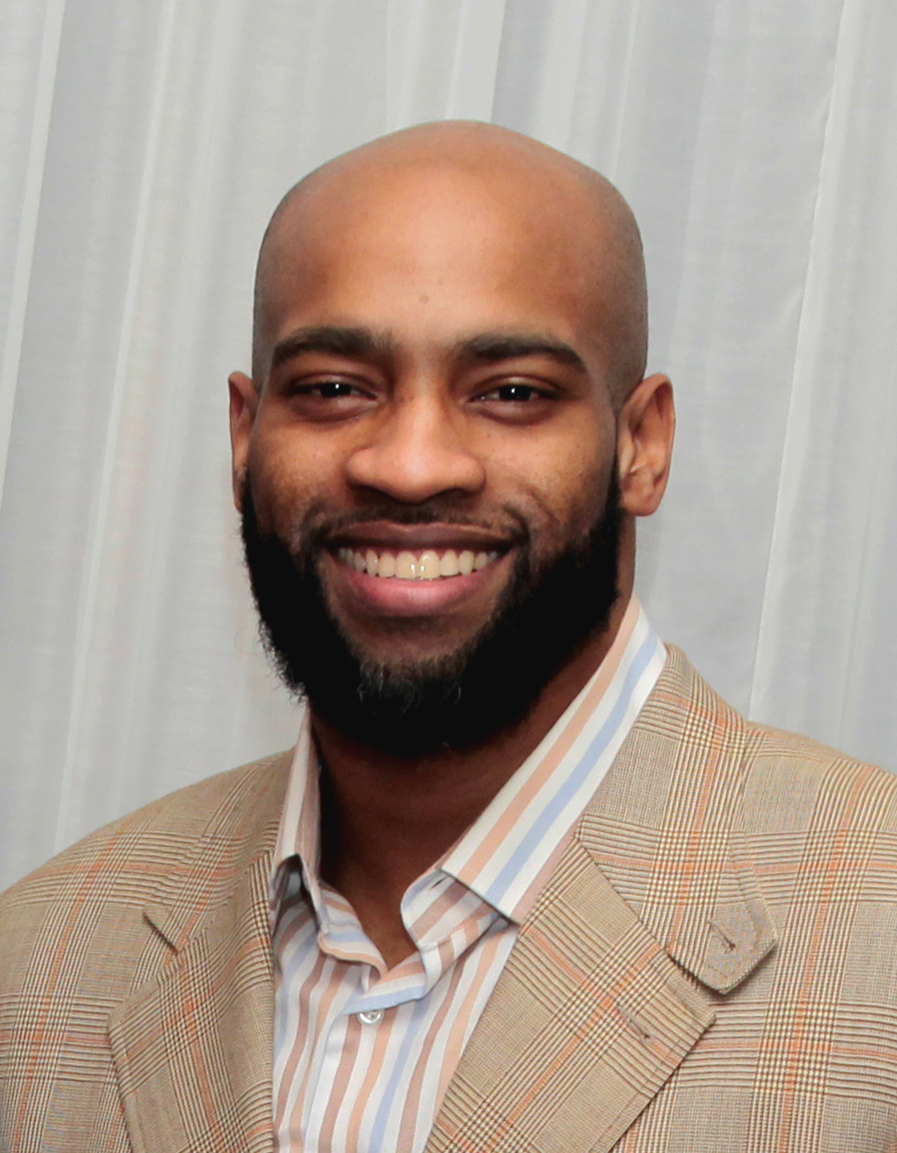
Vince Carter

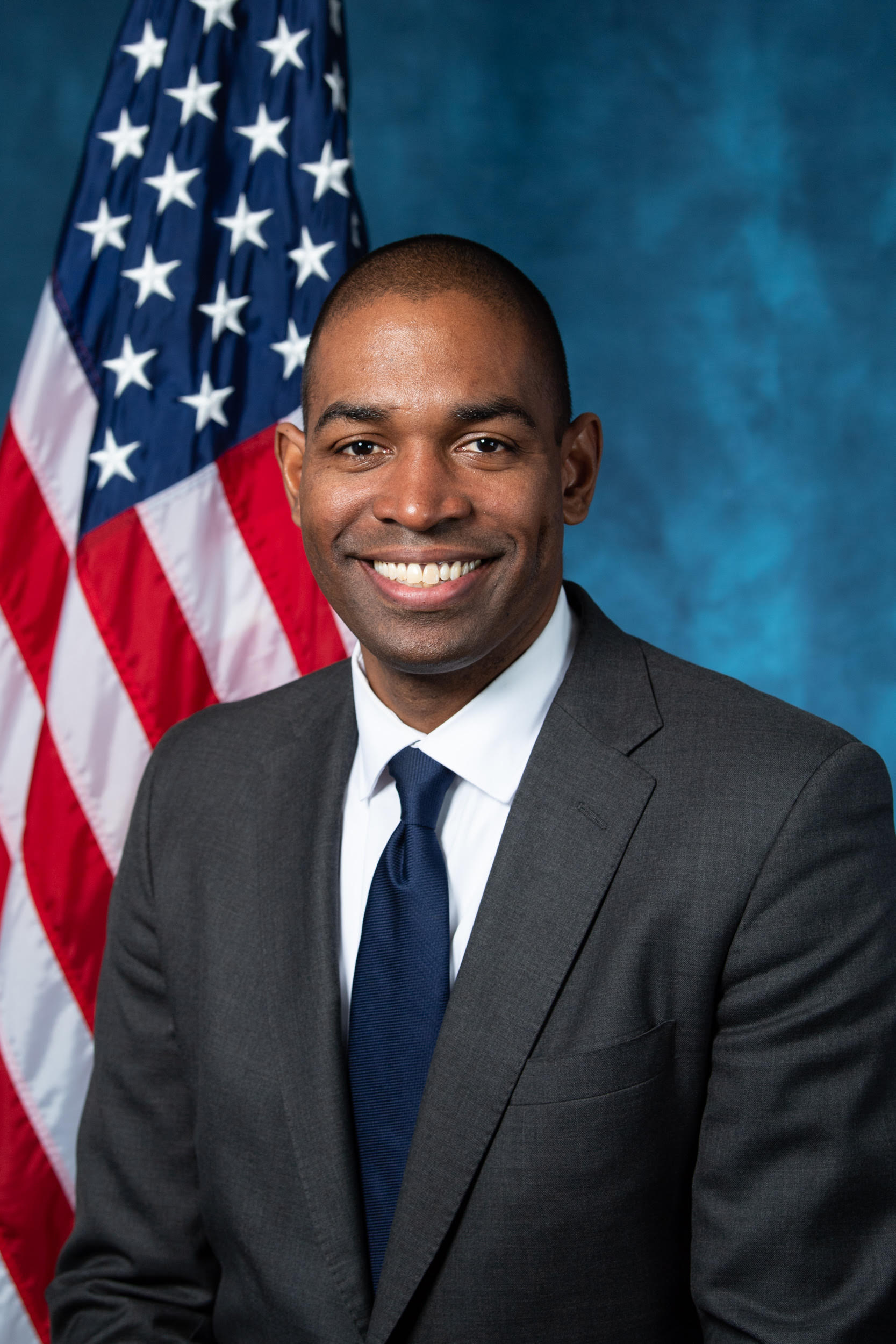
Antonio Delgado

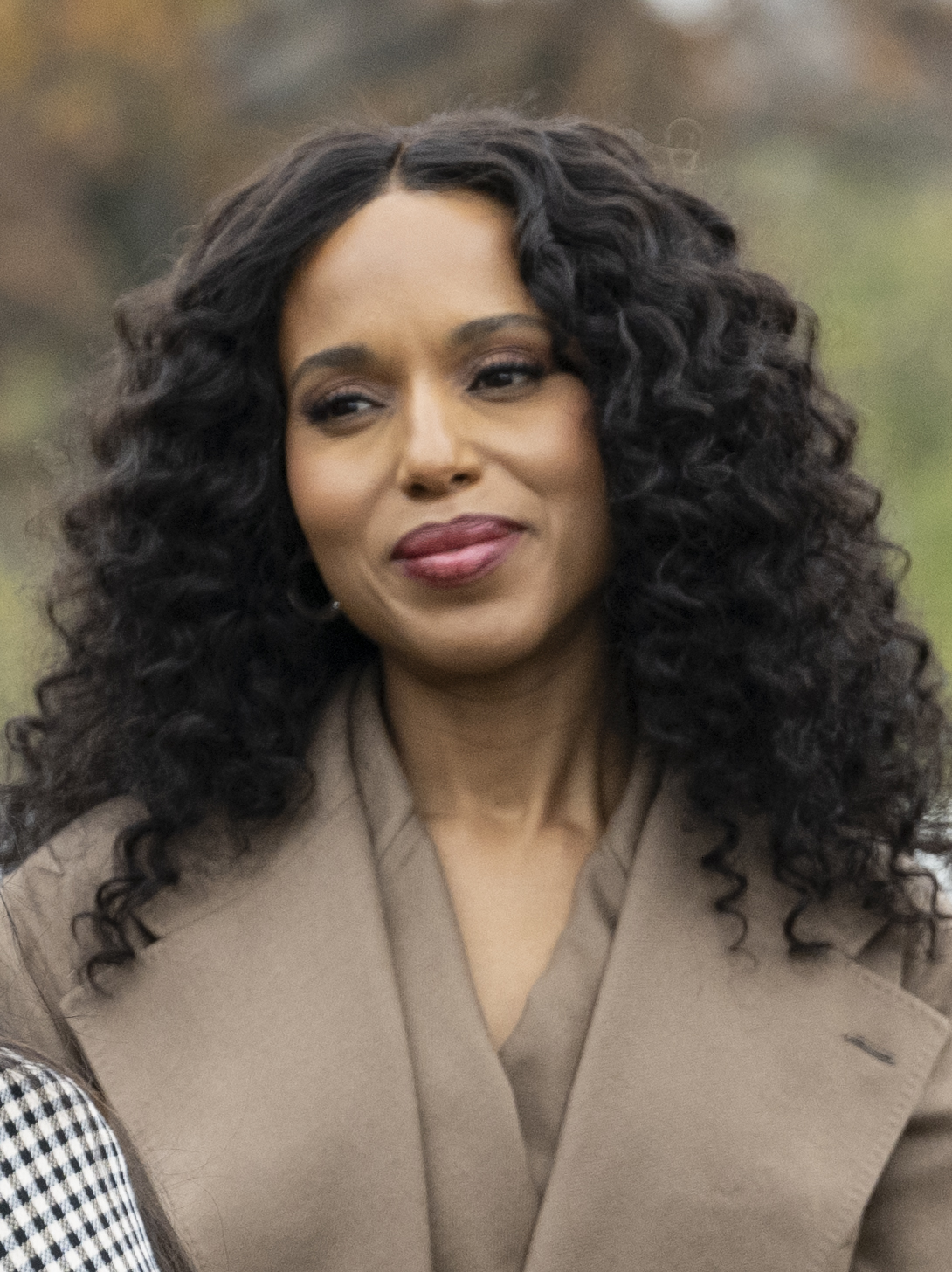
Kerry Washington

- January 1 – Abdihakem Abdirahman, Olympic long-distance runner
- January 3 – A. J. Burnett, baseball player
- January 4
  - Solon Bixler, musician and guitarist
  - Graham Elliot, chef, restaurateur and television personality
  - Ozell Wells, Dominican-American basketball player, coach, and scout
- January 7
  - Dustin Diamond, actor (d. 2021)
  - John Gidding, architect and television host
- January 8 – Amber Benson, actress
- January 9 – Scoonie Penn, basketball player
- January 10 – Clark Haggans, football player (d. 2023)
- January 11
  - Devin Ratray, actor
  - Nadia Turner, singer
- January 12
  - DeJuan Alfonzo, football player
  - DJ Paul, DJ, record producer, and rapper for Three 6 Mafia
- January 16 – Mark Simoneau, football player
- January 17 – Kevin Thorn, wrestler
- January 18
  - Lazo Alavanja, soccer player
  - Allison Alderson, actress, host, and beauty queen
  - EpicLLOYD, youtuber and rapper
- January 19
  - Rob Delaney, comedian
  - Taliesin Jaffe, actor
- January 20 – Sid Wilson, turntablist for Slipknot
- January 21
  - Reggie Austin, football player
  - Jerry Trainor, actor, comedian and musician
- January 24
  - Johann Urb, Estonian-born actor
  - Chad Hurley, webmaster and businessman, co-founder of YouTube
- January 26
  - Vince Carter, basketball player
  - Justin Gimelstob, tennis player and coach
- January 28
  - Daunte Culpepper, football player
  - Antonio Delgado, politician, 79th Lieutenant Governor of New York
  - Joey Fatone, singer and member of 'N Sync
  - Lyle Overbay, professional baseball player
- January 29
  - Dion Basco, actor
  - Justin Hartley, actor
  - Sam Jaeger, actor
  - Lateefah Simon, politician
- January 30
  - Dan Hinote, ice hockey player and coach
  - Dwight Johnson, football player
- January 31
  - Wheeler Antabanez, writer
  - Molly Line, news correspondent
  - Bobby Moynihan, actor and comedian
  - Kerry Washington, actress

=== February ===
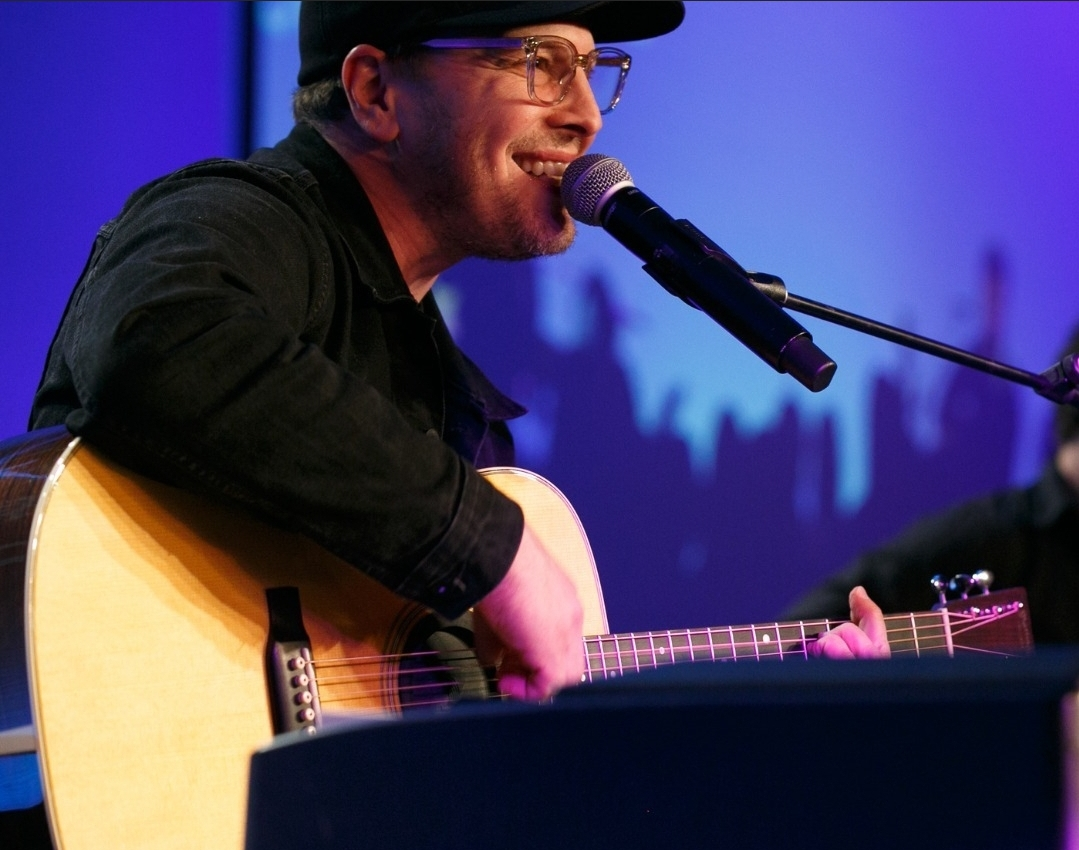
Gavin DeGraw

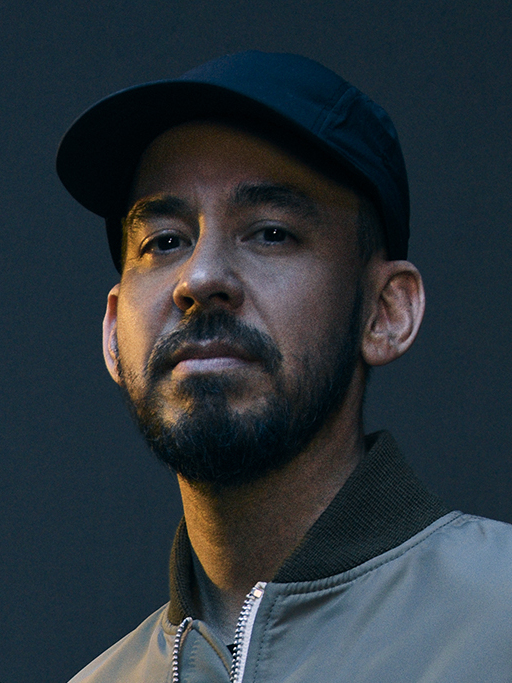
Mike Shinoda

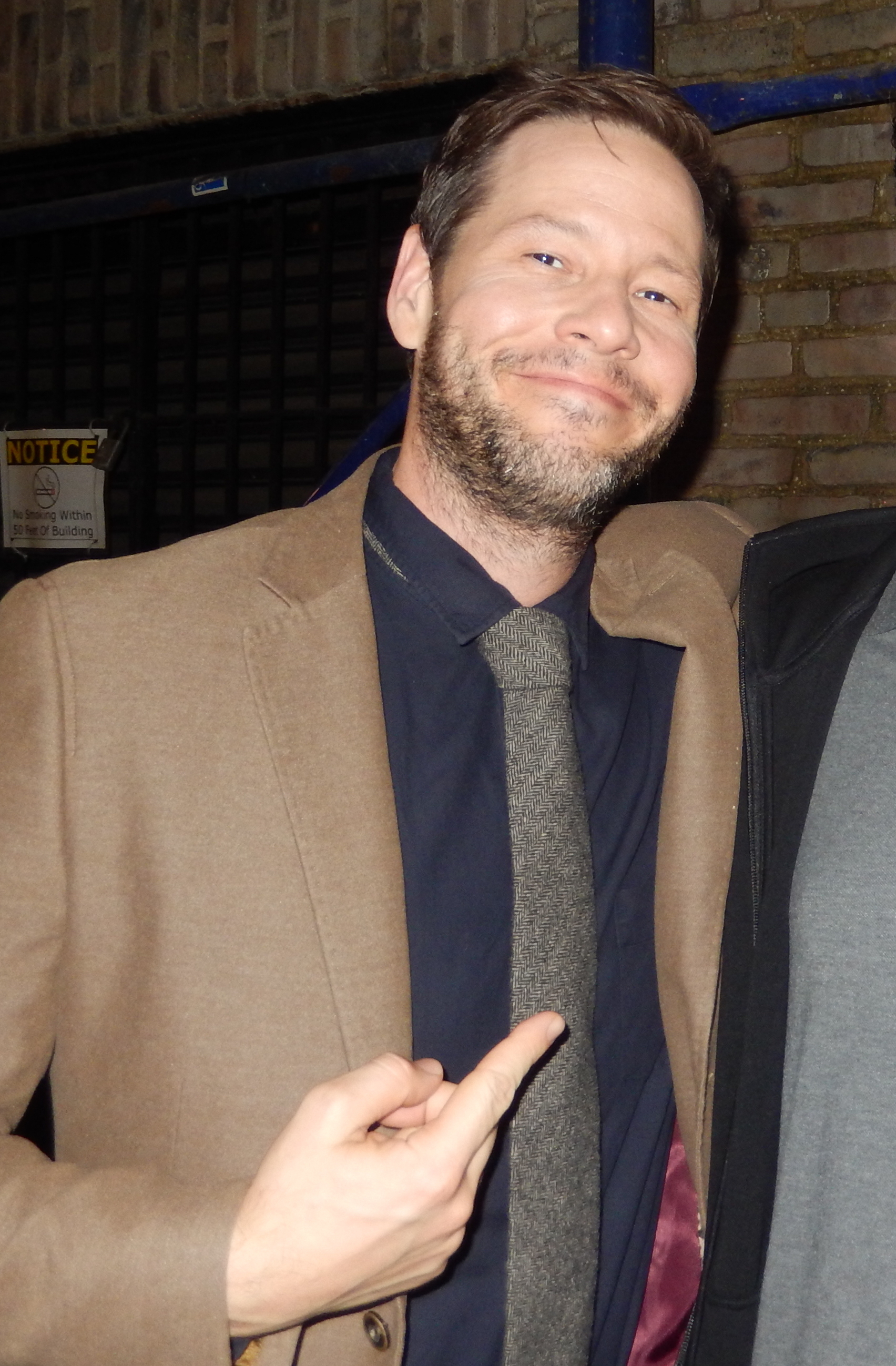
Ike Barinholtz

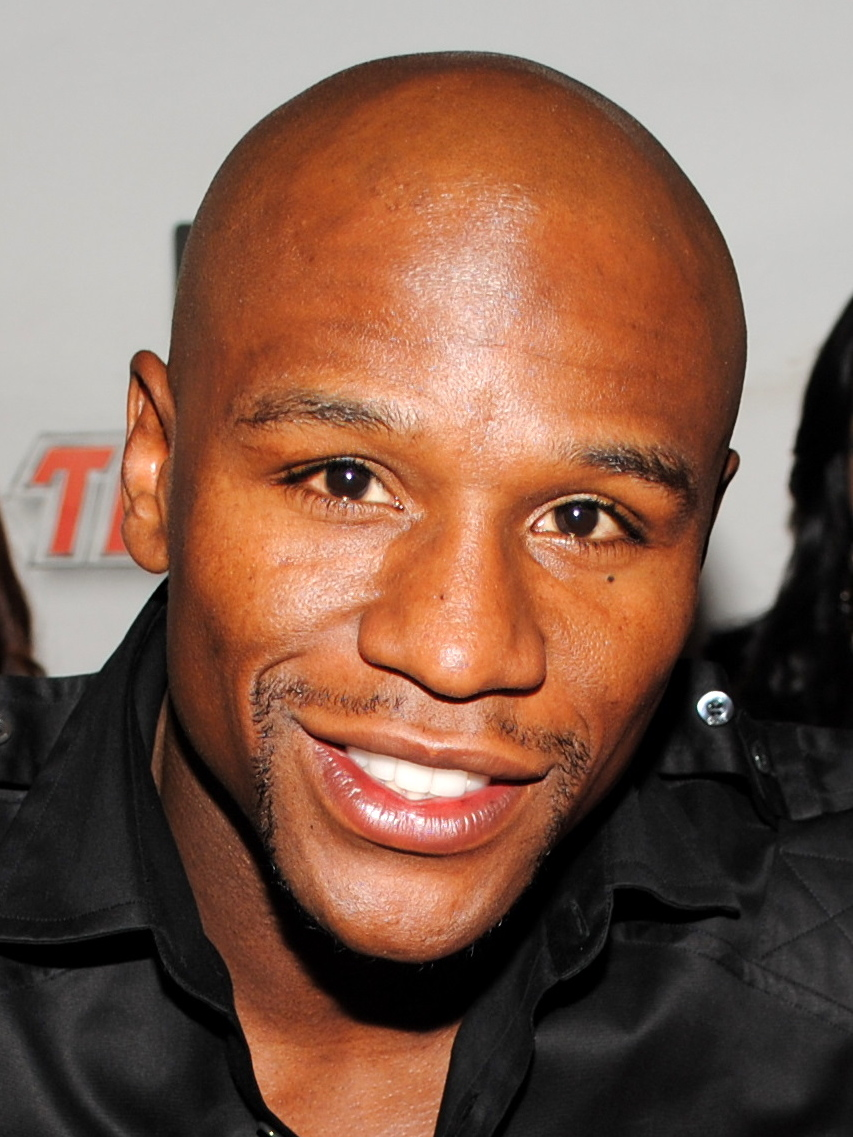
Floyd Mayweather Jr.

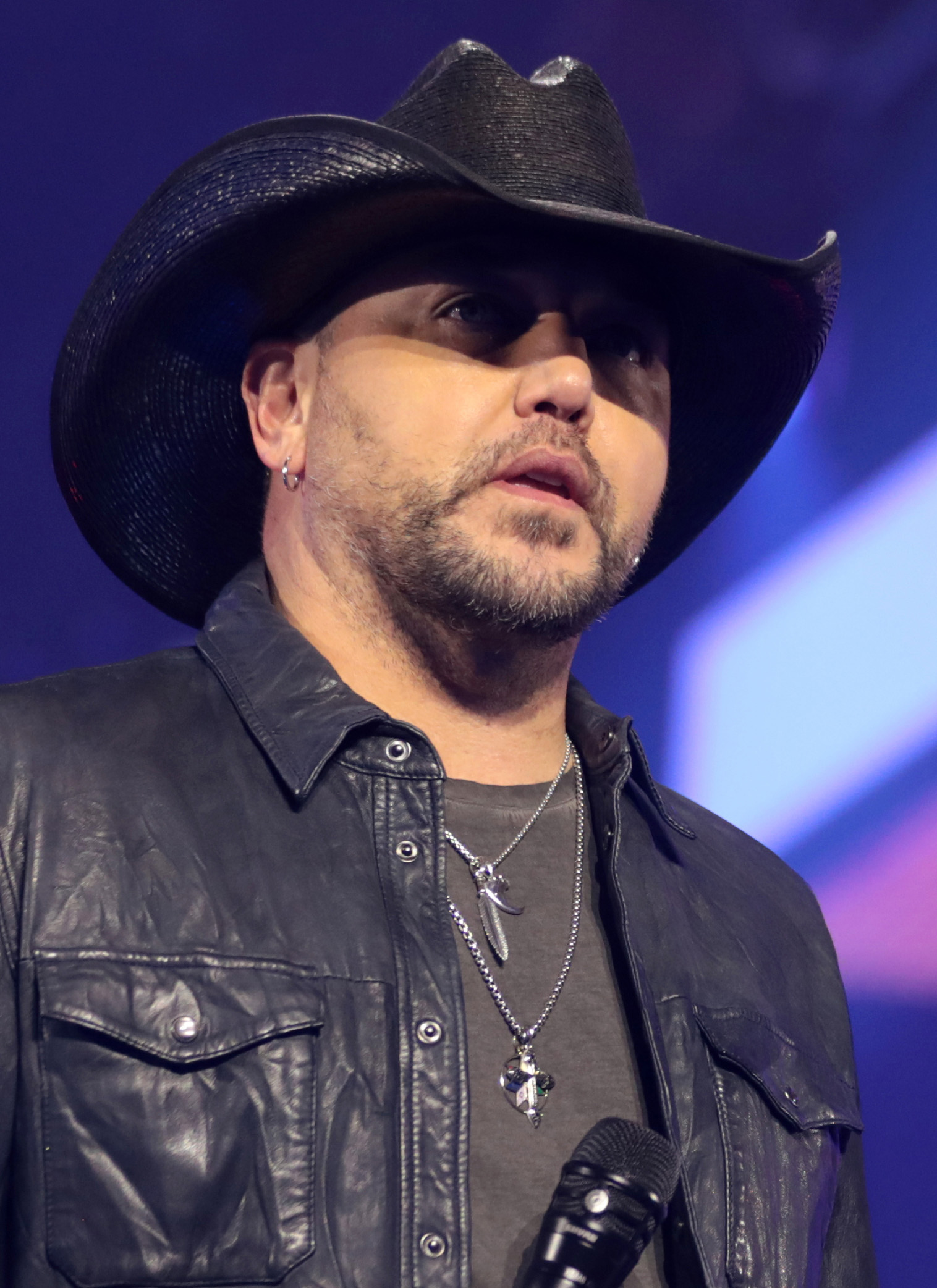
Jason Aldean

- February 1
  - Lari Ketner, basketball player (d. 2014)
  - Robert Traylor, basketball player (d. 2011)
- February 3 – Maitland Ward, actress
- February 4
  - Shedrack Anderson III, actor
  - Gavin DeGraw, musician and singer-songwriter
  - Daniel Lurie, politician and philanthropist, mayor of San Francisco (2025-present)
- February 5
  - Adam Everett, baseball player
  - Conrad Kennedy III, wrestler
  - Ahmad Merritt, football player
- February 6
  - Brendan Boyle, politician
  - Josh Stewart, actor
- February 7 – Hillary Wolf, child actress and judoka
- February 8
  - Dave Farrell, bassist for Linkin Park
  - Barry Hall, footballer
- February 10 – Kris Jordan, politician (d. 2023)
- February 11 – Mike Shinoda, singer, rapper, and emcee for Linkin Park
- February 12 – Melissa Beck, television personality and comedian
- February 13 – Randy Moss, football player
- February 15 – Brooks Wackerman, drummer for Avenged Sevenfold and Bad Religion (2001-2005)
- February 16 – Paul Brittain, actor and comedian
- February 17 – Bennie Anderson, football player
- February 18
  - Ike Barinholtz, actor and comedian
  - Kristoffer Polaha, actor and author
  - Sean Watkins, guitarist, vocalist and songwriter
- February 19 – Andrew Ross Sorkin, journalist, author, columnist, and producer
- February 20
  - Gail Kim, Canadian-born wrestler
  - Stephon Marbury, basketball player
- February 21
  - Jonathan Safran Foer, author
  - Steve Francis, basketball player
  - Kevin Rose, internet entrepreneur
- February 24
  - Julie E. Adams, politician
  - Bronson Arroyo, baseball player and singer
  - Floyd Mayweather Jr., boxer
- February 26
  - Jeremy Aldrich, soccer player
  - Greg Rikaart, actor
- February 28
  - Aaron Aguilera, wrestler and actor
  - Jason Aldean, country singer
  - Lance Archer, wrestler
  - Steven Fulop, politician, mayor of Jersey City, New Jersey

=== March ===
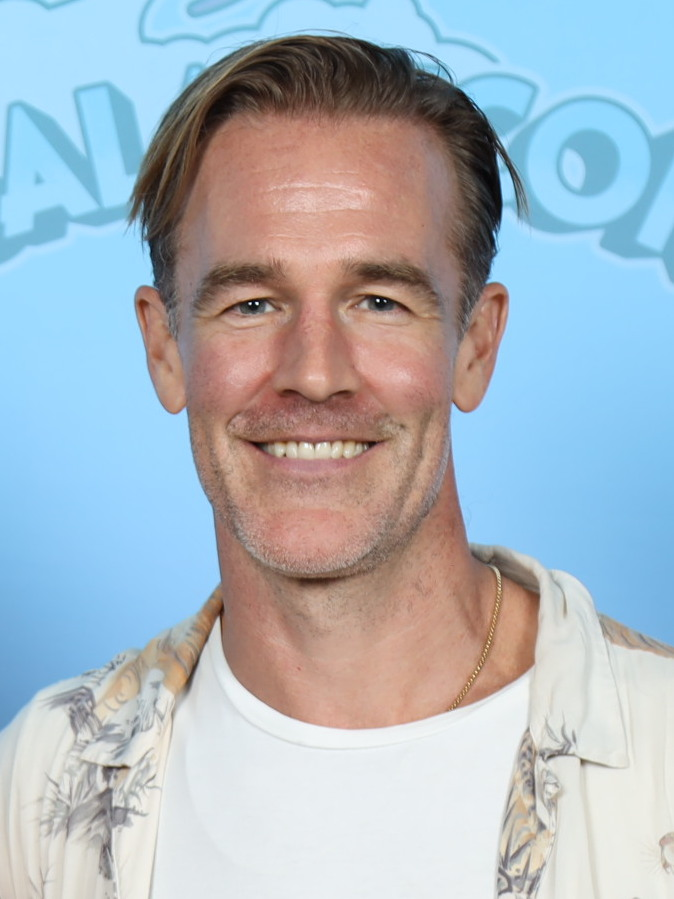
James Van Der Beek

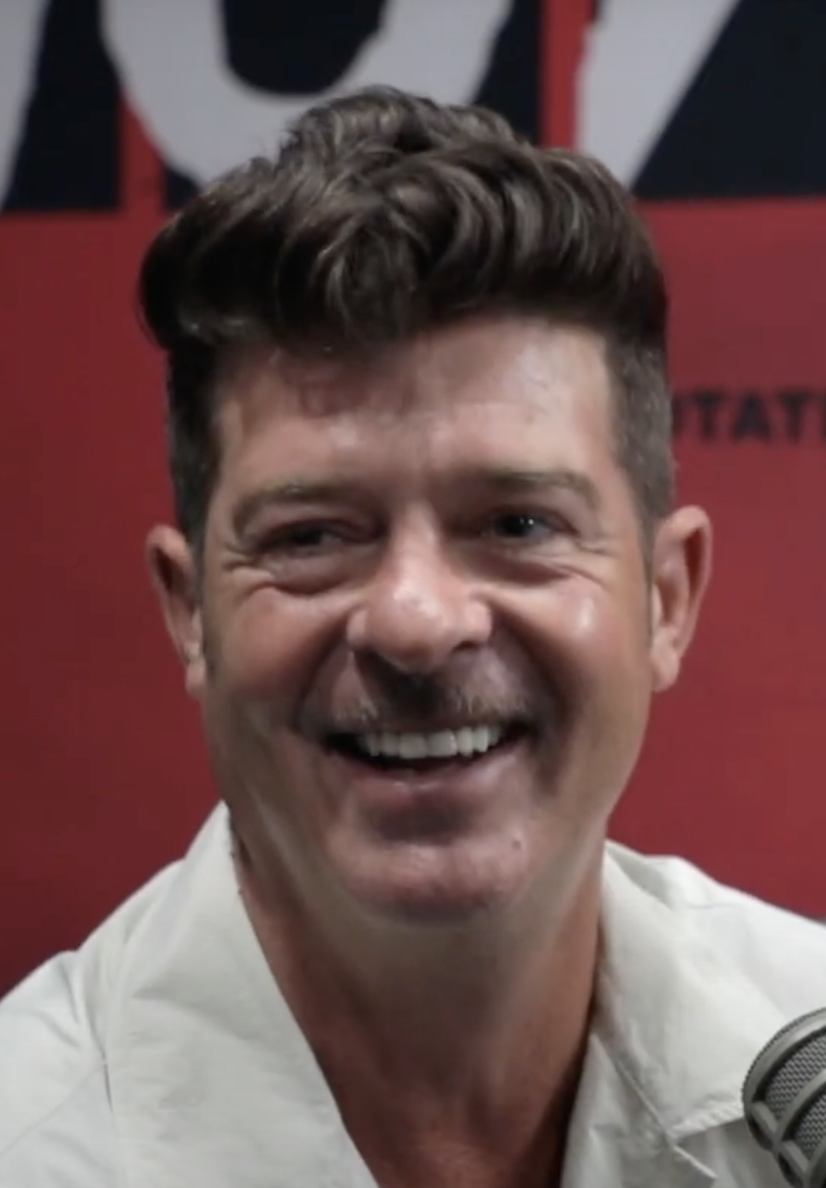
Robin Thicke

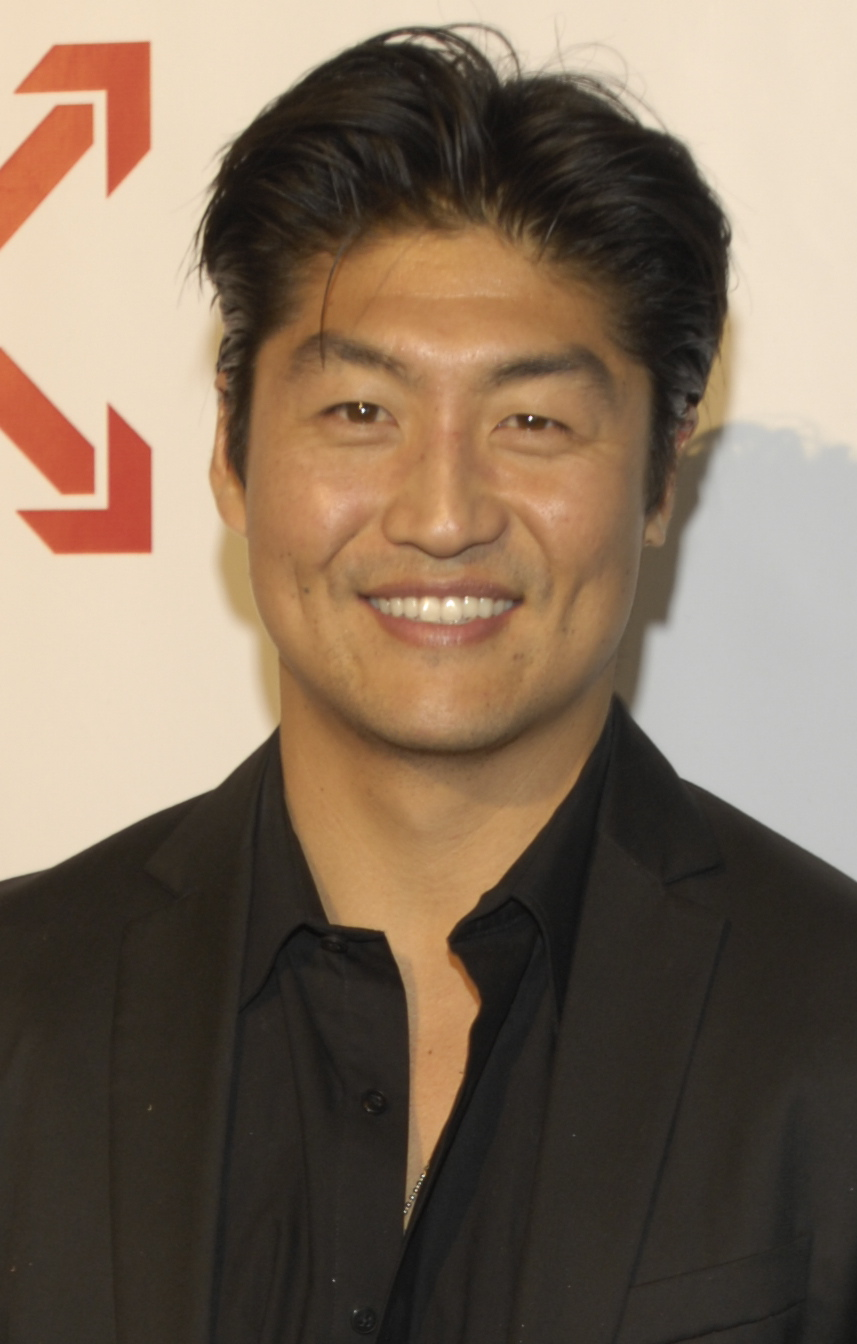
Brian Tee

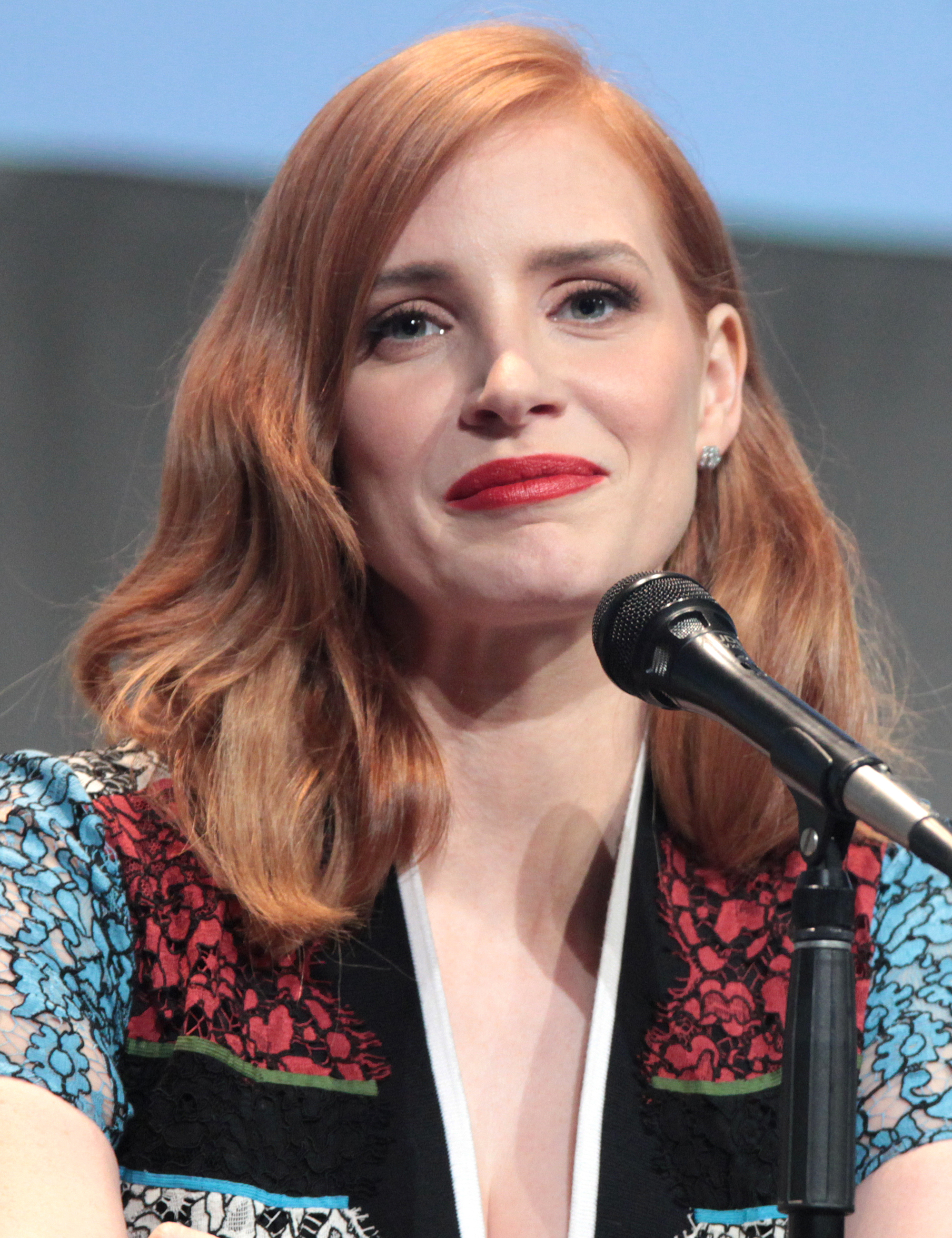
Jessica Chastain

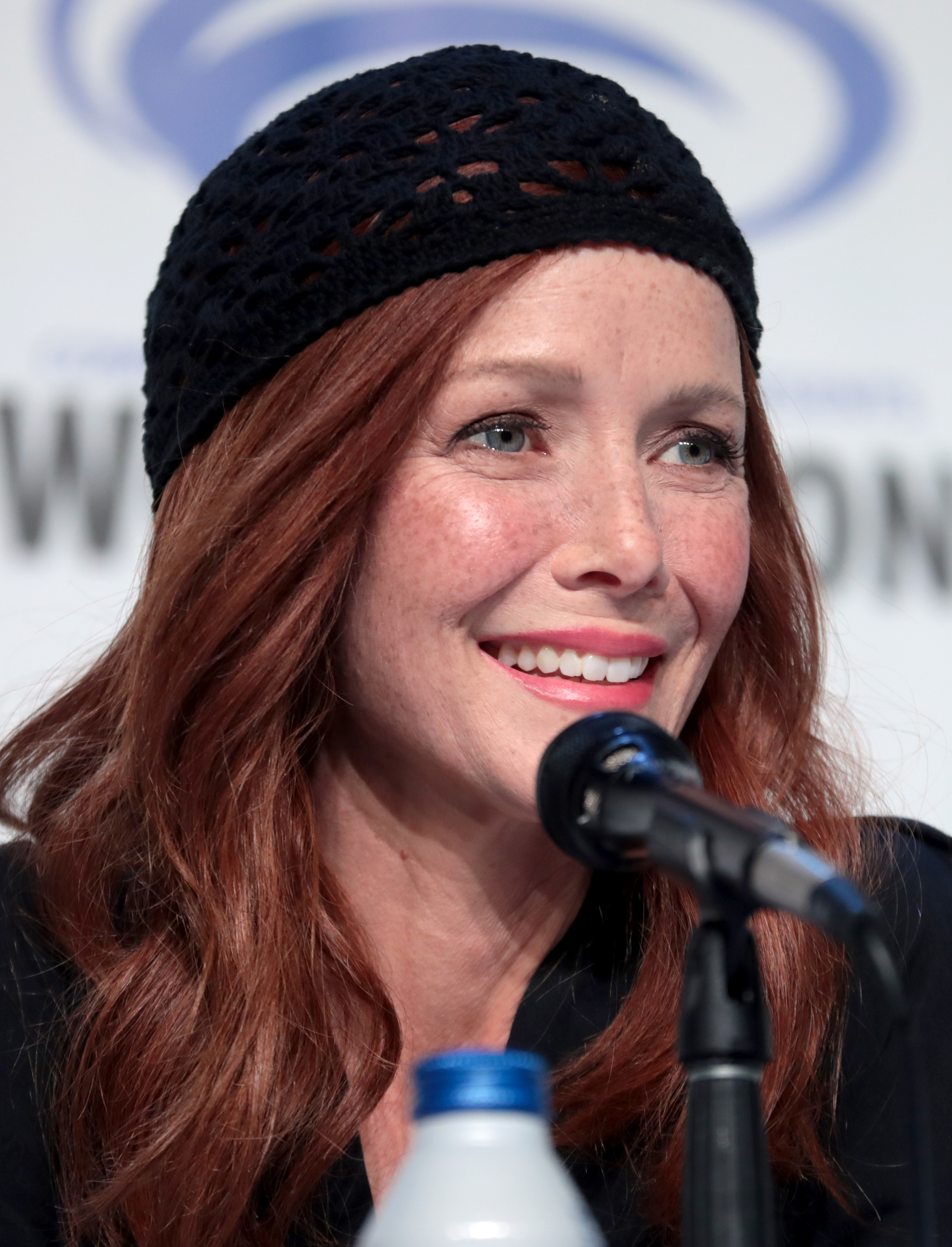
Annie Wersching

- March 1 – Adam Huss, actor, producer, and writer
- March 2
  - Steve Armas, soccer player
  - Heather McComb, actress
- March 4 – Jeremiah Green, rock musician drummer for Modest Mouse (d. 2022)
- March 5
  - Daniel Alarcón, Peruvian-born novelist, journalist, and radio producer
  - Jennifer Anson, American-born Palaun judoka
  - Bryan Berard, ice hockey player
  - Mike MacDougal, baseball player
  - Wally Szczerbiak, Spanish-born basketball player and sportscaster
- March 6 – Bubba Sparxxx, rapper
- March 8
  - Michael Tarver, wrestler
  - James Van Der Beek, actor (d. 2026)
- March 9
  - Lydia Mackay, actress
  - Shannon Miller, gymnast
- March 10
  - Robin Thicke, American-born Canadian singer
  - Bree Turner, actress
- March 11
  - Miguel Almaguer, journalist
  - Becky Hammon, basketball player
- March 15
  - Brandon DiCamillo, television personality, actor, stunt performer, filmmaker, and musician
  - Joe Hahn, musician, DJ, director and visual artist for Linkin Park
  - Brian Tee, Japanese-born actor
- March 16 – Richard Swift, singer/songwriter, multi-instrumentalist, producer and short-film maker
- March 17 – Tamar Braxton, singer
- March 18 – Devin Lima, singer and member of LFO (d. 2018)
- March 19
  - Ebon Moss-Bachrach, actor
  - Jorma Taccone, actor, comedian, writer, director, producer, and musician
- March 22
  - Joey Porter, football player and coach
  - Dave Portnoy, media personality
  - Tom Poti, ice hockey player
  - Lon Symensma, chef
- March 23 – Sammy Morris, football player
- March 24
  - Ubusuku Abukusumo, soccer player
  - Jessica Chastain, actress and producer
- March 26 – Bianca Kajlich, actress
- March 27 – Roger Velasco, actor
- March 28 – Annie Wersching, actress (d. 2023)
- March 29 – Sascha Radetsky, ballet dancer

=== April ===
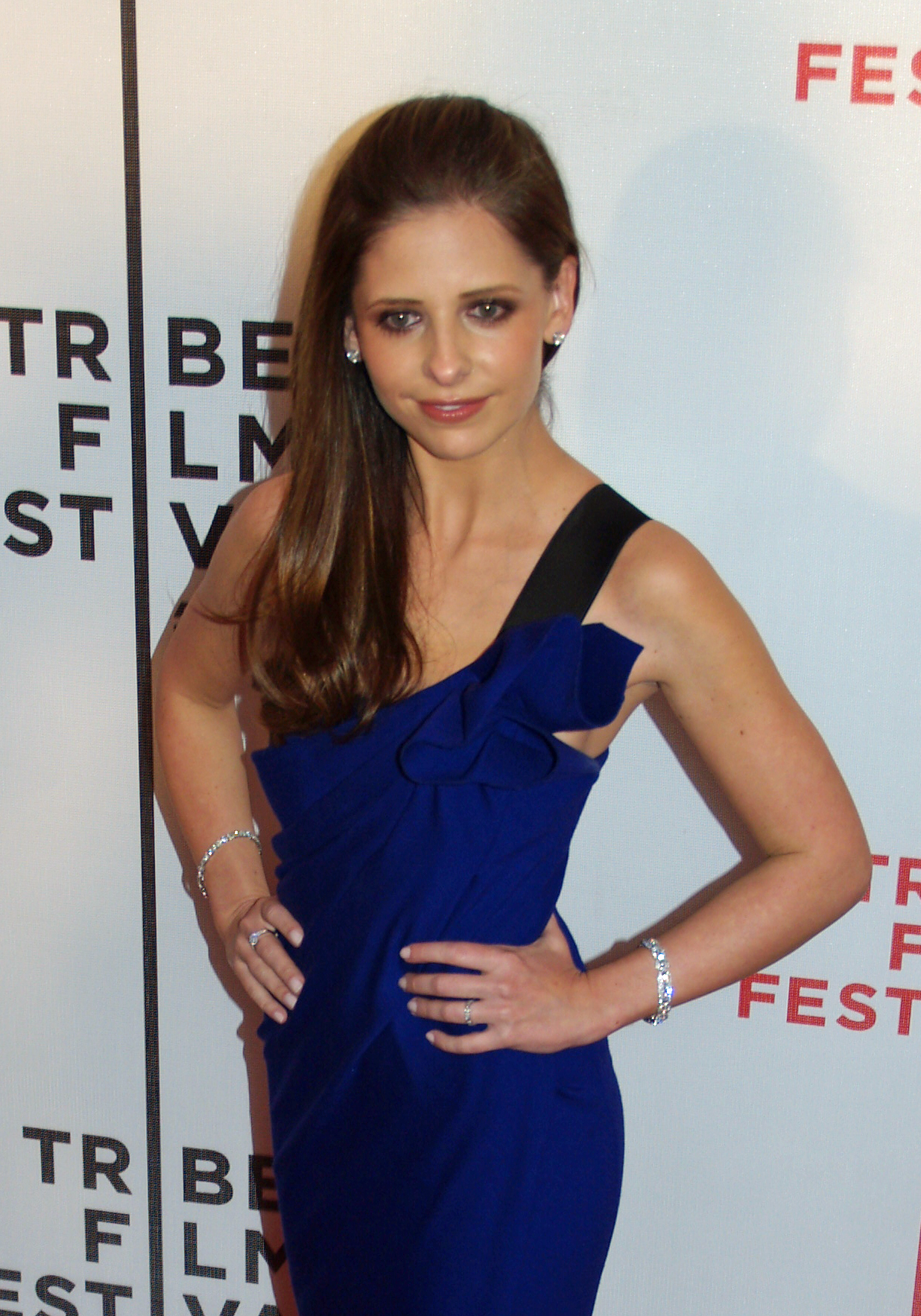
Sarah Michelle Gellar

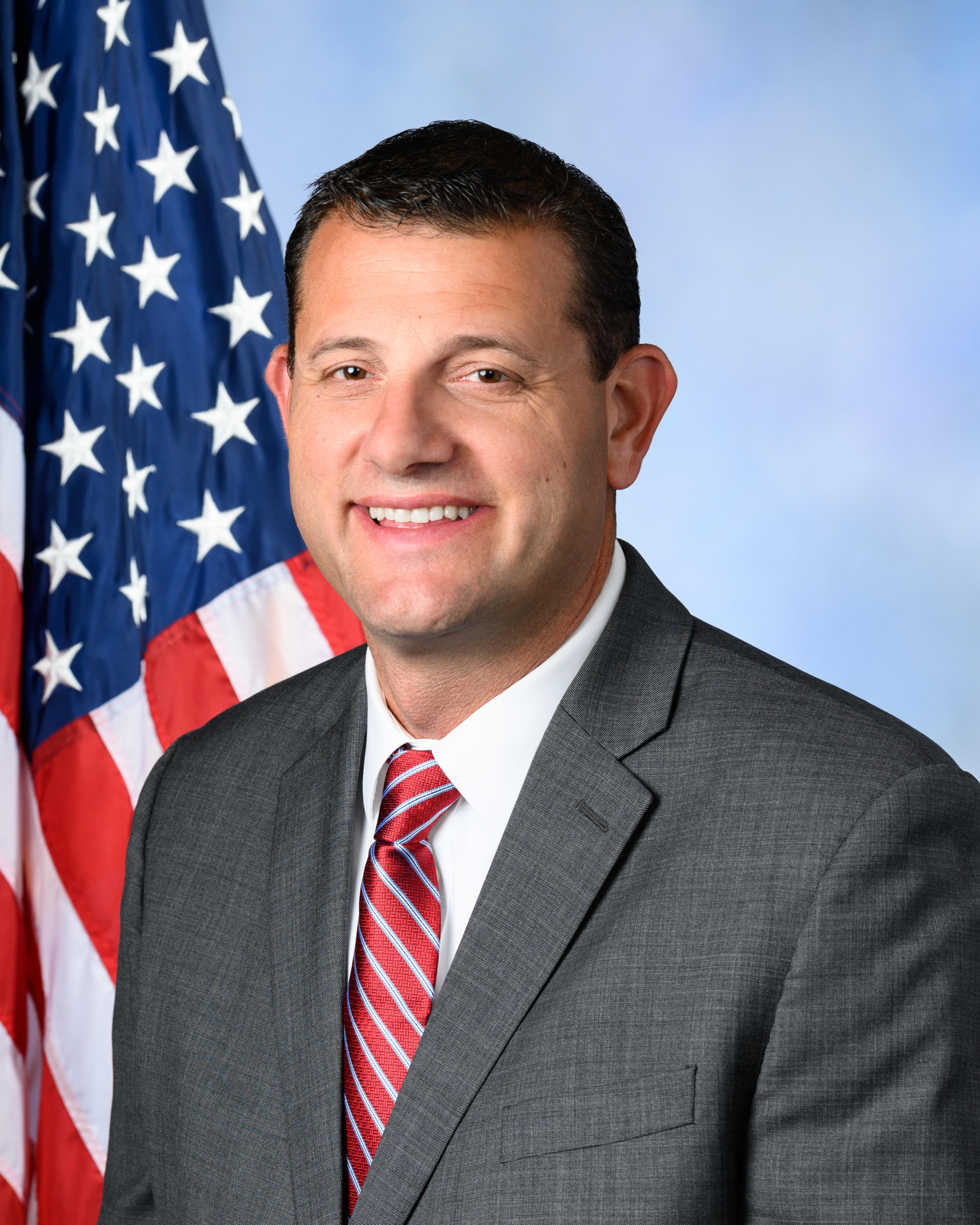
David Valadao

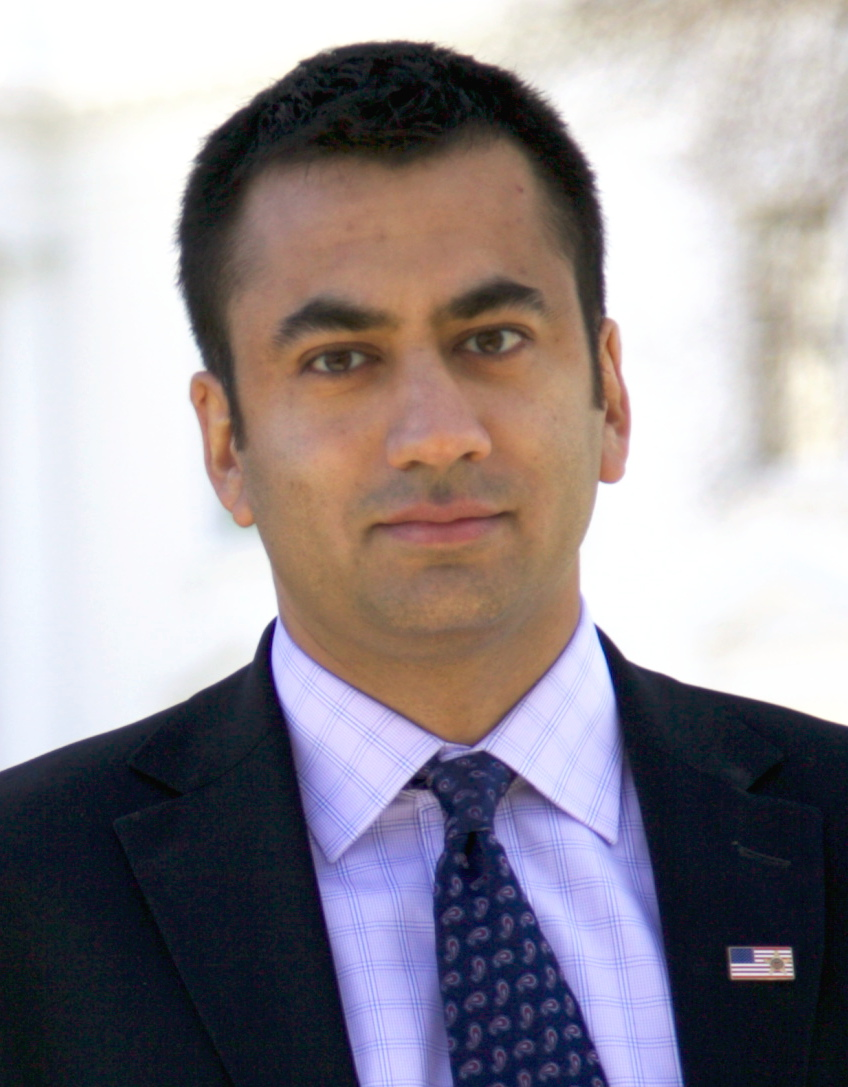
Kal Penn

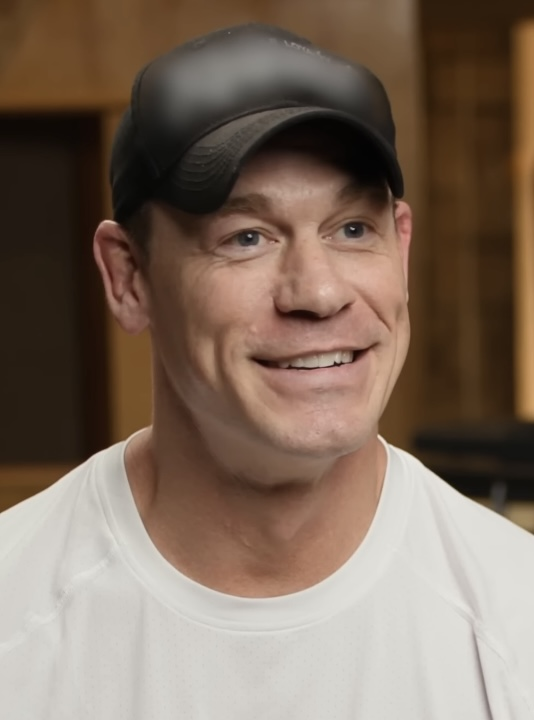
John Cena

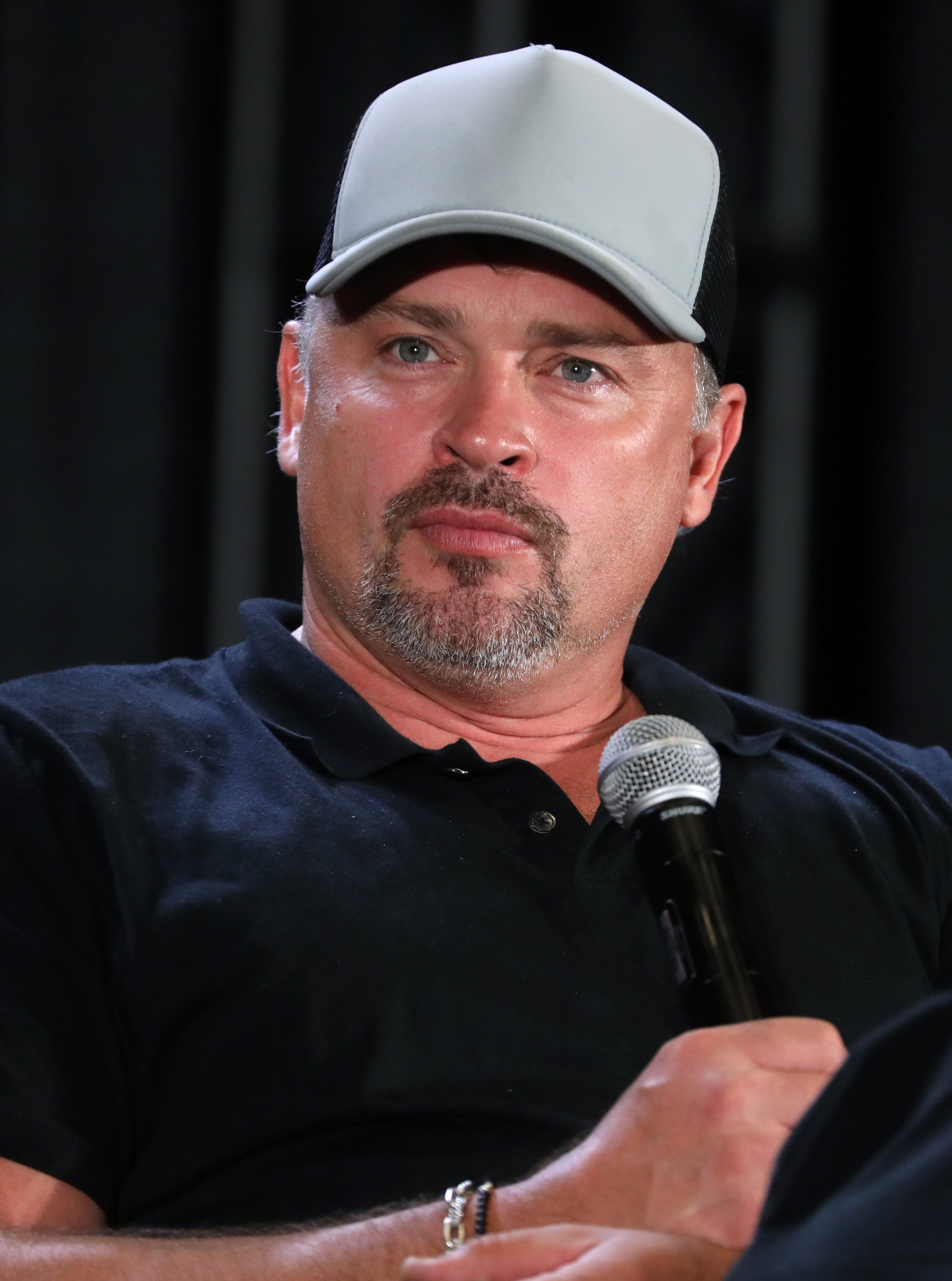
Tom Welling

- April 1
  - Harold Arceneaux, basketball player
  - Paul Kalanithi, neurosurgeon and writer (d. 2015)
  - Tangela Smith, basketball player
- April 3
  - Aiden Leslie, singer/songwriter
  - Chael Sonnen, mixed martial artist
- April 4 – Adam Dutkiewicz, musician and guitarist for Killswitch Engage and Times of Grace
- April 5 – Lee Eisenberg, screenwriter and producer
- April 6 – Teddy Sears, actor
- April 9 – Gerard Way, singer and frontman for My Chemical Romance
- April 10
  - Bethany Hart, hammer thrower
  - Stephanie Sheh, voice actress
- April 11 – Ron Nirenberg, politician, mayor of San Antonio, Texas (2017-present)
- April 12 – Sarah Jane Morris, actress
- April 14
  - Hameen Ali, football player
  - Nate Fox, basketball player (d. 2014)
  - Sarah Michelle Gellar, actress
  - Chandra Levy, intern (d. 2001)
  - Rob McElhenney, actor
  - David Valadao, politician
- April 15 – Matt Holt, heavy metal singer (d. 2017)
- April 16
  - Jordan Allen-Dutton, writer, producer, and director
  - Hayes MacArthur, actor, producer, and screenwriter
- April 18 – Bryce Johnson, actor
- April 21 – Bodhraj Acharya, Nepalese-born scientist
- April 22 – Owen Ashworth, musician
- April 23
  - Kal Penn, actor
  - John Cena, wrestler
  - Eric Edelstein, actor
  - Jaime King, actress and model
  - John Oliver, comedian
- April 25
  - Ricardo Aleman, author and comedian
  - Marguerite Moreau, actress
- April 26
  - Jason Earles, actor
  - Leonard Earl Howze, actor
  - Tom Welling, actor
- April 27
  - Courtney Alexander, basketball player
  - Kunimi Andrea, singer and actress
  - Samantha Nugent, politician
- April 29
  - Matt Bachand, guitarist for Shadows Fall
  - Titus O'Neill, wrestler
  - David Sullivan, actor
- April 30 – Alexandra Holden, actress

=== May ===
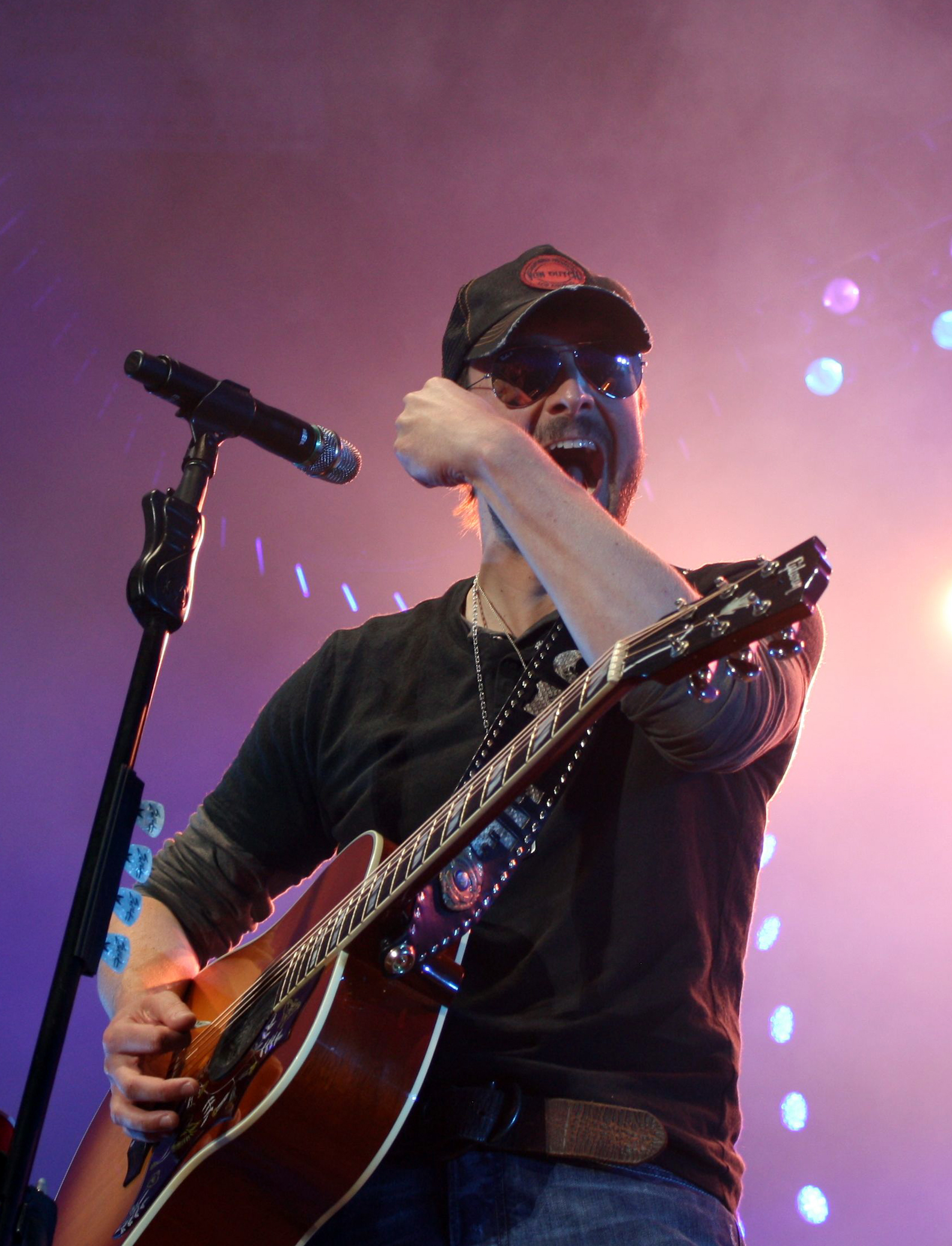
Eric Church

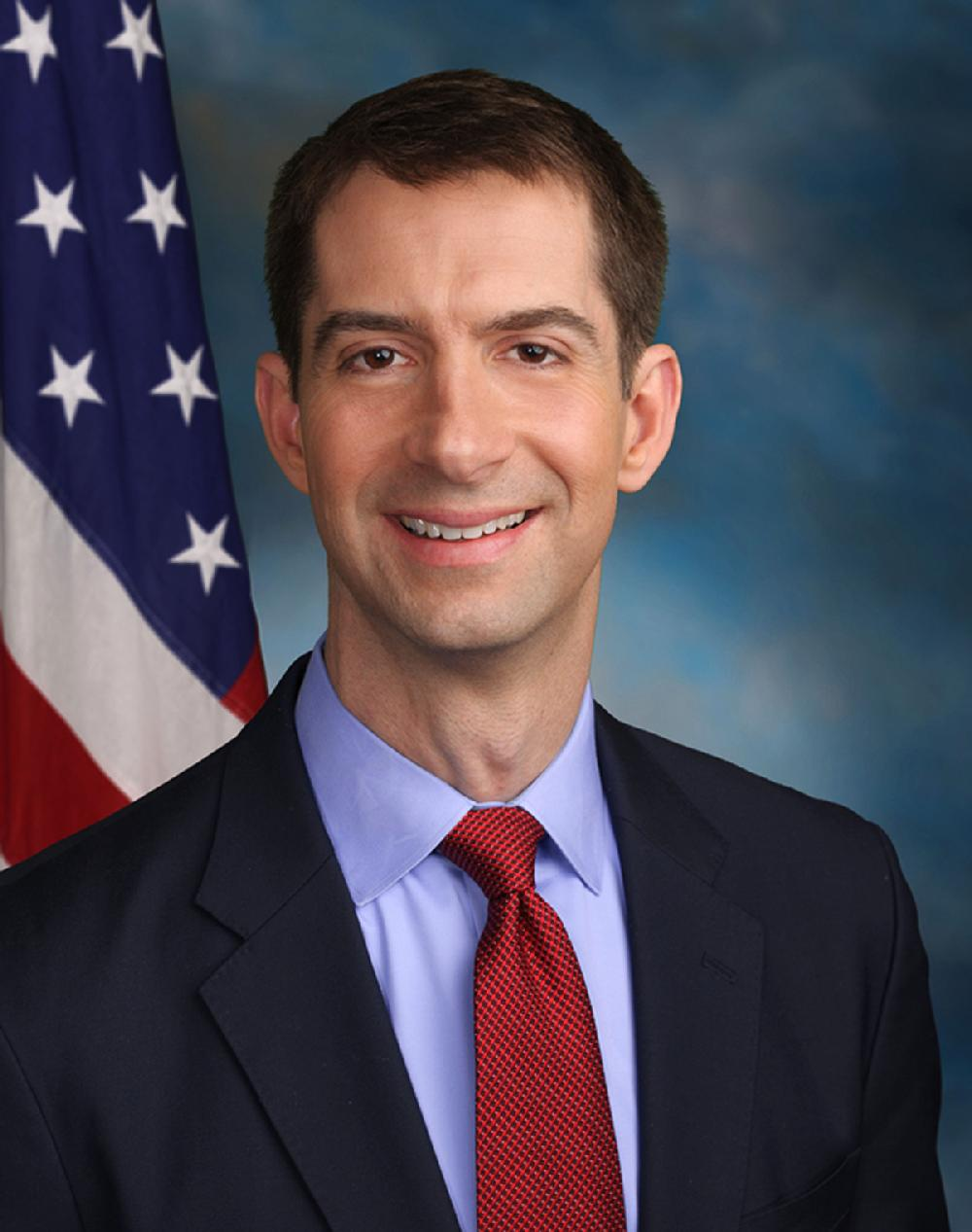
Tom Cotton

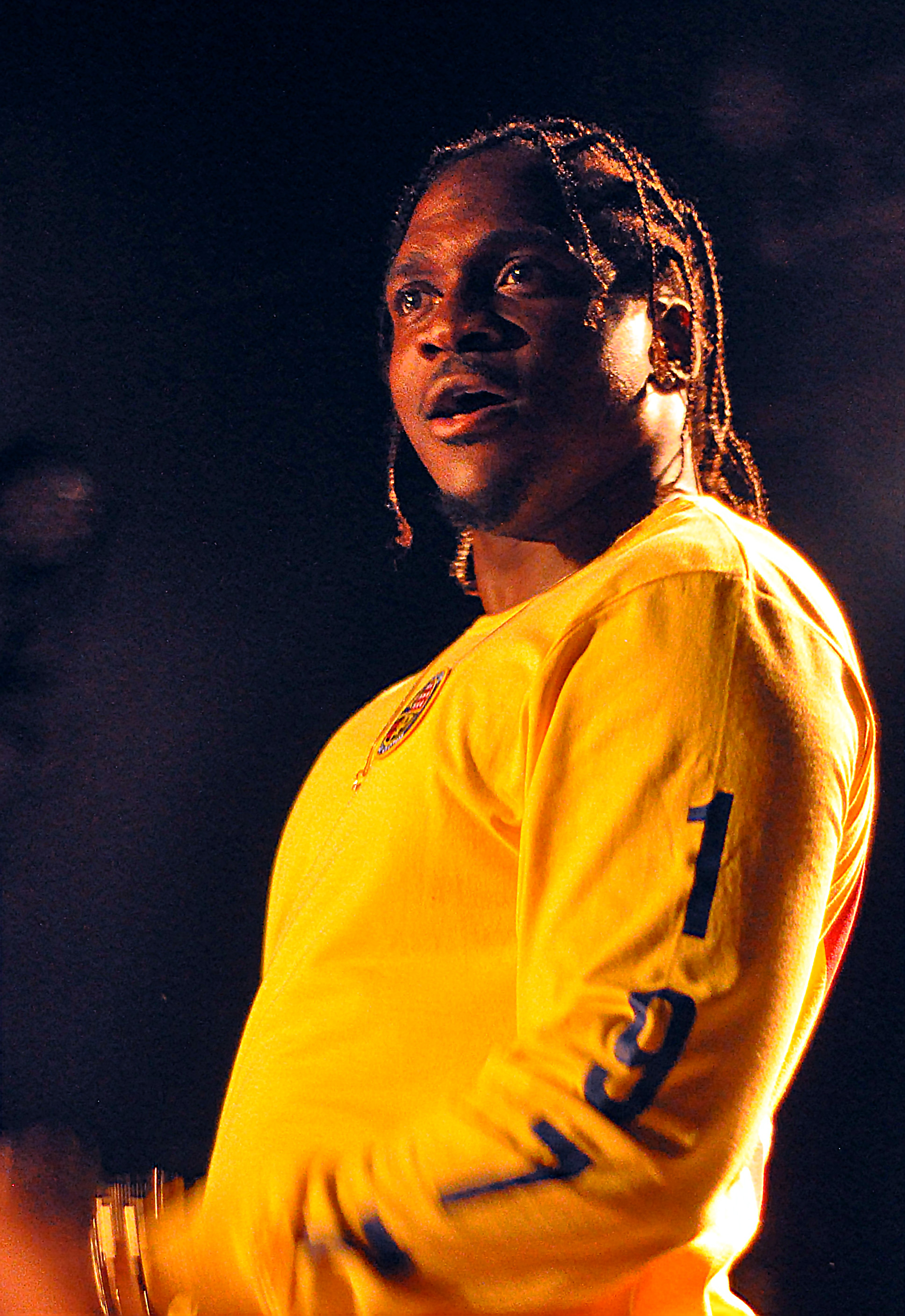
Pusha T

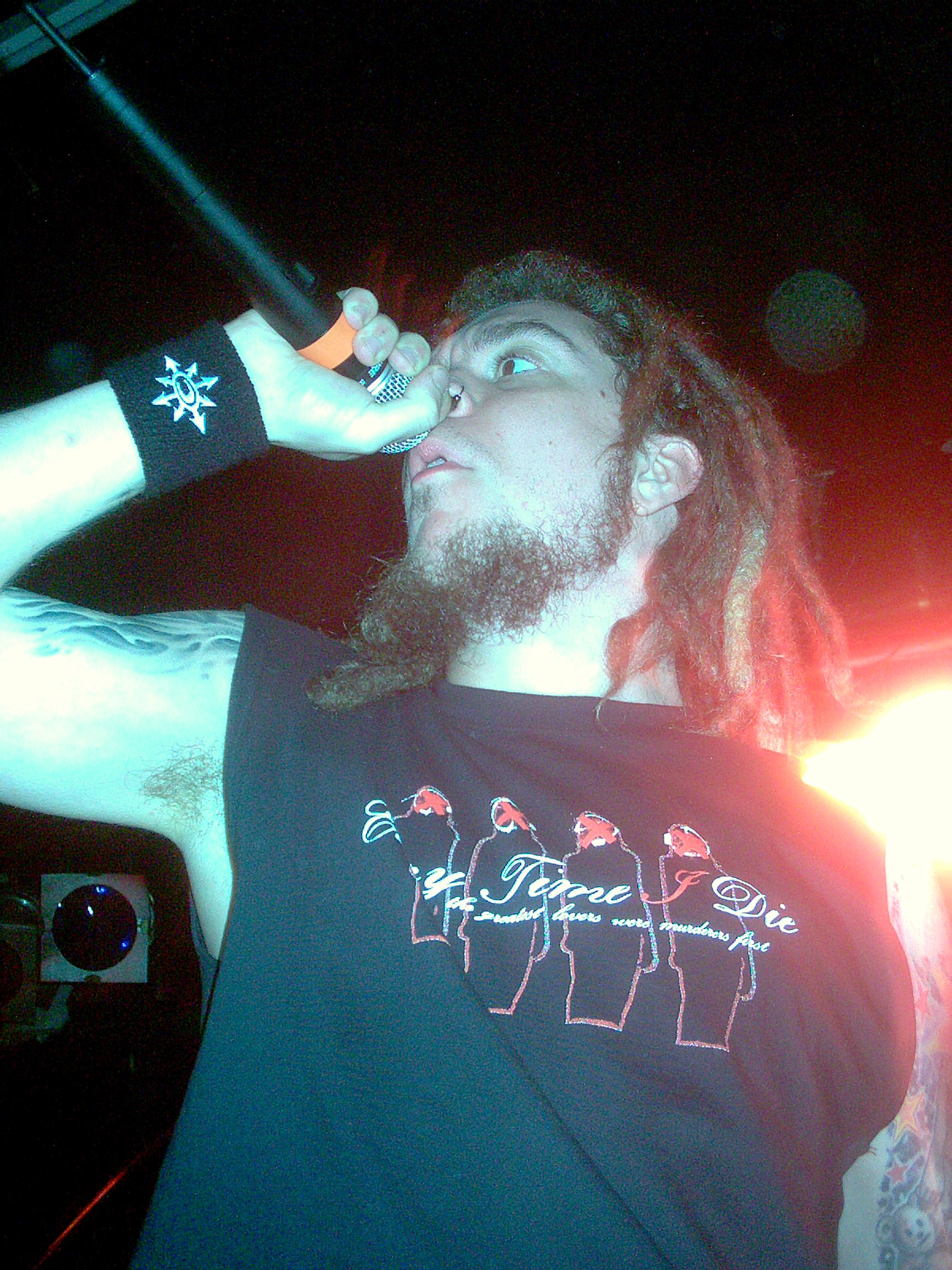
Mark Hunter

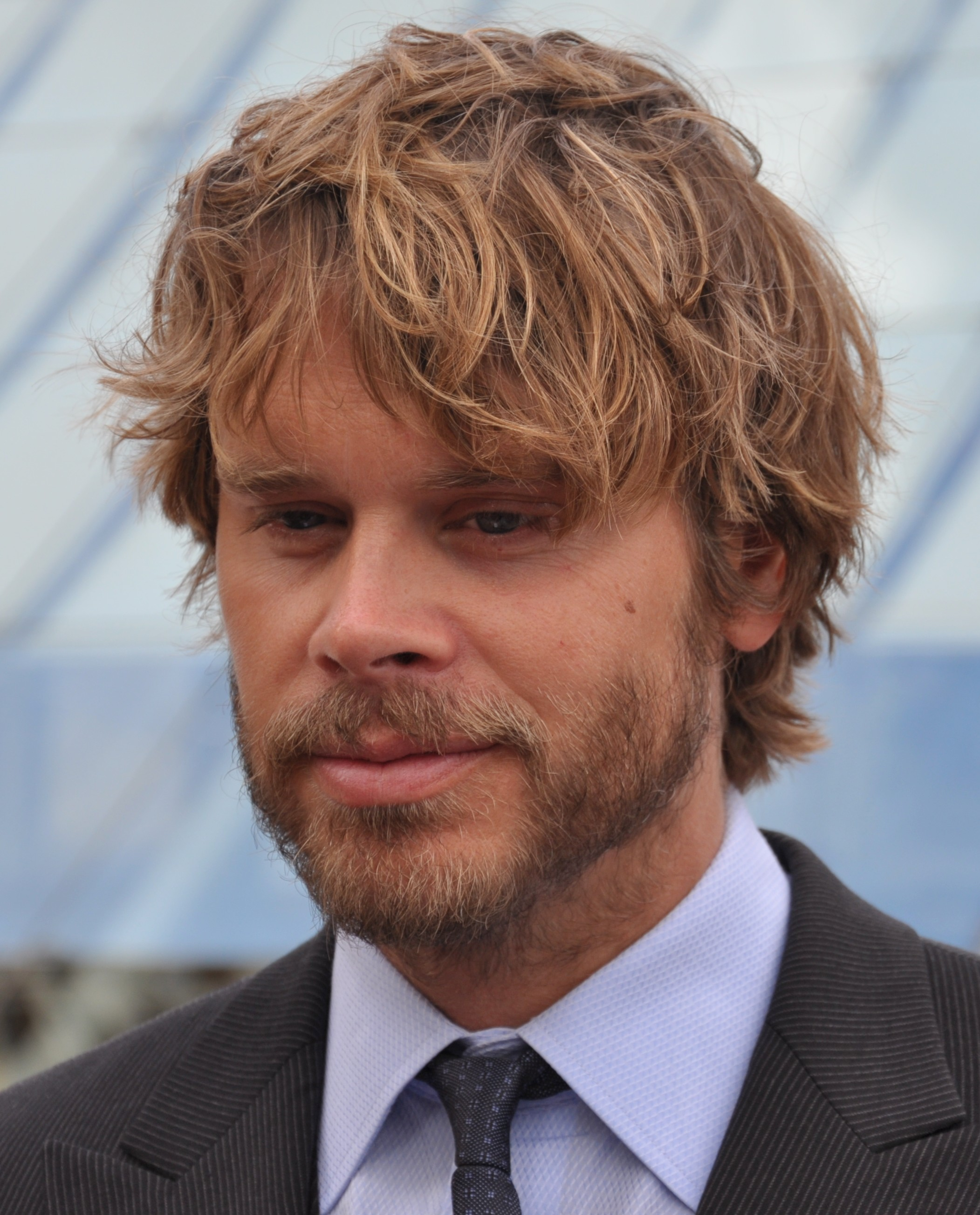
Eric Christian Olsen

- May 3
  - Ben Olsen, footballer
  - Eric Church, country music singer
  - Jeffrey Garcia, stand-up comedian, actor and voice actor
- May 5 – Tudor Dixon, businesswoman, political commentator, and political candidate
- May 6 – Brian Aldridge, politician
- May 9 – Maggie Dixon, basketball player and coach (d. 2006)
- May 11 – Sal Alosi, strength and conditioning coach
- May 12 – Rebecca Herbst, actress
- May 13
  - Tom Cotton, politician
  - Pusha T, rapper, songwriter, and record executive
  - Brian Thomas Smith, actor and comedian
- May 14 – Roy Halladay, baseball player (d. 2017)
- May 15 – Nate Tibbetts, basketball coach
- May 16 – Lynn Collins, actress
- May 17
  - Joaquin Arambula, politician
  - Welles Crowther, investment banker (d. 2001)
- May 18 – Ken Amato, football player
- May 19
  - Larry Abney, basketball player
  - Brandon Inge, baseball player
- May 20
  - Matt Czuchry, actor
  - Chad Muska, skateboarder
  - Tiger Tyson, gay pornographic film actor, model, and gay porn film director
- May 21 – Alicia Albe, gymnast
- May 23 – Heather Wahlquist, actress
- May 26 – Mark Hunter, singer and frontman for Chimaira
- May 27
  - Henry Aquino, politician
  - David Toland, politician, 52nd Lieutenant Governor of Kansas
- May 28 – Elisabeth Hasselbeck, talk show host
- May 29
  - Rory Albanese, comedian, comedy writer and television producer
  - Kevin Arbouet, director, writer, and producer
- May 31
  - Guma Aguiar, Brazilian-born businessman and industrialist (missing since 2012)
  - Eric Christian Olsen, actor

=== June ===
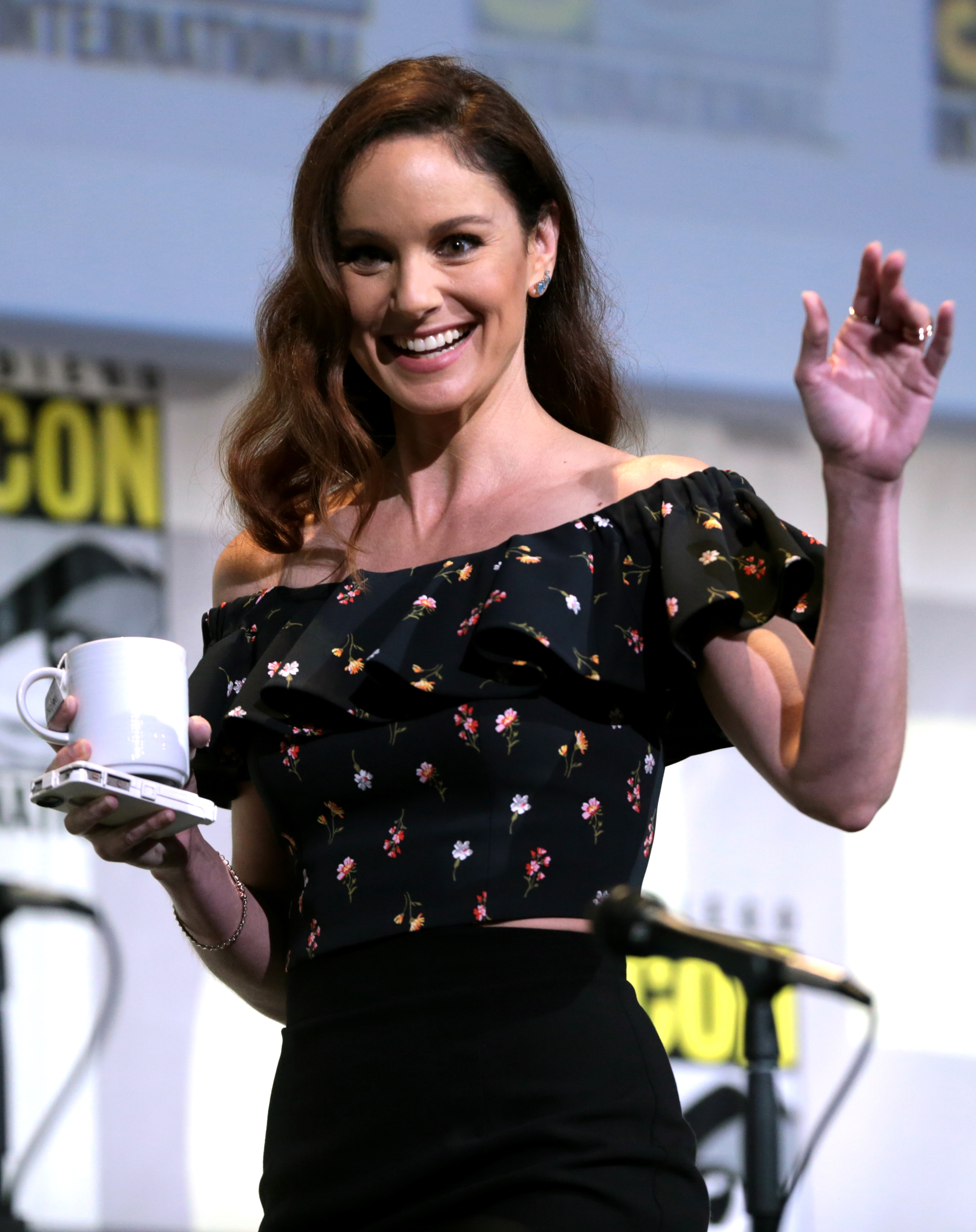
Sarah Wayne Callies

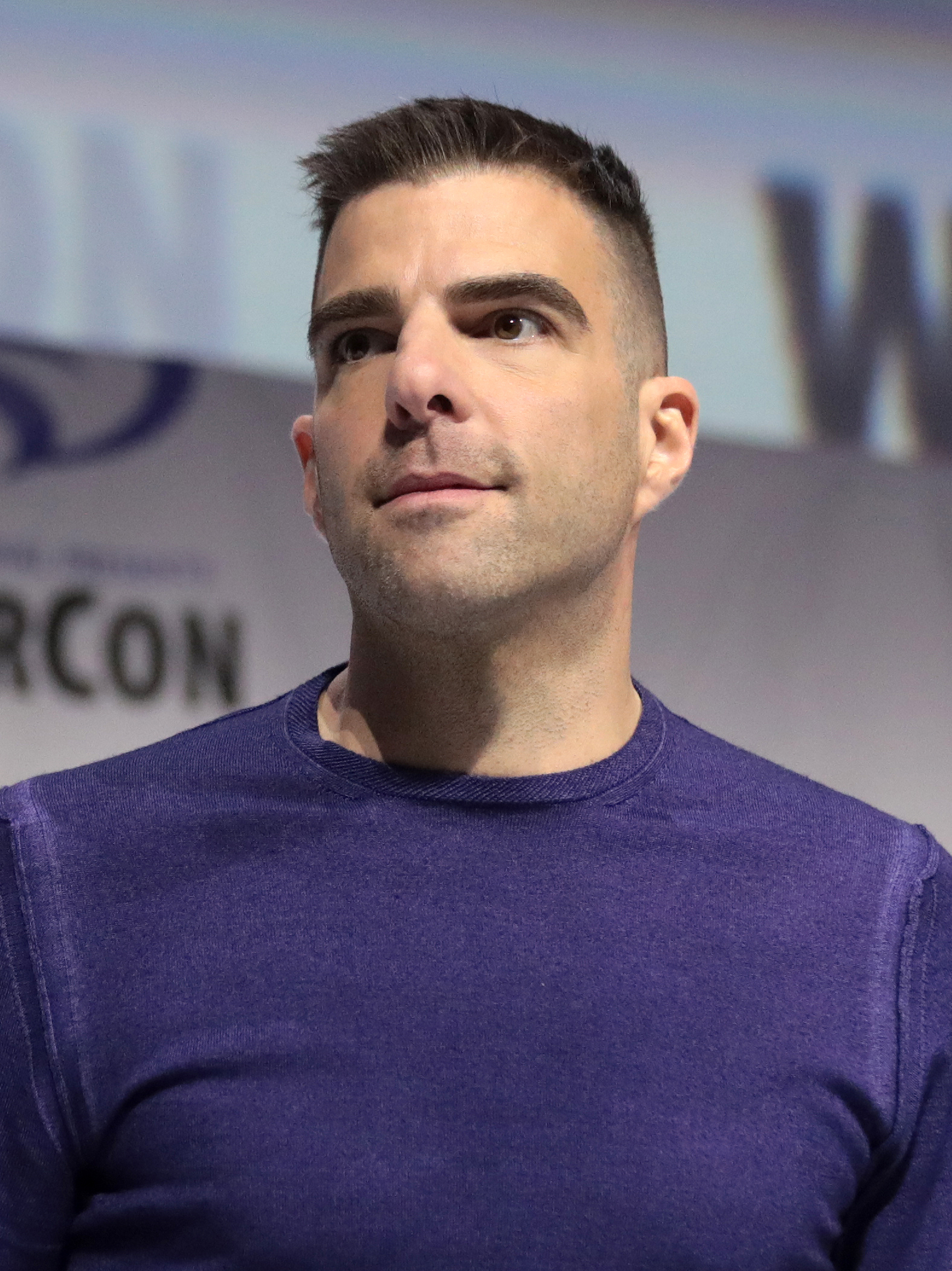
Zachary Quinto

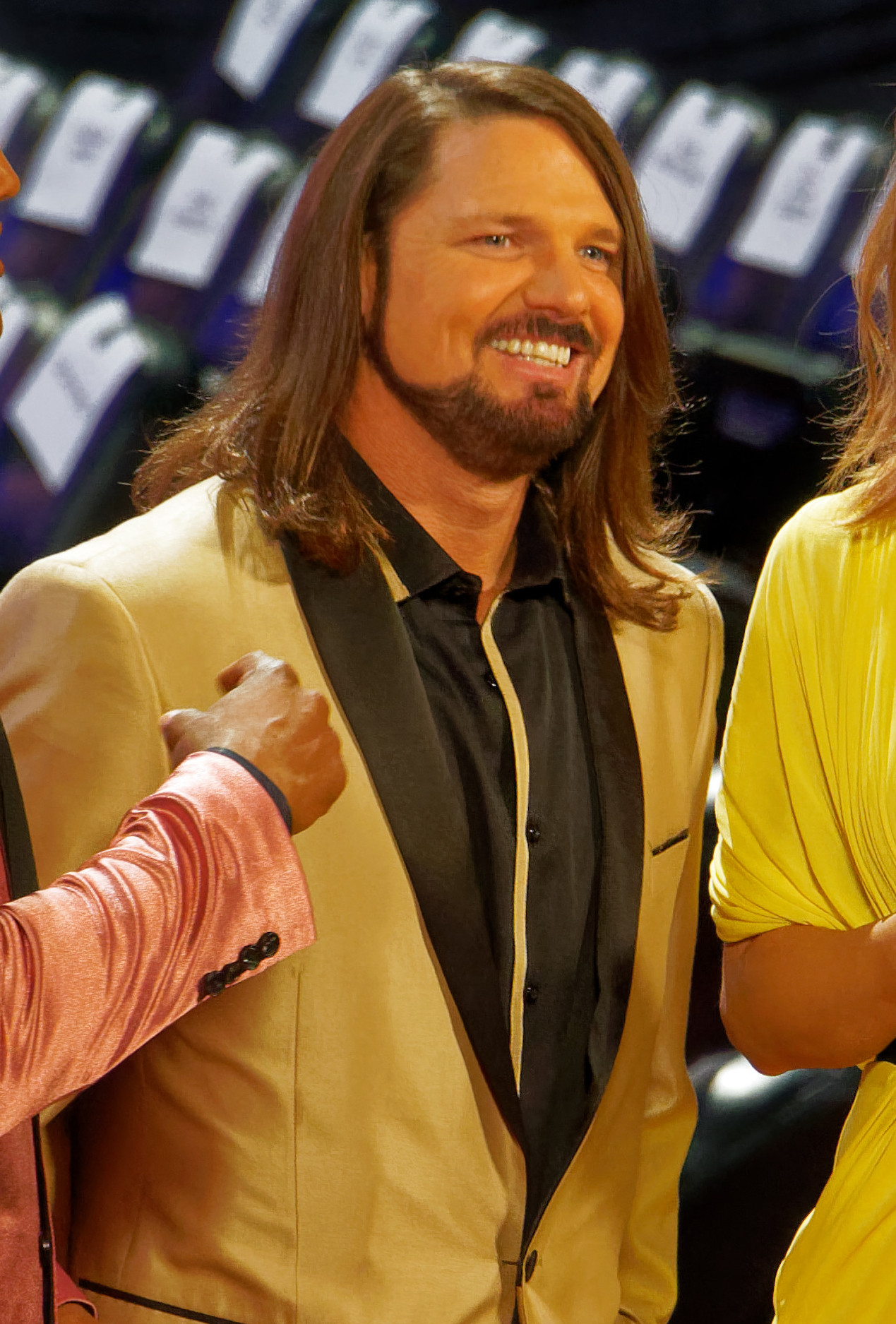
AJ Styles

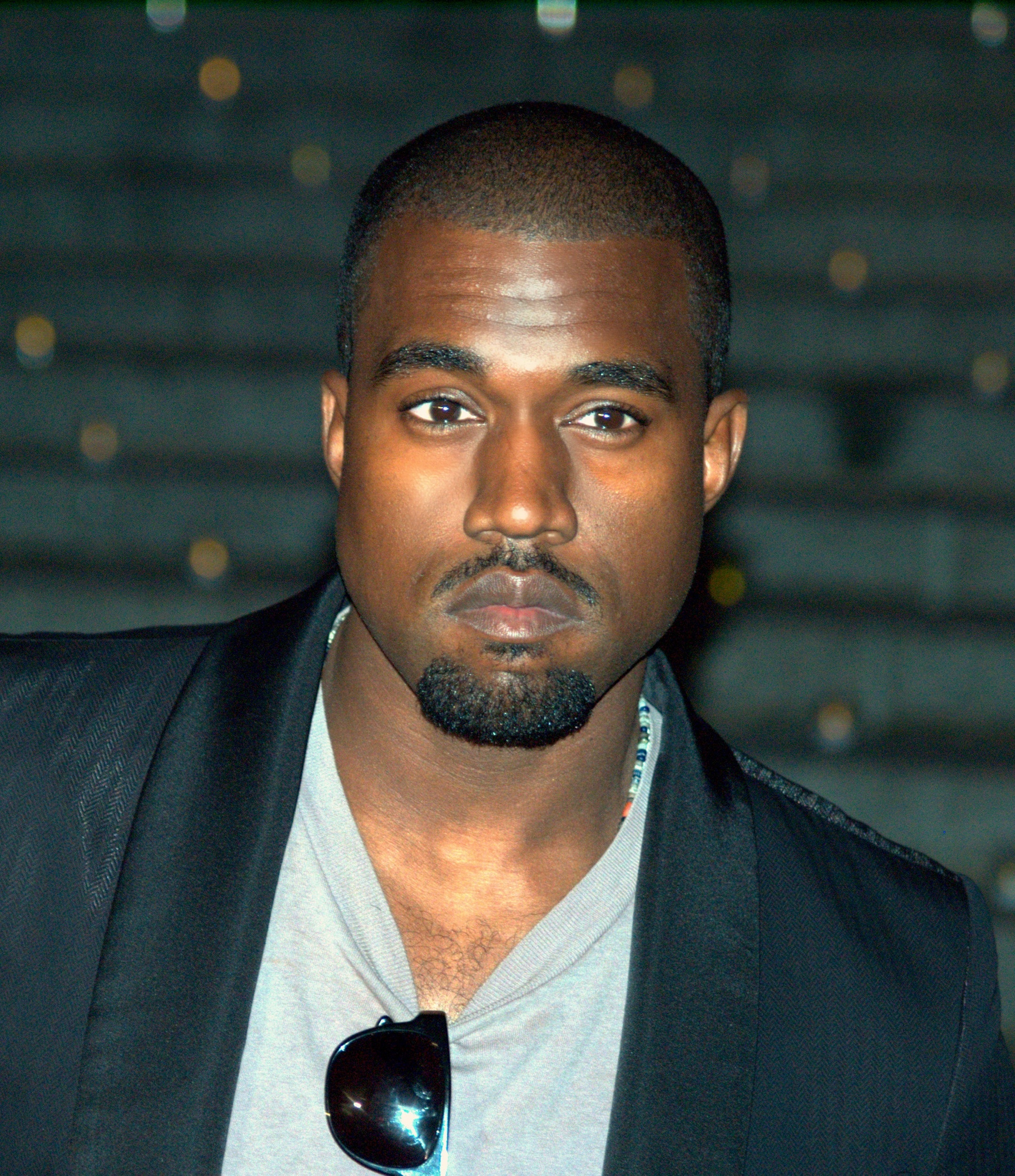
Kanye West

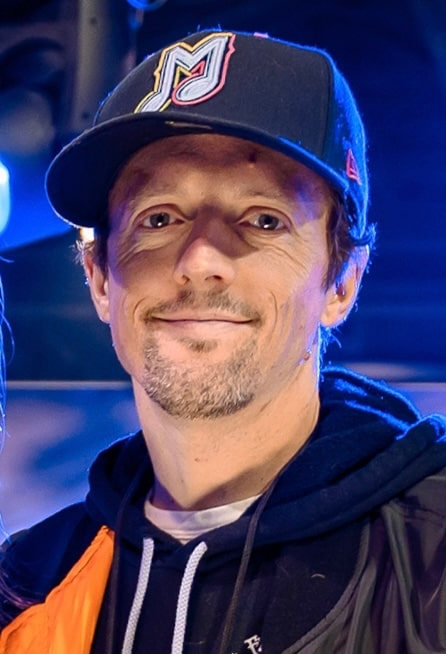
Jason Mraz

- June 1
  - Sarah Wayne Callies, actress
  - Danielle Harris, actress and director
  - James Storm, wrestler
- June 2
  - Zachary Quinto, actor
  - AJ Styles, wrestler
- June 3
  - Travis Hafner, baseball player
  - Az-Zahir Hakim, football player
- June 5
  - Kristin Gore, author and screenwriter
  - Christian Martucci, singer/songwriter and guitarist for Black President, The Strychnine Babies, Stone Sour, and The Chelsea Smiles
- June 6 – Matt Heinz, doctor and politician
- June 7 – Joe Horgan, baseball player
- June 8 – Kanye West, recording artist
- June 10 – Benjamin Millepied, French-born actor and ballet dancer
- June 11
  - Darnell Alford, football player
  - Ryan Dunn, television personality (d. 2011)
- June 12 – Kenny Wayne Shepherd, singer-songwriter and guitarist
- June 13 – Erin Toughill, boxer and mixed martial artist
- June 14
  - Rashard Anderson, football player (d. 2022)
  - De'Adre Aziza, actress and singer
  - Chris McAlister, football player
- June 16
  - Rich Attonito, mixed martial artist
  - Kerry Wood, baseball player
- June 19 – Peter Warrick, football player
- June 20
  - Ronnie Gene Blevins, actor
  - Stephanie White, basketball player
- June 23 – Jason Mraz, singer/songwriter
- June 25
  - Jon Akin, soccer player
  - Tim Anderson, musician, songwriter, and producer
- June 27 – Dan Andriano, bassist for Alkaline Trio and The Damned Things
- June 28 – Blair Butler, comedian
- June 29
  - Jeff Baena, screenwriter and director (d. 2025)
  - Bradley Stryker, actor
- June 30
  - Lyndon Amick, stock car racing driver
  - Colton Dunn, actor, writer, and producer

=== July ===
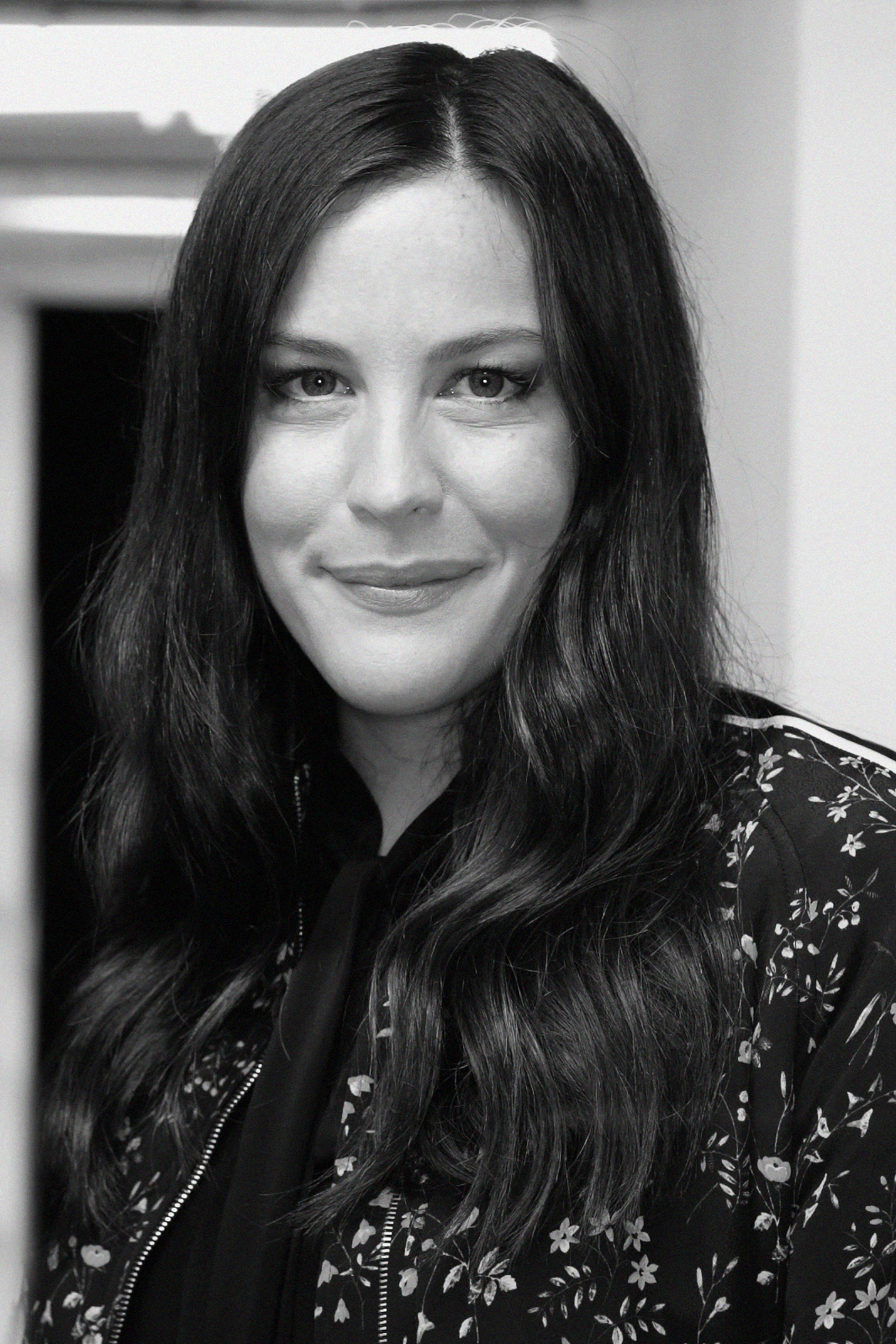
Liv Tyler

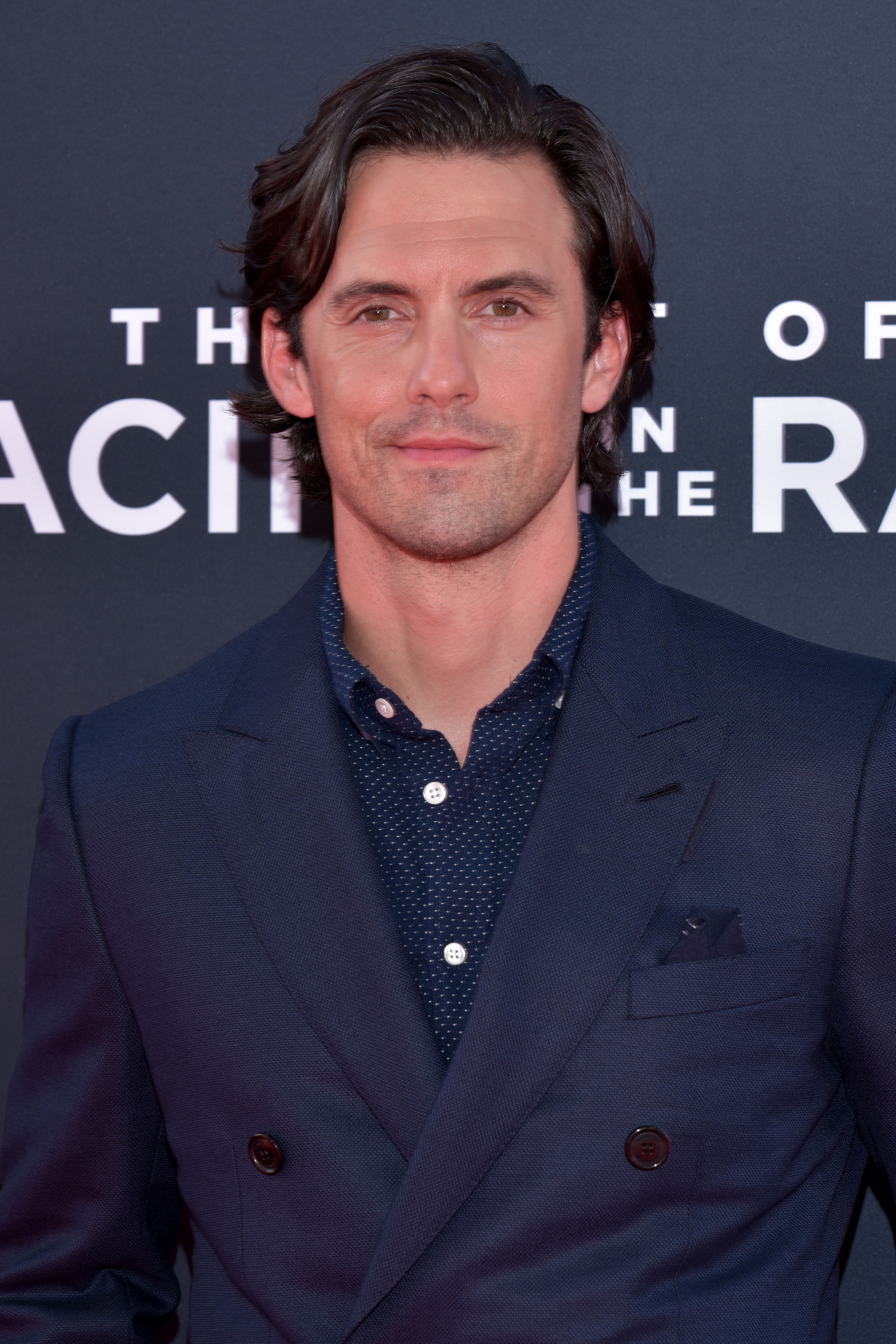
Milo Ventimiglia

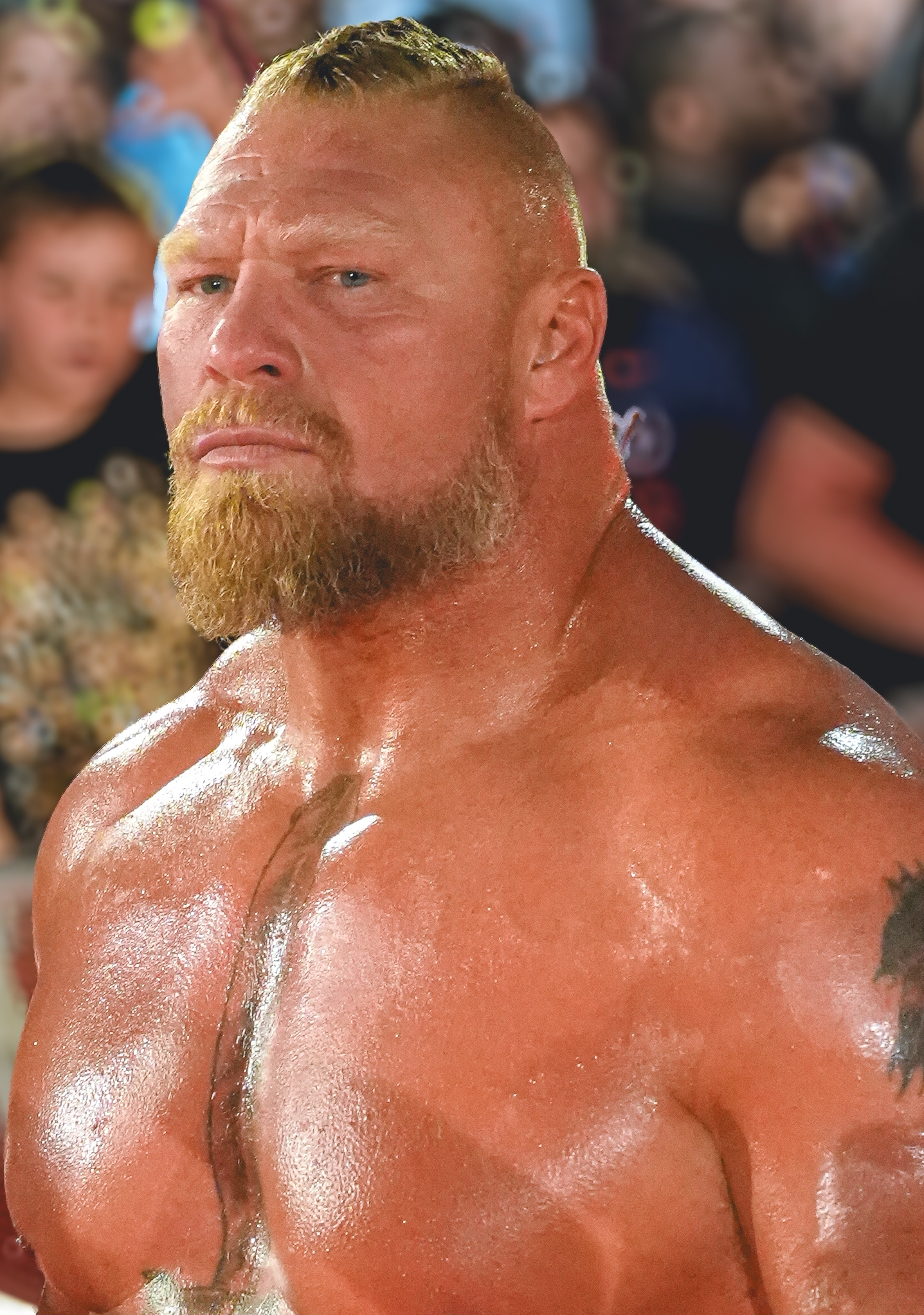
Brock Lesnar

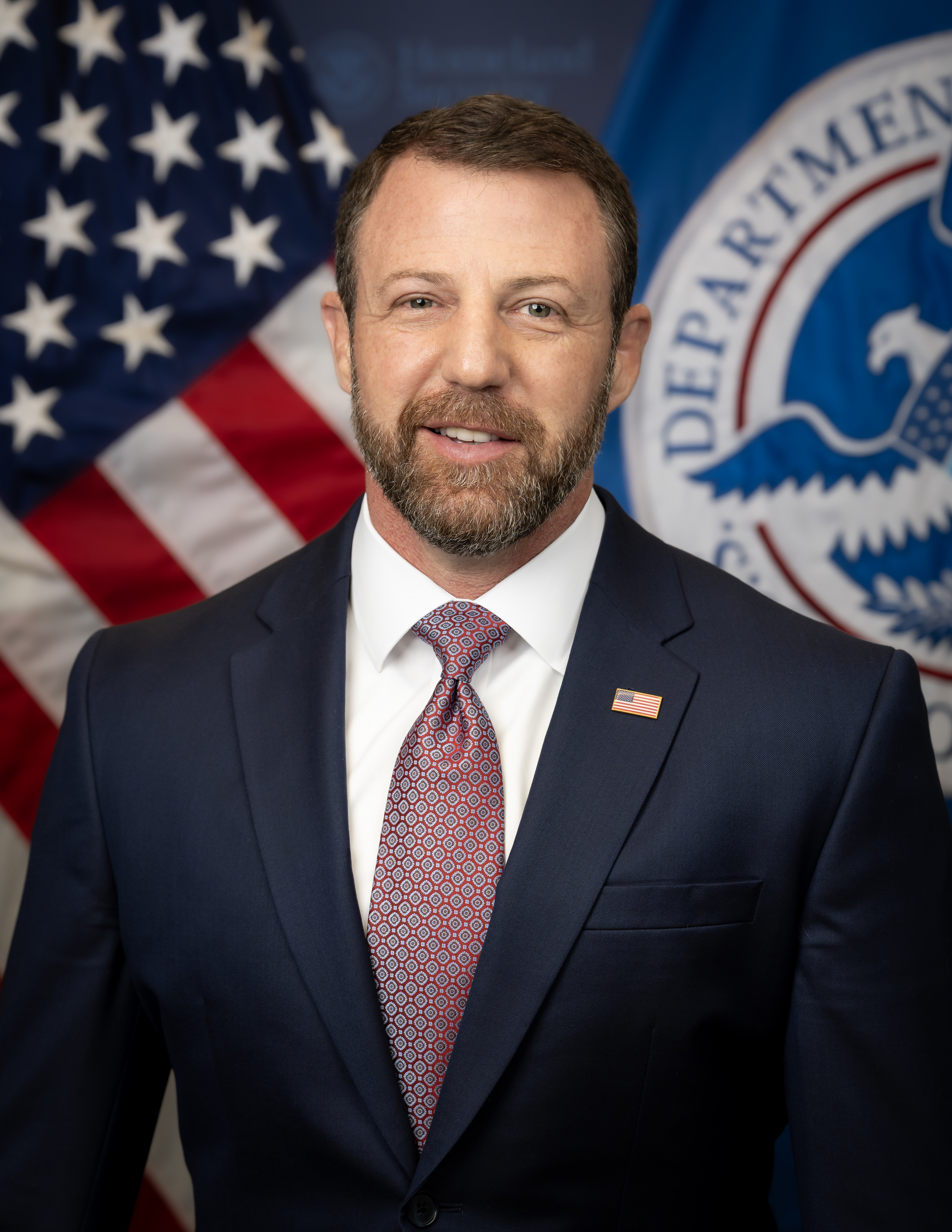
Markwayne Mullin

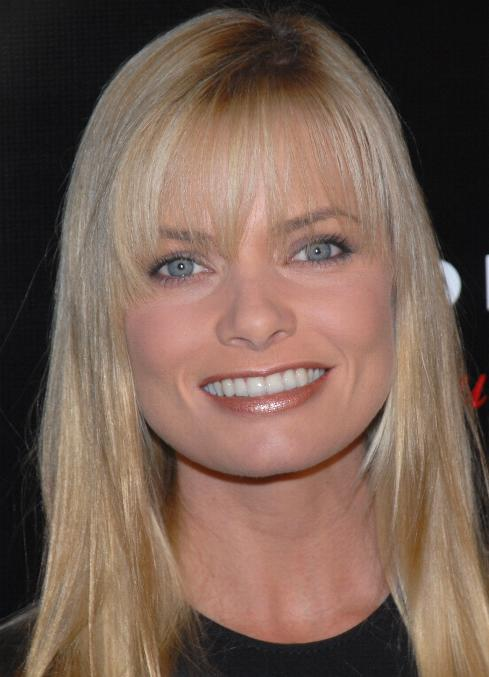
Jaime Pressly

- July 1
  - Pamela Rogers Turner, teacher and child rapist
  - Liv Tyler, actress
  - Lovely Warren, politician, mayor of Rochester, New York (2014-2021)
- July 4 – Stephen Rannazzisi, actor and comedian
- July 5 – Steven Sharp Nelson, cellist
- July 6
  - Joe Gruters, politician and RNC chairperson (2025-present)
  - Justin Lyon, producer for Yo Gabba Gabba!
- July 7
  - Tori Alamaze, singer
  - Jessica Chobot, host and writer
  - Dan Whitesides, drummer for The Used
- July 8 – Milo Ventimiglia, actor
- July 9 – Sarah Ashton-Cirillo, journalist
- July 10 – Cary Joji Fukunaga, director, writer, and cinematographer
- July 11 – Edward Moss, impersonator
- July 12
  - Steve Howey, actor
  - Brock Lesnar, wrestler and mixed martial artist
- July 13
  - Michael Alan, artist
  - Ashley Scott, actress
  - Kari Wahlgren, voice actress
- July 15
  - Lana Parrilla, actress
  - Ray Toro, musician
- July 16 – Brian Cook, bassist
- July 17 – Brandon Ash, stock car racing driver
- July 19 – Danny Roberts, television personality and recruiter
- July 21 – Heather Armbrust, bodybuilder
- July 26 – Markwayne Mullin, politician, U.S. Secretary of Homeland Security (2026-present)
- July 27
  - Martha Madison, actress
  - Jason Zimbler, actor
- July 28
  - Travis Alexander, murder victim (d. 2008)
  - Dexter Jackson, football player and sportscaster
  - Chris Samuels, football player and coach
- July 29 – Balamurali Ambati, Indian-born ophthalmologist, educator, and researcher
- July 30 – Jaime Pressly, actress
- July 31 – Tim Couch, football player

=== August ===
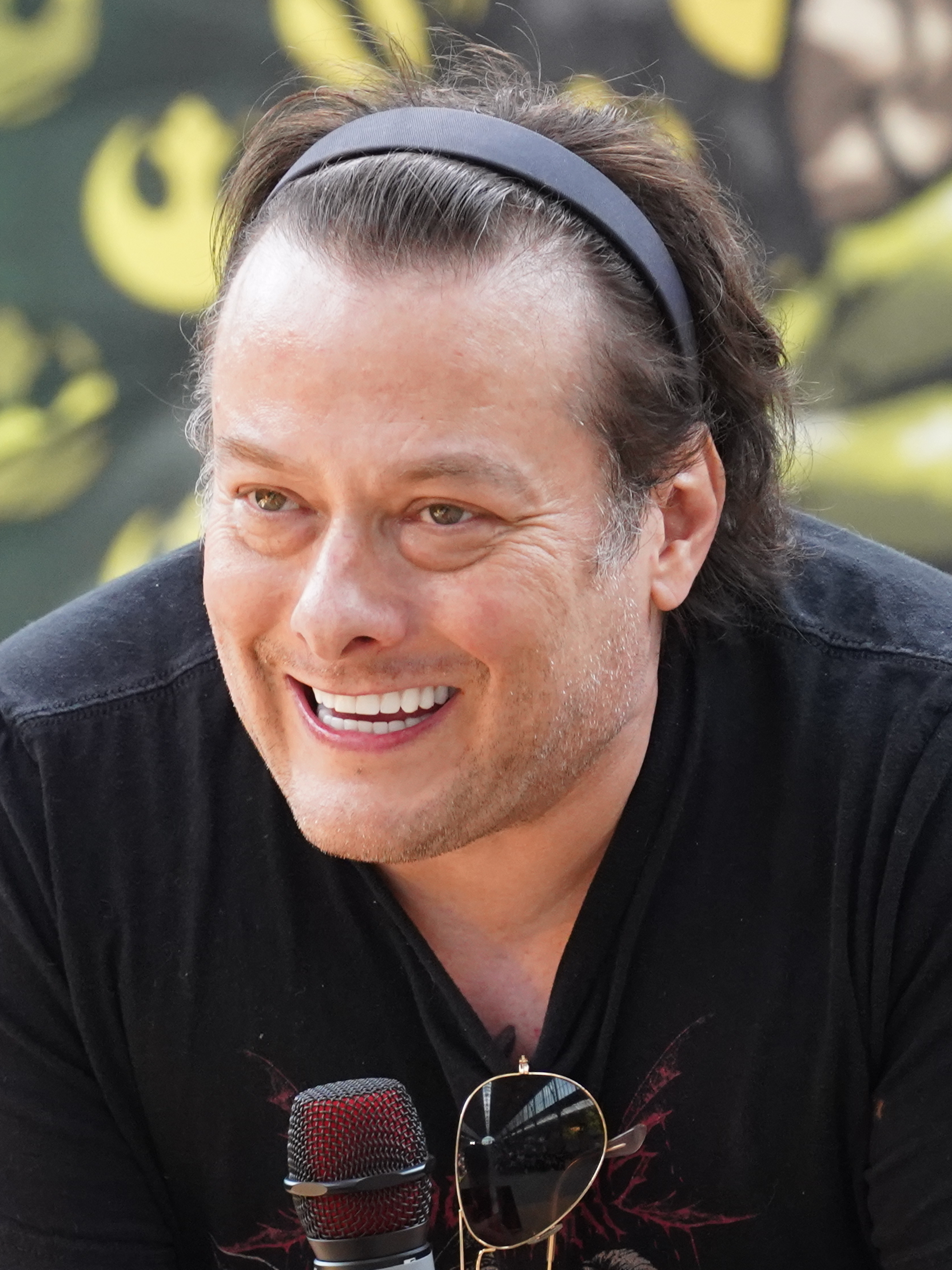
Edward Furlong

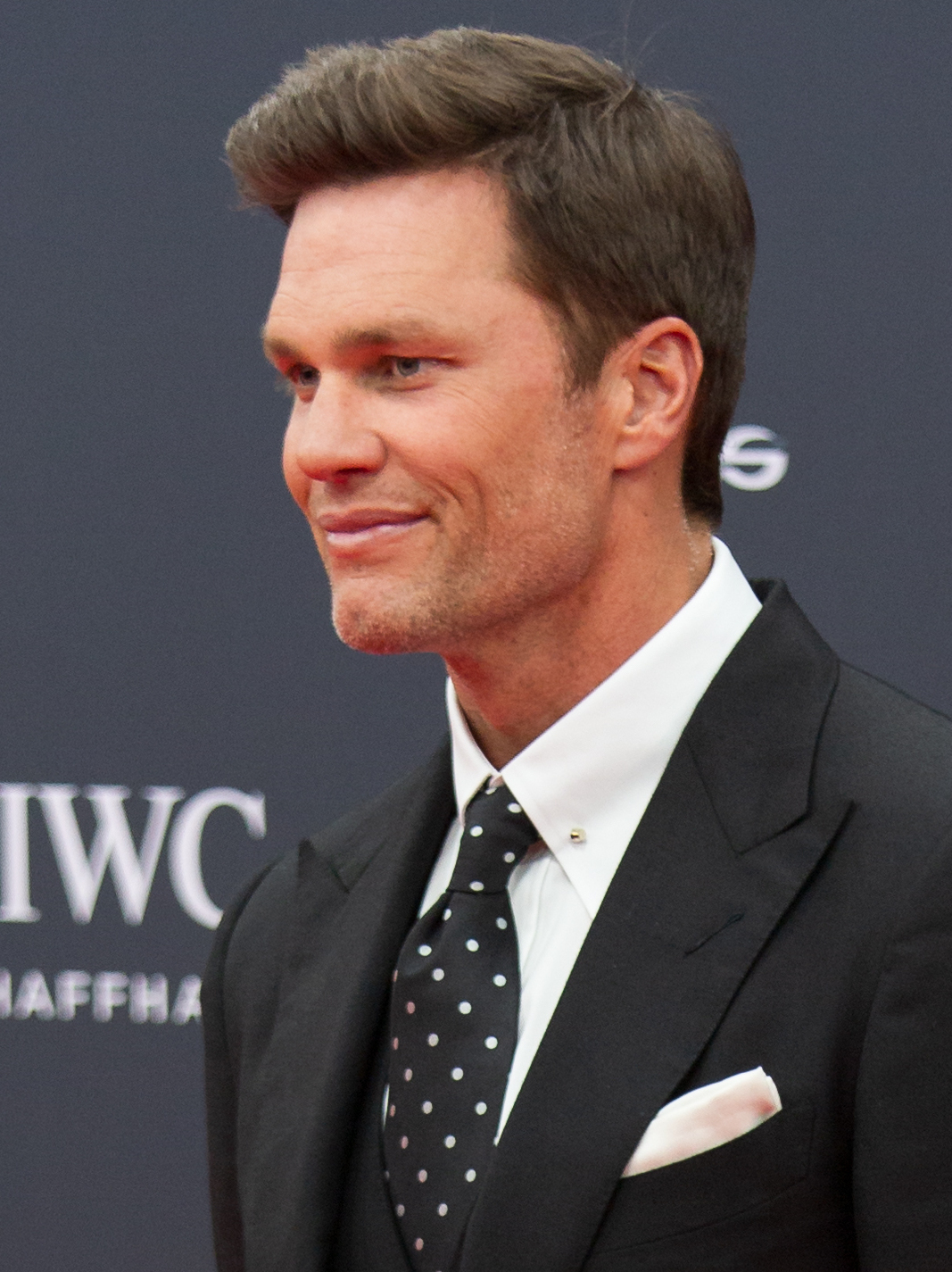
Tom Brady

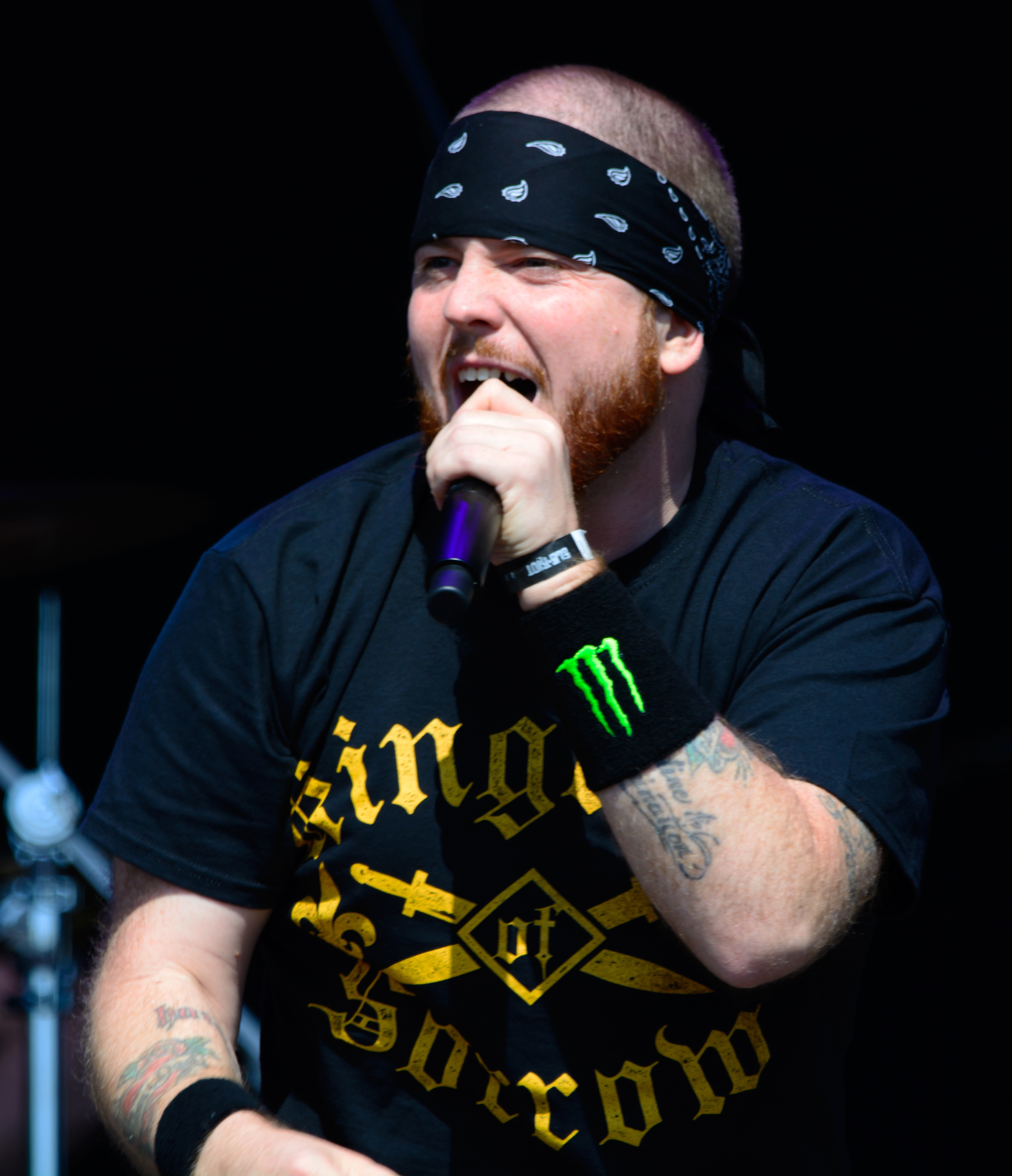
Jamey Jasta

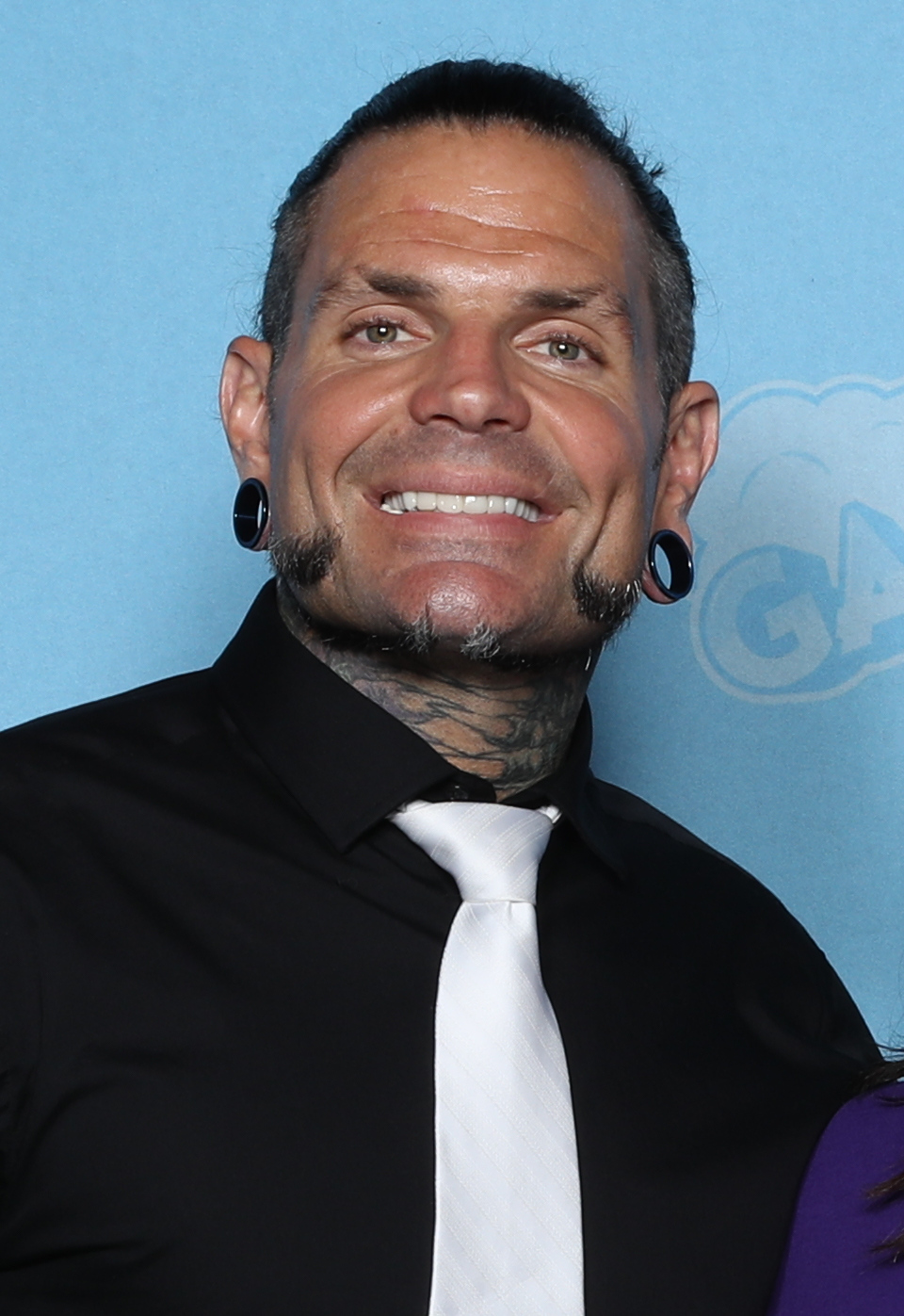
Jeff Hardy

- August 2
  - Julián Alonso, Spanish-born tennis player
  - Edward Furlong, actor
  - Marc Rizzo, guitarist for Soulfly and Ill Niño
  - Jill Underly, politician
- August 3
  - Karen Alloy, comedian
  - Tom Brady, football player and entrepreneur
- August 4
  - Dada 5000, Bahamian-born mixed martial artist and internet personality
  - Kazarian, wrestler
- August 6 – Ashlie Atkinson, actress
- August 7 – Jamey Jasta, singer and frontman for Hatebreed and Kingdom of Sorrow
- August 8
  - Michael Chernus, actor
  - Lindsay Sloane, actress
- August 9 – Rumaan Alam, writer
- August 11 – Pablo Lucio Vasquez, murderer executed by lethal injection (d. 2016)
- August 12 – Plaxico Burress, football player
- August 14
  - Kyle Abraham, choreographer and dancer
  - Al Shearer, actor
  - Silent Servant, DJ and music producer (d. 2024)
- August 19
  - T. J. Holmes, journalist and television personality
  - Analilia Meija, politician
  - Will Hurd, politician and CIA officer
- August 23
  - Chris M. Allport, filmmaker, actor, singer, and symphonic composer
  - Nicole Bobek, figure skater
  - Jared Fogle, weight loss advocate, former spokesman of Subway, convicted child sex offender
- August 24 – John Green, author, vlogger, and editor
- August 26 – Morris Peterson, basketball player
- August 27 – Ma$e, rapper
- August 28
  - G. T. Bynum, politician, mayor of Tulsa, Oklahoma (2016-2024)
  - Ginger D. Anders, lawyer and politician
- August 29
  - John Hensley, actor
  - Aida Rodriguez, comedian
- August 30
  - Jon Adkins, baseball player
  - Shaun Alexander, football player
  - Alvin Greene, politician (d. 2026)
  - Elden Henson, actor
  - Félix Sánchez, Olympic hurdler
- August 31
  - Jeff Hardy, wrestler
  - Del Marquis, guitarist for Scissor Sisters

=== September ===
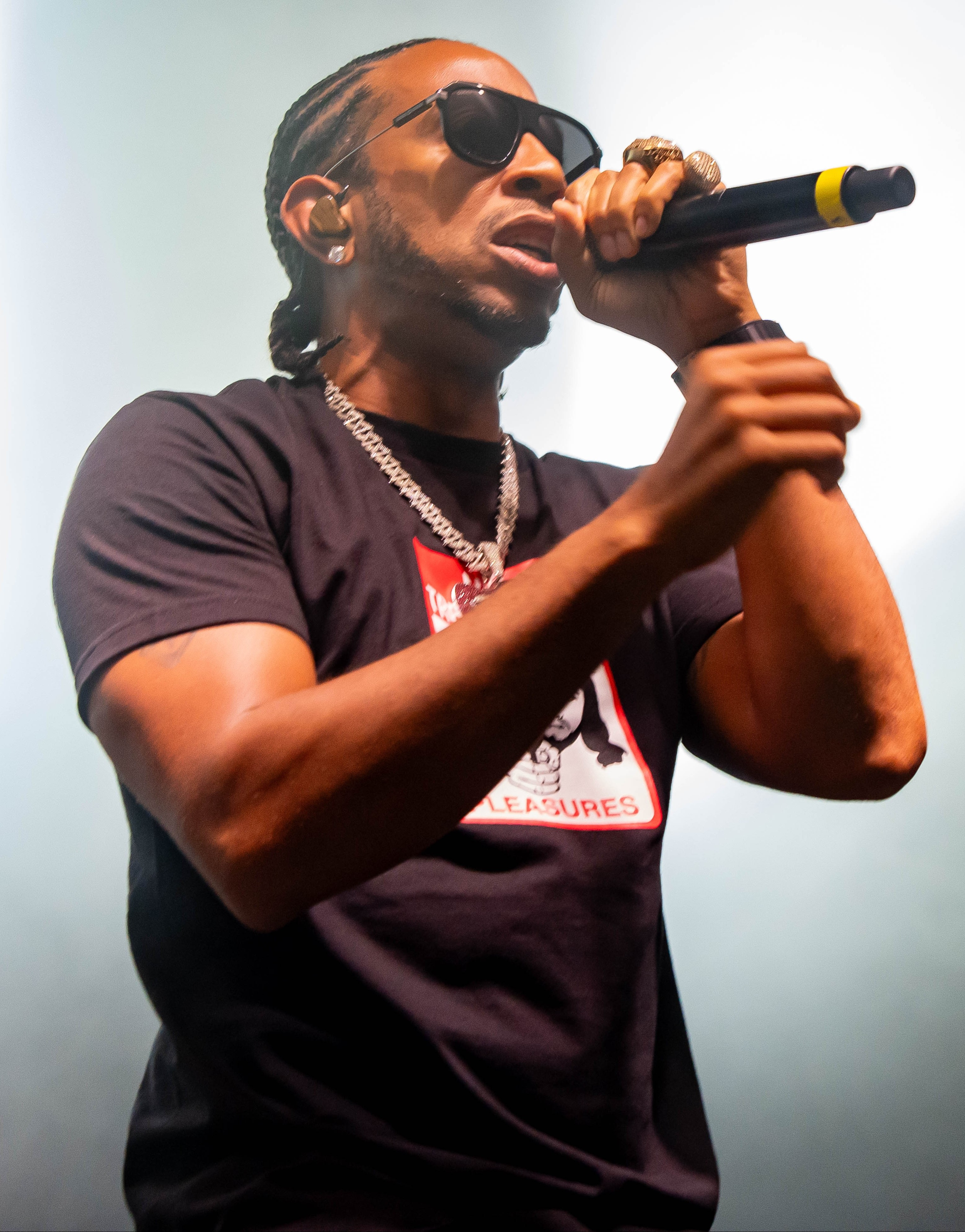
Ludacris

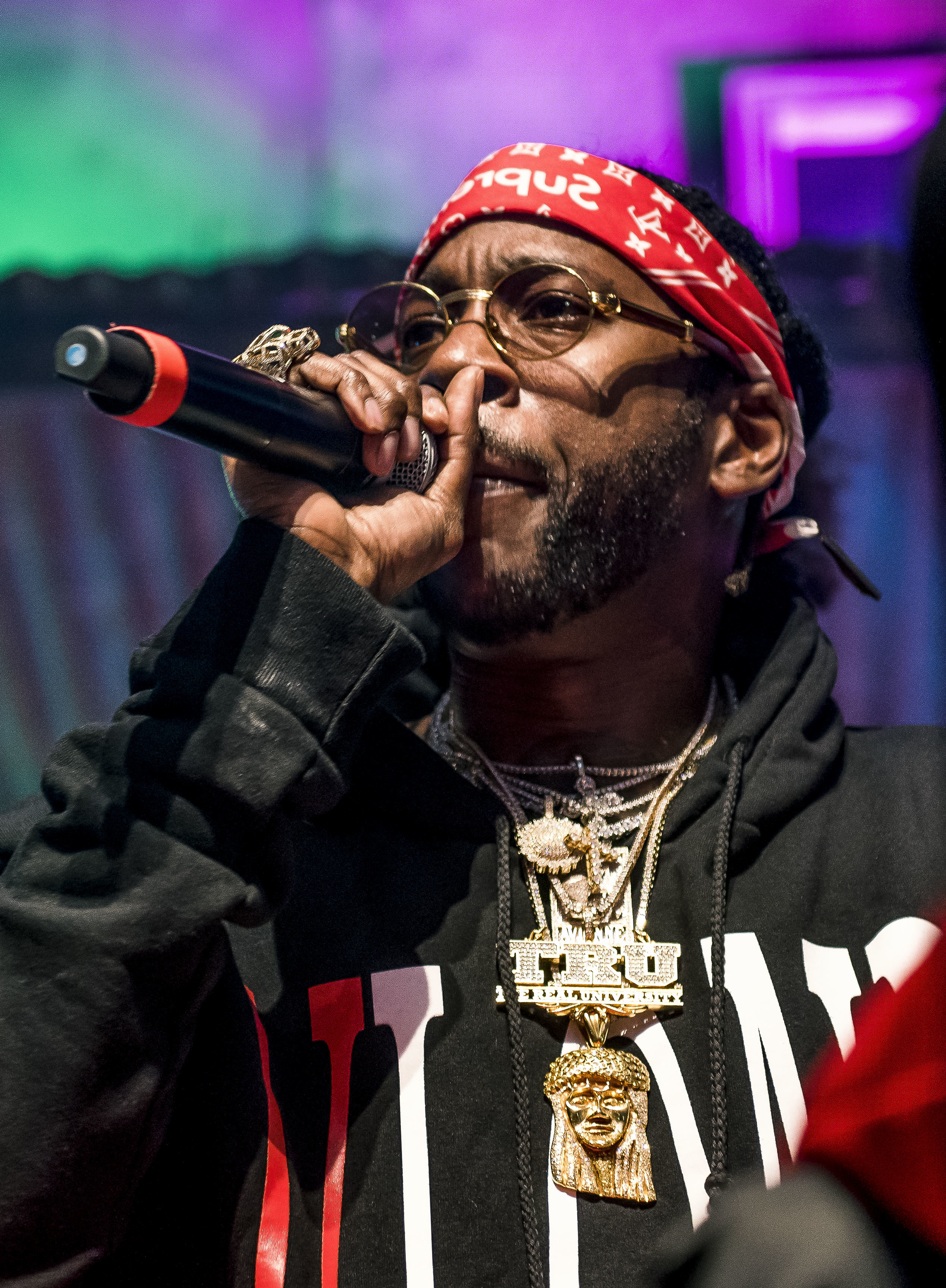
2 Chainz

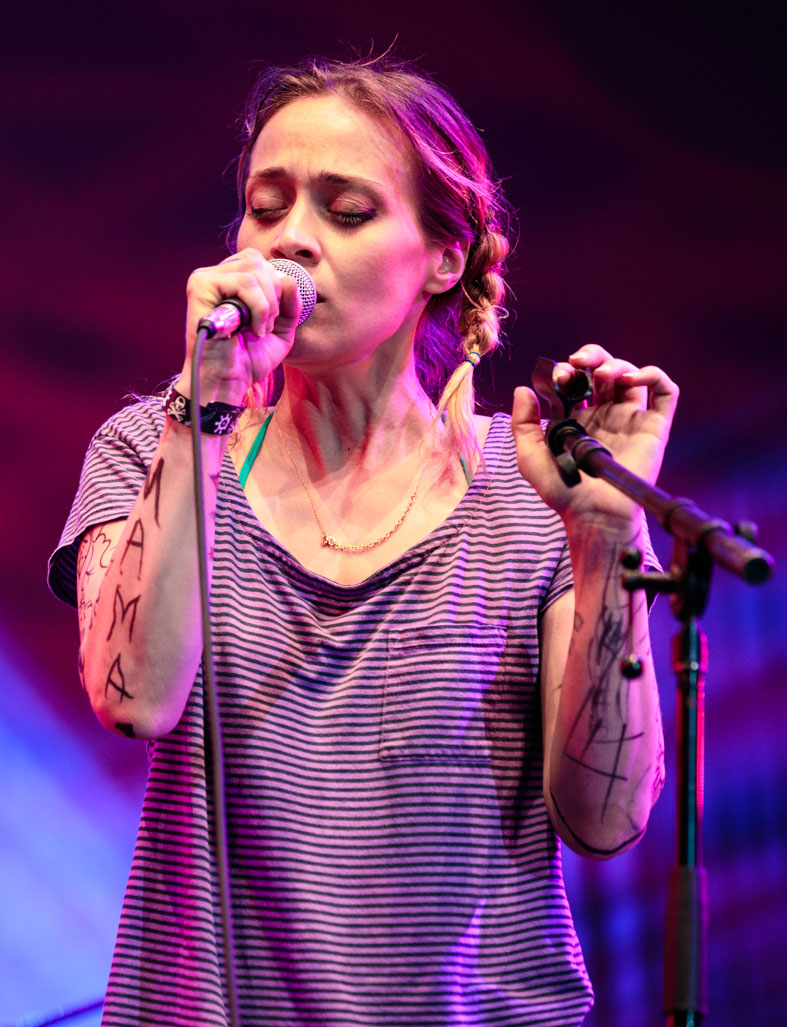
Fiona Apple

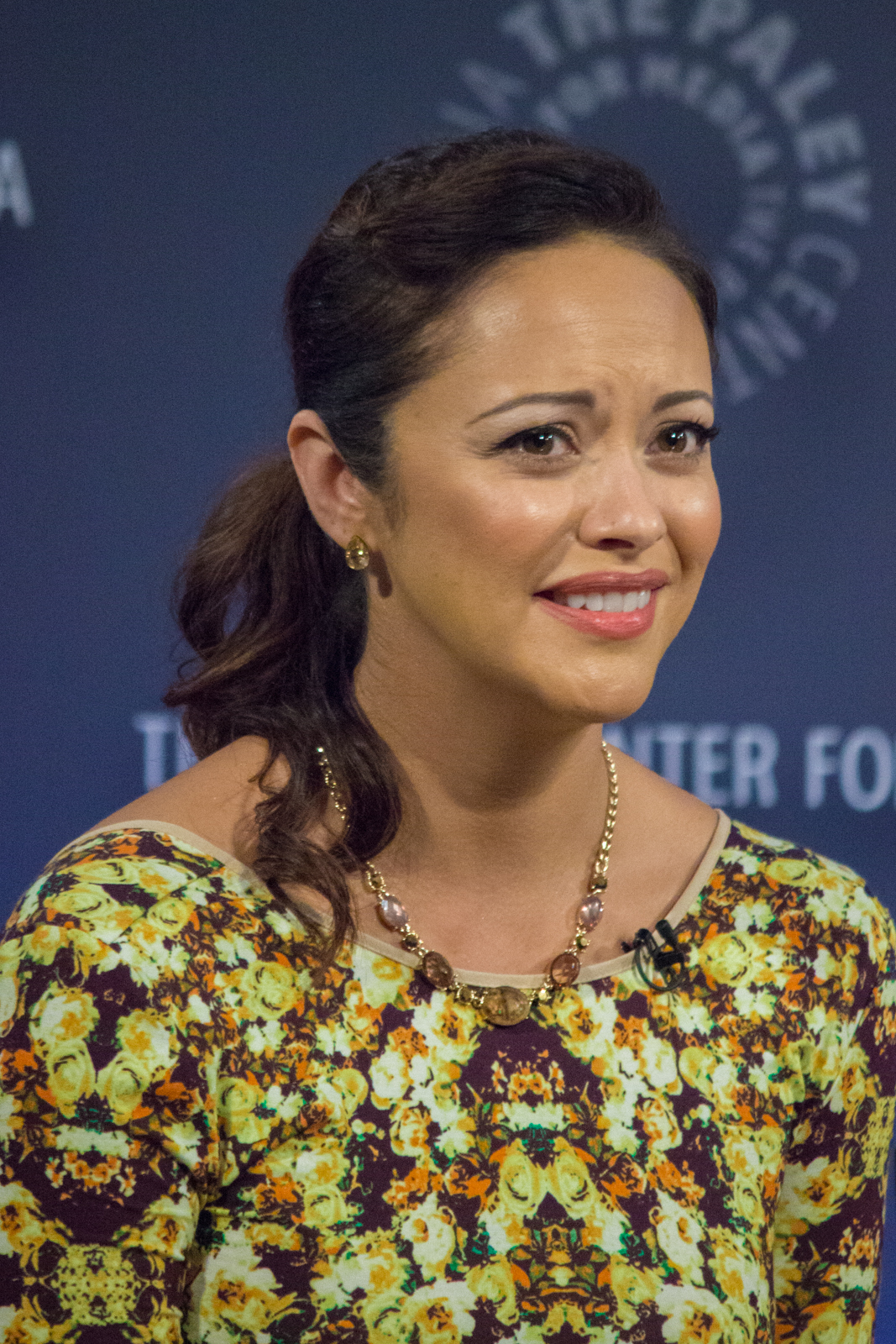
Marisa Ramirez

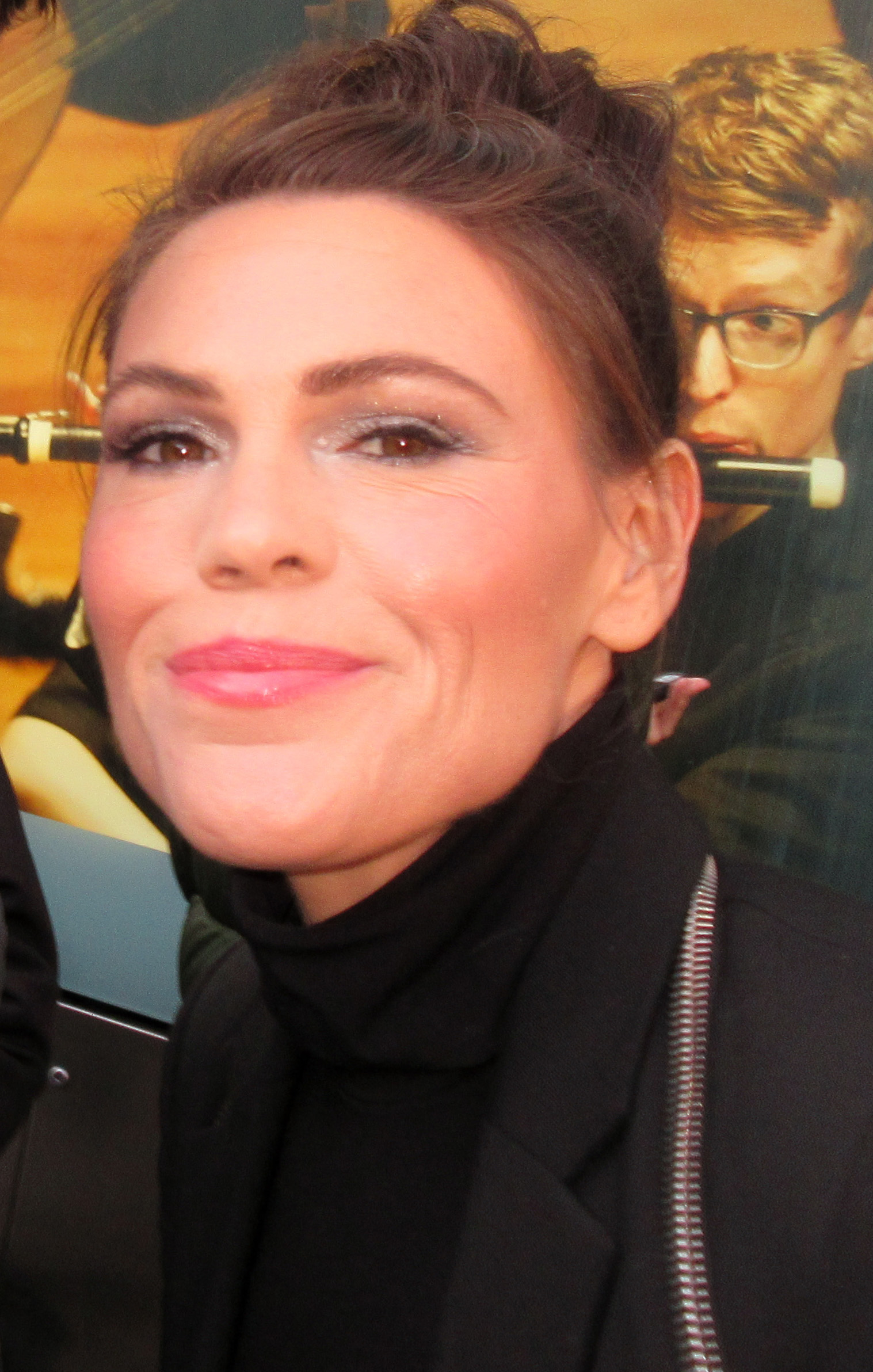
Clea DuVall

- September 1
  - Jerry Azumah, football player
  - Adrienne Wilkinson, actress
- September 2
  - Playa Fly, rapper
  - Sam Rivers, bassist for Limp Bizkit (d. 2025)
- September 3
  - DJ Envy, radio host
  - Jason Andersen, football player
- September 4
  - Ian Grushka, bassist for New Found Glory
  - Kia Stevens, wrestler and actress
  - Timothy "Yogi" Watts, drummer for Demon Hunter
- September 5 – Sin Cara, wrestler and luchador
- September 6 – N.O.R.E., rapper and podcaster
- September 7
  - Chinedu Achebe, football player
  - Molly Holly, wrestler
- September 9 – Soulja Slim, rapper (d. 2003)
- September 10 – Anita Allen, Army medic and Olympic pentathlete
- September 11
  - Jackie Buscarino, voice actress, writer and producer
  - Josette Bynum, wrestler
  - Ludacris, rapper and actor
- September 12 – 2 Chainz, rapper
- September 13
  - Brandt Andersen, activist, director, writer, and producer
  - Fiona Apple, singer
- September 15
  - Kenny Blank, actor and musician
  - Marisa Ramirez, actress
  - Jason Terry, basketball player
- September 16 – Musiq Soulchild, singer/songwriter
- September 17 – Andrea Anderson, Olympic sprinter
- September 18 – Sara Haines, television host
- September 19 – Erica Ash, actress, comedian, singer, and model
- September 21
  - Feda Almaliti, autistic activist (d. 2020)
  - Hank Fraley, football player
- September 23
  - Brent Abernathy, baseball player
  - Adam Gray, politician
  - Warren Kole, actor
- September 24
  - Elizabeth Bogush, actress
  - Kabeer Gbaja-Biamila, football player
- September 25
  - Clea DuVall, actress
  - Robbie Jones, actor
  - Joel David Moore, actor
- September 26 – Sirena Irwin, actress
- September 27 – Michael C. Maronna, actor
- September 29
  - Heath Bell, baseball player
  - Debelah Morgan, singer/songwriter

=== October ===
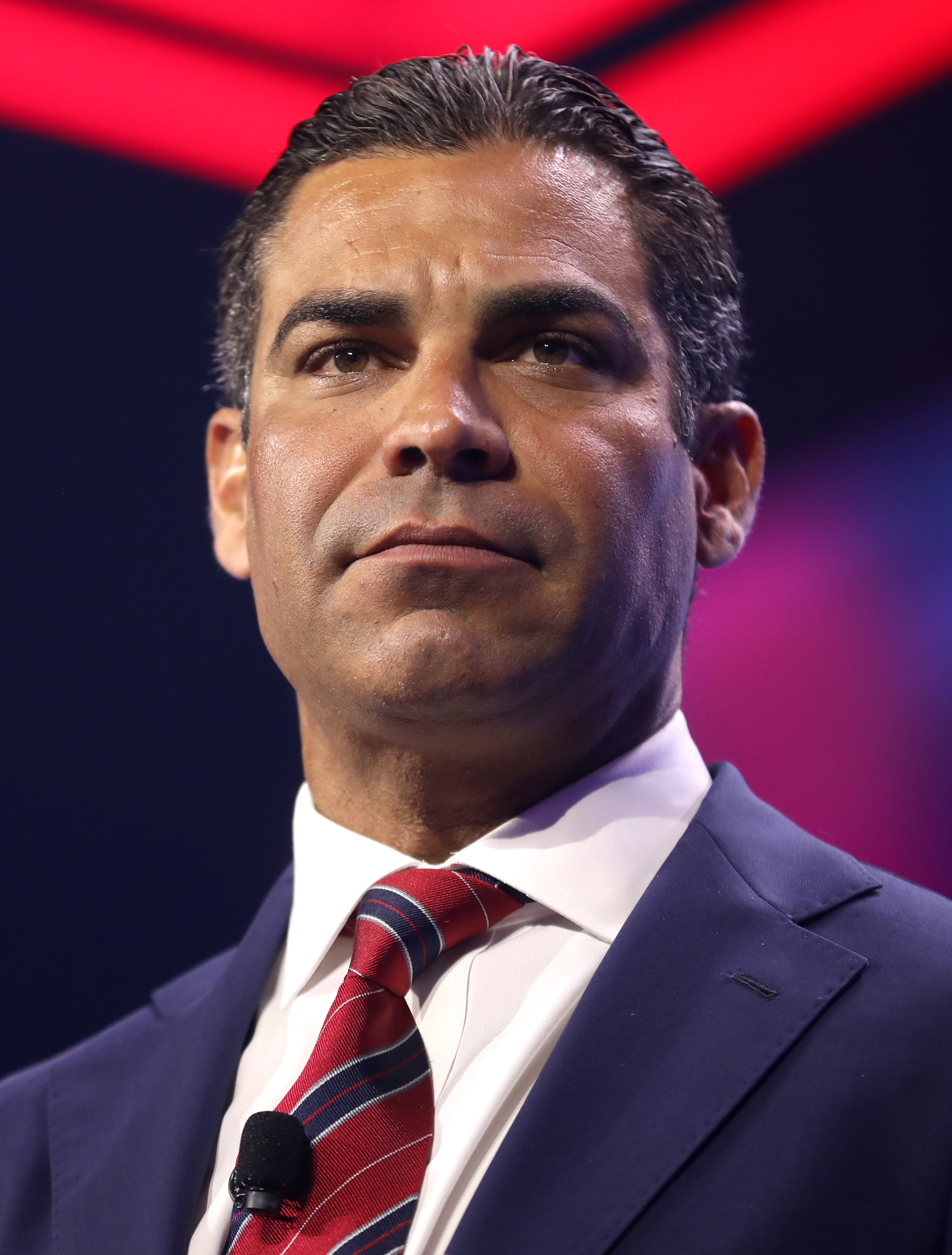
Francis Suarez

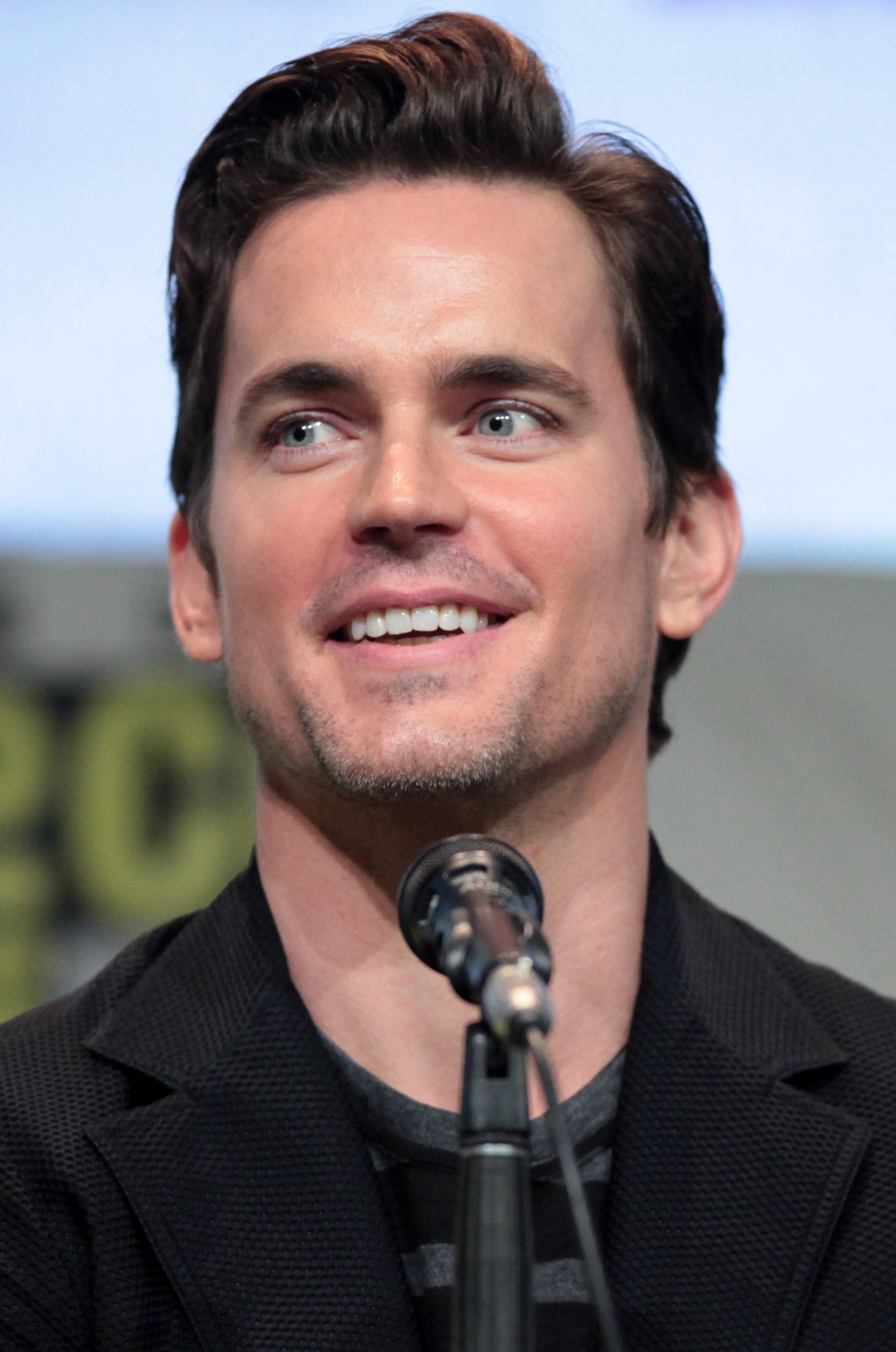
Matt Bomer

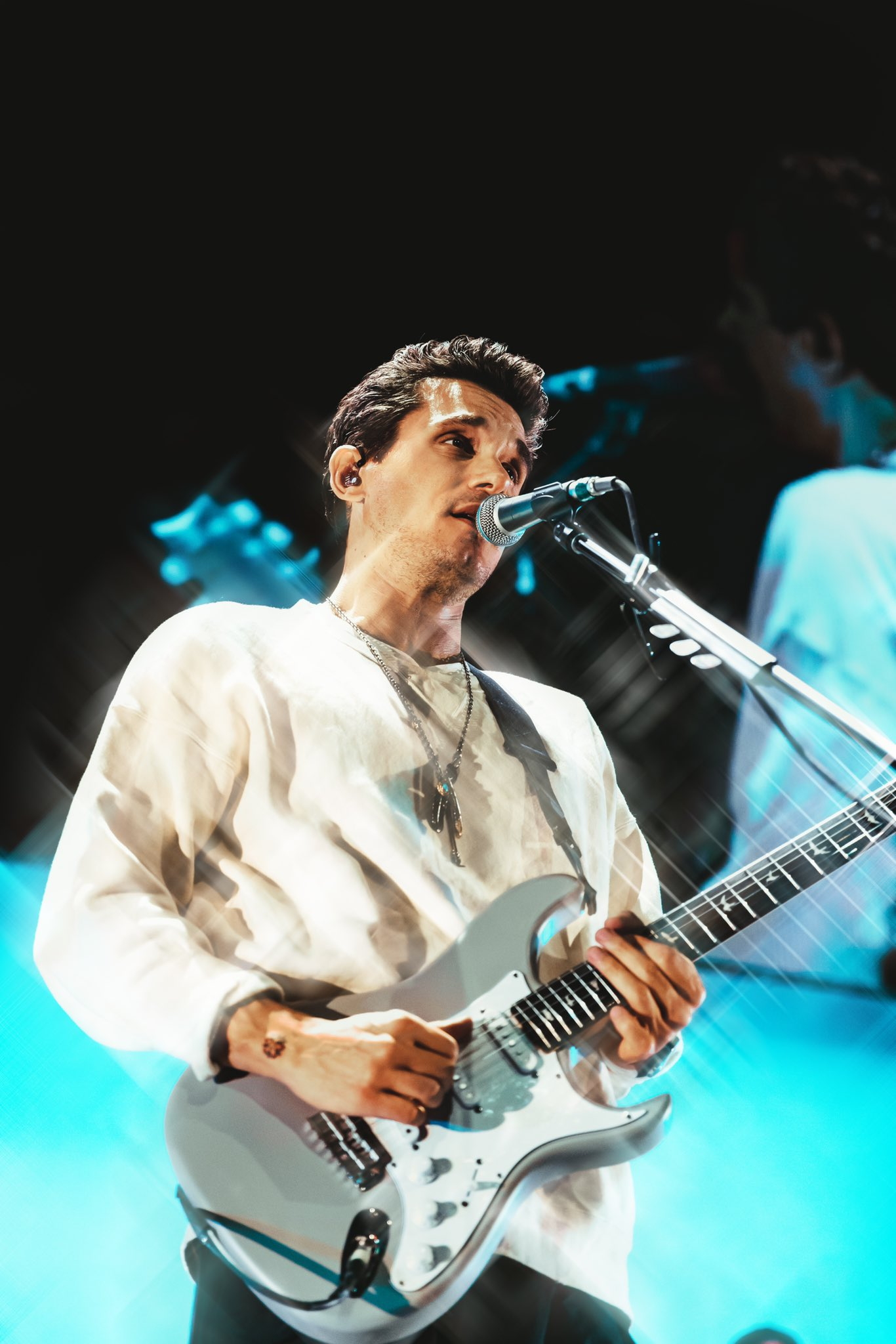
John Mayer

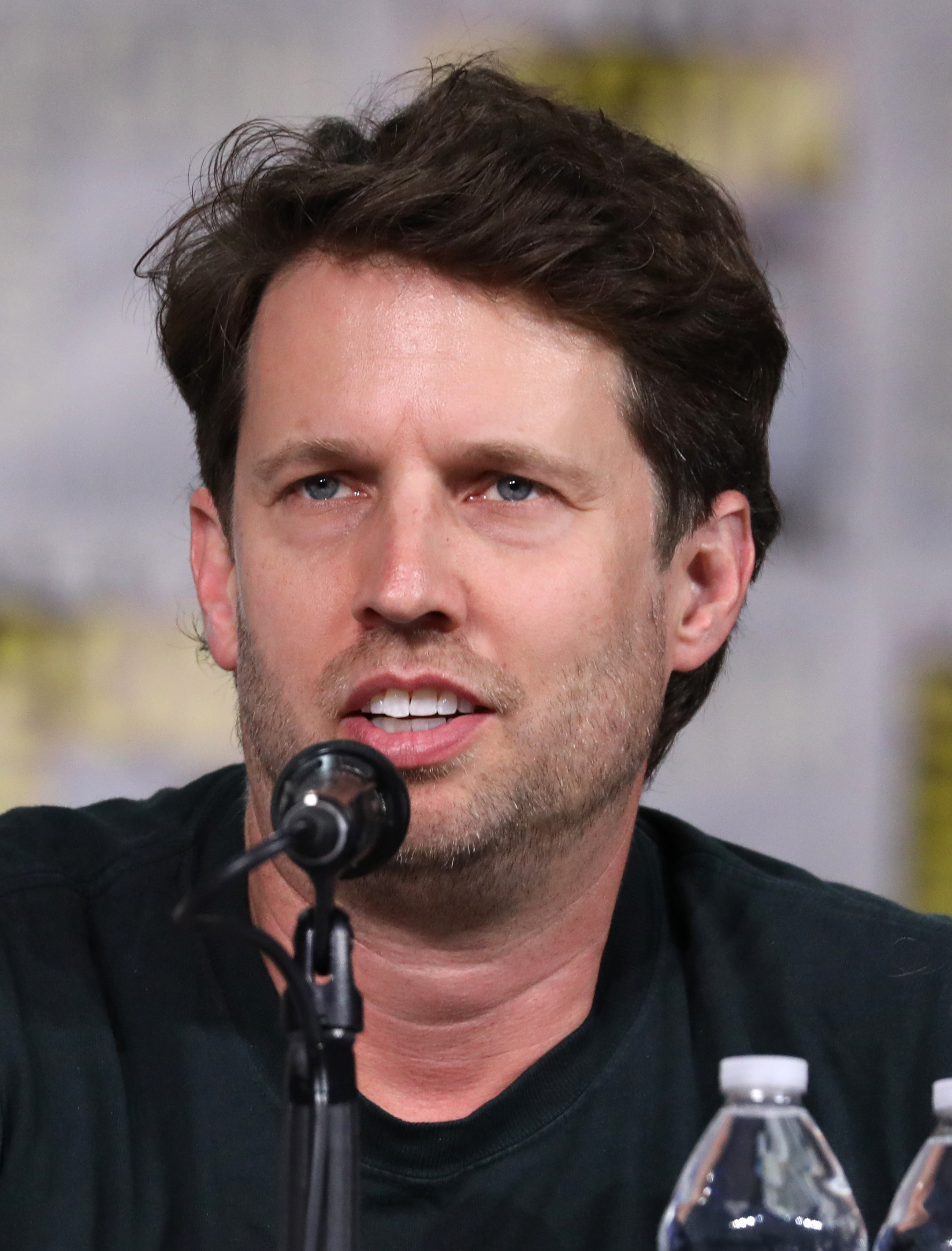
Jon Heder

- October 6
  - Melinda Doolittle, 3rd place finalist on American Idol (season 6)
  - Francis Suarez, politician, mayor of Miami, Florida (2017-present)
- October 10 – Tom Ashworth, football player
- October 11
  - Matt Bomer, actor
  - Rhett McLaughlin, youtuber
- October 12 – Bode Miller, Olympic skier
- October 13
  - Paul Pierce, basketball player
  - Quincy Carter, American football player
  - Kiele Sanchez, actress
- October 14
  - Jason Adasiewicz, vibraphonist and composer
  - Kelly Schumacher, American-born Canadian basketball and volleyball player
- October 15 – Jeff Sutphen, actor and producer
- October 16
  - John Mayer, singer/songwriter and record producer
  - Stephen Richards, singer and frontman for Taproot
- October 17
  - Alimi Ballard, actor
  - Bryan Bertino, filmmaker
- October 18
  - Chris McKenna, actor
  - Peter Sohn, animator, voice actor, storyboard artist, and film director
- October 20
  - Steve Anthony, wrestler
  - Jennifer Hall, actress
  - Sam Witwer, actor and musician
- October 21 – Nick Begich III, politician
- October 22 – Jocelyn Benson, politician
- October 23 – Matt Allen, football player
- October 25 – The Alchemist, record producer, DJ, rapper, and songwriter
- October 26 – Jon Heder, actor and voice actor
- October 27 – Mat Lucas, voice actor
- October 29 – Jon Abrahams, actor

=== November ===
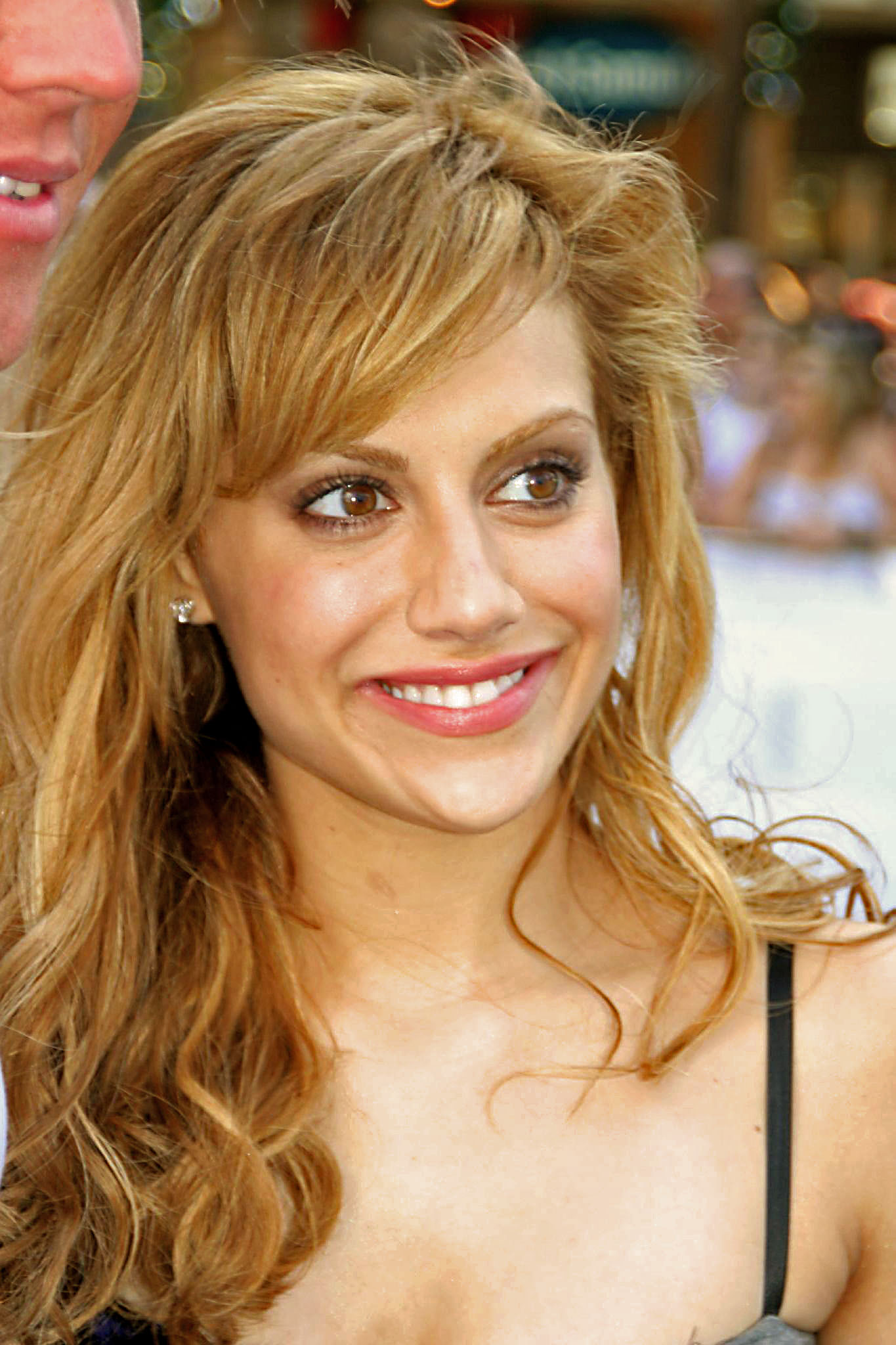
Brittany Murphy

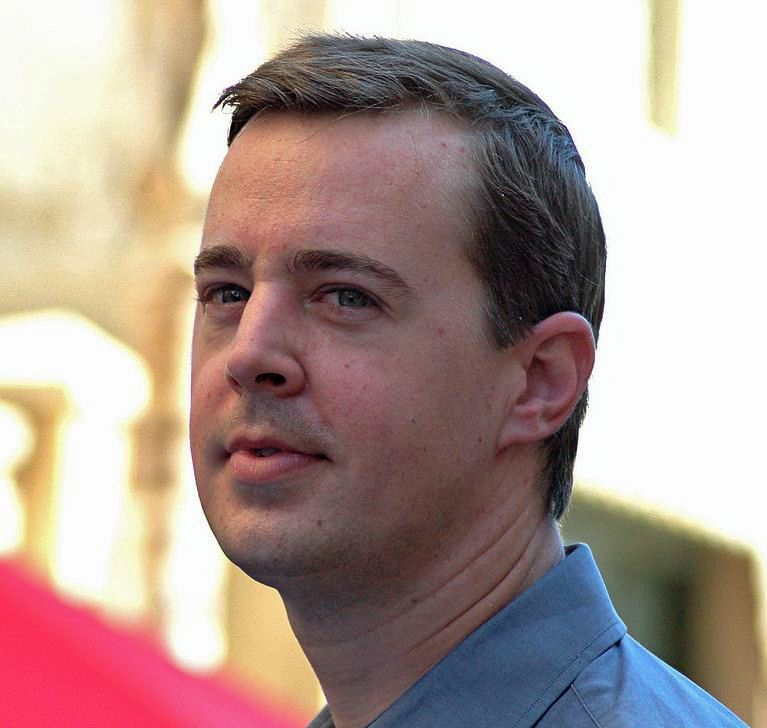
Sean Murray

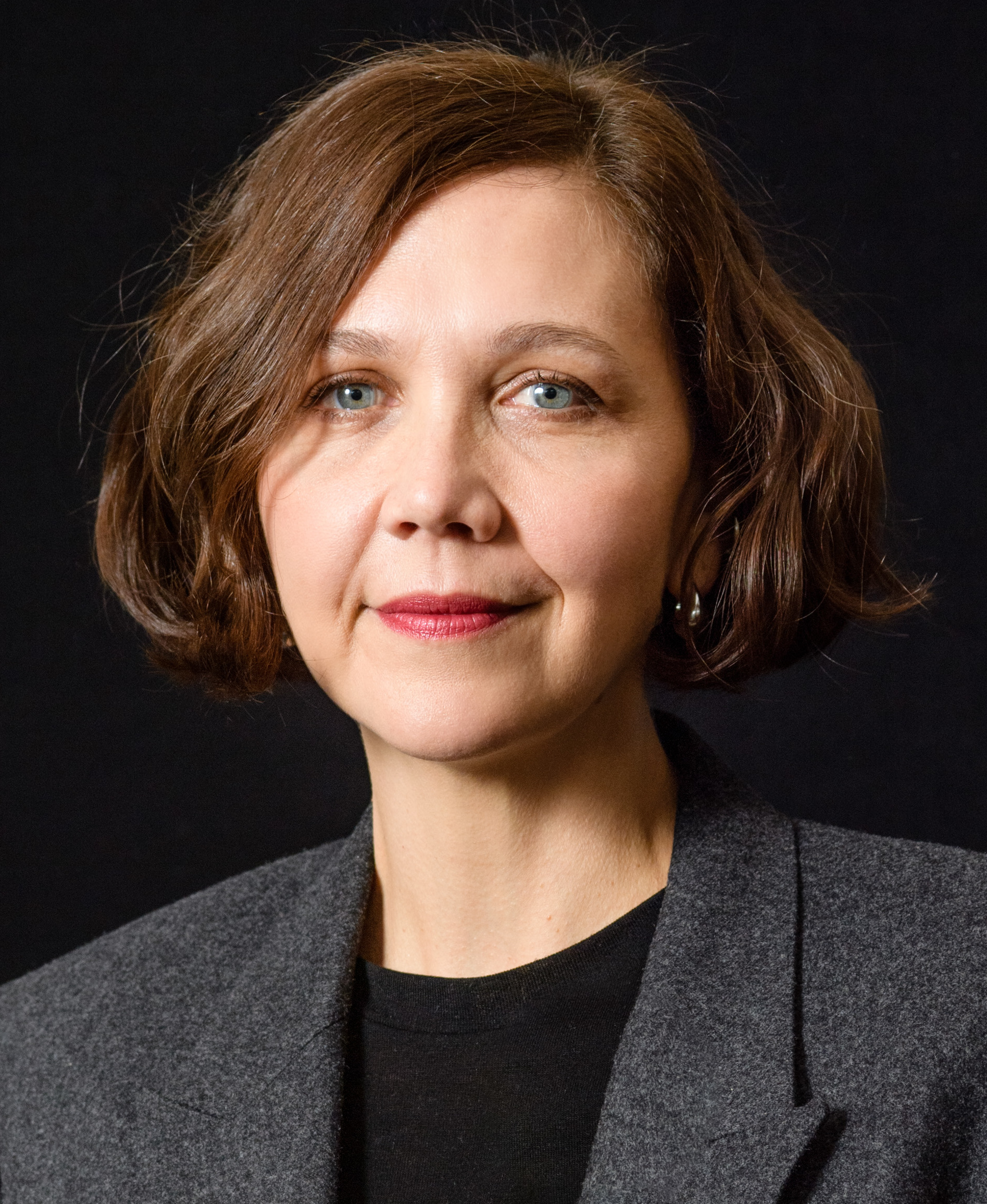
Maggie Gyllenhaal

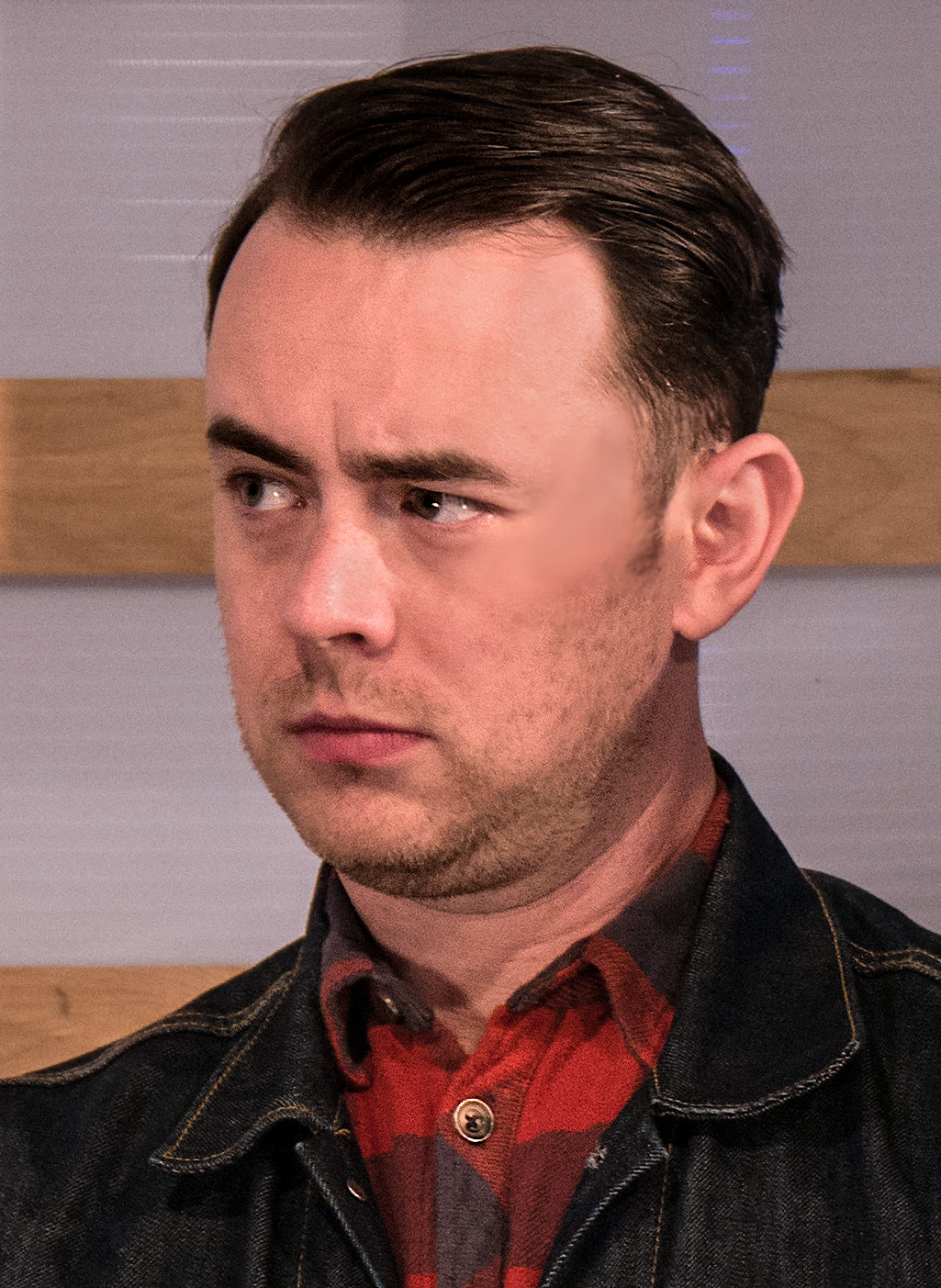
Colin Hanks

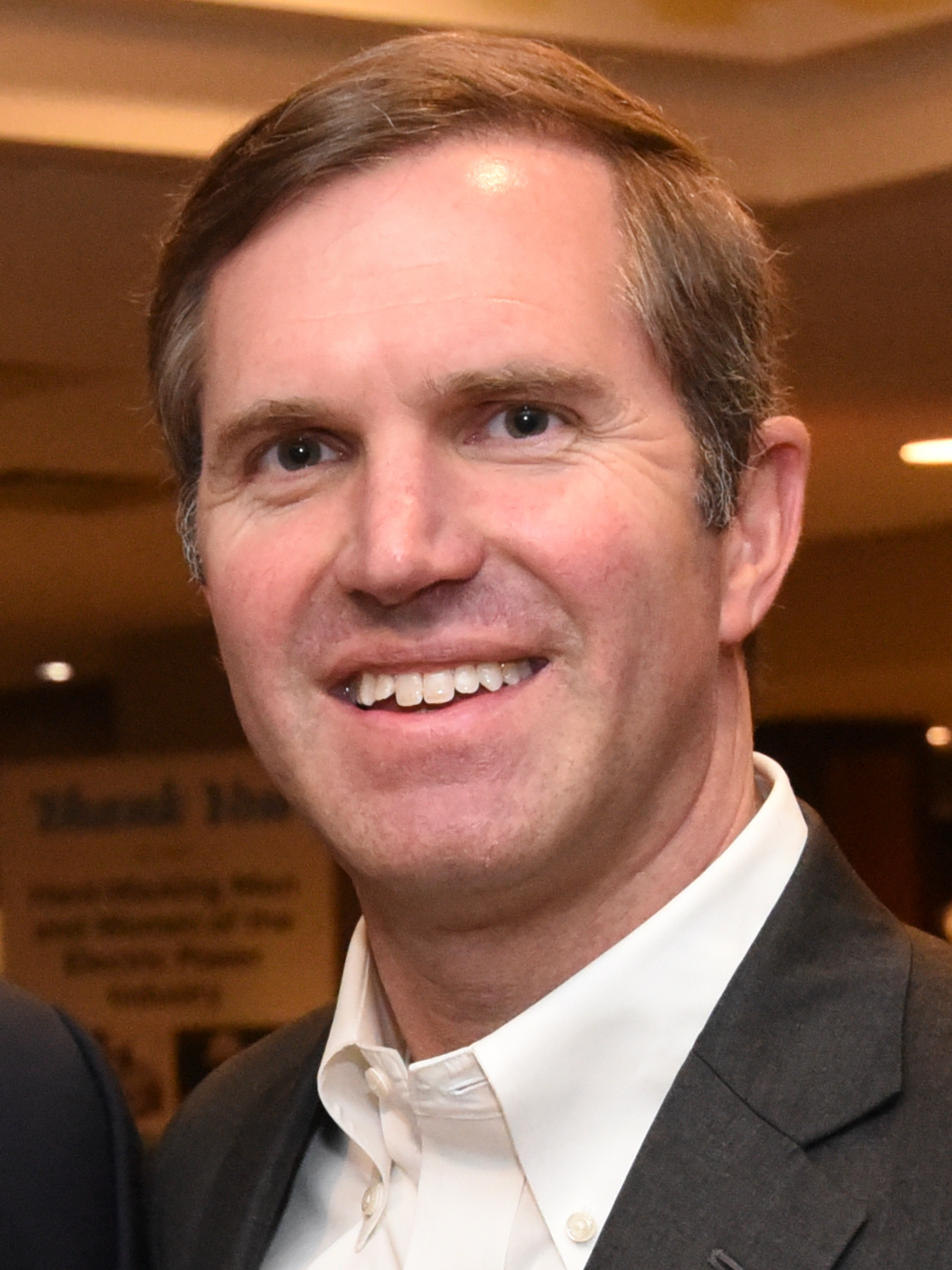
Andy Beshear

- November 2 – Randy Harrison, actor
- November 3
  - Philip Amelio, actor and teacher (d. 2005)
  - Greg Plitt, fitness model, actor, and former Army Ranger (d. 2015)
- November 4 – Larry Bigbie, baseball player
- November 5 – Sherry Argov, French-born author
- November 8
  - Bucky Covington, singer
  - Jill Dobson, journalist and beauty pageant titleholder
  - Nick Punto, baseball player
- November 10
  - Josh Barnett, mixed martial artist
  - Brittany Murphy, actress (d. 2009)
  - Lea Moreno Young, actress
- November 11 – Scoot McNairy, actor
- November 14 – Brian Dietzen, actor
- November 15
  - Jon Hurwitz, screenwriter, director, and producer
  - Sean Murray, actor
  - Robaire Smith, football player
  - Logan Whitehurst, singer/songwriter and drummer for The Velvet Teen (d. 2006)
- November 16 – Maggie Gyllenhaal, actress
- November 19
  - Reid Scott, actor
  - Markuann Smith, actor, producer, and director
  - Kerri Strug, Olympic gymnast
- November 20 – Josh Turner, country music singer
- November 21 – Jonas Jennings, football player
- November 22
  - David Clinger, road racing cyclist
  - Tim Keller, politician, mayor of Albuquerque, New Mexico (2019-present)
- November 23 – Lateef Crowder dos Santos, Brazilian-born actor, martial artist, and stuntman
- November 24 – Colin Hanks, actor
- November 25 – Jill Flint, actress
- November 27
  - Adam Archuleta, football player
  - Cheryl Bogart, music industry veteran and spinal cord injury awareness advocate
  - Veronica Portillo, television personality
  - Alex Wagner, journalist
- November 28 – DeMya Walker, basketball player
- November 29
  - Jason Alfaro, baseball player
  - Andy Beshear, politician, 63rd Governor of Kentucky
- November 30
  - Steve Aoki, DJ, record producer, music programmer, and record executive
  - Nelsan Ellis, actor and playwright (d. 2017)

=== December ===
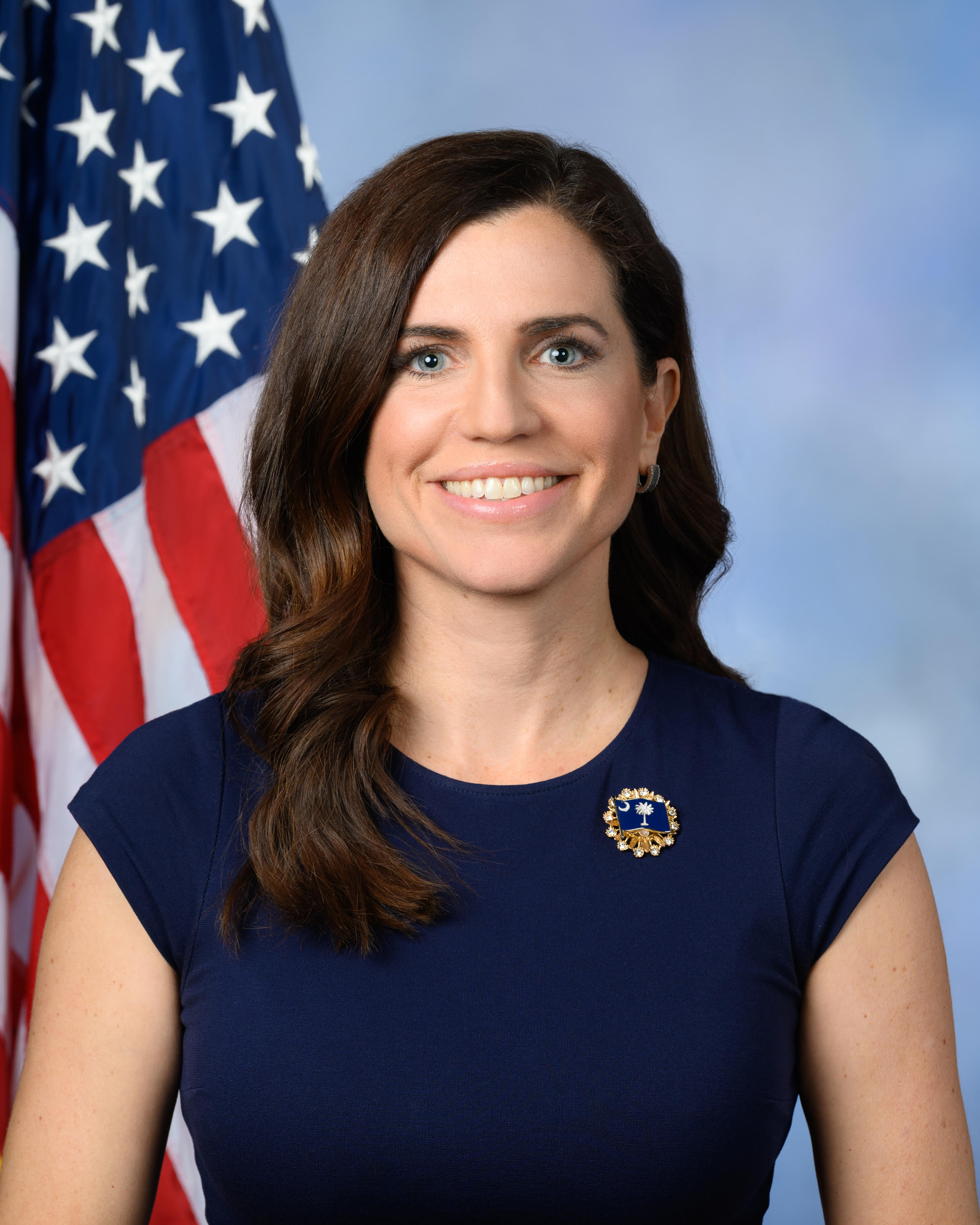
Nancy Mace

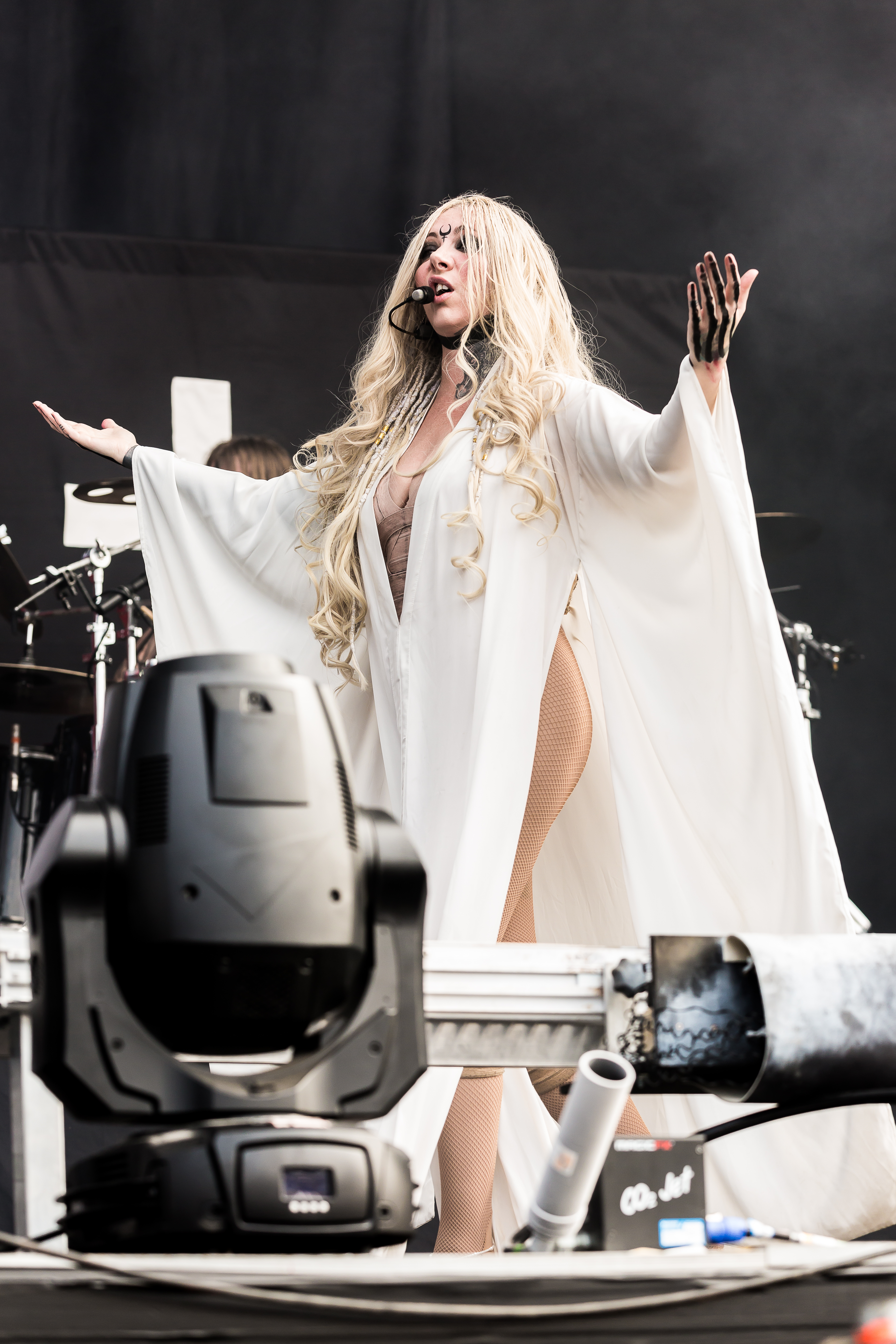
Maria Brink

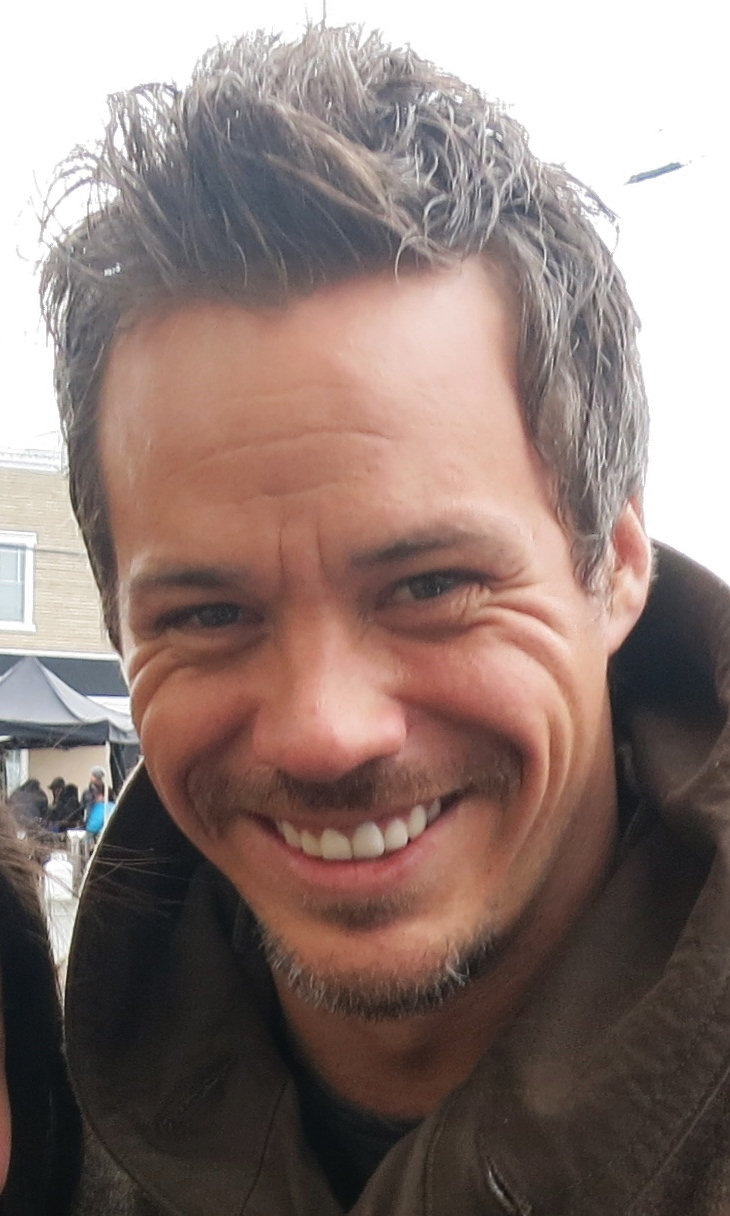
Michael Raymond-James

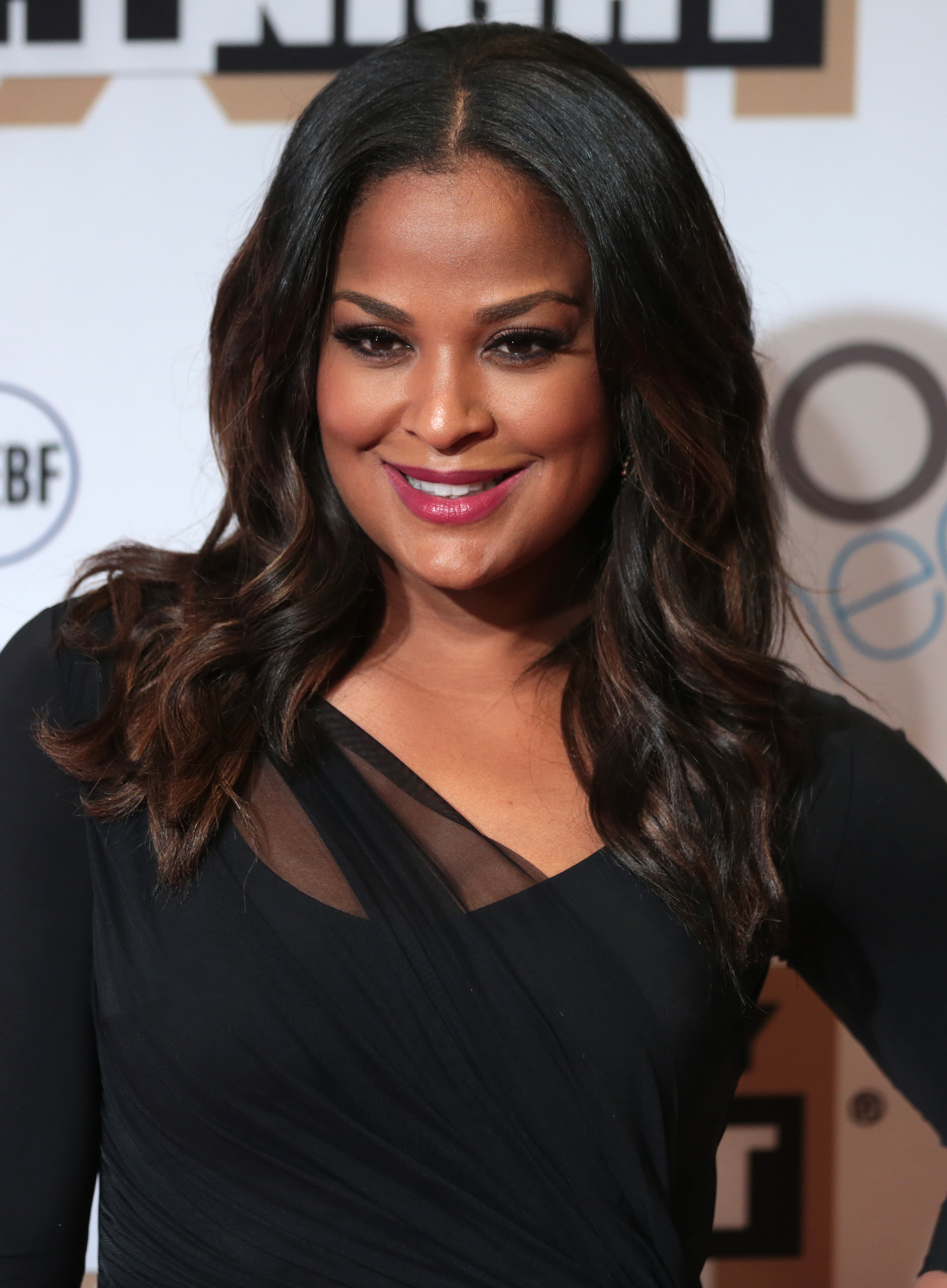
Laila Ali

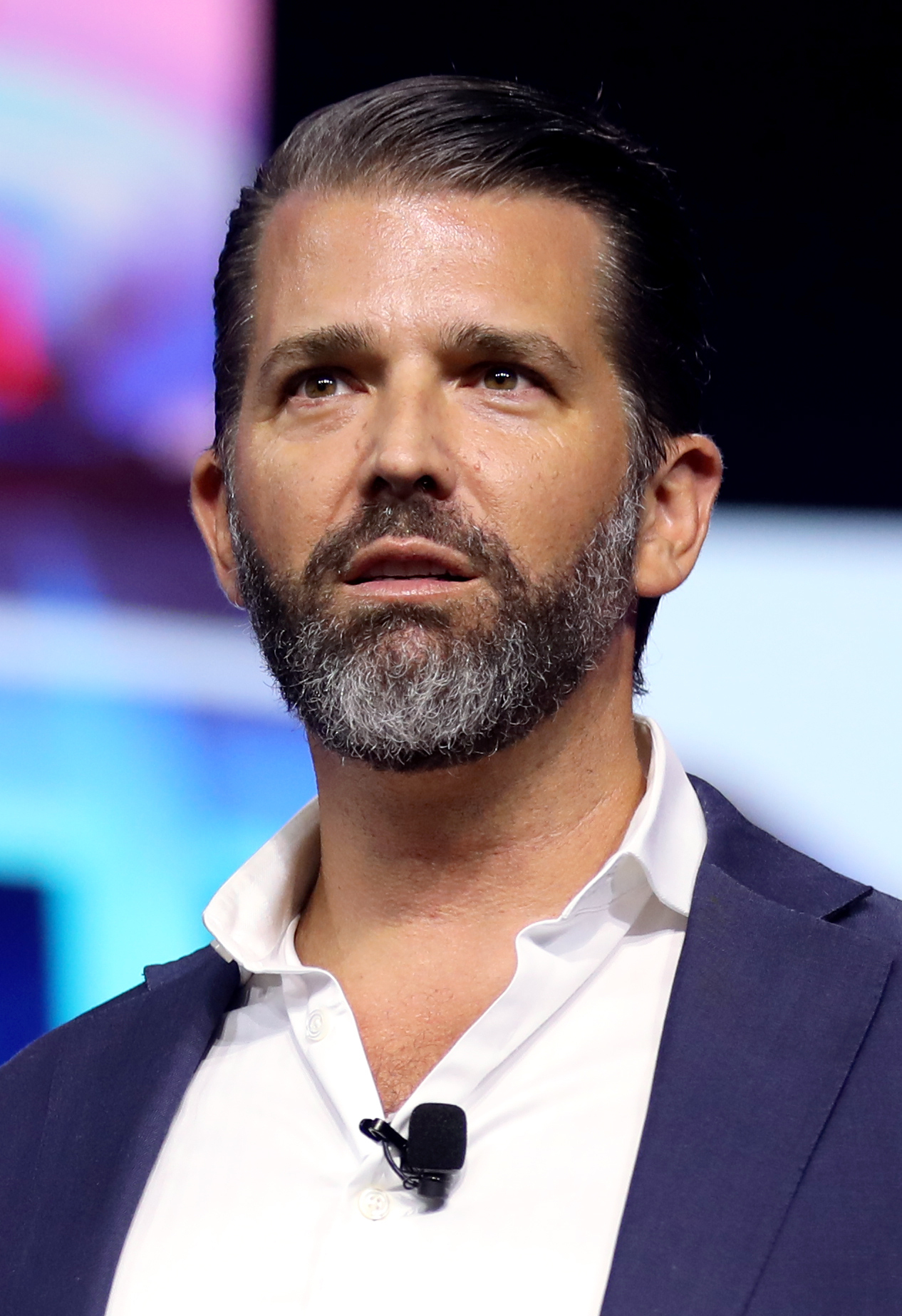
Donald Trump Jr.

- December 1
  - Brad Delson, lead guitarist for Linkin Park
  - Akiva Schaffer, writer, producer, director, comedian, actor, and rapper
- December 2
  - Sadie Alexandru, actress and model
  - Robert Garcia, politician
  - Lamin Swann, politician (d. 2023)
- December 3 – Troy Evans, football player
- December 4 – Nancy Mace, politician
- December 6
  - Edward Barbanell, actor and comedian
  - Lindsey Alley, actress and singer
- December 7
  - Chris Chalk, actor
  - Fernando Vargas, boxer
- December 8 – Ryan Newman, stock car racing driver
- December 10
  - Acid Betty, drag queen
  - Spencer Allen, baseball player and coach
- December 11 – Margaret Hoover, political commentator, strategist, author, and media personality
- December 12
  - Troy Andrew, football player
  - Orlando Hudson, baseball player
- December 13 – Nikki Fried, politician
- December 18
  - Maria Brink, singer and lead vocalist for In This Moment
  - Vanessa Trump, model
- December 21
  - Michel Abboud, Lebanese-born artist and architect
  - A. J. Bowen, actor and producer
  - Mark Dice, author and conspiracy theorist
  - Colombe Jacobsen-Derstine, actress and chef
  - Kevin Miller, voice actor
  - Gregory Siff, visual artist, designer, writer and actor
- December 22
  - Dai Andrews, performance artist
  - Michael Watson, politician
- December 23 – Alge Crumpler, American football player
- December 24 – Michael Raymond-James, actor
- December 27 – Erin Aldrich, Olympic high jumper and volleyball player
- December 28
  - John Jairo Bedoya Jr., wrestler (d. 2020)
  - Michael Spears, actor
- December 29
  - Laveranues Coles, American football player
  - Katherine Moennig, actress
- December 30
  - Jimmy Alapag, basketball player
  - Laila Ali, boxer
  - Aesha Ash, ballerina
  - Kenyon Martin, basketball player
- December 31 – Donald Trump Jr., businessman and TV personality, son of Donald Trump

=== Full date unknown ===
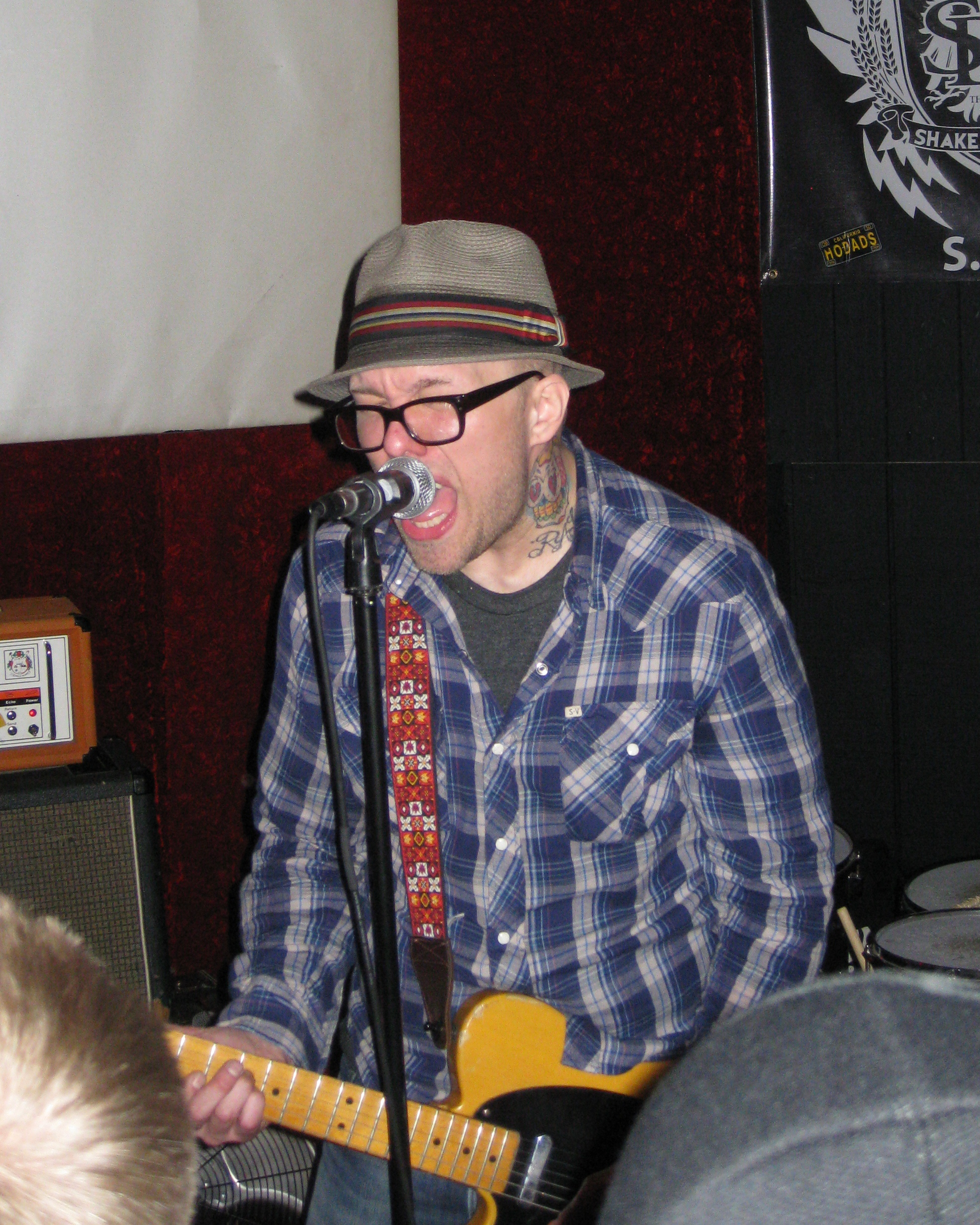
Kris Roe

- Faisal Alam, gay rights activist
- Cecilia Alemani, Italian-born curator
- Kate Ali, artist
- Hannah Allam, journalist and reporter
- Francis Allen-Palenske, businessman and politician
- Charles Allen, politician
- Paul Coy Allen, filmmaker, producer, and director
- Ilkay Altintas, Turkish-born data and computer scientist
- Bill Anderson, politician
- Holly Andres, photographer
- George Arison, Georgian-born businessman
- Brad Ascalon, industrial designer
- Joe Asselin, blues musician
- Amanda Auchter, writer, professor, and editor
- Walead Beshty, British-born artist and writer
- Nona Faustine, photographer and visual artist (d. 2025)
- Scott Neustadter, screenwriter and producer
- Kris Roe, singer/songwriter, guitarist, and frontman for The Ataris
- Erica Tazel, actress
- Shanequa Gay, visual artist and activist

== Deaths ==
=== January ===
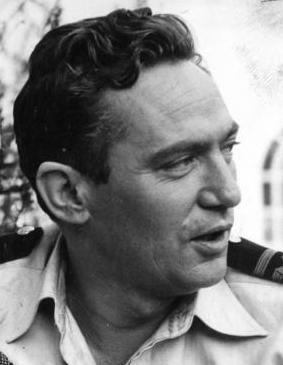
Peter Finch

- January 2 – Erroll Garner, jazz pianist (b. 1921)
- January 5 – Onslow Stevens, American actor (b. 1902)
- January 6 – William Gropper, American artist (b. 1897)
- January 10 – Ruth Graves Wakefield, chef (b. 1903)
- January 14 – Peter Finch, English-born actor (b. 1916)
- January 17 – Gary Gilmore, criminal (b. 1940)
- January 23 – Toots Shor, American restaurateur and proprietor (b. 1903)
- January 28 – Burt Mustin, American actor (b. 1884)
- January 29 – Freddie Prinze, actor and comedian (b. 1954)

=== February ===
- February 3 – Pauline Starke, American actress (b. 1901)
- February 4 – Brett Halliday, mystery writer (b. 1904)
- February 12 – Henry Jordan, American football player and member of the Pro Football Hall of Fame (b. 1935)
- February 17 – Quincy Howe, American journalist (b. 1900)
- February 18 – Andy Devine, actor (b. 1905)
- February 20 – Ralph Hungerford, American naval officer, 33rd Governor of American Samoa (b. 1896)
- February 21 – John Hubley, American animator (b. 1914)
- February 24 – Milt Kamen, comedian and actor (b. 1921)
- February 27 – Allison Hayes, American actress (b. 1930)
- February 28 – Eddie "Rochester" Anderson (b. 1905)

=== March ===
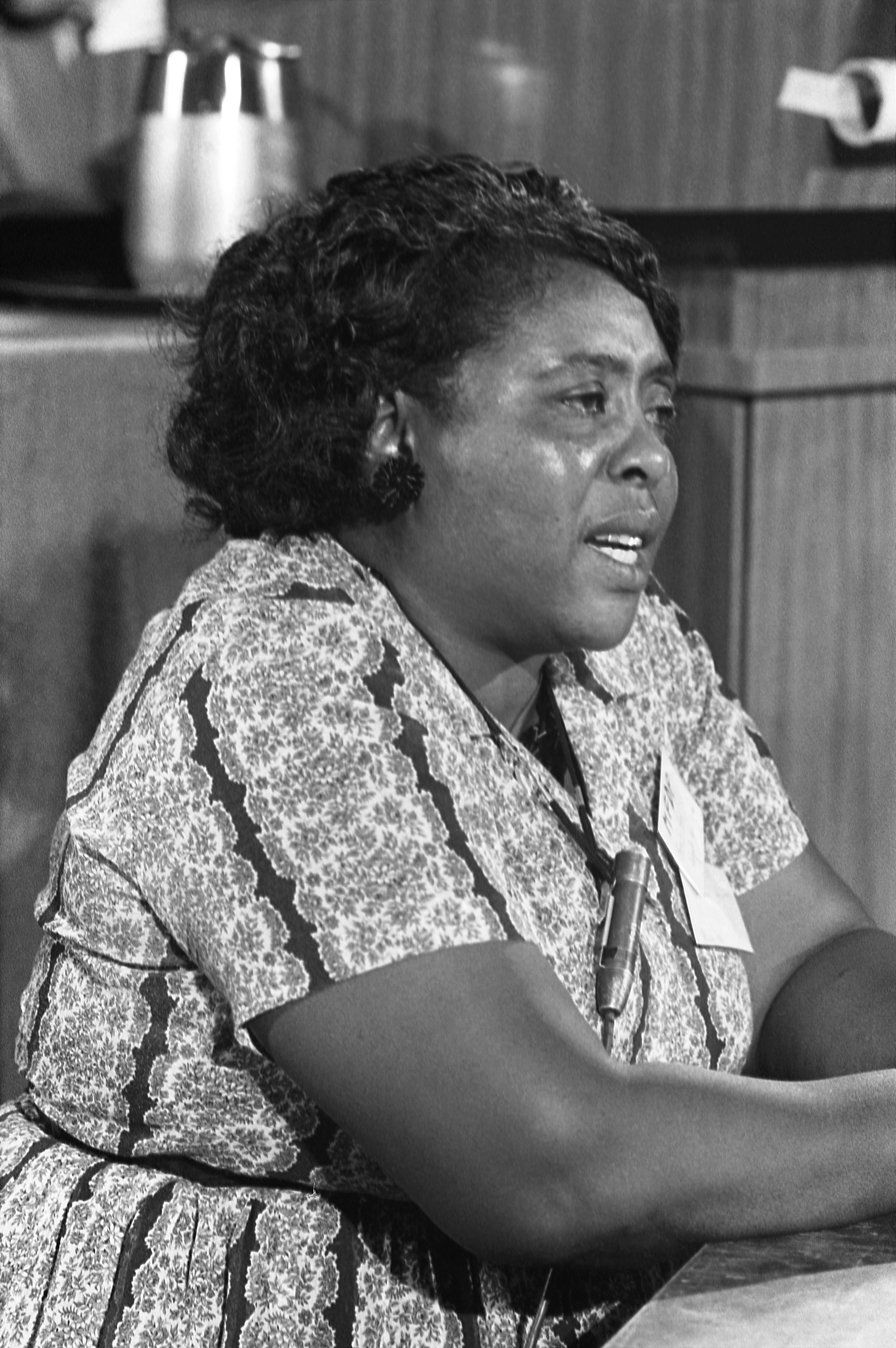
Fannie Lou Hamer

- March 3 – Percy Marmont, American actor (b. 1883)
- March 8 – Henry Hull, American actor (b. 1890)
- March 10 – E. Power Biggs, English-American organist (b. 1906)
- March 11 – Ulysses S. Grant IV, American geologist and paleontologist (b. 1893)
- March 14 – Fannie Lou Hamer, American civil rights activist (b. 1917)
- March 15 – Antonino Rocca, Italian and Argentinian professional wrestler (b. 1921)
- March 19 – William L. Laurence, Jewish Lithuanian-American journalist (b. 1888)
- March 27 – Diana Heyland, American actress (b. 1936)
- March 29 – Charles Nicoletti, American gangster (b. 1916)

=== April ===
- April 12 – Philip K. Wrigley, business and sports executive (b. 1894)
- April 20 – Wilmer Allison, tennis player (b. 1904)
- April 21 – Gummo Marx, vaudeville performer (b. 1893)
- April 23 – Charles D. Herron, United States Army general (b. 1877)
- April 27 – Stanley Adams, actor and screenwriter (b. 1915)

=== May ===
- May 9 – James Jones, author (b. 1921)
- May 10 – Joan Crawford, actress (b. 1904)
- May 30 – Paul Desmond, jazz saxophonist and composer (b. 1924)
- May 31 – William Castle, film director, producer, and screenwriter (b. 1914)

=== June ===
- June 2
  - Stephen Boyd, Northern Irish actor (b. 1931)
  - Forrest Lewis, actor (b. 1899)
- June 13 – Tom C. Clark, lawyer and politician (b. 1899)
- June 14 – Alan Reed, actor (b. 1907)
- June 16 – Wernher von Braun, German, later American, aerospace engineer and space architect (b. 1912 in Germany)
- June 26 – J. Walter Kennedy, NBA commissioner (b. 1912)

=== July ===
- July 9 – Alice Paul, suffragist (b. 1885)
- July 29 – David Lochary, actor (b. 1944)

=== August ===
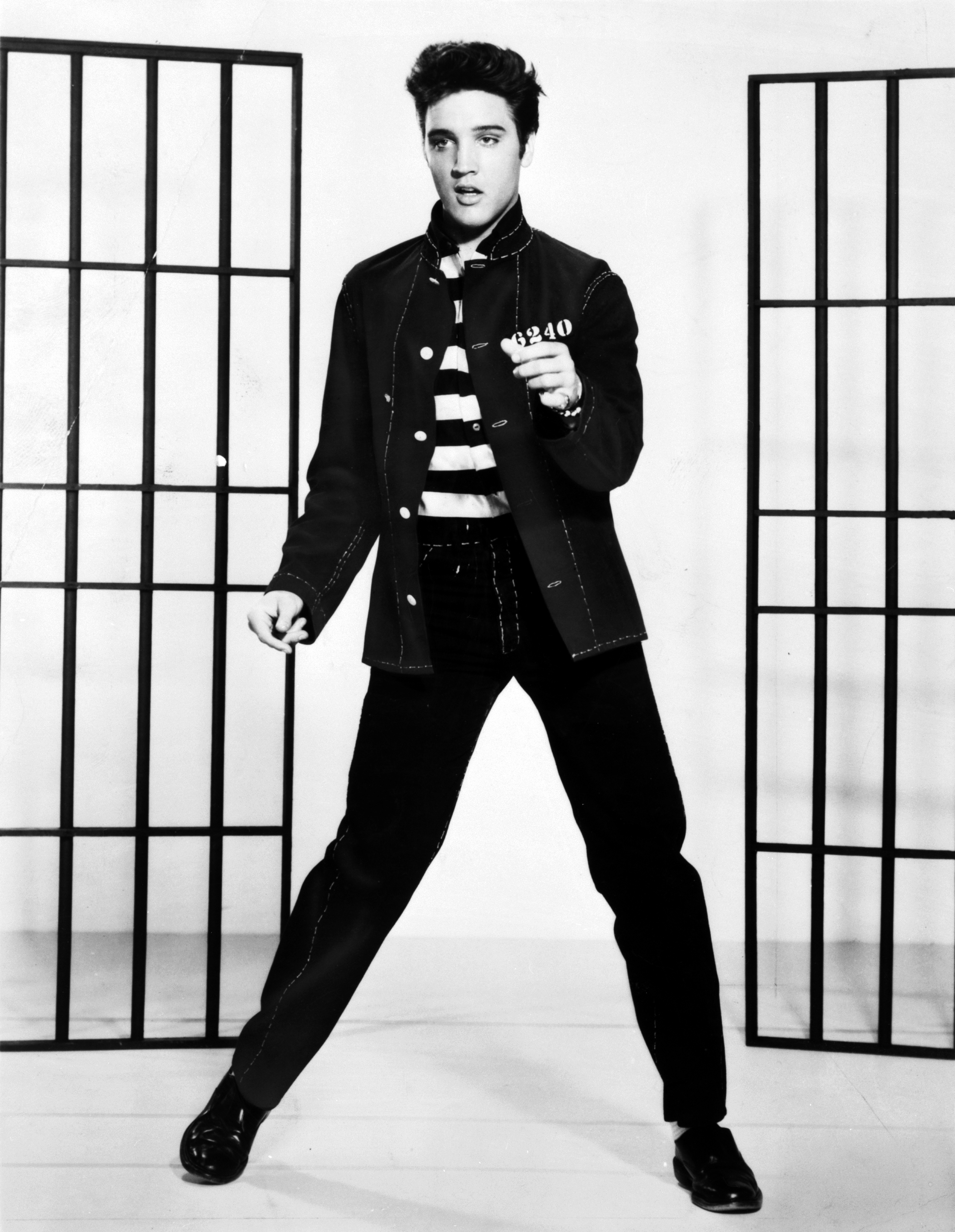
Elvis Presley

- August 1 – Francis Gary Powers, American U-2 spy plane pilot (b. 1929)
- August 3 – Alfred Lunt, American actor (b. 1892)
- August 5 – Waldo L. Schmitt, American biologist (b. 1887)
- August 9 – George Kenney, World War II United States Army Air Forces general (b. 1889)
- August 10 – Vince Barnett, American actor (b. 1902)
- August 14 – Ron Haydock, American actor (b. 1940)
- August 16 – Elvis Presley, American actor, musician and singer-songwriter (b. 1935)
- August 17 – Delmer Daves, American screenwriter and director (b. 1904)
- August 19 – Groucho Marx, American actor and comedian (b. 1890)
- August 22 – Sebastian Cabot, English actor (b. 1918)
- August 29 – Jean Hagen, American actress (b. 1923)

=== September ===
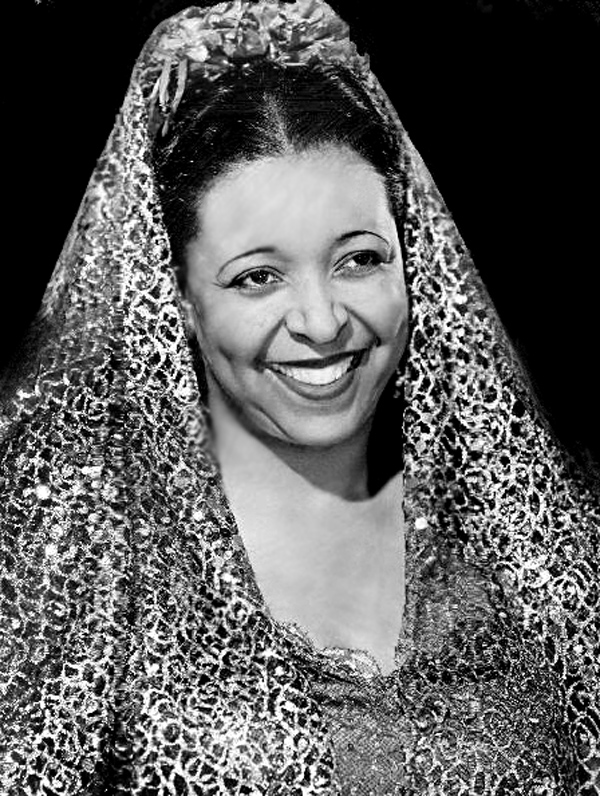
Ethel Waters

- September 1 – Ethel Waters, American singer and actress (b. 1896)
- September 2 – Stephen Dunne, American actor (b. 1911)
- September 8 – Zero Mostel, American actor (b. 1915)
- September 13 – Leopold Stokowski, British-born American conductor (b. 1882)
- September 16 – Maria Callas, Greek soprano (b. 1923)
- September 24
  - Sherm Lollar, American baseball player and coach (b. 1924)
  - Frederick Merk, American historian (b. 1887)
- September 26 – Ernie Lombardi American baseball player and member of the MLB Hall of Fame (b. 1908)
- September 29 – Robert McKimson, American animator and director (b. 1910)
- September 30 – Mary Ford, guitarist and vocalist (b. 1924)

=== October ===
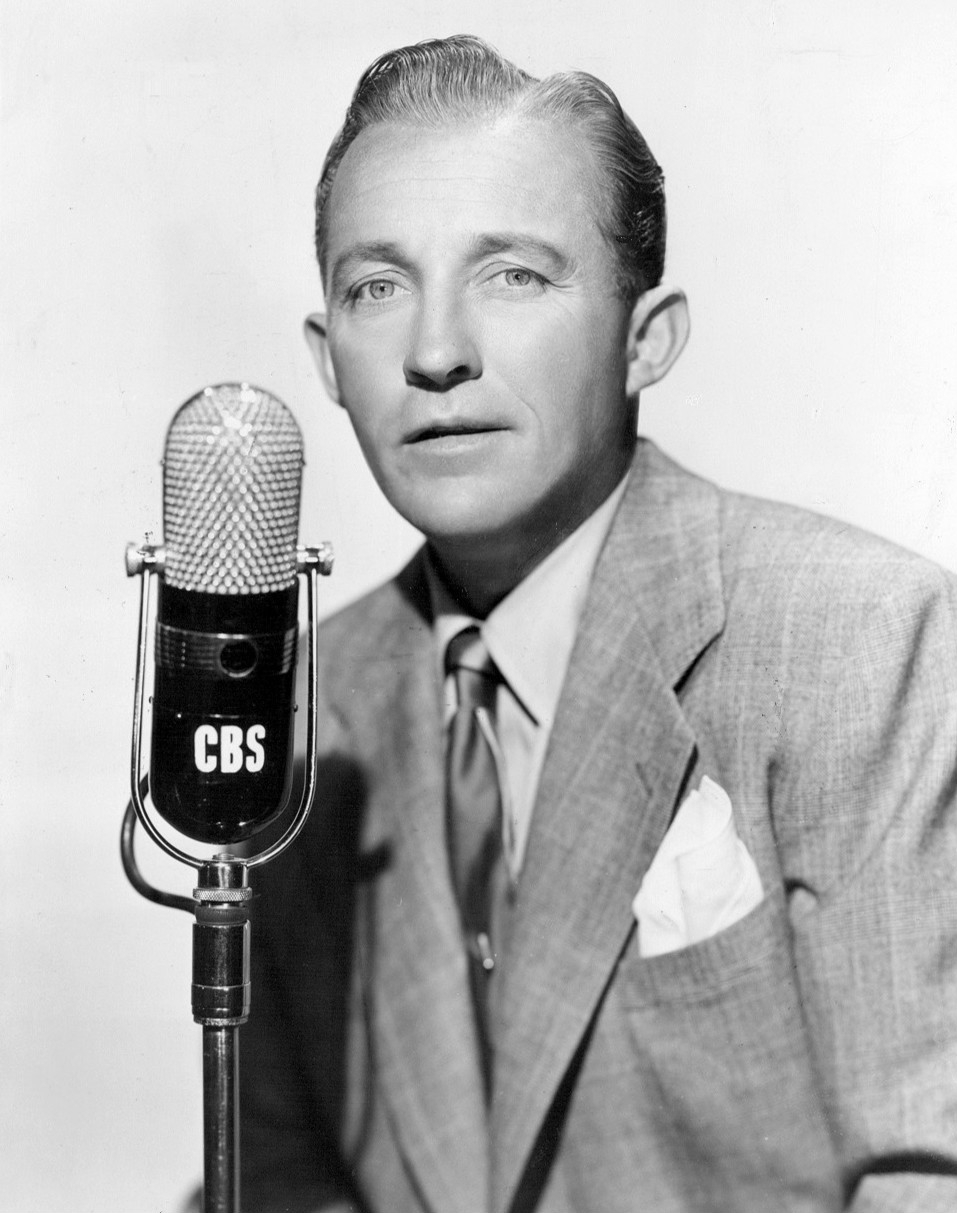
Bing Crosby

- October 2 – Joseph William Woodrough, American federal judge (b. 1873)
- October 3 – Tay Garnett, American film director (b. 1894)
- October 5 – Jan Garber, American jazz bandleader (b. 1894)
- October 6 – Danny Greene, Irish American mobster (b. 1933)
- October 8 – Joe Greenstein, Polish-born American strongman (b. 1893)
- October 11 – MacKinlay Kantor, American writer, Pulitzer Prize winner (b. 1904)
- October 12 – Dorothy Davenport, American actress (b. 1895)
- October 14 – Bing Crosby, American pop singer and actor (b. 1903)
- October 16 – Milt Raskin, American swing jazz pianist (b. 1916).
- October 20 – Three members of American rock group, Lynyrd Skynyrd, killed in plane crash:
  - Ronnie Van Zant, lead singer (b. 1948)
  - Cassie Gaines, lead singer (b. 1948)
  - Steve Gaines, lead singer and guitarist (b. 1949)
- October 27 – James M. Cain, American writer (b. 1892)

=== November ===
- November 3 – Florence Vidor, silent film actress (b. 1895)
- November 5 – Guy Lombardo, bandleader (b. 1902 in Canada)
- November 8 – Bucky Harris, baseball player and manager (b. 1896)
- November 9 – Gertrude Astor, film character actress (b. 1887)
- November 16 – José Acosta, baseball starting pitcher (b. 1891)
- November 21 – Richard Carlson, actor and screen director (b. 1912)

=== December ===
- December 4 – Leila Hyams, actress (b. 1905)
- December 5 – Rahsaan Roland Kirk, American jazz multi-instrumentalist (b. 1935)
- December 7 – Peter Carl Goldmark, Hungarian-American engineer (b. 1906)
- December 10 – Ethel Roosevelt Derby, youngest daughter of Theodore Roosevelt (b. 1891)
- December 15 – Wilfred Kitching, 7th General of the Salvation Army (b. 1893)
- December 19 – Nellie Tayloe Ross, 13th governor of Wyoming from 1925 to 1927 and director of the United States Mint from 1933 to 1953; first female state governor in the U.S. (b. 1876)
- December 25 – Charlie Chaplin, British-born actor (b. 1889)
- December 26 – Howard Hawks, film director, producer, and screenwriter (b. 1896)

== See also ==
- 1977 in American soccer
- 1977 in American television
- List of American films of 1977
- Timeline of United States history (1970–1989)
