= List of Native American podcasts =

List of podcasts by or about indigenous peoples of the Americas

The following is a list of Native American podcasts that are either created by or about indigenous peoples of the Americas.

== List ==
Podcast	Year	Starring, Narrator(s), or Host(s)	Produced by	Ref
Coffee with Ma	2018–present	Kaniehtiio Horn	Independent	
Toasted Sister	2017–present	Andi Murphy	Koahnic Broadcast Corporation and Native Voice One	
This Place	2021	Rosanna Deerchild	CBC Radio	
Telling Our Twisted Histories	2021–present	Kaniehti:io Horn	CBC Podcasts	
MediaINDIGENA	2016–present	Rick Harp	Independent	
Warrior Life	2018–present	Pamela Palmater	Independent	
All My Relations	2019–present	Matika Wilbur, Desi Small-Rodriguez & Adrienne Keene	Independent	
Métis in Space	2014–present	Molly Swain & Chelsea Vowel	Indian & Cowboy	
Missing & Murdered	2016–present	Connie Walker	CBC Podcasts	
Vanished: A Native American Epidemic	2020–present	Diane Cassanova	KHQ-TV	
The Cuts	2015–present	Sterlin Harjo	Indian & Cowboy	
New Books in Native American Studies	2010–present		New Books Network	
Red Man Laughing	2011–present	Ryan McMahon	Indian & Cowboy	
Native Trailblazers	2014–2020	Vincent Schilling and Delores Schilling	Independent	
Native America Calling	2021–present		Koahnic Broadcast Corporation and Native Voice One	
Storykeepers	2021–present	Waubgeshig Rice and Jennifer David	Independent	
Thunder Bay	2018–present	Ryan McMahon	Canadaland	
The Red Nation Podcast	2020–present	Nick Estes and Jen Marley	Independent	
Unreserved	2014–present	Rosanna Deerchild and Falen Johnson	CBC Radio One	
Our Native Land	2020–present	Tchadas Leo	CHEK Podcasts	
This Land	2019–present	Rebecca Nagle	Crooked Media	
In Your Ears for 50 Years	2021-2021		KYUK, Public Media for Alaska's Yukon-Kuskokwim Delta	
National Native News	1987 (on radio)-present		Koahnic Broadcast Corporation and Native Voice One	
The Henceforward	2016–2020			
Matriarch Movement		Shayla Stonechild		
New Fire with Lisa Charleyboy	?-2017	Lisa Charleyboy		
Stolen	2021-2021	Connie Walker	Gimlet	
Tohono O'odham Young Voices	2016–present	Tina Andrew		
Breakdances with Wolves: Indigenous Pirate Radio		Gyasi Ross, Wesley Roach, and Minty LongEarth		
Still Here	2016–2017	Jenni Monet		
A Tribe Called Geek		Johnnie Jae Morris and Jack Malstrom		
Native Talk Radio Program		Cliff and Brandon Horrell		
Native Comic Book Society Podcast		James Simermeyer, Nez Evans, Adamm Martinez, Rodrigo Rodriguez, Lee Francis IV, and Paul Richard Rodriguez		
Geek Savz		Eli Funaro, Isaiah Mahto, Travis Bush, and Anthony Columbus		

== See also ==
- Indigenous music of North America
- Native Americans in film
- Native American fashion
- Indigenous cuisine of the Americas
- List of Indigenous newspapers in North America
