= Jaeah Lee =

Investigative journalist

- Alma mater: New York University
- Occupation: Journalist
- Employer: Mother Jones
- Awards: American Mosaic Journalism Prize (2018)

Jaeah Lee is an independent American journalist who writes primarily about justice, race, and labor in America. She is the recipient of the inaugural American Mosaic Journalism Prize, the 2018 Los Angeles Literary Award and was a Knight-Wallace Reporting Fellow at the University of Michigan. Her reporting work on the racial bias of using rap lyrics as evidence in criminal prosecutions has drawn attention to the acknowledgement of rap as protected speech under the First Amendment, particularly in California.

She has been published by major American publications including California Sunday Magazine, VICE News, The Atlantic, The Guardian, Wired, Christian Science Monitor, Global Post, MSNBC, and Democracy Now! She also worked as a staff reporter for Mother Jones Magazine.

== Early life ==
Lee earned her bachelor's degree from New York University in 2007.

== Career ==
The New York Times has described Lee as "a magazine journalist based in San Francisco, with a focus on criminal justice." Her work has been published by The Guardian, The Atlantic, Vice News, and The New York Times Magazine among other prominent publications, and often deals with issues of race and justice. One of her most notable pieces was the result of following the mother of a victim of police shooting for 17 months (December 2015 to August 2017), and won the 2018 PEN America Los Angeles Literary Award for Journalism.

Other examples of her work include a piece for the New York Times Magazine which covered the murder of Vicha Ratanapakdee, who was a victim of racial violence in San Francisco, and a piece about "a thirty-one-year-old reporter for the East Bay Times" who covers the courts beat.

Lee also worked as a reporter at magazine Mother Jones, "where she wrote about criminal justice, and income and racial inequality, among other subjects." Lee's 2022 reporting in The New York Times included a two-year investigation alongside Type Investigations into the use of rap lyrics in criminal prosecutions in the United States.

== Awards and honors ==
Jaeah Lee has been awarded a number of prestigious awards and fellowships. She won the 2018 PEN America Los Angeles Literary Award for Journalism, the 2019 Debra E. Bernhardt Labor Journalism Prize, and notably the 2018 American Mosaic Journalism Prize, for which she was awarded a $100,000 grant. Lee noted that much of the prize money would go "toward paying off debt, savings for health insurance, retirement and an emergency fund. These might sound like boring answers, but it’s also a reminder that so many freelancers work without these basic needs.”

She was a 2021-22 Knight-Wallace reporting fellow at the University of Michigan, and a 2017 senior fellow at Brandeis University’s Schuster Institute for Investigative Journalism, as well as a 2013-2014 Middlebury College Environmental Journalism Fellow.

Lee has also received recognition from the Online News Association, Society of Professional Journalists, National Magazine Awards, and Data Journalism Awards.
