= Emilio Gutiérrez =

Emilio Gutiérrez may refer to:

- Emilio Gutiérrez Caba (born 1942), Spanish film director and actor
- Emilio Gutiérrez (journalist) (born 1963), Mexican journalist
- Emilio Gutiérrez (footballer) (born 1971), Spanish footballer
