= Hannah Allam =

Egyptian American journalist and reporter (born 1977)

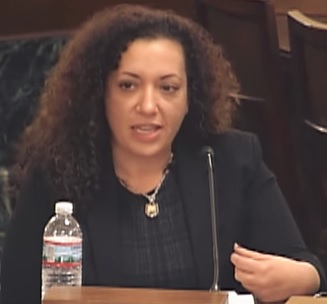
- Allam in 2016
- Born: 1977 (age 48–49); Oklahoma City, Oklahoma, U.S.
- Occupation: Journalist

Hannah Allam (born 1977) is an Egyptian American journalist and reporter who frequently covers the Middle East.

== Biography ==
Allam was born in Oklahoma City, Oklahoma to a Muslim family in 1977. She was raised in the US as well as Saudi Arabia and the United Arab Emirates, returning to the US to complete high school in Oklahoma. In college, she majored in journalism and was editor of the student newspaper at the University of Oklahoma. She is fluent in English, French, and Arabic.

As of November 2020, she has worked for The Washington Post. Allam has a wide background within MSN outlets. Prior to her position at The Washington Post, she was a Washington-based national security correspondent for NPR, focusing on homegrown extremism. Before joining NPR, she was a national correspondent for BuzzFeed News based in Washington, DC. Allam was the Middle East Bureau Chief (Baghdad) for McClatchy Newspapers. Early in her career, Allam interned for The Washington Post. She then became a staff reporter for the St. Paul Pioneer Press, from which McClatchy recruited her in 2003 to assist them with their in-depth coverage of the Iraq War. She worked for McClatchy as a war correspondent in Baghdad even during her 2010 pregnancy, although the military would not let her board helicopters once her belly started to show.

She was a 2008–2009 Nieman Fellow at Harvard University.

Having been partially raised in the Middle East, as well as having Egyptian heritage, allowed her unique opportunities to converse with women in Iraq during Middle Eastern conflicts. She contributed a chapter about her experiences to Zahra Hankir's book "Our Women on the Ground: Arab Women Reporting from the Arab World" which came out in 2019.

Allam has served as a judge for the American Mosaic Journalism Prize in 2018, 2019, 2021, and 2022.

== Awards ==
- 1999, 1998–1999 University of Oklahoma, Division of Student Affairs, CSPA Gold Circle Awards: Personality Profile, first place
- 2004, National Association of Black Journalists, 2004 Journalist of the Year Award.
- 2006, Overseas Press Club (with two of her Baghdad Bureau colleagues), Hal Boyle Award for best newspaper reporting from abroad for "Iraq: America's Failing War."
- 2008–2009, Nieman Fellow at Harvard University
- 2009, 30th annual McGill Lecture at the University of Georgia
