= Eisendrath =

Eisendrath is a surname. Notable people with the surname include:

- Charles Eisendrath (born 1940), American journalist
- Edwin Eisendrath (born 1958), American news media executive and politician
- John Eisendrath, American television writer and producer
- Maurice Eisendrath (1902–1973), American rabbi
- Polly Young-Eisendrath (born 1947), American psychologist
