= Skin-walker =

Witch in Navajo mythology

In Navajo culture, a skin-walker (Navajo: yee naaldlooshii) or skinwalker is a type of harmful witch who has the ability to turn into, possess, or disguise themselves as an animal. The term is never used for healers.

The term yee naaldlooshii, translating to "by means of it, it goes on all fours", is one of several types of skin-walkers within Navajo beliefs. These witches are seen as the antithesis of Navajo values, performing malevolent ceremonies and using manipulative magic in stark contrast to the beneficial works of medicine people.

The legend of skin-walkers is deeply embedded in Navajo tradition and rarely discussed with outsiders. This reticence is partly due to cultural taboos and the lack of contextual understanding by non-Navajos. Stories often depict skin-walkers using their powers for evil, and they are considered a source of fear and mystery within Navajo communities. Traditional accounts describe them as powerful sorcerers who, after engaging in various nefarious acts, gain the ability to transform into animals at will.

== Background ==
In the Navajo language, yee naaldlooshii translates to "by means of it, it goes on all fours". While perhaps the most common variety seen in horror fiction by non-Navajo people, the yee naaldlooshii is one of several varieties of skin-walkers in Navajo culture; specifically, they are a type of 'ánti'įhnii.

Navajo witches, including skin-walkers, represent the antithesis of Navajo cultural values. While community healers and cultural workers are known as medicine men and women, or by other positive terms in the community's Indigenous language, witches are seen as evil, performing harmful ceremonies and manipulative magic in a perversion of the good works medicine people traditionally perform. In order to practice their good works, traditional healers may learn about both good and evil magic, in order to protect against evil. But people who choose to become witches are seen as corrupt.

As of 1986, the legend of the skin-walkers is not well understood outside of Navajo culture, both due to reluctance to discuss the subject with outsiders, as well as what Cherokee Nation academic Adrienne Keene says is a lack of the necessary cultural context the stories are embedded within. Traditional Navajo people are reluctant to reveal skin-walker lore to non-Navajos, or to discuss it at all among those they do not trust. Keene, founder of the website Native Appropriations, has written in response to non-Navajos incorporating the legends into their writing (and specifically the impact when J. K. Rowling did so) that when this is done, "We as Native people are now opened up to a barrage of questions about these beliefs and traditions ... but these are not things that need or should be discussed by outsiders. At all. I'm sorry if that seems 'unfair', but that's how our cultures survive."

== Legend ==
Animals associated with witchcraft usually include tricksters such as the coyote; however, it may include other creatures, usually those associated with death or bad omens. They might also possess living animals or people and walk around in their bodies. Skin-walkers may be male or female.

Skin-walker stories told among Navajo children may be complete life and death struggles that end in either skin-walker or Navajo killing the other, or partial encounter stories that end in a stalemate. Encounter stories may be composed as Navajo victory stories, with the skin-walkers approaching a hogan and being scared away.

Non-Native interpretations of skin-walker stories typically take the form of partial encounter stories on the road, where the protagonist is temporarily vulnerable, but then escapes from the skin-walker in a way not traditionally seen in Navajo stories. Sometimes Navajo children take European folk stories and substitute skin-walkers for generic killers like The Hook.

== See also ==
- Deer Woman
- Huay Chivo
- Madam Koi Koi
- Nagual
- Odiyan clan
- Skinwalker Ranch
- Warlock
- Wendigo
- Werewolf
