= American Mosaic Journalism Prize =

Journalism prize

The American Mosaic Journalism Prize is a journalism prize awarded annually to two freelance journalists "for excellence in long-form, narrative, or deep reporting on stories about underrepresented and/or misrepresented groups in the present American landscape". The award is given by the Heising-Simons Foundation, a family foundation based in Los Altos and San Francisco, California.

The American Mosaic Journalism Prize was created in 2018 by the Heising-Simons Foundation. The winners are selected by ten judges who receive nominations from a confidential network of nominators. Winners are awarded an unrestricted cash prize of $100,000 each.

The American Mosaic Journalism Prize was directed by Brian Eule, Director of Journalism and Communications at the Heising-Simons Foundation until September 2024. Eule returned to the Heising-Simons Foundation in January 2026 as president and CEO. Past judges include Wesley Lowery (2018–2025), Katherine Boo (2022–2025), Hannah Allam (2018, 2019, 2021, 2022), Stephanie Foo (2020, 2023, 2024), Sam Freedman (2019, 2020), Farai Chideya (2023), Cindi Leive (2022), Mirta Ojito (2019, 2021), Sewell Chan (2024, 2025), Rose Arce (2024), Alexis Madrigal (2024), Kevin Mérida (2025), and Antonia Hylton (2019–2025), among others.

== Prize winners ==
=== 2018 ===
- Valeria Fernández. Her selected works for the 2018 Prize include “Sara's Demons Crossed the Border with Her: Where Could She Find Help for Her Mental-Health Problems?”, “He's Been Deported Twice. This Third Time, His Family is Leaving the US With Him”, and “These Asylum-Seekers are Being Forced to Raise Their Kids in Immigration ‘Jails’”.
- Jaeah Lee. Jaeah's selected works for the 2018 Prize include “After the Shooting” for The California Sunday Magazine, “What Does It Take to Convict a Cop Who Kills?” for VICE News, and “Why Is It So Hard for Inmates to Sue Prisons?” for Mother Jones.

=== 2019 ===
- Abe Streep. His selected works for the 2019 Prize include the New York Times Magazine article “What the Arlee Warriors Were Playing For” and “The Last Best Place” in Harper's Magazine.
- Rachel Kaadzi Ghansah. Rachel's selected works for the 2019 Prize include her Pulitzer Prize-winning GQ article “A Most American Terrorist: The Making of Dylann Roof” and “Henry Taylor's Wild Heart Can't Be Broken” in Vulture.

=== 2020 ===
- Rebecca Nagle (This Land). Her selected works for the 2020 Prize include her Crooked Media podcast “This Land” and her Washington Post piece “Half the land in Oklahoma could be returned to Native Americans. It should be."
- Darcy Courteau. Darcy's selected work for the 2020 Prize includes her June 2019 feature in The Atlantic, “Mireya's Third Crossing”.

=== 2021 ===
- David Dennis Jr. His selected works for the 2021 Prize include his 2020 Atlanta Magazine cover story “Ahmaud Arbery Will Not Be Erased” and his piece “An Ode To the Black Women At Dillard's” in Gay Mag.
- Michelle García. Michelle's selected works for the 2021 Prize include her 2019 feature in Adi Magazine, “Hand of Terror”, and “In the Midst of a Border Crisis, Cooking Is About More Than Survival” in Bon Appétit.

=== 2022 ===
- Julian Brave NoiseCat. His selected works for the 2022 Prize include “The Census Powwow” in Snap Judgment, National Geographic's “Indigenous fathers take lessons from their own experience to create healthy lifestyles for their children”, and “The House on Magnolia Street” featured in The California Sunday Magazine.
- Ryan Christopher Jones. Ryan's selected works for the 2022 Prize include the New York Times pieces “Underground Lives: The Sunless World of Immigrants in Queens” and “‘We’re Going to See What Else the Word Funeral Can Mean’”.

=== 2023 ===
- Cerise Castle. Her selected works for the 2023 Prize include articles related to her Knock LA series "A Tradition of Violence".
- Carvell Wallace. His selected works for the 2023 Prize include a profile of Justin Williams in Bicycling and a piece on Medium, “What if My Mother Had An Abortion”.

=== 2024 ===
- Dara T. Mathis. Her selected works for the 2024 Prize include The Atlantic article “A Blueprint for Black Liberation,” and “The Sound of My Unhearing”, featured in Blackbird.
- Tamir Kalifa. His selected works for the 2024 Prize include The New York Times pieces “After Uvalde, a cemetery anchors families of victims”, “Two children, a burst of gunfire and the year that came after”, and “After a summer of grief, it's back to school in Uvalde”.

=== 2025 ===
- Latria Graham. Her selected works for the 2025 Prize include Garden & Gun Magazine articles, “Masters of the green: the Black caddies of Augusta National” and “A roadside renaissance for Florida's highwaymen,” as well as “In Charleston, leaving nostalgia behind” featured in Condé Nast Traveler.
- Zaydee Sanchez. Her selected works for the 2025 Prize include text and photographs from The High Country News piece “California's transgender Latinx people find refuge and empowerment in community”, and the Mother Jones and Economic Hardship Reporting Project piece “Pajaro's quest to rebuild”, as well as photographs for “They believe pesticides caused their cancers. Proving it is almost impossible” featured in The Wall Street Journal and Economic Hardship Reporting Project.

=== 2026 ===
- Kavitha Cardoza. Her selected works for the 2026 Prize include The Hechinger Report articles “In Puerto Rico, Trump's campaign to dismantle the Department of Education has a particular bite” and “Kids with obesity do worse in school. One reason may be teacher bias,” as well as “For an Alabama Educator, a Job Done Too Well?” published by palabra., in partnership with The Hechinger Report and AL.com.
- Oliver Whang. His selected works for the 2026 Prize include The New York Times Magazine article “Opioids Ravaged a Kentucky Town. Then Rehab Became Its Business.”, “Two Appalachias” from The London Review of Books, and “In States That Won't Pay for Obesity Drugs, ‘They May as Well Have Never Been Created’” from The New York Times.

== Prize winner updates ==
=== Cerise Castle (2023 Prize Recipient) ===
In late February 2023, it was announced Cerise Castle had signed with CAA. In late 2023, Cerise began reporting on the Temecula school district in California for Capital & Main.

=== Darcy Courteau (2020 Prize Recipient) ===
Darcy published a piece about essential delivery workers for The Atlantic in June 2020. In January 2024, Darcy published “Hmong New Year in the Ozarks” with Commonweal Magazine.

=== David Dennis, Jr. (2021 Prize Recipient) ===
In June 2021, David joined The Undefeated as a full-time senior writer covering music for the culture vertical of the ESPN multimedia content initiative on sports, race, and culture.

In May 2022, David published a book with HarperCollins titled, “The Movement Made Us,” about his father's experience as part of the U.S. civil rights movement.

In February 2023, David aired a 6-minute story on ESPN’s Outside the Lines/SportsCenter on the Orangeburg Massacre: an event from 1968 involving athletes in the civil rights movement, when police shot 31 Black students on the campus of South Carolina State College and killed three young men. His podcast series “Rap Stories” premiered in June 2023.

=== Valeria Fernandez (2018 Prize Recipient) ===
In May 2021, Valeria published a personal story for PRI's “The World” about getting vaccinated for COVID-19 while pregnant. Additionally, she began airing a new radio show, “Comadres al Aire”.

palabra., a growing multimedia platform supporting National Association of Hispanic Journalists (NAHJ) freelance journalist members, named Valeria editor in 2021. In January 2022, Valeria was named a Fellow for the Emerson Collective to launch Altavoz Lab, a collaborative project within palabra. to strengthen reporting at community outlets that serve people of color and immigrants.

=== Michelle García (2021 Prize Recipient) ===
In June 2021, Michelle's piece, “The Media Isn't Ready to Cover Climate Apartheid”, which was among the pieces featured by the American Mosaic Journalism Award judges, was selected as a winner for the 2021 Covering Climate Now award.

As of December 2021, Michelle is working on a book titled Anima Sola with Viking Books.

=== Rachel Kaadzi Ghansah (2019 Prize Recipient) ===
In May, 2020, Rachel Kaadzi Ghansah entered into a book deal with Random House. The book, The Explainers and the Explorers, which is Rachel's first full-length work of non-fiction, will “be a two-volume, broad-sweeping work about the black experience in America, from its very beginnings to the current day,” according to Random House.

In November 2022, Rachel published a guest essay in The New York Times titled “The Mystic of Mar-a-Lago”.

Beginning in Spring 2023, Rachel will be joining Yale University to teach the creative writing course “Writing Outsiderness and Interiority”, which will admit students on a first-come-first-served basis.

=== Ryan Christopher Jones (2022 Prize Recipient) ===
As of April, 2022, Ryan has been accepted into a doctoral program in social anthropology at Harvard University. He will conduct visual research on how hostile environments, water, and air are impacting Latino communities across the American West.

In 2022, Ryan served on the photography jury for the 2021–2022 Pulitzer photojournalism winners. In 2025, Ryan served as a judge for that year's American Mosaic Journalism Prize.

=== Tamir Kalifa (2024 Prize Recipient) ===
In March 2024, Kalifa documented the families of the Israeli hostages as they marched from the communities attacked on October 7 to Jerusalem and covered the increase in settler violence in the West Bank for NPR.

In 2026, Tamir released Witness, a 9-song album, book, and live performance of original songs inspired by his reporting with his images, tracing stories of migration, survival, loss, and hope.

=== Jaeah Lee (2018 Prize Recipient) ===
In June 2021, Jaeah was named as a 2021–2022 Knight-Wallace Reporting Fellow at the University of Michigan.

In August 2021, Jaeah's article “Why Was Vicha Ratanapakdee Killed?” was published in The New York Times Magazine and in April 2022 Jaeah's opinion article “This Rap Song Helped Sentence a 17-Year-Old to Prison for Life” was published in The New York Times. In August 2023, Jaeah published “The Agony of Putting Your Life on Hold to Care for Your Parents” in The New York Times.

=== Dara Mathis (2024 Prize Recipient) ===
Dara completed a MacDowell Fellowship at the Monday Music Club of Orange, NJ, in 2024.

=== Rebecca Nagle (2020 Prize Recipient) ===
The second season of Rebecca Nagle's podcast series “This Land,” for which she won the Prize in 2020, was released at the end of August 2021. The podcast's second season focused on how the far right is using Native children to quietly dismantle American Indian tribes and advance a conservative agenda.

Rebecca was an awardee at the 2021 Women's Media Center Exceptional Journalism Awards in December 2021.

Rebecca's book “Indian Territory” was published in 2022 under HarperCollins. Additionally, in April 2022, Rebecca Nagle co-authored the article “Where Is Oklahoma Getting Its Numbers From in Its Supreme Court Case?” in The Atlantic with Allison Herrera. The article was cited by Supreme Court Justice Sonia Sotomayer on April 28, 2022, during arguments in the Supreme Court case Oklahoma v. Castro-Huerta.

Rebecca's book, “By the Fire We Carry”, will be published by HarperCollins in September 2024.

=== Julian Brave NoiseCat (2022 Prize Recipient) ===
Julian Brave NoiseCat's book, We Survived the Night, was published by Knopf in October 2025 and is an account of contemporary Indigenous life in the U.S. and Canada woven together with a personal narrative.

Julian gave the 2022 Commencement Charge of the Class speech for University of Michigan’s Ford School in April 2022. In August 2022, Julian published "Z's coming out: At a two-spirit pow wow in Toronto, my niece grapples with identity" in Canada's National Observer.

Julian's documentary, made in partnership with Emily Kassie, Sugarcane premiered at the 2024 Sundance Film Festival. At the festival, Julian and Emily Kassie won the Sundance Directing Award for the film. According to Deadline, following its premiere at Sundance, National Geographic purchased the rights to Sugarcane. National Geographic will show the documentary at global festivals throughout the rest of 2024 and release it in theaters before streaming Sugarcane on Disney+.

=== Abraham “Abe” Streep (2019 Prize Recipient) ===
In May 2021, Abe published a piece in The New Yorker exploring how violent police officers remain in law enforcement.

In September 2021, Abe published his book Brothers on Three with MacMillan Publishers. The book is an expansion on one of the pieces Abe won the Prize for in 2019, “What the Arlee Warriors Were Playing For”, and is the story of coming of age on Montana's Flathead Indian Reservation and a basketball team uniting a community during a suicide epidemic. "Brothers on Three" won the 2021 Montana Book Award, and the 2021 New Mexico-Arizona General Nonfiction Book Award.

In August 2023, Abe published “The American West Is Built on Contradicting Ideals. These Elk Hunters Were Caught in the Middle” for Outside. In May 2024, Abe published “Nova Scotia's Billion Dollar Lobster Wars” in The New Yorker.

=== Carvell Wallace (2023 Prize Recipient) ===
In October 2023, Carvell Wallace’s article “The Abundant Joy of Ayesha McGowan” was published in Bicycling. Carvell's book, "Another Word for Love", was published by Macmillan in May 2024.

Carvell was interviewed on KQED by Alexis Madrigal in March 2023 about his work.

== See also ==
- List of American Journalism Awards
- Heising-Simons Foundation
