= All My Relations (podcast) =

Indigenous politics podcast

- Genre: Interview podcast; Indigenous podcast
- Language: English

Cast and voices
- Hosted by: Matika Wilbur and Temryss Xeli'tia Lane

Production
- Length: 30–90 Minutes

Publication
- Original release: March 2, 2019

Related
- Related shows: Red Man Laughing; Toasted Sister; This Land
- Website: www.allmyrelationspodcast.com

All My Relations is a podcast about the Indigenous peoples of the Americas.

== Background ==
The show was created in 2019 by Matika Wilbur (Tulalip and Swinomish) and Adrienne Keene (Cherokee), who were the original co-hosts. Desi Small-Rodriguez (Northern Cheyenne) was later added as another co-host for season three. Both Small-Rodriguez and Keene left the podcast after season three. As of January 2026, the podcast is co-hosted by Wilbur and Temryss Xeli'tia Lane (Lummi Nation).

The show discusses topics including the Native American mascot controversy, Columbus Day and Indigenous People's Day, race and racism, and Indigenous food sovereignty.

The show is an interview based podcast.

== Reception ==
The A.V. Club included the show on their list of "The best podcasts of 2019 so far". Polygon included the show on their list of "The best podcasts of 2019 (so far)". The Handbook included the show on their list of "The Best Podcasts of 2019". Marie Claire included the show on their list of "The Best New Podcasts of 2019". Fortune included the show on their list of "The Must-Listen Podcasts on Race and History". The Toronto Star included the show among their "Favourite Indigenous Podcasts". Vanity Fair included the show on their list of the "Seven Essential Listens From the Indigenous Podcasting Boom".

All My Relations was an honoree in the 2020 and 2021 Webby Awards.

== See also ==
- List of Native American podcasts
