= Native Appropriations =

Blog discussing indigenous portrayals

- Website type: Blog
- Available in: English
- Owner: Blogger
- Creator: Adrienne Keene
- Website: nativeappropriations.com
- Commercial: No
- Launched: January 11, 2010; 16 years ago

Native Appropriations is a blog that criticizes and analyzes the ways that Indigenous people are depicted in mainstream culture. Active since 2010, the website is created and maintained by Cherokee Nation scholar Adrienne Keene.

== Subjects ==
Some of the most frequently discussed topics on the blog are "hipster headdresses", the Native American mascot controversy and what the author deems to be appropriation and misrepresentations of Native American cultures in Hollywood movies. Targets of critique include the Washington Redskins use of an ethnic slur as the name for their football team, The Lone Ranger movie remake, depictions of skin walkers and Native American spiritual beliefs in the work of author J. K. Rowling, the wearing of a hipster headdress and statements by musician Christina Fallin, Halloween "Pocahottie" costumes, and Urban Outfitters.

Though much of the blog's commentary is critical, it is not exclusively so: Nelly Furtado, for example, has been praised for her respectful engagement with Native hoop and shawl dancers.

== Coverage and influence ==
Keene observes that Native Americans are barely represented in mainstream media, and journalists often turn to non-Native sources, rather than to Natives themselves, on the rare occasions when they do cover Native issues. However, the increasing popularity of her blog and appearance on other social media such as Twitter has made her a widely quoted expert on matters to do with appropriations, with mentions in the BBC, NPR, The Guardian, the Phoenix New Times, Al Jazeera, Time magazine and other major news outlets. The Guardian has credited her with leading a successful campaign against stereotypical imagery created by Paul Frank Industries: the company later invited Keene and other experts to help design new product lines working with Native artists.
