= National Press Club (United States) =

Professional organization and social club for journalists in Washington, D.C.

- Formation: March 29, 1908; 118 years ago
- Type: Press club
- Headquarters: 529 14th St. NW, Washington, D.C.
- Website: www.press.org

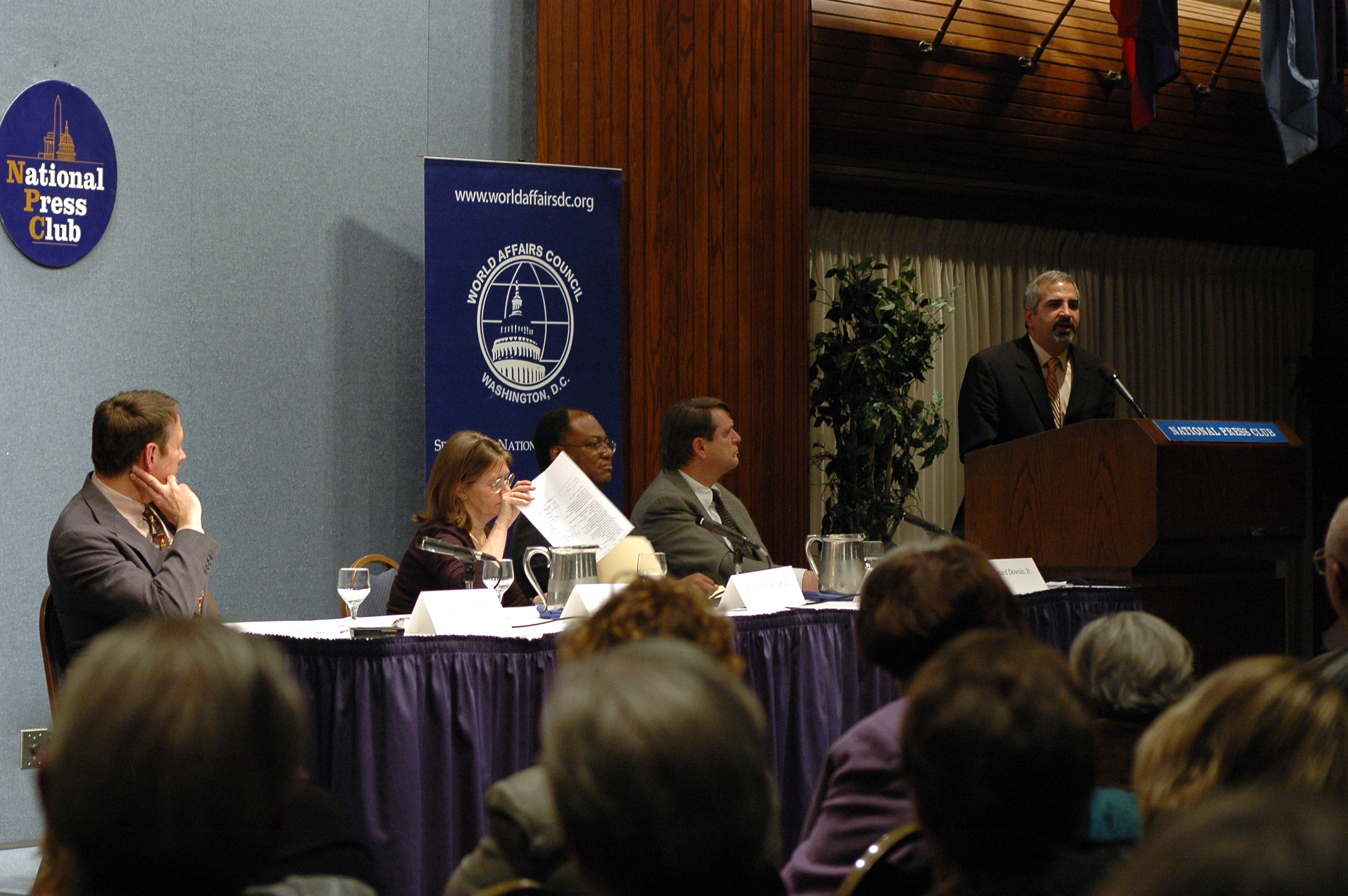
A meeting at the National Press Club in March 2007

The National Press Club is a professional organization and social community in Washington, D.C., for journalists and communications professionals. It hosts public and private gatherings with invited speakers from public life. The club also offers event space to outside groups to host business meetings, news conferences, industry gatherings, and social events. It was founded in 1908.

External audio
- Sample of Luncheon Speakers
- National Press Club Luncheon Speakers, Harry S. Truman, four press conferences – May 10, 1954, April 12, 1958, December 8, 1958, November 2, 1961, Library of Congress
- National Press Club Luncheon Speakers, A. Philip Randolph, August 26, 1963, 55:17, Randolph speaks starting at 4:56 about the forthcoming March on Washington, Library of Congress
- National Press Club Luncheon Speakers, James H. Billington, January 12, 1989, 57:46, Billington speaks starting at 6:33, Library of Congress

The club has been visited by most U.S. presidents; since Warren Harding, many have also been members and spoken from the club's podium. Others who have appeared at the club include monarchs, prime ministers, premiers, members of Congress, Cabinet officials, ambassadors, scholars, entertainers, business leaders, and athletes. The club's emblem is the owl, in deference to wisdom, awareness and nights spent working.

== History ==
=== Founding ===
On March 12, 1908, 32 newspapermen met at the Washington Chamber of Commerce to discuss starting a club for journalists. At the meeting they agreed to meet again on March 29 in the F Street parlor of the Willard Hotel to frame a constitution for the National Press Club. The Club founders laid down a credo which promised "to promote social enjoyment among the members, to cultivate literary taste, to encourage friendly intercourse among newspapermen and those with whom they were thrown in contact in the pursuit of their vocation, to aid members in distress and to foster the ethical standards of the profession."

With $300, the founding members moved into its first club quarters on the second floor of 1205 F Street NW. By 1909, the club had outgrown its new quarters and moved above Rhodes Tavern at the corner of 15th and F Streets. Once again the club outgrew its residence and moved to the Albee Building (formerly Riggs) at 15th and G streets.

=== Membership ===
At its founding, the club was only open to white men but it began to accept non-white men in 1955. In 1970, it was opened to women. Prior to these changes in membership, non-white men and women had their own designated press clubs.

=== Women's National Press Club ===
In 1919, female journalists founded the Women's National Press Club, when the Nineteenth Amendment to the United States Constitution was ratified.

In December 1970, members of the Women's National Press Club voted to allow men into their club and renamed it the Washington Press Club. The next month, the National Press Club voted 227 to 56 to admit women. In 1972, journalist Gloria Steinem, a feminist leader and founder of Ms. magazine, was the first woman to speak at the National Press Club, although first lady Eleanor Roosevelt attended lunch at the then all-male club in 1938. In 1985, the Washington Press Club and the National Press Club merged under the banner of the National Press Club.

The Washington Press Club Foundation (WPCF) continues as a nonprofit organization to promote equality, education and excellence among journalists in print and broadcast media. It has a Women in Journalism Oral History Project. Oral History videos (Mary Garber, Betsy Wade, Dorothy Gilliam, Eileen Shanahan, Ruth Cowan Nash) are archived by C-SPAN.

The Washington Press Club Foundation also arranges journalism internships for women and minorities in partnership with Washington DC–based news bureaus.

Since 1945, an annual (late January - early February) Washington Press Club Foundation Salute to Congress, now called the 'Washington Press Club Foundation Congressional Dinner, is its signature fundraising event, with its video archived by C-SPAN since 1985.

=== Capital Press Club ===
African-American journalists founded the Capital Press Club in 1944. The first African-American male journalist (Louis Lautier) was accepted for National Press Club membership in 1955. Reporting on that event, TIME said:

Negroes are admitted to the club's big banquet hall when it is rented out to other organizations, but only two have ever ventured into the members' private dining room or Press Club bar. One, William Hastie, now a federal judge, was refused service; the other, C.I.O. Aide George Weaver, was served luncheon, but his newsman host got an anonymous letter warning him never to bring a Negro again.

=== National Press Building ===
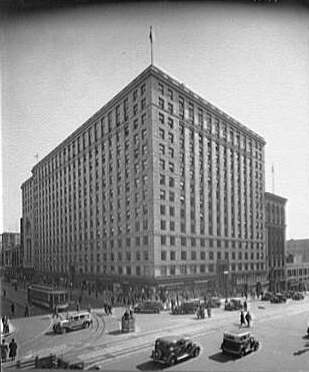
The National Press Building following its opening in the early 1900s

In 1925, National Press Club president Henry L. Sweinhart appointed a special building committee to plan for a permanent club headquarters. The Ebbitt Hotel was demolished, and the Ebbitt Grill moved to the Albee building. The new National Press Building, at 14th and F Streets NW, was completed in August 1927, and included retail space and office space intended for Washington, D.C.–based news bureaus with the club occupying the 13th and 14th floors. In order to increase their funding, the club made a deal with movie studio 20th Century Fox to build a theater as part of the building.

In 1932, Bascom N. Timmons, who established an independent news bureau in Washington, D.C., became president of the press club. He worked to save the press club building in New York City from foreclosure by persuading President Franklin Roosevelt to sign an amendment to the federal bankruptcy law that blocked pending foreclosure and kept the building open.

The National Press Building was renovated from 1984 to 1985, in conjunction with the development of the adjacent The Shops at National Place. Beginning in 2004, a 10-year, $15 million second renovation occurred. In 2011, the building was sold to Quadrangle Development Corp. and AEW Core Property Trust (U.S.) for $167.5 million. The owners placed the building, assessed at $237.5 million, up for sale in August 2014.

The National Press Club also rents space to other organizations.

=== Continuation ===
During the Great Depression, the club struggled financially as it was beginning to be recognized as an influential group. It managed to find additional funding from wealthy individuals.

Regular weekly luncheons for speakers began in 1932 with an appearance by president-elect Franklin D. Roosevelt. Since then the club has hosted an average of 70 luncheons each year with prominent people. Over the years Nikita Khrushchev, Soong Mei-ling (Madame Chiang Kai-shek), Golda Meir, Indira Gandhi, Muhammad Ali, Charles de Gaulle, Robert Redford, Boris Yeltsin, Elizabeth Taylor, Nelson Mandela, Yasser Arafat, Dalai Lama, Angelina Jolie, George Carlin, Mahmoud Ahmadinejad, and Elizabeth Warren have all spoken at the club.

Speaking at the National Press Club to mark his retirement, CBS commentator Eric Sevareid called the club the "sanctum sanctorum of American journalists" and said "It's the Westminster Hall, it's Delphi, it's Mecca, the Wailing Wall for everybody in this country having anything to do with the news business; the only hallowed place I know of that's absolutely bursting with irreverence."

The Broadcast Operations Center opened in 2006. Located on the 4th floor of the National Press Building, a full-service video production with facilities for webcast and video conference solutions, video production capabilities, global transmission portals, and web enabled multimedia.

== Professional development ==
The National Press Club Journalism Institute, the non-profit arm of the National Press Club, trains communications professionals in a changing media environment, provides scholarships to the next generation of journalists, recognizes excellence in journalism, and promotes a free press. The institute also trains working journalists through its Bloomberg Center for Electronic Journalism, and provides research for communications professionals through its Eric Friedheim Journalism Library.

== Awards ==
The organization administers the annual Freedom of the Press Award, which honors two recipients, one foreign and one domestic, who have demonstrated the "principles of press freedom and open government." Among the winners include Brian Karem, Rana Ayyub, Joseph Hosey, Tim Tai, Mahmoud Abou Zeid, and Ahmed Humaidan. Anna Politkovskaya was awarded posthumously in 2007.

In December 2017, the National Press Club awarded the John Aubuchon Press Freedom Award to Mexican journalist Emilio Gutiérrez, who faced deportation from the United States, "on behalf of Mexico's besieged journalists."

== See also ==
- Gridiron Club
- Pen & Pencil Club
- Press club
- White House Correspondents' Association
- List of American gentlemen's clubs
- National Press Club (Australia)
