= Toasted Sister =

Native American food heritage podcast

- Genre: Food
- Language: English

Creative team
- Created by: Andi Murphy

Cast and voices
- Hosted by: Andi Murphy

Music
- Theme music composed by: CW Ayon

Production
- Production: Andi Murphy

Publication
- No. of episodes: 62
- Original release: January 5, 2017
- Provider: Koahnic Broadcast Corporation; Native Voice One

Reception
- Cited for: 2019 National Native Media awards

Related
- Related shows: Red Man Laughing; This Land; All My Relations
- Website: toastedsisterpodcast.com

Toasted Sister is a food journalism podcast hosted and produced by food writer and photographer Andi Murphy that highlights chefs and farmers who work to preserve Indigenous food heritage. The podcast explores what Indigenous cuisine is, where it comes from, where it’s headed, and how it’s used to connect them and their people to their origins and traditions through interviews with Native chefs and other members of the food industry.

== Background ==
Murphy lives in Albuquerque, New Mexico, and is a member of the Navajo tribe. She is an associate producer at Native America Calling. While Murphy did not grow up with significant knowledge of indigenous food, she began learning about indigenous foodways when she started working at Native America Calling. The podcast was inspired by Murphy's own love of cooking and desire to teach fellow natives how to cook using foods sourced from a commodity Supplemental Food Program. Murphy often proposed food articles to her editor, who then began to limit the amount of food content that Murphy could produce. A coworker suggested that Murphy begin a podcast, so she started Toasted Sister in 2017. According to her, Indigenous people have a mutual relationship with food; it appears in oral history, songs and music, and plays a role in ceremonies. She wants to combine the historical memory of these foods with ingredients that are readily available today. Toasted Sister seeks not only to share native food culture but also to help Native communities cook using foods they're unaccustomed to, such as when her New Mexico community was given wild rice, which is indigenous to the Midwest, as part of a commodity foods program.

This show is supported by the Koahnic Broadcast Corporation. It’s affiliated with Native Voice One. It plays regularly on Navajo Technical University’s KCZY radio station and on the RIVR (Rising Indigenous Voices Radio).

== Reception ==
Zach Johnston wrote in Uproxx that the podcast is "a must-listen for anyone looking to finally try the real foods of the Americas."

=== Awards ===
Year	Category	Institution or publication	Result	Notes	Ref.
2019	Radio/podcast pro division ii - General Excellence	National Native Media Award	Won	First Place	

== See also ==
- List of food podcasts
- List of Native American podcasts
