= Heising-Simons Foundation =

American charitable foundation

- Formation: 2007
- Type: Private foundation
- Headquarters: Los Altos, CA
- Key people: Liz Simons, Mark Heising, Caitlin Heising
- Disbursements: $1.456 billion (2007-2025)
- Website: https://www.hsfoundation.org/

The Heising-Simons Foundation is a private foundation established by philanthropists Elizabeth (Liz) Simons and Mark Heising in Los Altos, California in 2007. Liz Simons and Mark Heising signed the Giving Pledge in 2016.

The Heising-Simons Foundation's main areas of work include early childhood education, science, climate and clean energy, community and opportunity, and human rights. It also funds a science fellowship known as the 51 Pegasi b Fellowship, and the American Mosaic Journalism Prize. It does not accept unsolicited grant proposals.

As of January 1, 2026, the Heising-Simons Foundation's President and CEO is Brian Eule.

== Areas of Funding ==
=== CEO Fund: Technology and Society ===
The Heising-Simons Foundation’s CEO Fund addresses the impact of technology on society.

In 2023, the Heising-Simons Foundation partnered with other philanthropies to contribute more than $200 million in funding toward public interest efforts to mitigate artificial intelligence (AI) harms and promote responsible use and innovation.

=== Climate and Clean Energy ===
The Heising-Simons Foundation's Climate and Clean Energy program funds work around energy policy analysis, public utility commissions, energy efficiency standards, and climate communications. The Climate and Clean Energy program was named one of 25 mid-sized environmental grantmakers by Inside Philanthropy. The Heising-Simons Foundation joined the Climate Funders Justice Pledge in 2022.

In 2021, the Heising-Simons Foundation was one of the founding members of the Equitable Building Electrification Fund, a fund that seeks to advance an equitable transition to building electrification for communities most impacted by fossil fuels.

=== Education ===
The Heising-Simons Foundation’s Education program awards grants in early childhood education, including supporting early math education and dual language learners.

In 2019, the Education program co-created the Early Educator Investment Collaborative, a group of early childhood funders that also includes the Ballmer Group, the Bezos Family Foundation, the Bill & Melinda Gates Foundation, the Buffett Early Childhood Fund, the David and Lucile Packard Foundation, the Foundation for Child Development, and the Stranahan Foundation.

=== Human Rights ===
The Heising-Simons Foundation’s Human Rights program focuses on criminal justice reform, immigration grant rights work, and supporting human rights for all.

Caitlin Heising serves on the board of directors of Human Rights Watch (HRW) and is the vice chair of HRW’s U.S. Program Advisory Committee.

In 2023, the Heising-Simons Foundation signed the California Black Freedom Fund’s Philanthropic Sign on Letter in response to police violence in the wake of Tyre Nichols’ death.

=== Journalism ===
The Heising-Simons Foundation’s Journalism portfolio recognizes and supports journalism as a critical element of a healthy and multicultural democracy, focusing in underrepresented groups and voices in media and investigative journalism.

The Foundation's Journalism portfolio awards the American Mosaic Journalism Prize, which annually awards two freelance journalists with $100,000 each in unrestricted funds for "excellence in long-form, narrative or deep reporting about underrepresented and/or misrepresented groups in the American landscape".

In September 2023, the Foundation’s Journalism portfolio was an investor in the Press Forward initiative.

=== Science ===
The Heising-Simons Foundation's Science program awards research grants in astronomy and cosmology, fundamental physics, paleoclimatology, climate science, and the search for axion dark matter.

The Heising-Simons Foundation partnered with the Simons Foundation to fund the $40 million Simons Observatory, an astronomy facility in the Chilean desert. It also awarded $300,000 in funding for a major upgrade to the Kast Spectrograph at Lick Observatory in 2014.

In 2017, the Science program launched the 51 Pegasi b Fellowship, intended to allow post-doctorate researchers the opportunity to conduct theoretical, observational, and experimental research in planetary astronomy. In its inaugural year, the Heising-Simons Foundation awarded four postdoc researchers $375,000 each to support their independent research over three years.

In 2022, the Heising-Simons Foundation awarded a three-year grant to the Kavli Institute for Theoretical Physics (KITP) at UC Santa Barbara for the launch of a fellowship that aims to address the underrepresentation of minorities in physics, including theoretical physics. Funds cover a stipend for fellows, as well as travel and accommodations for six to eight weeks.

== See also ==
- American Mosaic Journalism Prize
- Giving Pledge
- Simons Foundation
- Jim Simons
- Simons Observatory
- Environmental Defense Fund
- Human Rights Watch
- Philanthropy in the United States
