= Red Man Laughing =

Native American comedy podcast

- Genre: Comedy and Humor; Interview; Art and Culture
- Language: English

Creative team
- Created by: Ryan McMahon

Cast and voices
- Hosted by: Ryan McMahon

Production
- Length: 40 minutes

Publication
- No. of seasons: 9
- Original release: August 18, 2011
- Provider: Indian & Cowboy Podcast Network

Related
- Related shows: Toasted Sister; This Land; All My Relations
- Website: Archived 2020-04-15 at the Wayback Machine

Red Man Laughing is a comedy podcast hosted by Ryan McMahon that focuses on Indigenous art, culture, and storytelling in Canada.

== Background ==
McMahon interviewed Romeo Saganash on Red Man Laughing in 2015. The show includes interviews with guests such as Nick Sherman, Richard Van Camp, and Joseph Boyden. McMahon interviewed Elizabeth LaPensée on her experience in the academic world and the need for creating new things. The show started out as a comedy podcast, but the fifth season began with McMahon angrily calling out the celebrations surrounding the 150th anniversary of Canada for ignoring problems that Indigenous communities are dealing with such as Indigenous food security, missing and murdered Indigenous women, and the impacts caused by residential school system. On the second to last episode of the season, "Land", McMahon addresses Indigenous land claims and the important role that returning land to Indigenous people plays in reconciliation. Even though the show receives up to 10,000 listeners every episode McMahon has had difficulty making money from ad revenue. Red Man Laughing is one of the podcasts on Ryan McMahon's Indigenous multimedia network called Indian & Cowboy.

== Format ==
The show includes a "rant" section where McMahon talks about whatever is bothering him at the time.

== Reception ==
The show won the 2020 Canadian Podcast award for "Outstanding Indigenous Series". The Canadian Broadcasting Corporation included the podcast on their list of "podcasts for Canada 150". The Water Shed Watch Salmon Society included the podcast on their list of their "2020 Podcast Recommendations".

== Live events ==
In 2014, there were some anonymous online threats to "shoot up" the Alberta Theater where there was going to be a live showing of Red Man Laughing. Red Man Laughing had a live show at the 2nd Annual Vancouver Podcast Festival in 2019. In 2020, Red Man Laughing was performed live for the opening of the Available Light Film Festival. McMahon went on tour for his 9th season of the show.

== Adaptations ==
In 2014, the show was adapted into a national comedy special on CBC Radio One for National Indigenous Peoples Day and was being adapted into a television series.

== See also ==
- List of Native American podcasts
