= Livingston Award =

Series of journalism awards

- Awarded for: Journalism
- Location: Ann Arbor, Michigan
- Country: United States
- Presented by: University of Michigan
- Hosted by: Board of National Judges
- Reward: $10,000
- First award: 1981
- Website: wallacehouse.umich.edu/livingston-awards/

The Livingston Awards at the University of Michigan are American journalism awards issued to media professionals under the age of 35 for local, national, and international reporting. They are the largest, all-media, general reporting prizes in America. Popularly referred to as the "Pulitzer for the Young", the awards have recognized the early talent of journalists, including Michele Norris, Christiane Amanpour, David Remnick, Ira Glass, J. R. Moehringer, Thomas Friedman, Rick Atkinson, David Isay, Sharmeen Obaid-Chinoy, Tom Ashbrook, Nicholas Confessore, C. J. Chivers, Michael S. Schmidt, and Ronan Farrow.

== Overview ==
Unlike other prizes in journalism (such as the George Foster Peabody Awards, the George Polk Awards, the National Journalism Awards and the Pulitzer Prizes), the Livingston Awards judge print, broadcast, and online entries against one another.

The winners are selected by the Livingston Board of National Judges. These include Christiane Amanpour, Ken Auletta, Dean Baquet, Charles Gibson, Ellen Goodman, John F. Harris, Clarence Page, and Anna Quindlen. Mike Wallace was one of the national judges for several years.

== History ==
Mollie Parnis Livingston, one of America's first fashion designers known by name, established the Livingston Awards in 1981 to honor her son, Robert, who published the journalism review More.

For thirty years, The Mollie Parnis Livingston Foundation, headed by Livingston's nephew Neal Hochman, sponsored the awards. Recent supporters include the Indian Trail Foundation, Christiane Amanpour, the John S. and James L. Knight Foundation, and the University of Michigan.

== Richard M. Clurman Award ==
Since 1996, the Livingston Awards ceremony has also included the presentation of the Richard M. Clurman Award, which recognizes exceptional mentors in journalism who excel in nurturing, critiquing, and inspiring young journalists. The award is named in honor of Richard M. Clurman, a former editor at Time and the architect of the Livingston Awards.

=== Richard M. Clurman Award recipients ===
- 1996 Charles G. Peters
- 1997 Gordon Manning
- 1998 William F. Buckley Jr.
- 1999:
  - Mary McGrory
  - Thomas Winship
- 2000 Arthur Gelb
- 2001 Clay Felker
- 2002 Eugene C. Patterson
- 2003 Jim Bellows
- 2004 Bill Kovach
- 2005 John Seigenthaler
- 2006 Eugene L. Roberts, Jr.
- 2007 Judy Woodruff
- 2008 Anna Quindlen
- 2009 John S. Carroll
- 2010 Paul E. Steiger
- 2011 Sandra Mims Rowe
- 2012 Stephen B. Shepard
- 2013 Victor Navasky
- 2014 Steven Brill
- 2015 Tom Brokaw
- 2016 Charles R. Eisendrath
- 2017 Gwen Ifill
- 2018 Walt Mossberg
- 2019 Rob Hiaasen
- 2021 Susan Chira
- 2022 Fred Hiatt
- 2023 Ken Auletta — special award (Note: Since Auletta was instrumental in the creation of the Clurman Award itself, he was instead given a "special tribute" rather than an actual Clurman Award.)
- 2024 Kevin Merida
- 2025 Norman Pearlstine

== See also ==
- List of journalism awards
- Knight-Wallace Fellowship
