= Nick Perry (journalist) =

American journalist

Nick Perry is a journalist who has worked in the U.S. and New Zealand. Since 2011, he has been the Associated Press correspondent for New Zealand and the South Pacific . He was previously a reporter at The Seattle Times.

He wrote Scoreboard, Baby: A Story of College Football, Crime, and Complicity with Ken Armstrong in 2010.

He was a 2011 Knight-Wallace Fellow at the University of Michigan

== Awards ==
- 2011 Knight-Wallace Journalism Fellowship
- 2011 Edgar Allan Poe Award
- 2010 Pulitzer Prize (part of Seattle Times team):
- 2009 Michael Kelly Award
- 2009 Payne Award
- 2008 George Polk Award
- 2008 Medill Medal Winner finalist
