= Monte Reel =

American author and journalist

Monte Reel is an American author and journalist. His narrative nonfiction books include The Last of the Tribe (2010), Between Man and Beast (2013), and A Brotherhood of Spies (2018). From 2004 to 2008, he was the South America correspondent for The Washington Post and previously, he wrote for The Washington Post in Washington and Iraq.

== Career ==
His newspaper career began at the St. Louis Post-Dispatch.

In 1999–2000, while at the St. Louis Post-Dispatch, he was awarded a Knight-Wallace Fellowship at the University of Michigan in Ann Arbor, for Arabic studies and narrative writing.

He was The Washington Post’s correspondent in South America from 2004 to 2008, and previously he wrote for the newspaper in Washington and Iraq.

Reel's longform journalism has appeared The New York Times Magazine, The New Yorker, Harper’s Magazine, Outside, Bloomberg Businessweek, and other magazines. His essays have been featured in The Best American Travel Writing series and the Pushcart Prize anthologies.

== Books ==
=== The Last of the Tribe ===
- The last of the tribe : the epic quest to save a lone man in the Amazon (1 ed.). New York: Scribner. 2010. ISBN 9781416594758.

The Last of the Tribe (Scribner, 2010) focuses on the search and discovery of the last surviving member of an uncontacted indigenous tribe in the Brazilian Amazon. The San Francisco Chronicle called it "Avatar for grown-ups” and praised the book for being “expertly told: perfectly timed, thoroughly researched and descriptively written." The story was optioned for the screen by Doug Liman, Chockstone Pictures.

=== Between Man and Beast ===
Between Man and Beast (Doubleday 2013) tells the story of Paul Du Chaillu, a young 19th century explorer who emerged from expeditions in Africa with the first specimens of the gorilla – an animal that previously was the subject of myth and legend. Du Chaillu’s adventures, both in the jungle and in the showrooms of Europe and the United States, coincided with the publication of Darwin’s On the Origin of Species, and they helped ignite the evolution debate. The book was selected as one of the Best Books of 2013 by Amazon. Nature called it “a supremely entertaining, enlightening and memorable read,” and the San Antonio Express-News remarked that “the mind staggers to recall that this story is a work of nonfiction.”

=== A Brotherhood of Spies ===
A Brotherhood of Spies (Doubleday 2018) tells the story of the U-2 spy plane and explores how it forever changed the nature and scope of American espionage. The story focuses on four individuals involved in the plane’s development: Edwin Land, the founder of Polaroid; CIA officer Richard M. Bissell Jr.; Clarence “Kelly” Johnson, Lockheed’s chief engineer; and Francis Gary Powers, a pilot recruited by the CIA to fly the U-2. In a pre-publication review, Publishers Weekly wrote that “this exemplary work provides a wholly satisfying take on a central chapter of the Cold War – a dramatic story of zeal and adventure.”

== Awards ==
- 2018 Overseas Press Club Morton Frank Award for international magazine writing
- 2017 Gerald Loeb Award for Explanatory business journalism for "Superbug Spreaders"
- 2005 Selden Ring Award for investigative reporting

== Personal life ==
In 2018, Monte Reel lived in Buenos Aires with his wife and daughter.

== See also ==
- Ishi
