= Kunal Majumder =

Indian journalist

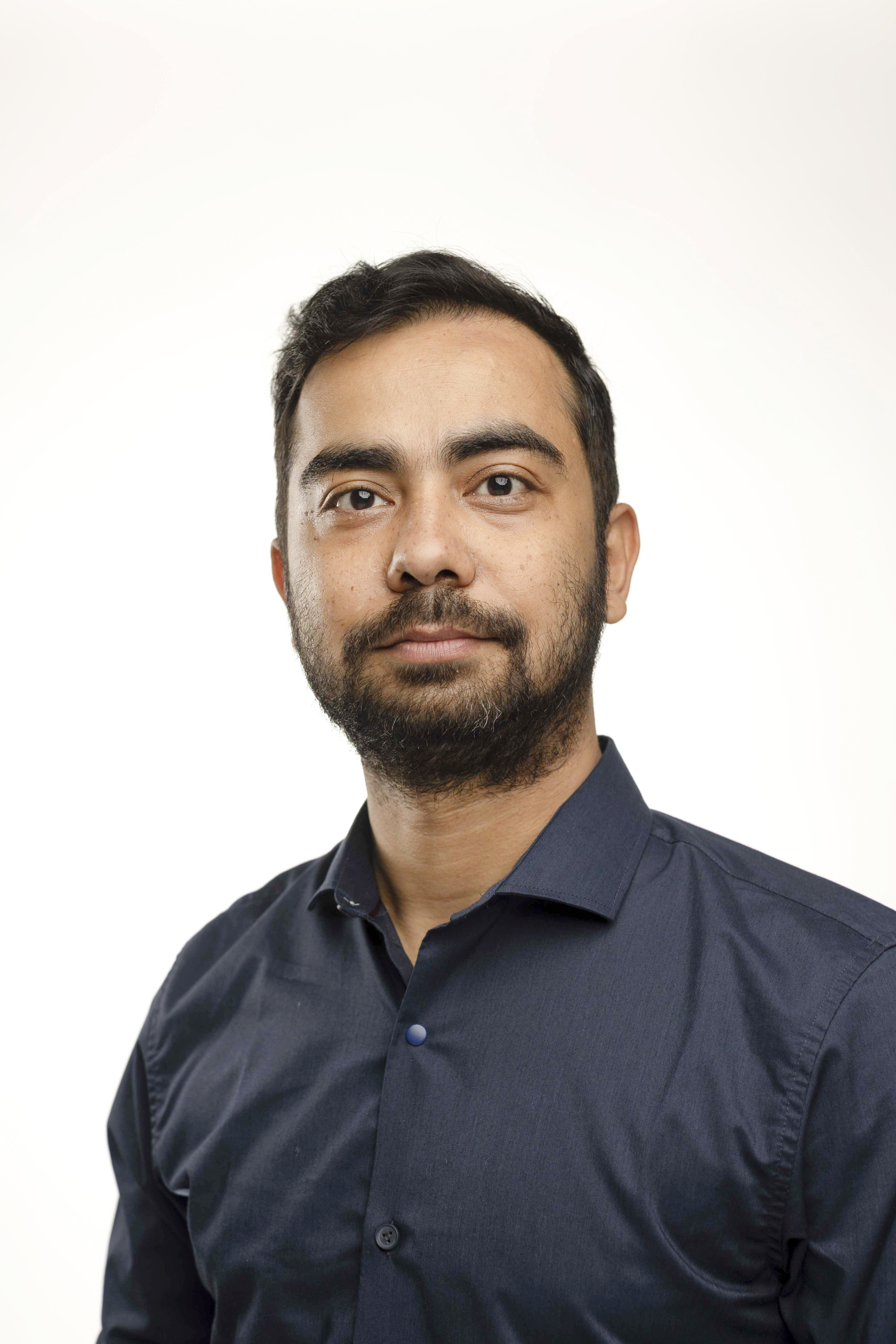
- Born: Dhanbad, Jharkhand, India
- Education: De Nobili School, FRI, Jamia Millia Islamia, Sciences Po, University of Michigan
- Occupations: Journalist, academic
- Organization: Committee to Protect Journalists

Kunal Majumder is an Indian journalist and media academic. His areas of work include press freedom and journalist safety, serving as India's representative at the Committee to Protect Journalists.

Majumder has worked as a journalist with Tehelka, Indian Express Group, Rajasthan Patrika Group and Zee Media Corporation. He later served as a visiting faculty member at the AJK Mass Communication Centre, Jamia Millia Islamia, New Delhi.

He has been honoured with the UNFPA–Laadli Award for Gender Sensitivity and the Statesman Award for Rural Reporting. He is also a recipient of the Knight-Wallace Fellowship for journalists at the University of Michigan for 2024–2025.

== Education ==
Born and raised in Dhanbad, Jharkhand (then part of Bihar), Majumder studied at the Jesuit-run De Nobili School, FRI, Dhanbad. He graduated with a degree in English literature, History and Political Science in 2007, and obtained a postgraduate degree in Journalism from Jamia Millia Islamia, New Delhi, in 2009.

As part of his master's programme, he completed a journalism exchange semester at Sciences Po, Paris, and represented India at the Foreign Correspondents' Programme in Helsinki.

== Career ==
=== Journalism ===
Majumder began his journalism career in 2009 as a business correspondent at Tehelka. He later served as senior correspondent, principal correspondent, and assistant editor at the magazine.

In 2014, he joined Rajasthan Patrika and contributed to its English news platform, Catch News. He subsequently worked with Zee Media Corporation for its online portal DNA.

In October 2016, he was appointed editor of inUth.com, a multi-platform, video-focused digital initiative launched by The Indian Express Group.

Subsequently, he joined the Committee to Protect Journalists (CPJ) as a correspondent, where he documented cases related to press freedom in India. Since 2022, he has been serving as the organisation’s India Representative.

=== Academia ===
In January 2021, Majumder joined the AJK Mass Communication Centre, Jamia Millia Islamia, New Delhi, as visiting faculty. He also served as an adjunct professor at the Haridev Joshi University of Journalism and Mass Communication, Rajasthan.

In April 2025, he delivered a TEDx talk at the University of Michigan, Ann Arbor titled "Why Press Freedom Is at the Root of All Rights", in which he highlighted the foundational role of free expression in sustaining democratic societies.

== Work ==
Majumder has been associated with the Committee to Protect Journalists (CPJ) since June 2018, where his work has focused on promoting press freedom and defending the rights of journalists.

At CPJ, he has monitored restrictions on journalists' rights in India, making press freedom a key area of concern. His commentary and reporting on the repeated arrests of journalists in Kashmir during 2024 have been cited internationally in discussions on global press freedom.

He has also advocated for the safety of journalists at the ground level in India in interactions with state authorities. In 2024, under his leadership, CPJ in collaboration with The Hindu launched a safety guide for journalists covering the Lok Sabha elections.

== See also ==
- Committee to Protect Journalists
- Reporters Without Borders
- Index of Freedom in the World
- Mass media in India
