= Knight-Wallace Fellowship =

Journalism organization

- Formation: 1973; 53 years ago
- Founder: Ben L. Yablonky
- Purpose: Allows accomplished journalists time to reflect on their careers and focus on honing their skills
- Headquarters: Wallace House
- Location: Ann Arbor, Michigan, United States of America
- Official language: English
- Program Director: Lynette Clemetson
- Associate Director: Ashley Bates
- Parent organization: University of Michigan
- Affiliations: Livingston Awards for Young Journalists
- Budget: $2.3 million
- Endowment: $60 million
- Staff: 8
- Website: wallacehouse.umich.edu/knight-wallace
- Formerly called: NEH Journalism Fellowship (1973–1984); Journalists in Residence (1984–1997); Michigan Journalism Fellowship (1987–2002)

The Knight-Wallace Fellowship (previously known as the NEH Journalism Fellowship and the Michigan Journalism Fellowship) is an award given to accomplished journalists at the University of Michigan. Knight-Wallace Fellowships are awarded to reporters, editors, photographers, producers, editorial writers and cartoonists, with at least five years of full-time, professional experience in the news media.

The fellows attend mandatory seminars twice weekly, and each fellow pursues an independent study plan that involves auditing University of Michigan classes and working with a faculty advisor. International travel is an important part of the fellowship, with annual trips to Argentina, Brazil, and Turkey.

Fellows are given a stipend of $90,000 plus $5,000 for relocation, paid in monthly installments from September to April. The fellowship home is at the Wallace House in Ann Arbor, Michigan.

== History ==
The National Endowment for the Humanities Journalism Fellowship, funded by the NEH and modeled on Harvard's Nieman Fellowship, was established in 1973. The founding director was Ben L. Yablonky (1910–1991), a labor activist and University of Michigan journalism professor (as well as a former Nieman Fellow). The first class consisted of 12 fellows. The fellowship program was initially run out of the University of Michigan journalism department, and operated out of a two-room suite in the University's Henry Simmons Frieze Building. In 1979, the UMich journalism department was disbanded, and the fellowship was moved to the auspices of the university's Literature, Science and Art department.

In 1980, Graham B. Hovey (1916–2010), a former New York Times journalist, succeeded Jablonky as program director, serving until 1986. (The program hosts an annual lecture named in Hovey's honor and delivered by a former fellow; 2015 was the 30th Graham Hovey Lecture.) In 1984, the program was renamed Journalists in Residence.

Charles R. Eisendrath, a former fellowship recipient (1974–1975) and Time magazine staff writer, had joined the University of Michigan's faculty after his fellowship, directing its master’s program in journalism. In 1981 he became founding director of the Livingston Awards, also run out of the University of Michigan. In 1984, Eisendrath joined a committee (led by the John S. and James L. Knight Foundation) to increase the program's endowment, which was gradually losing its NEH support under the presidency of Ronald Reagan. Eisendrath took over as program director in 1986 upon Hovey's retirement. At that point the program's endowment was down to $30,000. The Washington Post's publisher, Katharine Graham, was an early donor, as was the Knight Foundation. In 1987, the program was renamed the Michigan Journalism Fellowship.

Eisendrath also recruited the assistance of renowned journalist (and University of Michigan alumnus) Mike Wallace, who became an active proponent of and financial donor to the program. In 1992, Wallace and his wife Mary donated the Arts and Crafts-era Wallace House to the program, which became its headquarters, and in 1995, Wallace gave the program $1 million. Wallace made regular appearances at Wallace House, giving seminars and meeting with fellows, until shortly before his death in 2012. By this time, the fellowship was being administered by the University's Horace H. Rackham School of Graduate Studies.

In 2002, the Knight Foundation awarded a $5 million challenge to the program, establishing fellowships for international journalists (which usually include journalists from Argentina's Clarín and Brazil's Folha de S. Paulo, in exchange for their organization's hosting work on the fellowship trips). Mike Wallace provided $1 million in matching funds, and the program was renamed the Knight-Wallace Fellowship.

Since 2012, the fellowship has been administered by the University Provost's office. Its current endowment is $60 million, with a yearly operating cost of about $2.3 million.

In 2015, the fellowship program and the Livingston Awards were rebranded as Wallace House.

In October 2015, after nearly 30 years as director, KWF director Charles R. Eisendrath announced his retirement, effective July 1, 2016. A search committee led by journalist Ken Auletta and University of Michigan Engineering professor Thomas Zurbuchen selected his replacement. In April 2016, former KWF fellow (2009) Lynette Clemetson was named next director of Wallace House.

=== Factfinding trips ===
Before becoming fully endowed, the program would travel to Toronto and meet with the Massey College Journalism fellows, to Chicago to meet with Chicago Tribune journalists, and to Atlanta to visit CNN.

The program began traveling to Buenos Aires, Argentina, in 2000, and added a component in São Paulo, Brazil, in 2009. An annual trip to Istanbul, Turkey, was added in 2005. (In 2009 and 2010 the program went to Moscow, Russia; instead of Istanbul.) In 2013 a trip to Alberta, Canada, became part of the program. In 2016, the program made its first trip to South Korea, and in 2019, fellows visited Puerto Rico.

== Program structure ==
Between 18 and 20 fellowships are awarded annually; generally 12 to Americans and 6 to 8 to foreign journalists. (Relationships with the BBC, Argentina's newspaper Clarín, Brazil's Folha de S. Paulo, and South Korea's Shinyoung Journalism Fund of the Kwanhun Club guarantee international fellows from the above newspapers.)

Specific fellowships include:

- David B. Burke Fellowship in General Studies
- Time Warner Fellowship for Minority Journalists
- Mike Wallace Fellowship in Investigative Reporting
- Benjamin R. Burton Fellowship in Broadcast Journalism
- Ford Fellowship in Transportation Technology and Environment
- Karsten Prager Fellowship in International Reporting
- Benny Friedman Fellowship in Sports Journalism
- William C. Richardson Fellowship for Public Policy and Philanthropy
- Knight Specialty Reporting Fellowships
  - Business/Economics — co-funded by the University of Michigan's Ross School of Business
  - Education
  - Law — co-funded by the University of Michigan Law School
  - Medicine/Health Sciences — co-funded by the University of Michigan Medical Center

While the program initially limited its fellowships to full-time salaried journalists, in the 2010s, as the journalism industry went through so many changes, it increasingly began opening its doors to freelancers.

The program specifies that funders have no input on the selection of the endowed fellowships.

Current Knight-Wallace board members include Jill Abramson, Jeff Fager, Charles Gibson (1974), Clarence Page, and Michele Norris. Former board members include Mike Wallace and David E. Davis.

=== Stipend ===
In 2000, fellows received a stipend of $40,000.

In 2003 and 2004, fellows received a $55,000 stipend. In 2017, KWF fellows received a $70,000 stipend. In 2023, the annual stipend was $85,000, plus $5,000 for relocation as well as university tuition and health insurance.

The current stipend is $90,000.

== Notable Knight-Wallace Fellows ==
- Charles Eisendrath (1974) — journalist, professor, and inventor; KWF director from 1986 to 2015
- Charles Gibson (1974) — broadcast television anchor and journalist
- Jim Russell (1974) — radio producer
- Henry Allen (1976) — Pulitzer Prize-winner for photography criticism
- David Suter (1978) — editorial illustrator
- Barry Bearak (1981) — Pulitzer Prize-winning correspondent
- Frank Browning (1985) — radio correspondent
- Dan Gillmor (1987) — technology writer and columnist
- Gary Pomerantz (1987) — sports reporter
- Russell Carollo (1990) — Pulitzer Prize-winning investigative journalist
- Holman W. Jenkins, Jr. (1992) — columnist and editorial writer
- Michael Vitez (1995) — Pulitzer Prize-winning journalist and author
- Dan Froomkin (1996) — Washington correspondent and blogger
- Tom Stanton (1996) — nonfiction author and editor
- Monte Reel (1999) — journalist and author
- Mike Baker (2000) — BBC writer and presenter
- Matilde Sánchez (2003) — Argentine journalist, writer, and translator
- Sue Nelson (2004) — science writer and broadcaster
- John U. Bacon (2005) — sports and business commentator
- Faye Flam (2005) — science writer
- Gerard Ryle (2006) — ICIJ Director
- Elena Milashina (2009) Russian investigative journalist for Novaya Gazeta
- Richard Deitsch (2009) — sports reporter and sports media critic
- Harry Siegel (2011) — editor and editorial writer
- Amber Hunt (2012) — journalist and true-crime author
- Nick Perry (2012) — Pulitzer Prize-winning journalist and author
- Kate Brooks (2013) — photojournalist
- Donovan Hohn (2013) — author and essayist
- Josh Neufeld (2013) — comics journalist
- Bastian Obermayer (2017) — German journalist who first wrote about the Panama Papers
- Azi Paybarah (2018) — New York-based journalist who focuses on local politics
- Emilio Gutiérrez (2018) — U.S.-based Mexican journalist
- Jaeah Lee (2021) — independent American journalist who writes primarily about justice, race, and labor in America
- Kunal Majumder (2024) — journalist and academic

== See also ==
- John S. Knight Fellowship (Stanford)
- Knight-Bagehot Fellowship (Columbia)
- Nieman Fellowships (Harvard)
- Livingston Award
- Knight Science Journalism program (Massachusetts Institute of Technology aka KSJ@MIT)
- International Center for Journalists Knight International Journalism Fellowships
