= This Land (podcast) =

Political podcast about Indigenous rights

- Genre: Political; True Crime
- Language: English

Cast and voices
- Hosted by: Rebecca Nagle

Production
- Length: Variable (29–38 minutes)

Technical specifications
- Audio format: Podcast (via streaming or downloadable MP3)

Publication
- No. of seasons: 2
- No. of episodes: 16
- Original release: June 3, 2019
- Provider: Crooked Media; Cadence13

Related
- Related shows: Red Man Laughing; Toasted Sister; All My Relations; Up and Vanished
- Website: crooked.com/podcast-series/this-land/

This Land is an American political podcast produced and distributed by Crooked Media and Cadence13, and hosted by Rebecca Nagle. The podcast debuted on June 3, 2019 and follows the United States Supreme Court case Sharp v. Murphy (previously known as Carpenter v. Murphy). In addition, the podcast discusses various Native issues such as land rights, sovereignty issues, and the Indian Child Welfare Act.

== History ==
In 1999, Patrick Dwayne Murphy stabbed George Jacobs and left him to die on the side of the road. Both men were members of the Muscogee Nation. Murphy's public defender, Lisa McCalmont, argued that the murder took place on Muscogee land, which meant that the State of Oklahoma did not have jurisdiction over the case. The State argued that the reservation no longer existed due to allotment. At the time of the podcast's recording, the case was awaiting a decision at the Supreme Court that would determine if the reservation still existed. The land in dispute is 19 million acres and is approximately half of the state of Oklahoma. In addition to the Muscogee Nation, the land in dispute impacts the Cherokee, Chickasaw, Choctaw, and Seminole nations. The case was eventually decided in favor of the Muscogee Nation, and was the largest restoration of tribal land in United States history.

Nagle wrote an op-ed article about Sharp v. Murphy for The Washington Post in November 2018, when oral arguments for the case were heard in the Supreme Court. Crooked Media read the article, and reached out to ask Nagle if she was interested in collaborating on a podcast. Nagle is a member of Cherokee Nation. Several other members of the crew are also Native. Nagle won the 2020 American Mosaic Journalism Prize for work on This Land.

== Awards and honors ==
- 2021: Season 2 of the podcast was nominated for a Peabody Award

== See also ==
- Political podcast
- List of American crime podcasts
- List of Native American podcasts
