= Project 562 =

- Founded: 2012
- Founder: Matika Wilbur
- Type: Indigenous
- Location: United States
- Region served: Indian Country
- Website: Project 562

Project 562 is a photography project by Matika Wilbur, in which the artist is documenting and depicting at least one contemporary Native American person from each of the 562 currently recognized Tribal Nations in the United States.

== Description ==
Project 562 began in 2012 as a photographic documentary focusing on Indigenous American tribal members. The name is derived from the 562 federally recognized tribes in the United States at the time of the project's conception in 2012. As of 2024 the number of federally recognized tribes in the US has increased to 574.

The artist herself, Matika Wilbur, is a member of both the Swinomish and Tulalip Nations in Washington State. Wilbur describes the project as "[addressing and remedying] historical inaccuracies, stereotypical representations, and absence of Native American images and voices in mass media and the national consciousness".

The concept of a "vanishing race" was originally introduced by Edward S. Curtis in the early 1900s to document Native American people before their communities and cultures disappeared. Wilbur describes Project 562 as engaging with Curtis' work. In an interview with The New York Times, Wilbur said, "I can see the importance of Curtis' work, but the inaccuracy of how we are portrayed just doesn't seem fair." Wilbur's book Project 562: Changing the Way We See Native America was published in April 2023 by Ten Speed Press.

== Partners and affiliates ==
Additional Team Members:

- Jessica Harjo, San Carlos Apache
- Marlon Footracer, Diné from Tsé Síaní (Lupton, Arizona)
- Bethany Yellowtail, member of Apsaalooke and Northern Cheyenne nations.
- Deidra Peaches, Navajo

== Funding ==
Wilbur launched her first Kickstarter campaign to pay for her travels. She raised $35,000. Her second Kickstarter campaign resulted in $54,000 of additional funds to continue her journey. In addition to these funds, which served "almost solely as gas and film" money, she relied heavily on the support of tribes she visited who fed her, housed her, and prayed with her".

== Influence ==
Wilbur's work on Project 562 has been featured in The Guardian, and O, The Oprah Magazine. In 2014, Wilbur gave a talk about Project 562 at a TED conference. In her interview with The Guardian, Wilbur said "I'm ultimately doing this because our perception matters ... Our perception fuels racism. It fuels segregation. Our perception determines the way we treat each other." In a TEDx Talk Wilbur gave in 2014, she describes how indigenous Americans are portrayed within mass media citing that between 1990 and 2000 there were 5,868 blockbuster release films of which:

12 included of American Indians. All of them showed Indians as spiritual or in-tune with nature. 10 of them as impoverished and/or beaten down by society. 10 as continually in conflict with whites. However, the image of the professional photographer, the musician, the teacher, the doctor, they were largely absent ... If society only sees us as these images, it means that our modern issues don't exist ... How can we be seen as modern, successful people, if we are continually represented as the leathered and feathered, vanishing race?

== Exhibitions ==
The inaugural exhibition of Project 562, titled Photographic Presence and Contemporary Indians: Matika Wilbur's Project 562, featuring 40 of Wilbur's Native American portraits as well as audio narratives from select sitters, debuted at the Tacoma Art Museum in 2014. Since then, Project 562 has been featured in exhibitions at the Hibulb Cultural Center, Anne Kittrell Art Gallery at University of Arkansas, Barrett Art Gallery at Santa Monica College, and Tidelands Gallery. In 2022, an outdoor exhibition of Project 562, facilitated by Photoville, was presented at Times Square in New York City.
