= Nadja Drost =

Canadian journalist

- Born: Canada
- Occupation: Journalist
- Awards: Pulitzer Prize for Feature Writing
- Website: nadjadrost.com

External videos
- America Ferrera Presents Desperate Journey with a Peabody Award, Peabody awards, June 18, 2021

Nadja Drost is a Canadian journalist who has worked from New York City and Bogotá, Colombia. She is a PBS Newshour special correspondent for Latin America and has been published in Time, Maclean’s, The Globe and Mail and Al Jazeera America, Her stories have been broadcast on the CBC, BBC, Radio Ambulante and National Public Radio.

In 2017, Drost was a co-recipient of The Robert Spiers Benjamin Award for "best reporting in any medium on Latin America" from the Overseas Press Club of America, for Fight for Peace, a PBS NewsHour piece reporting on FARC guerrillas in Colombia.

In 2021, Drost won the Pulitzer Prize for feature writing for the story "When can we really rest?", published in the California Sunday Magazine (which closed in October 2020). It is extremely rare for a freelance journalist to win a Pulitzer. For the story, Drost spent five days in the Darién Gap, an undeveloped area of rainforest and marshland on the border between Colombia and Panama, interviewing and following migrants who were crossing the region. It is considered one of the longest and most dangerous human migration routes in the world.

Drost is a co-recipient with the videographer Bruno Federico of a 2021 Peabody Award, for the report "Desperate Journey" on PBS NewsHour. At the 87th National Headliner Awards she won The Best in Show Television award for "Desperate Journey" and first place for magazine feature writing by an individual on a variety of subjects for "When can we really rest?". Drost also received an Honorable Mention from the American Society of Journalists and Authors (ASJA) at the 2021 Annual Writing Awards for "When can we really rest?".

"Desperate Journey" also received an Emmy Award from the National Academy of Television Arts & Sciences in 2021, https://pulitzercenter.org/blog/emmys-honor-grantees-reports-deadly-migrant-trek making Drost the only Canadian journalist to have won all three of the prestigious Pulitzer, Peabody and Emmy awards.

Drost is a graduate of the Stabile Center for Investigative Journalism at Columbia University Graduate School of Journalism.
