= Cerise Castle =

American journalist

- Born: California, U.S.
- Education: Emerson College
- Occupation: Journalist
- Years active: 2014–present
- Notable work: "A Tradition of Violence: The History of Deputy Gangs in the Los Angeles County Sheriff’s Department"

Cerise Castle is an American journalist. She received the IWMF Courage in Journalism Award and the American Mosaic Journalism Prize for her investigative series on deputy gangs in the Los Angeles County Sheriff's Department.

== Career ==
Castle previously worked as an associate producer for Vice News Tonight. In 2020 she was hired as a producer at KCRW. While reporting a Los Angeles George Floyd protest in May 2020, Castle was shot with a rubber bullet by LAPD. During her rehabilitation, she spent six months investigating the history of deputy gangs in the Los Angeles County Sheriff's Department (LACSD).

Castle accepted a buyout to leave her position at KCRW in February 2021. In a statement posted to Twitter and an interview on LA Podcast, she stated she had experienced racist microaggressions during her time as an employee.

In March 2021, she published her LACSD gangs series, "A Tradition of Violence: The History of Deputy Gangs in the Los Angeles County Sheriff’s Department" in Knock LA. Her reporting stated that multiple gangs are active in the department and alleged that gang members have killed 19 men of color around Los Angeles. One month after the series was published, Castle was detained at an LACSD press conference while reporting the event. A year after publication, the city's civilian oversight board launched an investigation into the deputy gangs. She was targeted for surveillance by the Los Angeles County Sheriff's Department. She stated that she also received death threats for her reporting.

In 2022 she received the American Journalism Online Award for Best Use of Public Records and the IWMF Courage in Journalism Award for the series. In 2023 she received the American Mosaic Journalism Prize for her reporting, an award for freelance journalists.

Castle has freelanced for the Daily Beast, the Los Angeles Times, LA Magazine, and multiple podcasts. Her freelance reporting broke the story of the Citizen app's misidentification of an arson suspect. Her reporting has been cited by Newsweek, LA Weekly, and The Ringer. In late February, 2023, it was announced Castle had signed with CAA. In March 2024 she was hired as a staff writer for California-based nonprofit publication Capital & Main.

== Personal life ==
Castle was raised in southern California. In 2014 she moved to Los Angeles after completing her bachelor's degree at Emerson College to become a freelance reporter.

She is a lesbian.

== Accolades ==
=== 2022 ===
- International Women's Media Foundation, Courage in Journalism Award
- American Journalism Online Award for Best Use of Public Records

=== 2023 ===
- American Mosaic Journalism Prize

== Works ==
- "A Tradition of Violence: The History of Deputy Gangs in the Los Angeles County Sheriff's Department". Knock LA. 2023-07-17.
- Castle, Cerise (2024-07-17). "I wrote the history of LASD gangs. Then the sheriff's department started surveilling me". LA Public Press.
