= Matilde Sánchez =

Argentine journalist, writer, and translator

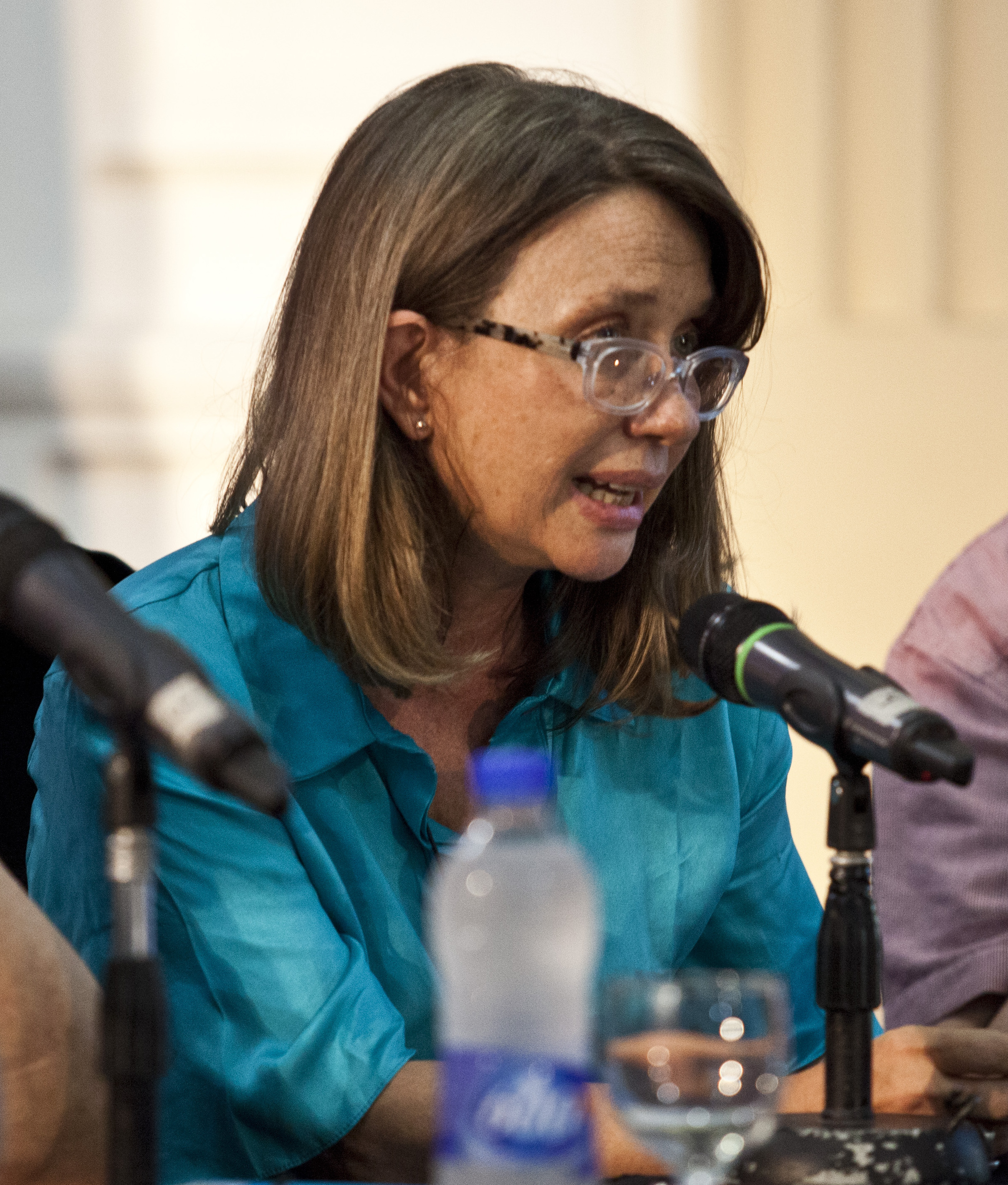
- At "La Letra Argentina" in 2014
- Born: 1958 (age 67–68); Buenos Aires, Argentina
- Education: Escuela Superior de Comercio Carlos Pellegrini
- Occupations: Journalist, writer, translator
- Children: Valentín Pauls

Matilde Sánchez (born 1958) is an Argentine journalist, writer, and translator. Beginning in 1982 she developed a prolific career in the field of cultural journalism. She edited the Culture and Nation supplement of the newspaper Clarín, as well as Ñ Magazine.

== Professional career ==
Matilde Sánchez studied at the Escuela Superior de Comercio Carlos Pellegrini. Her first work was a biography of Hebe de Bonafini. In 1992 she published her first novel, La ingratitud, dedicated to her father and that takes place in Berlin. The subject of travel is recurrent in her work, and according to writer Silvia Hopenhayn, "appears as a fundamental experience" from her first novels.

Her works have received favorable criticism from other writers, such as the Mexican Carlos Fuentes, who rated La ingratitud, El dock, and El desperdicio as particularly notable, and Beatriz Sarlo, who wrote about La ingratitud: "It's a text notable for its intelligence, for the steadfast security of writing without hesitation, and for the ability to exhibit a drama of feelings with the same distance as observing a foreign city." Daniel Link, in turn, described her in his personal blog as one of the best writers of her generation. The writer Miguel Vitagliano opined that El dock was the best novel of the 1990s.

== Works ==
=== Fiction ===
- La ingratitud (1992). Novel originally published by Editorial A. Korn and reissued in 2011 by Editorial Mardulce.
- El Dock (1993). Novel. Editorial Planeta.
- La canción de las ciudades (1999). Travel stories published by Seix Barral.
- El desperdicio (2007). Novel. Editorial Alfaguara.
- Los daños materiales (2011). Penguin Random House Grupo Editorial Argentina.

=== Nonfiction ===
- Historias de vida (1985). Biography of Hebe de Bonafini. Editorial Nuevo Extremo.
- Las reglas del secreto (1993). Annotated anthology of the work of Silvina Ocampo. Economic Culture Fund.
- Evita, imágenes de una pasión. Report. Editorial Planeta.
- Sueño rebelde. Report about Che Guevara. Editorial Icaria.

== Awards and fellowships ==
- 1992 (1st finalist) Premio Planeta de Novela for El dock
- 1994 Guggenheim Fellowship
- 2003 Knight-Wallace Fellowship (University of Michigan)

== Personal life ==
Matilde Sánchez's eldest son is the rock journalist Valentín Pauls, from her relationship with Cristian Pauls.
