= Emilio Gutiérrez (journalist) =

Mexican journalist

Emilio Gutiérrez Soto
- Born: c. 1963
- Children: 1

Emilio Gutiérrez Soto (born c. 1963) is a U.S.-based Mexican journalist. He formerly worked for El Diario de el Noreste. After reporting on allegations of corruption in the Mexican Army, and reportedly receiving death threats, Gutiérrez fled to the United States with his son in 2008. He was the recipient of the 2017 John Aubuchon Press Freedom Award from the National Press Club. He is a 2018-2019 Knight-Wallace Journalism Fellow at the University of Michigan, despite being denied asylum on multiple occasions.

== Early life and career in Mexico ==
Gutiérrez was born c. 1963. He became a reporter for El Diario de el Noreste, for which he wrote articles about allegations of corruption among the Mexican Army in Chihuahua.

== Asylum in the United States ==
Gutiérrez reportedly received death threats for his reporting in Mexico and he fled to the United States with his son, where he sought asylum at the Antelope Wells Port of Entry on June 16, 2008.

In December 2017, Gutiérrez's request for asylum was denied, which is, according to Gutiérrez, almost a death sentence for him. Organizations like Reporters Without Borders, the National Press Club and the Society of Professional Journalists vehemently opposed the court's decision. Gutiérrez was sent to a detention facility in Sierra Blanca, Texas, during his appeal.

Gutiérrez was awarded the John Aubuchon Press Freedom Award by the National Press Club on December 18, 2017, "on behalf of Mexico's besieged journalists." The ceremony was held remotely, by video conference. He was released from detention with his son in July 2018.

In July 2018, Gutiérrez became a Knight-Wallace Journalism Fellow at the University of Michigan in Ann Arbor for the 2018-2019 academic year. On February 28, 2019, Texas Judge Robert Hough ordered Gutiérrez's deportation once again, arguing the decade-long hiatus since the publication of his articles would protect him. In March 2019, Republican Congressman Fred Upton and Democratic Congresswoman Debbie Dingell asked the U.S. Immigration and Customs Enforcement not to deport Gutiérrez in a letter. A few days later, Gutiérrez spoke about his experience at an event on campus in Spanish.

Gutiérrez Soto eventually was awarded asylee status in March 2024. Judge Nathan Herbert granted asylum to both Gutiérrez Soto and his son Oscar.

== Personal life ==
Gutiérrez has a son, Oscar (born c. 1993).
