= Cindi Leive =

American magazine editor

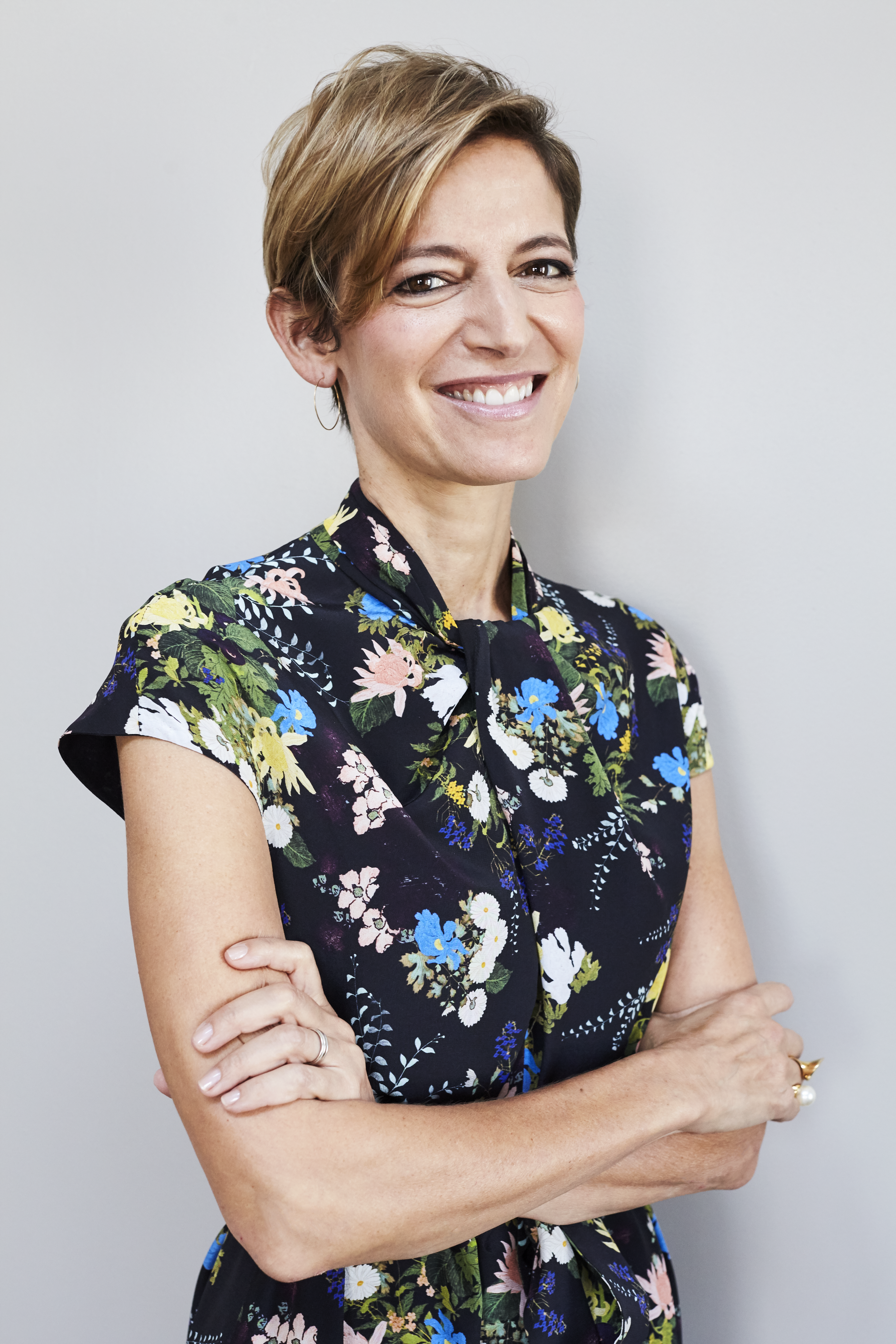
Cindi Leive

Cynthia Leive (/ˌlɛvi/ L-Ɛ-v-i; born January 21, 1967) is a journalist, media leader and advocate for women. She is the CEO of the media company The Meteor, a podcast host, the former editor-in-chief of both Glamour and Self magazines, and the author or producer of numerous books including the 2018 New York Times bestseller "Together We Rise," about the making of the March for Women's Lives. Leive has interviewed heads of state, Hollywood and fashion's biggest personalities, and iconic leaders from all walks of life. She is also a senior fellow at the USC Annenberg School for Communication and Journalism.

== Career ==
Leive's career began at The Paris Review, where she was an intern while still a student at Swarthmore College. After graduating, Leive took an editorial assistant position at Glamour and worked alongside Ruth Whitney, who was at the helm of the magazine for 31 years. After 11 years, Leive left Glamour as deputy editor and joined Self magazine as editor-in-chief. During Leive's tenure, Self’s circulation increased by eleven percent. Leive rejoined Glamour magazine as editor-in-chief in 2001. She was behind creation and success of glamour.com which together with the magazine reach one out of every eight American women, with 9.7 million print readers and 11 million unique users online. Under her stewardship, the magazine launched a monthly digital edition, popular special editions, apps, and books—including two New York Times best-sellers; Lipstick.com, Glamour’s stand-alone beauty site, and Condé Nast's first-ever digital spin-off; a digital video network featuring original programming inspired by Glamour in partnership with Condé Nast Entertainment. Leive also founded The Girl Project to support girls’ education, making Glamour the first women's media brand with a nonprofit initiative.

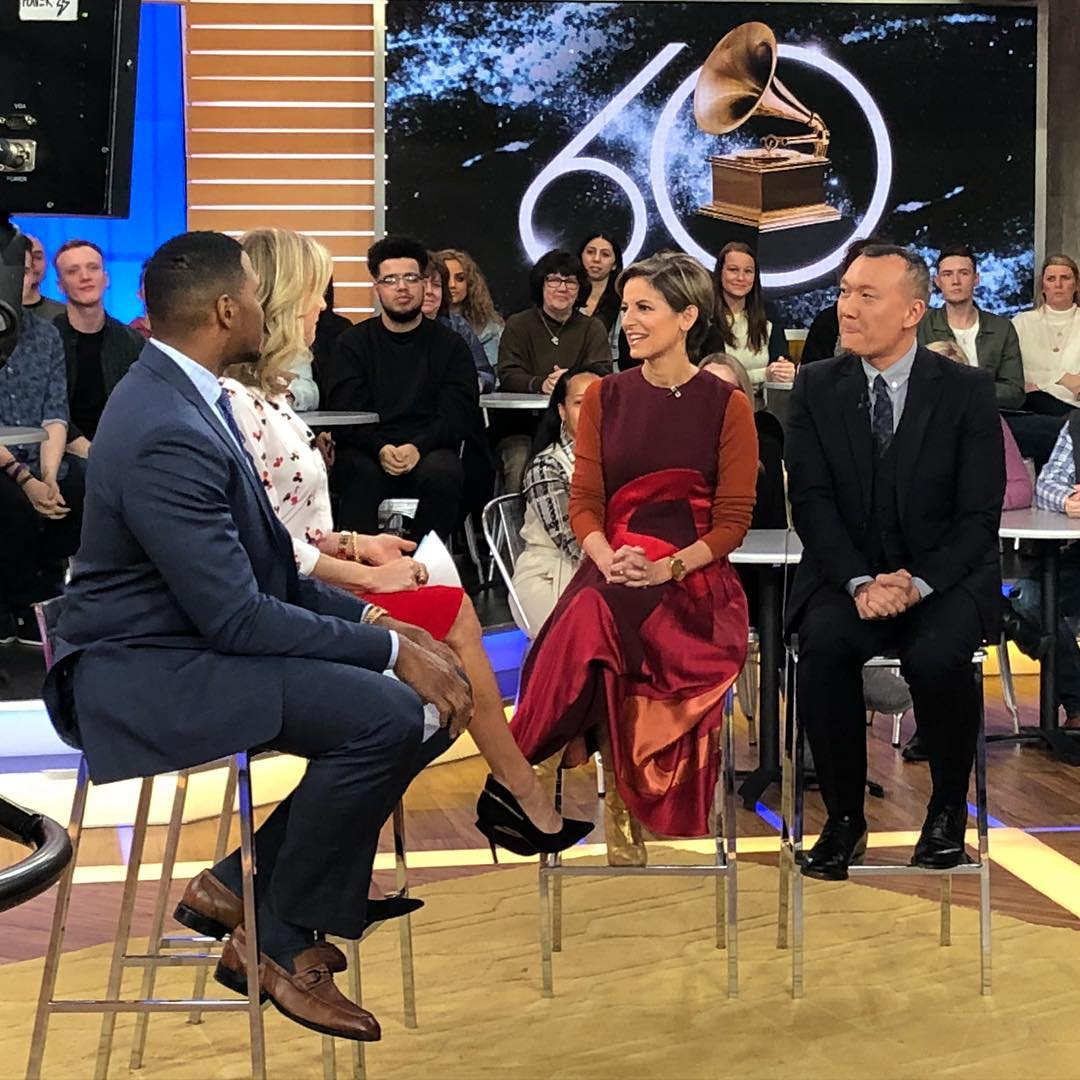
Cindi Leive appearance on Good Morning America

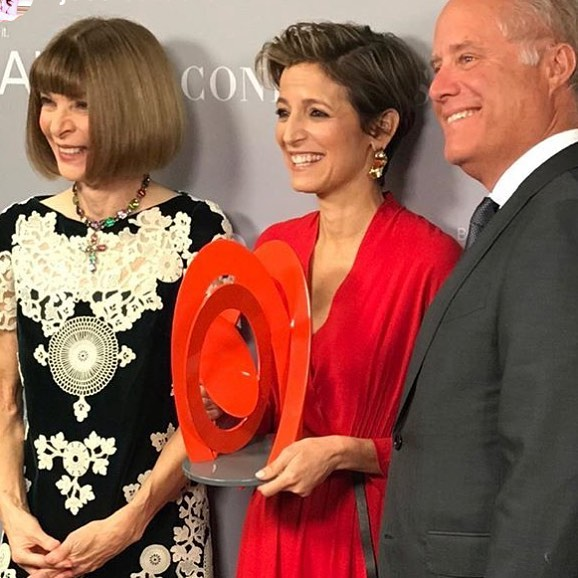
Cindi Leive with her Woman of the Year Award (2017)

She serves on the board of directors for The International Women’s Media Foundation and is a former president of the American Society of Magazine Editors. Leive is a board member of Swarthmore College (her alma mater), as well as the Brooklyn Public Library.

In 2022, Leive served as a judge for that year's American Mosaic Journalism Prize.

== Achievements ==
In 2002, Crain's put Leive on its "Top 40 Under 40" list. After 16 years at the helm of Glamour, Leive announced she would be leaving by the end 2017. For her outstanding service to the magazine, publishing industry, and women around the world, she received Glamour's biggest honor - a Woman of the Year Award. Among women who celebrated Leive's accomplishments were former first ladies Hillary Clinton and Michelle Obama, former long-time president of Planned Parenthood Cecile Richards, and Vogue's editor-in-chief Anna Wintour.

== Personal life ==
Leive was born to a Jewish family in McLean, Virginia. A 1988 graduate of Swarthmore College, Leive was an English literature major and minored in religion. Leive lives in New York City with her husband, film producer Howard Bernstein, her daughter, Lucy, and her son, Isaac.
