= Frank Browning (author) =

American writer

Frank Browning is an American author and former correspondent for National Public Radio. The author of seven books, his work has appeared in the Washington Post Magazine, the LA Times, Mother Jones, Playboy, Penthouse, Salon and numerous other publications. He has also reported for Marketplace and This American Life.

== Biography ==
Raised on an apple orchard in Kentucky, Browning has lived in Washington, D.C., New York City, San Francisco, California, Los Angeles, California, and Ann Arbor, Michigan and Brooklyn, New York.

Browning began his work on newspapers in Kentucky, then undertook investigative reporting for the muckraking magazine Ramparts. He worked as a staff correspondent and contract reporter for National Public Radio, where he won two Armstrong Awards for his reporting, and coordinated with fellow journalist Brenda Wilson a multi-part series on AIDS in black America that won a Dupont-Columbia prize. He was a 1985–1986 Michigan Journalism Fellow.

He is also co-author with Sharon Silva of a cookbook, An Apple Harvest: Recipes and Orchard Lore.

He has lived in France since 2001, and has written for HuffPost; he contributes to a number of American magazines, including California Magazine.

== Bibliography ==
- Browning, Frank; Gerassi, John (1980), The American Way of Crime: From Salem to Watergate, Putnam, ISBN 978-0-399-11906-4
- Browning, Frank (1993), The Culture of Desire: Paradox and Perversity in Gay Lives Today, Crown, ISBN 978-0-517-58192-6
- Browning, Frank (1996), A Queer Geography: Journeys Toward a Sexual Self, ISBN 978-0-517-59857-3
- Browning, Frank (1998), Apples: Story of the Fruit of Temptation, North Point Press, ISBN 978-0-86547-537-3
- Browning, Frank; Silva, Sharon (2004), An Apple Harvest: Recipes and Orchard Lore, Ten Speed Press, ISBN 978-1580081047
- Browning, Frank (2010), The Monk and the Skeptic: Dialogues on Sex, Faith and Religion, Softskull
- Browning, Frank (2016), The Fate of Gender: Nature, Nurture and the Human Future, Bloomsbury, ISBN 978-1-62040-619-9
