= Columbus New Mexico Port of Entry =

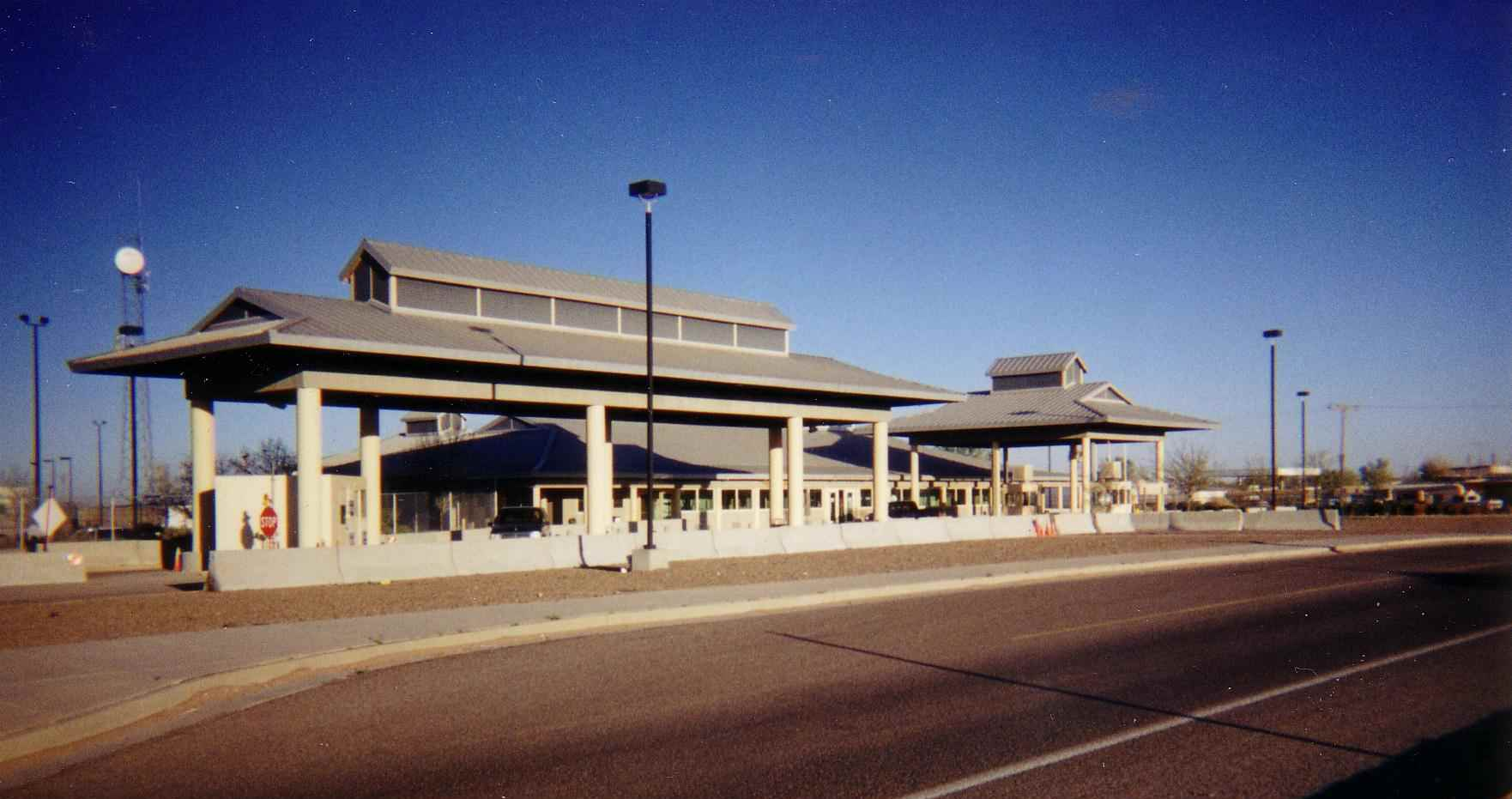
- Columbus New Mexico Port of Entry, June, 2001

Location
- Country: United States
- Location: NM 11, Columbus, New Mexico, 88029
- Coordinates: 31.784399°N 107.627622°W

Details
- Opened: 1902

Statistics
- 2011 Cars: 296,234 (Columbus data includes Antelope Wells)
- 2011 Trucks: 9,258
- Pedestrians: 236,862

Website
- http://www.cbp.gov/xp/cgov/toolbox/contacts/ports/nm/2406.xml

The Columbus New Mexico Port of Entry is an international border crossing between Columbus, New Mexico, United States, and Palomas, Chihuahua, Mexico. Located at the southern terminus of New Mexico State Road 11 (NM 11), it is one of three border crossings into New Mexico, along with the Antelope Wells Port of Entry and the Santa Teresa Port of Entry.

The US government first built a customs inspection station in Columbus in 1902. In 1916, that building was damaged during a raid by bandits led by Pancho Villa. The building has been refurbished and stands as part of Pancho Villa State Park.

After World War II, a one-story barracks (used by the personnel assigned to the U.S. Army's Air Base Columbus during the War) was moved to the southwest corner of the intersection of NM 11 (the Deming–Palomas road) and NM 9 (the Columbus–Hachita road). The first two rooms of this building were used by inspectors to inspect aliens who were applying for lawful admission to the US and to provide administrative workspace for the U.S. Immigration and Naturalization Service and the U.S. Border Patrol. In 1946, the remainder of the building was converted into living accommodations for one of the inspectors and his family. Three inspectors were assigned to the office, which was open initially from 8:00 a.m. to 8:00 p.m. and later from 6:00 a.m. to 10:00 p.m.

When Pancho Villa State Park was opened next to the site, a new Immigration and Customs building was built 3 miles (4.8 km) south at the border and the former office building and residence became a town library and public meeting room. From 1902 until this was done, a U.S. Customs Service inspection building stood on the northwest corner of the intersection of NM 9 and NM 11, and a house west of it was the residence for many years of Chief Customs Inspector Jack Breen and his wife Susie. That building is now a museum.

The current border inspection station was built by the General Services Administration (GSA) in 2018, which replaced the prior facility that was built in 1989.

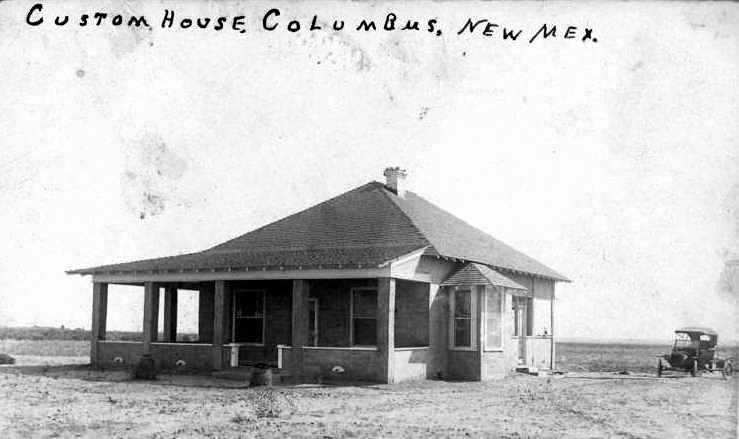
Original US Customs facility in Columbus in 1915, prior to the Villa raid.

== See also ==
- Media related to Columbus Port of Entry at Wikimedia Commons
- List of Mexico–United States border crossings
