= Rosanna Deerchild =

Canadian Cree writer and poet

- Born: O-Pipon-Na-Piwin Cree Nation
- Citizenship: Cree
- Occupation: CBC Radio Host
- Years active: 20
- Known for: Unreserved
- Notable work: "This is a small Northern Town" and "Calling Down the Sky"

Rosanna Deerchild (Ferguson) is a Canadian Cree writer, poet and radio host.

== Biography ==
Deerchild originates from South Indian Lake, Manitoba (Now called O-Pipon-Na-Piwin Cree Nation). She is a graduate of Red River College Polytechnic. She now lives in Winnipeg, Manitoba. In 2018, she was able to accomplish one of her dreams, which was to be an emcee in a powwow.

== Career ==
=== Media ===
Deerchild is best known as host of the radio program Unreserved on CBC Radio One, a show that shares the music, cultures, and stories from indigenous people across Canada, from 2014 to 2020. With CBC Radio One, she has hosted two other shows; The (204) and the Weekend Morning Show. She has also appeared on CBC Radio's DNTO. She has been on various other media networks: APTN, Global Television Network, and Native Communications (NCI-FM).

She left Unreserved in 2020 to host a new podcast series on indigenous history for the CBC, and was succeeded as host of Unreserved by Falen Johnson. In 2022, Deerchild made her acting debut as Chief Deedee in the CTV Comedy Channel sitcom Acting Good.

=== Literary career ===
Deerchild's poetry has appeared in a number of literary magazines including: Prairie Fire and CV2. Her work has been anthologized in Post-prairie: An Anthology of New Poetry (Talonbooks, 2005), Strong Women Stories: Native Vision and Community Survival (Sumach Press, 2003), and #NotYourPrincess (Annick Press, 2017).

She is the co-founder and remains a member of the Aboriginal Writers Collective established in 1999. The collective, a group of Manitoba writers, has released two collections in print, urban kool and Bone Memory, and a live spoken word CD, Red City. Rosanna has also performed live comedy and has written book reviews for the Winnipeg Free Press. Her first book, This is a Small Northern Town, is a full-length collection of poems that looks at a small northern town that is heavily divided along colour lines and holds long family secrets.

Deerchild's second book, Calling Down the Sky, is a deeply personal piece about Canada's Indigenous Residential Schools. This book is, in part, the product of a multi-year healing journey and tells the story of Deerchild's own mother and her struggles as a generational survivor of residential schools. This book also won the Lowther Memorial award in 2016.

Deerchild is also credited with contributions and editing of the book, Gush: Menstrual Manifestos for Our Times. Over 100 female and non-binary writers contributed, including Deerchild, and she was one of three editors.

Deerchild and her mother Edna Ferguson wrote a poetry book about her residential school experience together.

== Activism ==
In 2015, Deerchild appeared on the cover of Maclean's Magazine accompanied by the quote "They call me a stupid squaw, or tell me to go back to the rez". The magazine called Winnipeg Canada's most racist city and featured numerous Indigenous voices who had experienced racism. Following the release of the magazine Deerchild frequently spoke about racism, public perception, and Indigenous life in Winnipeg. Deerchild and her appearance in Maclean's Magazine, was recognized again when Brian Bowman, the mayor of Winnipeg in 2015, did not deny the level of racism in Winnipeg but encouraged the community to lead the eradication of racism in the nation.

== Awards and honours ==
- 2009: Aqua Books Lansdowne Prize for Poetry for full-length collection of poems this is a small northern town.
- 2019: Medium and the Light Award for bringing Indigenous and non-Indigenous people together through her work on Unreserved.
- 2022: Amnesty International Canada Media Award for Long-Form Radio, shared with Kim Kaschor and Erin Noel for the Unreserved episode "Reconciliation reality check with Murray Sinclair".
- 2024: Indigenous Media Award.
- 2025: Honorary doctorate in letters from the University of Winnipeg for her work in arts, media and Indigenous advocacy.
