= Unreserved =

- Genre: Radio talk show
- Running time: 54 minutes
- Country of origin: Canada
- Language: English
- Home station: CBC Radio One
- Hosted by: Rosanna Deerchild (2014–2020 2021–present); Falen Johnson (2020)
- Recording studio: Winnipeg, Manitoba, Canada
- Original release: September 2014 – present
- Audio format: Monophonic
- Website: Official website

Unreserved is a Canadian radio program, which airs weekly on CBC Radio One. The program is a documentary and interview series which profiles prominent Indigenous people in Canada.

The program debuted in September 2014, as a regional program airing in Manitoba, Saskatchewan, Nunavut, Yukon and the Northwest Territories. It was added to the full national schedule beginning August 30, 2015. Although CBC Radio has aired numerous short-run summer series on Indigenous culture in Canada, including ReVision Quest, New Fire and Trailbreakers, Unreserved is the network's first permanent regular-season series on First Nations issues and culture since The Dead Dog Café Comedy Hour concluded its run in 2000. It is hosted by Rosanna Deerchild.

Figures profiled on the series to date have included Murray Porter, Tantoo Cardinal, Nathaniel Arcand, Perry Bellegarde, Don Amero, Christa Couture, Paul Seesequasis and Candy Palmater.
