= Charles Eisendrath =

American journalist

- Born: October 9, 1940 (age 85); Chicago
- Citizenship: United States
- Education: Yale University
- Occupations: Time magazine journalist, professor, and inventor
- Known for: Time magazine & C-SPAN television
- Spouse: Julia Eisendrath

Charles R. Eisendrath (born October 9, 1940, in Chicago, Illinois) is an American journalist, professor and inventor.

He is most notable for being the director of the Knight-Wallace Fellowships at the University of Michigan, and credited with turning it into one of American journalism's most prestigious university programs. He is a long-time Time correspondent. He is also notable for his invention of a wood-burning grill called Grillworks.

Eisendrath is also an on-air contributor to C-SPAN television.

He received national attention in 1973 when he was the onsite reporter for Time in Santiago during the coup that overthrew the Marxist government of Salvador Allende, and securing the first ever post-coup interview with new dictator Augusto Pinochet.

== Career ==
After graduating in history at Yale, Eisendrath became a journalist, and reported for the St. Louis Post-Dispatch and Baltimore Evening Sun. Eisendrath then joined Time as a correspondent in Washington, London and Paris, eventually becoming bureau chief in Buenos Aires where he was responsible for all news operations in Hispanic South America.

His work has appeared on NPR and in The New York Times, The Wall Street Journal, the International Herald Tribune and The Atlantic. He has been a guest on ABC's Good Morning America and a commentator on National Public Radio's Morning Edition.

From 1975 to 2016 he was a professor at the University of Michigan where he founded Wallace House, which includes the Knight-Wallace Journalism Fellowships, one of the nation's leading mid-career professional journalism programs, and The Livingston Awards, widely known as "the Pulitzer Prize for the Young", raising $60 million endowment to permanently sustain the fellowships, and was founding director of the prizes.

== Personal ==
He and his wife, Julia, live in Ann Arbor and East Jordan, Michigan, have two sons, Benjamin Cardozo Eisendrath and Mark William Eisendrath, and three grandsons.

== Honors ==
- 1974 National Endowment for the Humanities Journalism Fellowship
- 1996 Selected for Who's Who in America
- 2014 Michigan Journalism Hall of Fame
- 2016 Richard M. Clurman Award for Distinguished Mentoring in Journalism
- Chairman of the Development Committee of the Center for Public Integrity
- Elected to the Council on Foreign Relations
- Pulitzer Prize International Jury
- Chairman of the American Board of the International Press Institute
- Tom Brokaw said "Charles Eisendrath has long been considered a reporter's reporter"
