= Antelope Wells Port of Entry =

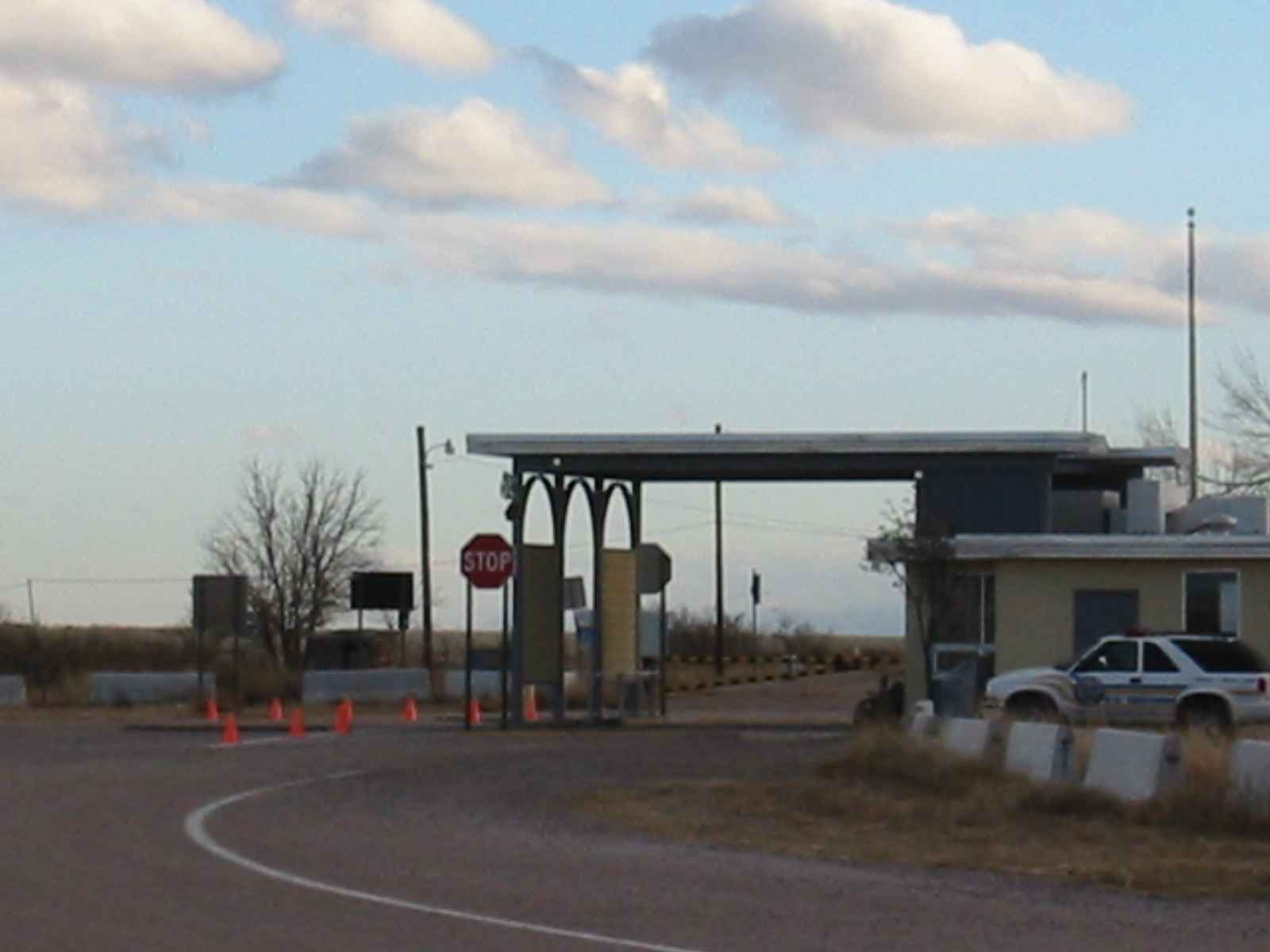
- Antelope Wells Port of Entry, December, 2001

Location
- Country: United States
- Location: NM 81, Antelope Wells, NM 88040
- Coordinates: 31.333719°N 108.530339°W

Details
- Opened: 1928

Statistics
- 2011 Cars: (The US government does not publish statistics for Antelope Wells)

Website
- http://www.nmborder.com/Antelope_Wells.aspx

The Antelope Wells Port of Entry is an international border crossing between Antelope Wells, New Mexico, United States, and El Berrendo, Chihuahua, Mexico. It is one of three border crossings into New Mexico, along with the Columbus Port of Entry and the Santa Teresa Port of Entry, and by far the most remote, located in the sparsely populated New Mexico Bootheel. The nearest towns, Janos, Chihuahua and Hachita, New Mexico, are both approximately 45 miles (72 km) away. The crossing is open daily from 10 a.m. to 4 p.m. Mountain Time and is staffed by a single U.S. Customs and Border Protection employee. The port of entry was temporarily closed on April 18, 2020 due to travel restrictions between the United States and Mexico due to the ongoing coronavirus pandemic. The port reopened on November 29, 2021.

Antelope Wells receives the least traffic of any Mexico–United States border crossing, so little that the CBP does not report official statistics for the facility. In 2017, the average traffic was estimated at 750–1000 personal vehicles per month, up from 200–500 five years earlier. In 2014, traffic was reported to sometimes be as low as four vehicles per day. Despite the light traffic volume, a new $11 million U.S. port of entry facility was built in 2013. Mexico has also worked to improve access to the crossing by paving the 6-mile (9.7 km) dirt access road connecting it to Federal Highway 2. However, it was reported in January 2017 that construction was on hold with about 1 mile (1.6 km) still consisting of a rutted dirt track.

The Antelope Wells border crossing was established in 1872 under President Ulysses S. Grant and was named after a nearby ranch. It has been staffed since 1928.

== Recreation ==
The Antelope Wells Port of Entry had served in the past as the southern terminus of the Continental Divide Trail; since the mid-1990s access to the divide at the US-Mexico border is restricted due to private ownership of the land by Diamond A Ranch. To avoid an extended road walk along Highway 81, the official beginning of the CDT is now at Crazy Cook, New Mexico northeast of Antelope Wells in the Big Hatchet Mountains.

== See also ==
- List of Mexico–United States border crossings
