= Rebecca Nagle =

Cherokee activist (born 1986)

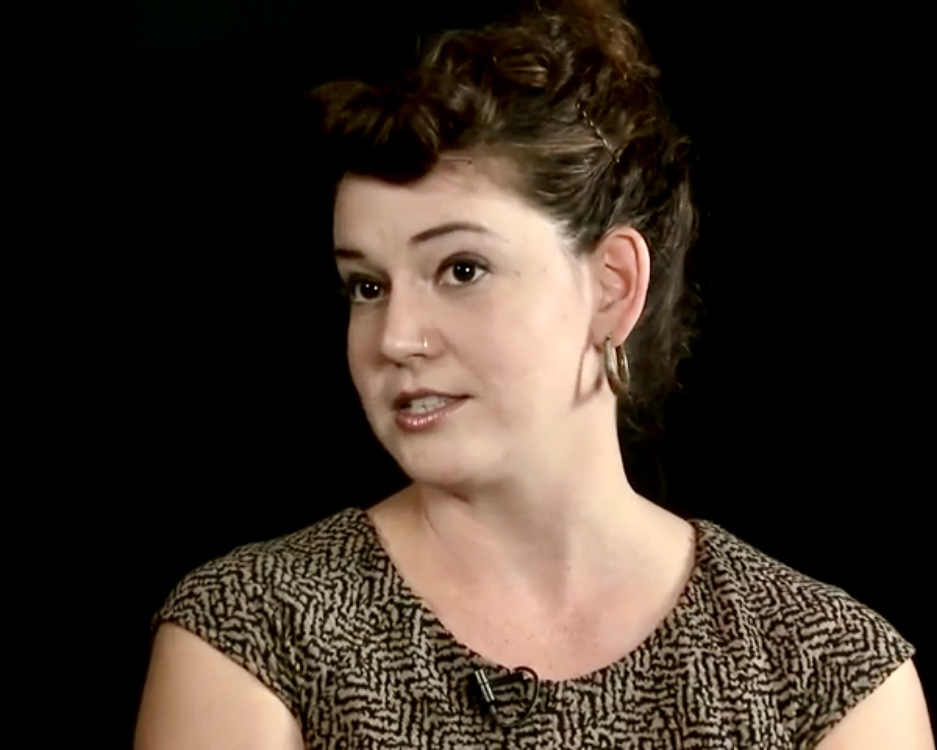
- Nagle on The Laura Flanders Show in 2014
- Born: June 12, 1986 (age 40); Joplin, Missouri, U.S.
- Citizenship: American; Cherokee Nation
- Education: Maryland Institute College of Art
- Occupations: Pundit, writer
- Years active: 2012–present
- Employer: Crooked Media
- Political party: Democratic
- Movement: Cherokee nationalism
- Relatives: Mary Kathryn Nagle (sister); Major Ridge (ancestor)

Rebecca Nagle is a Native American activist, writer, public speaker. She is a citizen of the Cherokee Nation. Nagle is one of the founders of FORCE: Upsetting Rape Culture, an organization led by artists and activists dedicated to promoting a culture of consent. Nagle has also served as a coordinator of the event "Pink Loves Consent."

== Career ==
In 2012, Rebecca Nagle and Hannah Brancato launched a website called "Pink Loves Consent," which coincided with the Victoria's Secret fashion show. The website was designed to resemble the Victoria's Secret website and featured underwear with anti-rape slogans such as "Consent is Sexy," "No Means No," and "Ask First." None of the items on the website were for sale; instead, it provided information about rape education. However, on December 4, 2012, lawyers representing Victoria's Secret forced the website to be taken down, citing customer confusion as the reason for their action.

As a part of Nagle's project to create a national monument for sexual assault survivors, FORCE: Upsetting Rape Culture released a giant floating poem in the Reflecting Pool in front of the Washington National Monument. The floating poem read: "I Can't Forget What Happened But No One Else Remembers." Alongside Hannah Brancato, co-founder of Force, Nagle created The Monument Quilt to establish “a public healing space by and for survivors of rape and abuse”. Over 1700 sexual assault survivors have contributed segments to this quilt.

In 2019, Nagle hosted the podcast This Land produced by Crooked Media, which was nominated for Peabody Award in 2021. The podcast focused on the case of Carpenter v. Murphy, a pending Supreme Court case to determine the land rights of various Indigenous groups in Oklahoma.

Nagle has been critical of Massachusetts Democratic senator Elizabeth Warren's claims of Cherokee ancestry, emphasizing that "[t]ribal affiliation and kinship determine Cherokee identity — not race or biology." She has spoken out about the issue in numerous print, television, and online media outlets.

== Recognition ==
In 2012 and 2013, Nagle was named one of Fast Company's 100 Most Creative People. Nagle was also named one of the National Center for American Indian Enterprise Development's 2016 Native American 40 Under 40. Nagle was named the 2016 Sondheim Art Prize recipient, and she was listed on the Yerba Buena Center for the Arts 2015 100 List for innovators and thought leaders. Nagle won the 2020 American Mosaic Journalism Prize for work on the podcast This Land and the Washington Post article “Half the land in Oklahoma could be returned to Native Americans. It should be.” In 2025, she won the Stubbendieck Great Plains Distinguished Book Prize.

== Works ==
- Nagle, Rebecca (2024-09-10). By the Fire We Carry. New York: Harper. ISBN 978-0-06-311204-9.

== Personal life ==
Nagle lives in Tahlequah, Oklahoma. Her sister is the attorney and playwright Mary Kathryn Nagle. Nagle identifies as a two–spirit woman and is an enrolled citizen of the Cherokee Nation. She is a survivor of child sexual abuse. Nagle is directly descended from 19th-century Cherokee leaders Major Ridge and John Ridge, who signed the Treaty of New Echota, which caused the Trail of Tears for the Cherokee people. She uses this ancestry to highlight points in parts of her podcast, This Land.
