= Falen Johnson =

Mohawk and Tuscarora playwright and broadcaster

- Born: Six Nations of the Grand River
- Education: George Brown College
- Occupations: Playwright, podcaster

Falen Johnson is a Mohawk and Tuscarora playwright and broadcaster from Canada.

== Personal life ==
Born in 1982, Johnson is from Six Nations of the Grand River and graduated from the George Brown Theatre School in 2005. She is a member of the bear clan. Johnson spent most of her formative years in Brantford, Ontario; she currently lives in Toronto.

== Work and education ==
She is the previous Coordinator of the Indigenous Performing Arts Alliance, a member-driven organization of professional Indigenous performing artists and arts organizations. IPAA serves as a collective voice for its members and for Indigenous performing arts in Canada. It provides leadership, support, representation, advocacy, and practical assistance for the national development of Indigenous performing arts.

== Playwright ==
Johnson's plays include Salt Baby, Two Indians, and Ipperwash. Her plays focus on contemporary Indigenous identity, navigating spaces as an Indigenous women, and colonial contexts.

Salt Baby was Johnson's first play and focused on the story of an Indigenous women navigating the differences between 'rez life' and the city. The play was semi-autobiographical and based on her experience living in Six Nations and Brantford, Ontario.

Johnson's play Two Indians is a dark comedy that explores the realities of being Indigenous in Canada. Following its publication in book form in 2021, Two Indians was a shortlisted finalist for the Governor General's Award for English-language drama at the 2021 Governor General's Awards.

She created Ipperwash (2018) in response to the Idle No More movement. This play is rooted in the history of the 1995 occupation of the Ipperwash Provincial Park and focuses on the relationship of two cousins and kinship ties. Ipperwash also marked Johnson's debut as a director and was created by working with member of the Stony Point Ojibway community.

Johnson is currently working with Soulpepper Theatre on a play about the life of residential school survivor and artist Shirley Horn.

== Podcasting ==
Johnson co-hosts the Canadian Broadcasting Corporation podcast, Secret Life of Canada with Leah-Simone Bowen. This podcast focuses on little known parts of Canadian history and explores the histories of marginalized communities in Canada. Johnson has also been featured on The Moth storytelling podcast.

In 2020, Johnson succeeded Rosanna Deerchild as host of CBC Radio's indigenous newsmagazine series Unreserved.

== Awards and recognition ==
Johnson was named one of the 20 people to watch in 2020 by Maclean's Magazine.

In 2019 Johnson won the best audio work award at the imagineNATIVE Film and Media Arts Festival. This award recognized her work on the Secret Life of Canada podcast.

As part of its Indigenous Arts Award Laureates program, the Ontario Arts Council awarded Johnson with the Emerging Artist Award in 2015.
