= The California Sunday Magazine =

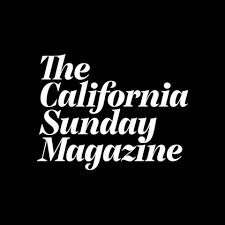
- Editor in Chief: Douglas McGray
- Frequency: Bi-monthly
- First issue: 5 October 2014
- Final issue: April 2020 (print); October 2020 (online)
- Company: Pop-Up Magazine Productions
- Country: United States
- Based in: San Francisco
- Language: English
- Website: californiasunday.com
- OCLC: 919092479

The California Sunday Magazine was a longform Sunday magazine featuring stories about the Western United States, Latin America, and Asia. In June 2021 it won a Pulitzer Prize, eight months after the magazine ceased publication. The prize was awarded in feature writing for a story on refugees and potential immigrants crossing the Darién Gap by freelance writer Nadja Drost.

== History ==
The California Sunday Magazine was founded in October 2014 by Douglas McGray and Chas Edwards. The first issue was delivered to 400,000 households as an insert with the Sunday editions of the Los Angeles Times, The New York Times, the Sacramento Bee, the San Francisco Chronicle, and The San Diego Union-Tribune.

In 2016, the magazine won the National Magazine Award for overall excellence in print magazine photography. Other finalists included National Geographic, New York, Vanity Fair, and The Wall Street Journal.

In 2018, California Sunday was acquired by Emerson Collective. California Sunday moved to publishing online-only in June 2020. Emerson Collective spun off Pop-Up Magazine Productions in August 2020. California Sunday suspended all publication in October 2020.

== Pop-Up Magazine ==
California Sunday, Inc. also produces a live show called Pop-Up Magazine. McGray said: “We started a media company. We approached it like a story production company. Some of the things we’d make would be live experiences, live stories, and some of the things we’d make would be stories for you to read at home.”
