= Matika Wilbur =

Native American photographer and educator

- Tsa-Tsiq
- Born: 1984 (age 41–42)
- Citizenship: Tulalip Tribes of Washington and American
- Education: Brooks Institute of Photography
- Known for: Project 562; All My Relations (podcast)
- Style: portrait photography
- Movement: Native photography
- Website: matikawilbur.com

Matika Wilbur (born 1984), is a Tulalip photographer and educator from Washington state. A citizen of the Tulalip Tribes of Washington and a Swinomish descendent, she is best known for her photography project, Project 562, and co-hosting the All My Relations podcast.

== Early life and education ==
Matika Lorraine Wilbur was born in 1984, to a Tulalip father and a Swinomish mother. She is a citizen the Tulalip and a descendant of the Swinomish Indian Tribal Community. Wilbur grew up predominantly on the Swinomish reservation in a family of commercial fishermen. She traveled to La Conner, Washington to attend high school. She graduated from the Brooks Institute of Photography with a degree in advertising.

Her Native name is Tsa-Tsiq, meaning "She Who Teaches."

== Career ==
Before beginning her photography career, Wilbur worked as a fashion photographer in Los Angeles, but found the work unfulfilling. She also worked as a teacher at Tulalip Heritage High School.

=== Photography ===
Wilbur's three initial photographic projects include We Are One People, a photograph collection of Coast Salish elders; We Emerge, a photograph collection of Native people in contemporary settings, and Save the Indian and Kill the Man, a collection of Native youth expressing their identities. Her other work includes "iHuman", presenting images interwoven with cedar bark.

"All Alone" is a 2012 project that addresses the cultural assimilation of Native Americans between the 1880–1980.

"iHuman" is a 2013 cultural project that represents the cultural dualism that Native Americans live upon.

The artist specializes in hand-tinted, black-and-white silver gelatin prints.

==== Project 562 ====
Project 562 is Wilbur's fourth major project to document contemporary Indigenous peoples, with the goal of photographing members of all US tribes on their tribal lands. Wilbur started "Project 562" as a photographic series in 2012. She began traveling across the United States in November of that year; she raised over $35,000 for her expenses in a Kickstarter campaign. She has since traveled 250,000 miles in her work to photograph indigenous people.

The title of the project refers to the number of Indigenous North American tribes officially recognized by the United States at the time Wilbur began the work. That number has since changed, reflecting the ongoing legal efforts of individual tribes to regain legal status after the decimation of tribal status under the United States Termination policy. Wilbur said her grandmother came to her in a dream suggesting she do this work. She works collaboratively with tribal leaders and members to create the photographs. Wilbur conceived of Project 562 as an answer to Edward Curtis' photographs, a century earlier, of Indigenous Americans. Curtis took over 40,000 photographs of 80 tribes.

=== Podcast ===
In 2019, Wilbur co-founded All My Relations with Adrienne Keene, who was also a co-host. Desi Small-Rodriguez was also later added as a co-host. Currently, Wilbur and Temryss Xeli'tia Lane are the main spakers on the podcast. The interview-based podcast discusses issues facing Native communities, including Indigenous food sovereignty. It has received recognition from the A.V. Club and the Toronto Star.

== Selected exhibitions ==
- 2014: Photographic Presence and Contemporary Indians: Matika Wilbur's Project 562, Tacoma Art Museum, Washington
- 2014–2016: As We See It: Contemporary Native American Photographers, Yekaterinburg Museum of Fine Arts, Ekaterinburg, Russia; The Fifth Biennial of Contemporary Photography; Novosibirsk State Art Museum, Novosibirsk, Russia; 516 ARTS, Albuquerque, NM
- 2016: Seed of Culture: The Portraits and Stories of Native American Women, Radcliffe Institute at Harvard University
- March 13 - June 13, 2021: Whatcom Museum: Seeds of Culture, Bellingham, WA
- October, 2018 - January, 2018: El Segundo Museum of Art Matriarchs Exhibition, El Segundo, CA
- November, 2018 - December, 2018: Anne Kittrell Art Gallery, Project 562, Campus Collection Series, Fayetteville, AR
