= Adrienne Keene =

American and Native American academic, writer, and activist

Dr. Adrienne J. Keene
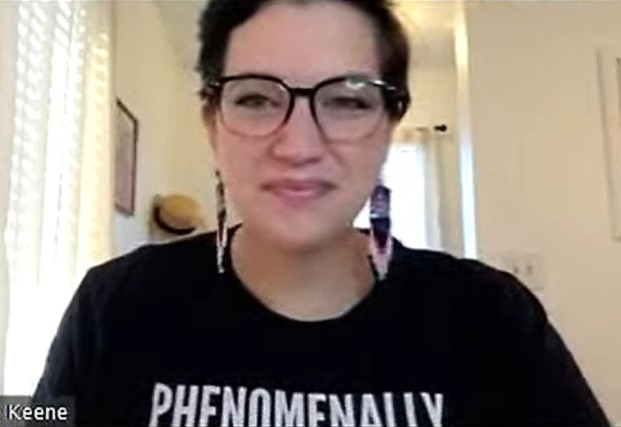
- Keene speaks to the US National Archives in 2021
- Born: 20 October 1985 (age 41)
- Occupations: Academic, activist
- Known for: Native Appropriations blog

Academic background
- Education: Stanford University; Harvard Graduate School of Education (Ed.D.)
- Thesis: "College Pride, Native Pride, and Education for Nation Building: Portraits of Native Students Navigating Freshman Year." (2014)
- Doctoral advisor: Sarah Lawrence-Lightfoot

Academic work
- Discipline: Native American Studies; American Studies
- Institutions: Brown University
- Website: nativeappropriations.com

Adrienne J. Keene (born 20 October 1985) is an American academic, writer, and activist. A citizen of the Cherokee Nation, she is the founder of Native Appropriations, a blog on contemporary Indigenous issues analyzing the way that Indigenous peoples are represented in popular culture, covering issues of cultural appropriation in fashion and music and stereotyping in film and other media. She was also an assistant professor of American Studies and Ethnic Studies at Brown University, where her research focused on educational outcomes for Native students.

== Early life and education ==
Keene is a citizen of the Cherokee Nation and grew up in San Diego, California. She earned her B.A. from Stanford University in Cultural and Social Anthropology and Native American Studies in 2007. Keene then received a master's degree in education in 2010 followed by a doctorate Ed.D. in culture, communities and education in May 2014 from the Harvard Graduate School of Education. Her dissertation was titled "College Pride, Native Pride, and Education for Nation Building: Portraits of Native Students Navigating Freshman Year."

== Activism ==
Keene's blog Native Appropriations is a webpage and forum for Native peoples, including discussions of cultural appropriation, media representations and updates on Indigenous activism. The site and Keene's writing there, as well as across other social media sites and speaking engagements, have drawn notice for commentary on topics including Native American mascots, Dakota Access Pipeline protests, college access for Native students, cultural appropriation in children's literature, tourism in Indigenous communities, fashion and racist costumes.

Supporting Native college students has also been part of Keene's work. She belongs to College Horizons, an organization that has sponsored a series of workshops that support Native students through the different stages of the college process, from admissions to navigating college life. This work formed part of her dissertation.

Starting in 2019, along with Matika Wilbur (Swinomish/Tulalip), Keene co-hosted a podcast called "All My Relations," which investigates and delves into contemporary Native identity. Keene left the podcast after three seasons.

== Academic career ==
In 2014, Keene became a Presidential Postdoctoral Fellow in Brown University's Department of Anthropology and the Center for the Study of Race and Ethnicity in America. In 2016, she was appointed assistant professor of American Studies and Ethnic Studies at Brown. She resigned from this position in 2024. She cited isolation and its impact on her health as the main reason, writing on her blog that she was "exhausted and lonely."

Her research focuses on access to higher education for Native students in America, as well as Native representation in media and culture. She continues this project with research on the use of media and emerging technology platforms by Native people to combat these images. Her academic book, College Pride, Native Pride, about the College Horizons program is forthcoming.

She was affiliated with the American Studies Association, the Native American Indigenous Studies Association, the American Educational Research Association, the Eastern Sociological Society, and the National Indian Education Association.

== Publications ==
- Notable Native People: 50 Indigenous Leaders, Dreamers, and Changemakers from Past and Present. Ten Speed Press, 2021. ISBN 978-1-9848-5794-1.
- "College Pride, Native Pride: A Portrait of a Culturally Grounded Precollege Access Program for American Indian, Alaska Native, and Native Hawaiian Students." Harvard Educational Review, 2016.
- "Representations matter: Supporting Native students in college environments". Journal Committed to Social Change on Race and Ethnicity, 2015.
