= List of American journalism awards =

List of journalism awards given in the United States

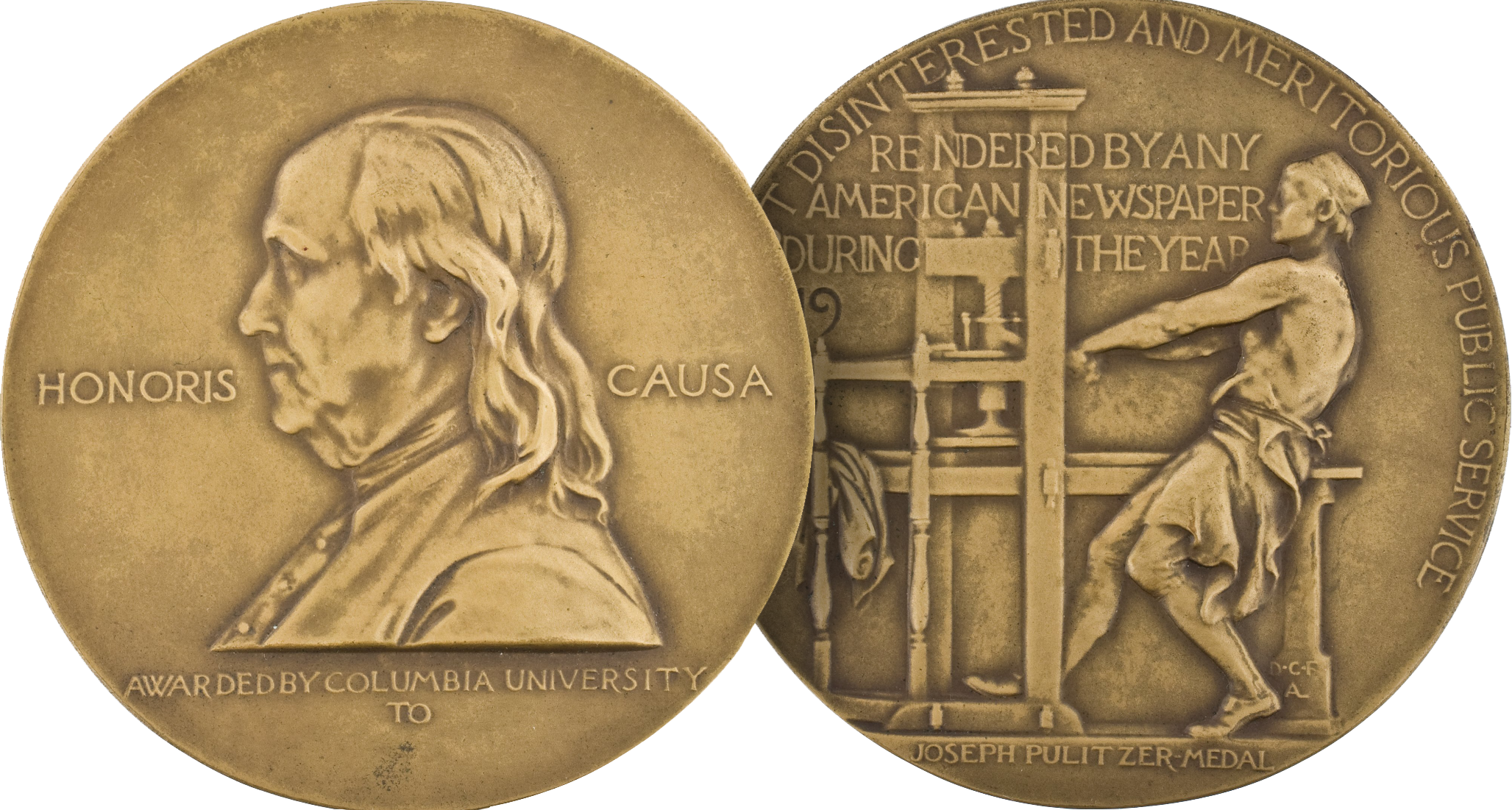
The Pulitzer Prize for Public Service recognizes a distinguished example of meritorious public service by a newspaper or news site through the use of its journalistic resources, which may include editorials, cartoons, photographs, graphics, video and other online material, and may be presented in print or online or both.

This list of American journalism awards provides an index to articles about notable awards given in the United States for journalism. Some awards are restricted to a given region or state, and most are restricted to American journalists or companies. The list includes general awards, awards for investigative and sports journalism, fellowships, and lists of categories of Pulitzer Prizes and Gerald Loeb Awards.

== General list ==
Award	Sponsor	Notes
AAJA Journalism Excellence Award(s)	Asian American Journalists Association (AAJA)	Excellence in various categories for outstanding storytelling, and in-depth reporting that moves the industry and cultural understandings forward. Pieces that demonstrate impact and are about the AAPI community, in the U.S. or abroad are highly encouraged.
Al Neuharth Award for Excellence in the Media	Freedom Forum, University of South Dakota	Award presented annually to a leading figure in the media.
Aldo Beckman Memorial Award	White House Correspondents' Association	Journalistic excellence.
Alfred I. duPont–Columbia University Award	Columbia University Graduate School of Journalism	The best in television, radio, and digital journalism
American Journalism Online Awards	New York University Arthur L. Carter Journalism Institute	Best online journalism.
American Mosaic Journalism Prize	Heising-Simons Foundation	Excellence in long-form, narrative, or deep reporting on stories about underrepresented and/or misrepresented groups in the present American landscape.
Anthony Shadid Award for Journalism Ethics	University of Wisconsin–Madison Center for Journalism Ethics	Ethical decisions in reporting stories in any medium, including print, broadcast and digital
Archbishop Edward T. O'Meara Award	Society for the Propagation of the Faith	Catholic journalism award given annually for world mission news coverage by the mission arm of the Catholic Church in the US, the pontifical Society for the Propagation of the Faith.
Barlett and Steele Awards	Donald W. Reynolds National Center for Business Journalism at Arizona State University	For excellence in investigative business journalism.
Bastiat Prize	Reason Foundation	Journalists whose published works explain, promote and defend the principles of the free society
Best in Business Awards	Society for Advancing Business Editing and Writing	Journalists submit their work in this annual competition and the awards cover business, finance and economic work across all platforms ranging from international, national and regional news outlets to specialized business publications.
Better Newspaper Contest	New York Press Association	Variety of weekly newspaper awards based on subject and newspaper circulation size. Given annually to weekly newspapers in New York State belonging to the New York Press Association
Catholic Press Awards	Catholic Media Association	Annual national excellence in journalism awards for articles in Catholic newspapers throughout the U.S. and Canada based on subject area and circulation size.
C.B. Blethen Award	Pacific Northwest Newspaper Association	Best journalist in the northwest United States
Clio Awards	Evolution Media	Creative excellence in advertising and design
Collier Prize for State Government Accountability	University of Florida College of Journalism and Communications & White House Correspondents' Association	Established by Nathan S. Collier to honor the legacy and vision of Peter Fenelon Collier, the annual award recognizes the best U.S. professional reporting on state government accountability in any medium or on any platform.
Conscience-in-Media Award	American Society of Journalists and Authors	Those who have demonstrated singular commitment to the highest principles of journalism at notable personal cost or sacrifice
Covering Climate Now Journalism Awards	Covering Climate Now	Celebrates journalism that provides a model for journalists everywhere as newsrooms increase their coverage of the climate crisis.
CPJ International Press Freedom Awards	Committee to Protect Journalists	Journalists or their publications around the world who show courage in defending press freedom despite facing attacks, threats, or imprisonment
Edgar A. Poe Award	White House Correspondents' Association	Excellence in news coverage of subjects and events of significant national or regional importance to the American people
Edward R. Murrow Award (Radio Television Digital News Association)	Radio Television Digital News Association	News stories that uphold the RTDNA Code of Ethics, demonstrate technical expertise and exemplify the importance and impact of journalism as a service to the community
Elijah Parish Lovejoy Award	Colby College	A member of the newspaper profession who has contributed to the country's journalistic achievement
Elliott V. Bell Award	New York Financial Writers' Association	An award named in honor of the NYFWA's founding president to an outstanding journalist for a significant long-term contribution to the profession of financial journalism
Eric Breindel Award for Excellence in Opinion Journalism	Eric Breindel Memorial Foundation	Columnist, editorialist or reporter who best reflects the spirit of Mr. Breindel's writings: Love of Country and its democratic institutions as well as the act of bearing witness to the evils of totalitarianism
Front Page Award	Newswomen's Club of New York	Journalistic achievement by women
George Polk Awards	Long Island University	To honor excellence in print and broadcast journalism
Good News Awards	Churches in the Upper Peninsula of Michigan	Published media that affirm the dignity of people, recognize and uphold universally-recognized human values, and uplift and nourish the human spirit
Gerald R. Ford Journalism Prizes	The Gerald R. Ford Presidential Foundation	Journalism Prize honors outstanding reporting on national defense and the presidency.
Green Eyeshade Awards	Society of Professional Journalists	Best journalism in the southeastern United States
Gregory Kolovakos Award	PEN America	U.S. literary translator, editor, or critic "whose work, in meeting the challenge of cultural difference, extends Gregory Kolovakos's commitment to the richness of Hispanic literature and to expanding its English-language audience (not given since 2004)
Henry R. Luce Award	Time Inc.	Editorial excellence in print, digital and multimedia categories
Herblock Prize	The Herblock Foundation	Editorial cartooning
The Hillman Prize	The Sidney Hillman Foundation	Journalists, writers and public figures who pursue social justice and public policy for the common good
Impact Award	New York Financial Writers' Association	The award honors stories that have a demonstrable impact on the world, whether by spurring investigations, changing laws or holding the powerful to account
Horace Greeley Award	New England Press Association	Excellence in the print media of New England
International Editor of the Year Award	World Press Review	Editor or editors outside the United States whose work best exemplifies the principles of journalism
Jesse H. Neal Awards	Software & Information Industry Association (SIIA)	Established in 1955 by American Business Media (now part of SIIA) to recognize editorial excellence in business-to-business journalism.
John Chancellor Award	Columbia University	Excellence in Journalism
John Murphy Award for Excellence in Copy Editing	Texas Daily Newspaper Association (TDNA)	Excellence in Copy Editing in TDNA papers
Keystone Press Awards	Pennsylvania NewsMedia Association	Relevance, integrity and initiative in serving readers, and furthers First Amendment values
Livingston Award	University of Michigan	Local, national, and international reporting for journalists under the age of 35
Lowell Thomas Travel Journalism Awards	SATW Foundation	Excellence in Travel journalism
Maria Moors Cabot Prizes	Columbia University	Journalists in the Western hemisphere who for significant contributions to upholding freedom of the press in the Americas and Inter-American understanding
Michael A. Dornheim Award	National Press Club	Presented in honor of the late Michael A. Dornheim, a longtime reporter and editor at Aviation Week & Space Technology magazine. The recipient must be a working journalist writing about aerospace, defense, the airline industry, or aerospace science and engineering.
Minard Editor Award	UCLA Anderson School of Management	Business editors whose work does not receive a byline or whose face does not appear on the air for the work covered
Missouri Lifestyle Journalism Awards	University of Missouri	Women's pages that covered topics other than society, club, and fashion news, and that also covered such topics as lifestyle and consumer affairs
MOLLY National Journalism Prize	The Texas Observer	Superior journalism in the tradition of Molly Ivins
National Association of Hispanic Journalists Hall of Fame	National Association of Hispanic Journalists	Great achievement
National Journalism Awards	Scripps Howard Foundation	Best work in journalism in 17 categories
National Magazine Awards	American Society of Magazine Editors	Print and digital publications that consistently demonstrate superior execution of editorial objectives, innovative techniques, noteworthy enterprise and imaginative design
National Pacemaker Awards	National Scholastic Press Association, Associated Collegiate Press	Excellence in American student journalism
News & Documentary Emmy Award	National Academy of Television Arts and Sciences	Outstanding achievement in national news and documentary programming
Online Journalism Awards	Online News Association	Established 2000, honoring excellence and innovation in digital journalism from around the world
Payne Award for Ethics in Journalism	University of Oregon	To honor the journalist of integrity and character who reports with insight and clarity in the face of political or economic pressures and to reward performance that inspires public trust in the media
Peabody Award	Henry W. Grady College of Journalism and Mass Communication	Distinguished achievement and meritorious public service by television and radio stations, networks, producing organizations, individuals, and the World Wide Web.
PEN/Nora Magid Award for Magazine Editing	PEN America	Magazine editor whose high literary standards and taste have, throughout his or her career, contributed significantly to the excellence of the publication he or she edits
Peter F. Collier Award for Ethics in Journalism	Ethics & Journalism Initiative, New York University Arthur L. Carter Journalism Institute	Student, local, and professional journalists whose journalism meets the highest ethical standards in the face of pressure or incentives to do otherwise.
Philip Meyer Journalism Award	National Institute for Computer-Assisted Reporting, Walter Cronkite School of Journalism and Mass Communication	Best journalism done using social science research methods
Pulitzer Prize	Columbia University	Excellence in newspaper journalism (see below for categories)
Robert Capa Gold Medal	Overseas Press Club	Best published photographic reporting from abroad requiring exceptional courage and enterprise
Robert F. Kennedy Journalism Award	Robert F. Kennedy Human Rights	Reporting on issues that reflect Robert F. Kennedy's concerns, including human rights, social justice and the power of individual action in the United States and around the world
Robert Novak Journalism Award	The Fund for American Studies	Reporting on issues leading to a full-length non-fiction work focused on the reporter's area of expertise. Honoring the legacy of Robert Novak
Robinson Prize	ACES: The Society for Editing	Copy editor whose work demonstrates exceptional effectiveness
Sarah Booth Conroy Prize	American Institute of Architects	Reportorial or critical excellence in fostering a better public understanding of architecture and urbanism in Washington, DC.
Science in Society Journalism Awards	National Association of Science Writers	Outstanding investigative and interpretive reporting about the sciences and their impact for good and ill
Sidney Kobre Award for Lifetime Achievement in Journalism History	American Journalism Historians Association	Individuals with an exemplary record of sustained achievement in journalism history through teaching, research, professional activities, or other contributions to the field of journalism history
Sigma Delta Chi Award	Society of Professional Journalists	Excellence in journalism
Simon Rockower Award	American Jewish Press Association	Excellence in Jewish Journalism
Sunday Magazine Editors Association Awards	Sunday Magazine Editors Association	Various categories: from 1987 to 2001
Sunshine State Awards	Society of Professional Journalists	Best journalism in Florida, Puerto Rico, and the U.S. Virgin Islands
Toner Prize for Excellence in Political Reporting	S. I. Newhouse School of Public Communications	Reporting that illuminates the electoral process or reveals the politics of policy and engages the public in democracy.
Wallis Annenberg Justice for Women Journalists Award	International Women's Media Foundation	Women journalists who are detained, jailed or imprisoned
Walter Cronkite Award for Excellence in Journalism	Walter Cronkite School of Journalism and Mass Communication	Leading figure in the journalism industry, especially for ground-breaking achievements which have advanced the industry as a whole
Yankee Quill Award	Academy of New England Journalists	Lifetime contribution toward excellence in journalism in New England

== Investigative journalism ==
Investigative journalists research in depth a topic such as a serious crime or incident of political corruption or corporate wrongdoing. They may spend months or years researching and preparing a report.

Award	Sponsor	Honors	Since
Goldsmith Prize for Investigative Reporting	Shorenstein Center on Media, Politics and Public Policy	Exposing examples of poor government, and encouraging good government in the United States	1991
Investigative Reporters and Editors	Missouri School of Journalism	Quality of investigative reporting	1975
James Aronson Award	Hunter College	Original, written English-language reporting from the U.S. media that brings to light widespread injustices, their human consequences, underlying causes, and possible reforms	1990
Malcolm Law Investigative Reporting Award	Tennessee Associated Press	Investigative reporting	1973
Pulitzer Prize for Investigative Reporting	Columbia University Graduate School of Journalism	Distinguished example of investigative reporting by an individual or team, presented as a single article or series in print journalism	1953
Selden Ring Award	USC Annenberg School for Communication and Journalism	Investigative reporting that has had an impact and caused change	1990
Sidney Award	The Sidney Hillman Foundation	Outstanding investigative journalism in service of the common good	2009
Worth Bingham Prize	Worth Bingham Memorial Fund	Investigative reporting of stories of national significance where the public interest is being ill-served	1967

== Sports journalism ==
Sports journalism covers matters pertaining to sporting topics and competitions.

Award	Sponsor	Notes
American Sportscasters Association Hall of Fame	American Sportscasters Association	Excellence in the field of sports broadcasting
Billie Awards	Women's Sports Foundation	Positive portrayals of female athletes in visual media
Curt Gowdy Media Award	Naismith Memorial Basketball Hall of Fame	Outstanding basketball writers and broadcasters
Dick McCann Memorial Award	Professional Football Writers of America	Long and distinguished reporting on professional football
Dick Schaap Award for Outstanding Journalism	Nassau County Sports Commission	Journalist who best exemplifies the principles and talents of sportswriter Dick Schaap
J. G. Taylor Spink Award	Baseball Writers' Association of America	Excellence reporting
National Sports Media Association Hall of Fame	National Sports Media Association	Each spring, the NSMA Hall of Fame inducts one or more new members
National Sportscaster of the Year	National Sports Media Association	Sportscaster
National Sportswriter of the Year	National Sports Media Association	Sportswriter
Red Smith Award	Associated Press Sports Editors	Outstanding contributions to sports journalism
Tom Borrelli Award	National Lacrosse League	Media Person of the Year
USBWA Hall of Fame	United States Basketball Writers Association	

== Other specific topics ==
Topic	Award	Sponsor	Notes
Agriculture	Borlaug CAST Communication Award	Council for Agricultural Science and Technology	Promoting agriculture through research, teaching, extension, or mass communication...
Business	Morton Margolin Prize for Distinguished Business Reporting	Daniels College of Business	Business journalism published in a Colorado newspaper or magazine
Business	Gerald Loeb Award	UCLA Anderson School of Management	Excellence in business journalism
Chemistry	James T. Grady-James H. Stack Award for Interpreting Chemistry	American Chemical Society	Outstanding reporting on chemistry, chemical engineering, and related chemical fields
Education	Fred M. Hechinger Grand Prize for Distinguished Education Reporting	Education Writers Association	Top work of journalism among first-place winners in the National Awards for Education Reporting
Environment	Grantham Prize	Metcalf Institute for Marine and Environmental Reporting	Exemplary reporting on the environment (2005–2012)
Garment Industry	Atrium Award	Henry W. Grady College of Journalism and Mass Communication and AmericasMart	Excellence in journalism coverage of the garment industry
International	Cornelius Ryan Award	Overseas Press Club	Best nonfiction book on international affairs
International	Shorenstein Prize	Asia–Pacific Research Center	Distinguished writing and reporting that helps Americans to better understand the complexities of Asia
LGBT community	GLAAD Media Award	GLAAD	Outstanding representations of the lesbian, gay, bisexual and transgender (LGBT) community and the issues that affect their lives
Media Industry	Mirror Awards	S. I. Newhouse School of Public Communications	Excellence in media industry reporting
Theater	Critics and Awards Program for High School Students	Critics and Awards Program	Reviews by high school theater and journalism students

== Fellowships ==
Award	Sponsor	Notes
John S. Knight Journalism Fellowships at Stanford	Stanford University	Journalistic innovation, entrepreneurship and leadership
Knight Science Journalism Fellowships	MIT School of Humanities, Arts, and Social Sciences	Coverage of science and technology, medicine, or the environment
Knight-Wallace Fellowship	University of Michigan	Reporters, editors, photographers, producers, editorial writers and cartoonists
Nieman Fellowship	Harvard University	Innovation, investigative journalism etc.
Education Writers Association Reporting Fellowships	Education Writers Association	Education journalism

== Pulitzer Prizes for journalism ==
- Pulitzer Prize for Beat Reporting
- Pulitzer Prize for Breaking News Photography
- Pulitzer Prize for Breaking News Reporting
- Pulitzer Prize for Commentary
- Pulitzer Prize for Correspondence
- Pulitzer Prize for Criticism
- Pulitzer Prize for Editorial Cartooning
- Pulitzer Prize for Editorial Writing
- Pulitzer Prize for Explanatory Reporting
- Pulitzer Prize for Feature Writing
- Pulitzer Prize for International Reporting
- Pulitzer Prize for Investigative Reporting
- Pulitzer Prize for Local Reporting
- Pulitzer Prize for National Reporting
- Pulitzer Prize for Photography
- Pulitzer Prize for Public Service
- Pulitzer Prize for Reporting
- Pulitzer Prize Special Citations and Awards

== Gerald Loeb Award winners ==
- Gerald Loeb Award winners for Audio and Video
- Gerald Loeb Award winners for Breaking News
- Gerald Loeb Award winners for Broadcast
- List of Gerald Loeb Business Book Award winners
- Gerald Loeb Award winners for Columns, Commentary, and Editorials
- Gerald Loeb Award winners for Deadline and Beat Reporting
- Gerald Loeb Award winners for Explanatory
- Gerald Loeb Award winners for Feature
- Gerald Loeb Award winners for Images, Graphics, Interactives, and Visuals
- Gerald Loeb Award winners for International
- Gerald Loeb Award winners for Investigative
- Gerald Loeb Award winners for Large Newspapers
- Gerald Loeb Award winners for Local
- Gerald Loeb Award winners for Magazines
- List of winners of the Gerald Loeb Newspaper Award
- Gerald Loeb Award winners for News Service, Online, and Blogging
- Gerald Loeb Award winners for Personal Finance and Personal Service
- Gerald Loeb Award winners for Radio
- List of winners of the Gerald Loeb Award for Small and Medium Newspapers
- Gerald Loeb Award winners for Spot News
- Gerald Loeb Award winners for Television
- Gerald Loeb Lifetime Achievement Award winners
- Gerald Loeb Memorial Award winners
- Gerald Loeb Special Award winners

== See also ==
- Lists of awards
- List of journalism awards
