= Sandra Eisert =

American photojournalist and editor (born 1952)

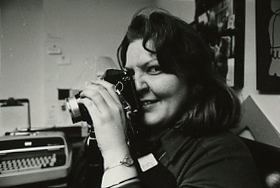
- Eisert in the White House, 1976
- Born: Sandra Eisert; January 1, 1952 (age 74)
- Education: Indiana University Bloomington (B.A.)
- Occupation: Photo editor
- Years active: 1973–present
- Employer: Videre
- Awards: NPPA Picture Editor of the Year
- Website: sandraeisert.com

Sandra Eisert (born January 1, 1952) is an American photojournalist, now an art director and picture editor. In 1974 she became the first White House picture editor. Later she was named Picture Editor of the Year by the National Press Photographers Association in its annual competition. She contributed to 1989 earthquake coverage that won a Pulitzer Prize for the San Jose Mercury News. As of 2012, she has her own business providing strategic planning for startups.

== Early life ==
In 1969, Eisert attended Indiana University Bloomington, a public research university in Bloomington, Indiana. Four years later she received the Bachelor of Arts, Journalism (B.A.J.).

== Career ==
After graduating, Eisert began working the photo desk at The Louisville Times, which was the afternoon paper of the Louisville Courier-Journal and Times. A year later, U.S. President Gerald Ford appointed Eisert to the position of White House picture editor, making her the first in that position at the White House. At that time, Eisert's transition was part of the first efforts towards gender parity in photojournalism that began in the 1960s and 1970s. Through her insider position at White House, Eisert advanced the area of photojournalism coverage of U.S. presidents. Writing about Eisert's contributions in his 2002 book, Get the Picture: A Personal History of Photojournalism, picture editor John G. Morris noted:

She and Kennerly [photographer David Hume Kennerly] broke new ground in candid presidential coverage, even releasing pictures of the president's jovial celebration with Henry Kissinger in the Oval Office when "only" fifteen U.S. marines (plus twenty-six others) died in the 1975 rescue of forty seamen aboard the merchant ship Mayaguez after its seizure by Cambodian Communists in the Gulf of Siam.

While at the Ford White House in 1975, Eisert served on the faculty of the Missouri Photo Workshop, an annual week-long photojournalism school based in Lee Hills Hall at the Missouri School of Journalism. Susan Ford (daughter of President Ford) attended the 1975 workshop. From 1975 to 2000, Eisert would go on to serve eighteen different years on the Missouri Photo Workshop faculty. In 1983, she described the Missouri Photo Workshop as being about "thinking": "thinking about photographs and how you do them is certainly relevant and in very short supply".

=== Life after the White House ===
After working in the Ford administration White House, Eisert worked as an Associated Press Washington Bureau picture editor, picture editor for The Washington Post and picture editor for the Louisville Courier-Journal and Times. Eisert was hired by the San Jose Mercury News as design director and was promoted to senior graphics editor before becoming art director for its Sunday magazine (West Magazine).

In 1986, Eisert worked with a seventeen-member team of photography editors to edit Day in the Life of America, a photo project by American photographer Rick Smolan. The 1986 Smolan project worked towards coordinating more than 200 photographers from 33 nations as part of one of the first attempts to catch the spirit of the United States in a single day on film. Eisert and her team were tasked with "winnowing down" more than a quarter-million photo frames taken in the 24-hours of Friday, May 2, 1986 into 300 prints to be published in the book, A Day in the Life of America Photographed by 200 of the world's leading photojournalists on one day.

In 1988, Eisert designed the cover photo for the Monsters of Rock Tour 1988. That same year, Eisert received the Atrium Award for Graphic Design while working at the San Jose Mercury News. At the San Jose Mercury News Eisert helped cover the 1989 Loma Prieta earthquake. The staff won the Pulitzer Prize for General News Reporting next year, citing "detailed coverage of the October 17, 1989, Bay Area earthquake and its aftermath."

=== 1990s on ===
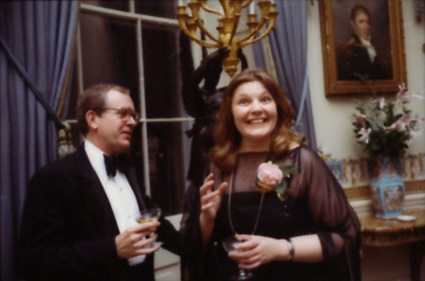
White House photo editor Sandra Eisert in formal wear with her guest, Richard Clarkson, in the White House Blue Room following a December 6, 1976 State Dinner for Giulio Andreotti, Prime Minister of Italy

In 1990, Eisert was one of three judges who selected entries in a national exhibition of Women in Photojournalism that was taken on a national tour by the National Press Photographers Association (NPPA), a professional society of still and video photojournalists. In 1991, Eisert received the 1990 Picture Editor of the Year award for Newspapers/Sports Picture Editing in the Pictures of the Year competition. This award recognized Eisert's work, Field of Dreamers, for the San Jose Mercury News. A year later, Eisert was part of the six-person team at The Mercury News that was awarded third place in the 1991 Picture Editing/Team Portfolio category of the University of Missouri's Pictures of the Year. She took second place in the 1992 Pictures of the Year's Magazine Feature Story Picture Editing category for her contribution to a story in West Magazine.

After her string of Pictures of the Year awards, the National Press Photographers Association awarded Eisert the Joseph Costa Award at the NPPAs annual convention in June 1993. At the time, Eisert worked as West Magazine's Art Director and was the first woman to win the award since it was first given out in 1954. That same month, Eisert designed the cover for the June 27, 1993 issue of West Magazine, which subsequently received an award from the Sunday Magazine Editors Association as being one of the ten best Sunday magazine covers in the United States.

In early February 1994, Eisert left her position at the San Jose Mercury News to become the director of photography at the San Francisco Examiner newspaper. On her hiring, San Francisco Examiner executive editor Phil Bronstein noted,

Sandra has a reputation nationwide as a visual artist of tremendous vision and ability. Her presence here will assure that photography, a key element of our craft, will remain one of The Examiner's great strengths.

Eisert was part of a team of twelve Mercury News photo editors that received the 1993 Pictures of the Year competition's Overall Excellence in Editing award. The team's Overall Excellence in Editing award was determined from more than 25,000 pages and photographs from more than 1,500 editors and photographers based on each team or individual's submitted overall body of work.

In March 1994, Eisert received the Bronze award for photojournalism from the Society for News Design in the 15th annual Best of Newspaper Design competition based on her work on West Magazine. That same year, Eisert photo-edited Material World: A Global Family Portrait, a photo essay by American freelance photojournalist Peter Menzel. Two years later, Eisert photo-edited Women in the Material World, a 1996 companion volume to Material World that focuses on women from 20 different countries, along with short essays. Eisert and National Geographic Magazine photographer Chris Johns conducted a 1996 conference on nature and documentary photography at the National Museum of Wildlife Art.

In 1998, Eisert worked as senior graphics editor for Microsoft, where she designed the first MSNBC.com website. By that time, she had significant years as a photo editor. In reply to a 1998 written request from the University of Oregon visual communication and photojournalism professor Julianne H. Newton to give her thoughts on the role of a photo editor, Eisert replied:

Photographers meet more real people than anyone at the newspaper, but they don't decide what runs. Photographers' agenda are set by what wins POY [Photographer of the year] awards. Picture editors' agenda are set by what they think news editors will publish. The news editor's agenda are set by what we learned in journalism school about news values—what's news is what's new and unexpected—and by what they think the public is interested in. We've got to have some happy news out there—not just death, destruction, mayhem.

In giving advice to mentee photojournalist Anna Marie Remedios at a 2005 Women in Photojournalism conference about family and career, Eisert noted: "Don't give up your life for your career. It's not worth it. You will be alone like I am". As of 2012, Eisert provides strategic planning for startups through Videre, her own company based in Redmond, Washington.

== Selected publications ==
- Peter Menzel, Charles C. Mann (1994), Material World: A Global Family Portrait, University of California Press, pp. 255, ISBN 0871564300 (Photo editing by Sandra Eisert)
- Faith D'Aluisio, Peter Menzel (1996), Women in the Material World, Sierra Club Books, p. 256, ISBN 0871563983 (Picture editing by Sandra Eisert)
- Jennifer Loomis, Hugo Kugiya (2009), Portraits of Pregnancy: The Birth of a Mother, Sentient Publications, p. 159, ISBN 978-1591810827 (Book designed by Sandra Eisert)
- Kim Komenich (2012), Revolution Revisited—The Philippine Power People Revolution 1986–2011, University of California Press (Book Editor: Sandra Eisert)

== Awards/Recognitions ==
- 1988: Atrium Award for Graphic Design while working at the San Jose Mercury News, University of Georgia School of Journalism and Mass Communication and AmericasMart.
- 1990: Member of San Jose Mercury News staff that the Pulitzer Prize for General News Reporting
- 1990: Picture Editor of the Year award, National Press Photographers Association and the University of Missouri.
- 1993: Joseph Costa Award, National Press Photographers Association. Eisert was the first woman honored with this award.
- 1993: Designer of one of the ten best Sunday magazine covers in the United States, Sunday Magazine Editors Association.
- 1993: Member of a team of twelve Mercury News photo editors that received the 1993 Pictures of the Year competition's Overall Excellence in Editing award, National Press Photographers Association.
