= San Jose Mercury News West Magazine =

US magazine

- Editor: Jeffrey Bruce Klein (1982–1992)
- Categories: News magazine
- First issue: 1982
- Final issue: c. 1997
- Company: San Jose Mercury News
- Country: United States
- Based in: California
- Language: English

San Jose Mercury News West Magazine, also referred to as West and West Magazine, was a Sunday magazine published by San Jose Mercury News from 1982 to c. 1997. West Magazine received numerous awards and was recognized both for its articles and investigative journalism, as well as its art design.

The San Jose Mercury News West Magazine was not related to the Los Angeles Times-operated West Magazine, which was published between 1967 and 1972, although its name paid homage to the earlier publication.

== History ==
In the 1970s, the San Jose Mercury News published a Sunday magazine insert titled California Today.

Jeffrey Bruce Klein began working at San Jose Mercury News in 1979, and in 1986 was promoted to associate editor and columnist. Susan Faludi worked as a reporter for West Magazine in 1987; she went on to receive a Pulitzer Prize in 1991. By 1993, Klein was editor-in-chief of West, and in January of that year he left to become editor-in-chief of Mother Jones.

He was replaced by Pat Dillon, a Mercury News columnist with a college degree from the University of Washington and a M.A. from Boston University, whose prior experience included work with the Associated Press and San Diego Union.

In 1994, Dillon left West to work on a book. The next editor-in-chief was Fran Smith, former medical reporter and magazine writer for West. Smith, who had previously worked at Mercury News for 10 years, received a B.S. from Cornell University and a graduated from University of California, Berkeley with a master's degree in journalism. In the acknowledgements in his book The Valley of Heart's Delight, author Michael Shawn Malone comments: "At the Mercury-News' West Magazine, first Jeffrey Klein and then Patrick Dillon, let me push the limits of feature writing." In 1994, Bob Ingle served as executive editor of Mercury News. Jerome Ceppos also served as an editor at the magazine.

== Awards and recognition ==
Reporter John Hubner was honored with the first-place award in writing in the 1985 California-Nevada UPI Editors Association Newspaper Awards competition, for his series of articles on Arthur Rudolph, a former Nazi rocket scientist. Hubner received the second-place award from the National Education Writers Association, for his November 2, 1986 article "How George Shirley Almost Beat the System," about teacher George Shirley who had been fired in the Spring of 1986 from Salinas Union High School District in Salinas, California. The Unity Awards in Media Committee of the Lincoln University of Missouri awarded Hubner a first-place award for the same article. Hubner's work was recognized with the UAIM trophy "for news coverage of minority problems and concerns in education", at a formal ceremony in Jefferson City, Missouri. Susan Faludi received a merit award in 1987 in the California Newspaper Publishers Association's annual competition, for her contributions to West. In October 1987, the magazine received multiple awards at the Society of Newspaper Design conference in Austin, Texas. Sidney Fischer was recognized for artwork published in the magazine, Bambi Nicklen for her work as art director, and Ken Coffelt received an award for free-lance writing. Edward O. Welles received a Gerald Loeb Award in 1987 for his work on the article "Technical Equities".

In 1988 the California Newspaper Publishers Association's annual Better Newspapers competition recognized reporter Susan Faludi for her writing on Japanese American internment. In 1989, Carole Rafferty received a first-place award at the annual Peninsula Press Club awards dinner, for her article "Sympathy for the Devil". The magazine took multiple awards in the 1989 "Best of the West" journalism contest, out of a pool of submissions from reporters in 13 states from the Western United States. Journalist Michael Zielenziger received a first-place award for reporting on environmental policies of the Reagan administration. A group of reporters from the magazine received a first-place award for reporting on effects of Proposition 13. John Hubner received a third-place award in the contest, for his article on how Salinas, California tire factory employees were affected by benzene. In 1990, Gary Blonston received a first-place award for his article "Pandora's Kitchen," at the Peninsula Press Club banquet awards.

In 1991, the Sunday Magazine Editors Association awarded Hubner first prize for an article series he wrote in the category of "investigative or in-depth reporting", and named a West magazine cover illustration by Sue Coe as one of the 10 best covers of the year. Hubner's article series was judged for Sunday Magazine Editors Association by Harrison E. Salisbury, former foreign correspondent for The New York Times. Salisbury characterized Hubner's series of articles as "incredible in its detail and the manner in which it has all been put together. I don't think I have seen anything like it in the press or in the electronic media in recent years." The Associated Press News Executives Council of California and Nevada honored Kathy Holub with a first-place prize in features in its annual newswriting and photography contest, for her story of her own rape experience, "A Case of Rape". Staff writer Mike Weiss received a certificate of merit award from in the 1992 J.C. Penney-University of Missouri Newspaper Awards, for his article "The Shield That Failed," about a female police officer who filed sexual harassment charges against her superior. In 1993, West art director Sandra Eisert became the first woman to be honored with the Joseph Costa Award from the National Press Photographers Association, the second-highest award given by the organization. At the 1994 annual conference of Sunday newspaper magazines, SunMag, West was recognized for its June 27, 1993 magazine cover. SunMag placed the June 1993 magazine cover among the 10 best Sunday magazine covers. The cover picture was taken by photographer Jason M. Grow, and the cover was designed by former West art director Sandra Eisert.

== See also ==
- San Francisco Chronicle Magazine
- Robert Cohn
- Sunday Magazine Editors Association
