= Brian M. Rosenthal =

American journalist

- Born: March 16, 1989 (age 37)
- Education: Medill School of Journalism at Northwestern University
- Occupation: Journalist

Brian Martin Rosenthal is an American journalist. He is an investigative reporter at The New York Times and a former president of the Investigative Reporters and Editors (IRE), the largest network of investigative journalists in the world.

== Career ==
He graduated from the Northwestern University, where he was editor in chief of The Daily Northwestern.

After interning at several local newspapers, he started his professional career in 2011 as a staff reporter at The Seattle Times, covering education and local government. While in Seattle, he was part of a reporting team that won the 2015 Pulitzer Prize in Breaking News for coverage of a mudslide that killed 43 people.

Rosenthal joined the The Houston Chronicle in 2014 as a reporter based in the Austin bureau, focused on government, politics, and health and human services. At the Chronicle, he wrote a 7-part series, "Denied" that revealed that Texas had secretly and systematically denied special education to children with disabilities. The reporting forced the state to change its special education system, leading to services for hundreds of thousands of children with disabilities. The series was a finalist for the 2017 Pulitzer Prize in Public Service.

In 2017, The New York Times announced Rosenthal's hire as part of an effort in "further expanding its already robust investigative team."

While working as an investigative reporter on the Metro Desk, covering New York, Rosenthal won the 2020 Pulitzer Prize in Investigative Reporting for exposing how leaders of the New York City taxi industry profited from predatory loans that shattered the lives of vulnerable cabdrivers.

In 2023, Rosenthal joined the Investigations Desk at The Times, which focuses on national investigations. He has since written extensively about the United States organ transplant system, among other topics.

A 2020 profile in The Times said Rosenthal's signature investigations are known for citing "enormous sums of interviews" including "nearly 100 current and former M.T.A. employees," or "more than 100 other psychiatrists, nurses and officials" or "more than 300 experts, educators and parents."

In addition to his recognition from the Pulitzer Prizes, Rosenthal has won the George Polk Award three times and the Selden Ring Award for Investigative Reporting. He won a national Emmy Award in 2019 for his work as a producer on a mini-documentary. He has also been a finalist for the Anthony Shadid Award for Journalism Ethics.

He was elected in 2019 as an member of the board of directors of Investigative Reporters and Editors (IRE). He served as president from 2023 to 2025 and board chairman in 2026.

== Life ==
Rosenthal grew up in Indiana. He is married to Millie Tran, who is the chief digital content officer at the Council on Foreign Relations. They live in New Jersey with their son.
