= Nada Bakri =

Lebanese American journalist

Nada Bakri is a Lebanese American journalist who covered the Middle East for over a decade, covering events including the 2006 July War and the Arab Spring. She was also a contributor to the 2019 anthology Our Women on the Ground: Essays by Arab Women Reporting from the Middle East

== Life ==
Bakri holds a Master of Science degree from the Graduate School of Journalism at Columbia University. She has reported on the Middle East for various publications for more than a decade, including The Washington Post, The New York Times, and The Daily Star, while based in Beirut and Baghdad. Bakri currently resides in Boston, Massachusetts.

She was married to journalist Anthony Shadid, who died in Syria in 2012; following his death, she donated his papers to the American University of Beirut.

== Works ==
- 'Love and Loss in a Time of Revolution', in Hankir, Zahra, ed. (2019). Our Women on the Ground: Essays by Arab Women Reporting from the Arab World. Penguin.
