= Mark Bell =

Mark Bell may refer to:

== Athletes ==
- Mark Bell (defensive end) (born 1957), National Football League player (Seattle Seahawks)
- Mark Bell (wide receiver) (born 1957), National Football League player (St. Louis Cardinals)
- Mark Bell (cyclist) (1960–2009), British Olympic cyclist
- Mark Bell (footballer) (1881–1961), Scottish footballer
- Mark Bell (ice hockey) (born 1980), Canadian ice hockey player
- Mark Bell (rugby league) (born 1967), Australian rugby league footballer
- Mark Bell (rugby union) (born 1968), Australian rugby union footballer

== Musicians ==
- Mark Bell (British musician) (1971–2014), British musician and producer
- Mark Bell (New Zealand musician) (fl. 2000s), New Zealand musician and songwriter

== Other people ==
- Mark Bell (journalist) (born 1985), American journalist
- Mark Sever Bell (1843–1906), English recipient of the Victoria Cross

== See also ==
- Marc Bell (disambiguation)
- Marcus Bell (disambiguation)
