= San Francisco Chronicle Magazine =

Sunday magazine of the San Francisco Chronicle

- Editor: David Lewis
- Art director: Matt Petty
- Photo editor: Russell Yip
- Staff writer: Sam Whiting
- Categories: Sunday magazine
- Frequency: Monthly
- Circulation: 292,459
- Publisher: Hearst Publications
- First issue: November 26, 2000; 25 years ago
- Company: San Francisco Chronicle
- Country: United States
- Based in: San Francisco
- Language: English
- Website: www.sfgate.com/living/
- ISSN: 1932-8672
- OCLC: 1105224461

The San Francisco Chronicle Magazine is a Sunday magazine published on the first Sunday of every month as an insert in the San Francisco Chronicle. The current magazine is the successor of The San Francisco Examiner Magazine, Image Magazine, and California Living Magazine. The staff of the Chronicle and the Examiner were combined in 2000, following a sale of The San Francisco Examiner, for anti-trust reasons, to the Fangs.

== History ==
Prior to the creation of the magazine, the first issue of which appeared on Sunday, November 26, 2000, readers of the San Francisco Chronicle and The San Francisco Examiner were served by The San Francisco Examiner Magazine, included in the Sunday edition of the papers which were produced jointly under the joint operating agreement signed by the two papers. The San Francisco Examiner Magazine was preceded by Image Magazine, which was itself preceded by the glossy paper rotogravure pictorial magazine, California Living Magazine.

The San Francisco Chronicle, as the Daily Morning Chronicle, was the first newspaper in the country to introduce a Sunday magazine when it did so in 1869 with the aim of providing a "literary dimension" to the newspaper. That magazine, co-edited (1919-1941) by Leonard Sutton Wood, printed by an outside printer, however, ended sometime prior to the Chronicle's absorption of the Examiner staff and the creation of the current San Francisco Chronicle Magazine.

== California Living magazine ==
Frank Herbert, moved to California in 1949, and was a writer and editor for the San Francisco Examiner's California Living magazine for a decade. He left journalism in 1972.

Gerald Adams was a feature writer for California Living magazine published by the San Francisco Examiner. Adams wrote a special issue called The Neighborhoods of San Francisco. Walter Blum was a writer for California Living magazine published by the San Francisco Examiner.

== California Living Books ==
California Living Books was an imprint of The San Francisco Examiner.

== Examiner Magazine ==
The San Francisco Examiner Magazine, also known as Examiner Magazine, had won various awards in the years preceding its absorption by the Chronicle. In 2000, "India: Land of Marx and Maharjahs," by free-lance writer Adam Hochschild was given the Sigma Delta Chi Award for excellence in magazine reporting by the Society of Professional Journalists and a bronze medal from the Society of American Travel Writers' Lowell Thomas Awards for magazine writing on foreign travel. Also in 2000, the magazine was given several awards by the Sunday Magazine Editors Association: Second place in the essay category for "Boy's Life," by Theodore Roszak; third place in the overall design for Examiner Magazine art directors Josephine Rigg and Zahid Sardar; second place in the single spread design category for "Tale of the Tapes," about the Kennedy/Nixon tapes, went to Examiner artist Andrew Skwish; third place in the illustration category for "Boy's Life," Colin Johnson's illustration of Roszack's piece. At the time of these awards, Executive Editor of the Examiner Phil Bronstein said, "The San Francisco Examiner Magazine has become one of the top Sunday newspaper magazines in the country, offering our readers well-written and provocative articles accompanied by attractive, witty and sophisticated graphics." In 1999, the Examiner's magazine won several awards as part of the annual Gold Ink Awards: the magazine's fall "Destinations" issues won the Silver Award; the magazine's two spring and fall Home Design issues and a spring "Destinations" issue, edited by John Flinn, each won Pewter awards. The Gold Ink Awards are given for quality of printing. In 1998, the Examiner's magazine won four SunMag awards from the Sunday Magazine Editors Association: first place in Best Use of Illustration to Art Director Josephine Rigg and freelance illustrator Adam McCauley for a Bay to Breakers Race Day Map; third place in Overall Design to Rigg and Associate Art Director Zahid Sardar; Honorable Mention to Examiner Science Writer Keay Davidson for "Weird Science," about the 50th anniversary of the first "UFO sighting"'; Honorable Mention to writer Neal Gabler for a cover story about Walter Winchell and Herb Caen. Alluding the fact that many newspapers were cutting back or eliminating their Sunday magazines, Bronstein said at the time of the 1998 awards, "The Examiner bucked the national trend when we decided to revitalize our Sunday Magazine to provide more for our readers. We're honored to... [be] recognized by our peers from across the nation."

=== Image Magazine ===
Image Magazine, also known as Image: The Magazine of Northern California, was the second incarnation of the Examiner's Sunday magazine, following California Living Magazine. Image was edited for some time by David Talbot before he went on to found Salon.com.

Critic Greil Marcus said of Image that it was "the most consistently high-quality, surprising, challenging arts and politics magazine the Bay Area has had in my memory."

== Chronicle Magazine ==
This August 19, 2007, edition of the San Francisco Chronicle Magazine shows the 2007 redesign.

When the Hearst Corporation, owner of the Examiner, bought the Chronicle in 2000, it sold the Examiner and offered positions at the Chronicle to all Examiner staff members. The Examiner Magazine was discontinued by the new owners of the newspaper, and the staff migrated the Chronicle, creating the new San Francisco Chronicle Magazine. In a letter to readers of the new magazine, the editors wrote, "Now that the... staffs have merged, we plan to deliver an even better Sunday Magazine, larger in scope and full of new material, as part of the ongoing changes that will make the Chronicle a truly great regional newspaper," the editors' note continued, "We welcome you to the new San Francisco Chronicle Magazine, and promise to do our level best to deliver literate, exciting and visually attractive journalism."

In 2001 the magazine underwent a redesign as part of a general overhaul of the Sunday edition of the Chronicle with the professed goal, "to put [readers] in touch with where [they] live, and... to celebrate and highlight the rich tapestry of diversity that makes us unique." The redesigned magazine sported a "cleaned-up design" and five new departments. Bay Wrap, "a compendium of people, places and things," was put at the front of each edition, and Food, Fashion, Design and Neighborhoods, were put at the back of each edition.

In 2002, weekly production halted and the magazine became biweekly. Chronicle Editor Phil Bronstein told Editor & Publisher magazine that the newspaper was hemorrhaging money on the magazine but readers were furious about the halting of weekly publication. "We were getting completely hammered [financially]. But then we decided we ought to either kill it, or bring it back every week."

In 2003, the magazine underwent another redesign. In addition to returning to weekly publication, restaurant critic Michael Bauer's weekly reviews moved to the magazine from Sunday Datebook and Merl Reagle's popular crossword puzzle returned to the magazine after being moved to the Datebook when the magazine became biweekly. A weekly San Francisco/Bay Area focused literary essay was introduced inside the back cover and featured essays by the likes of Garrison Keillor. The fashion and design departments of the magazine were visually overhauled for a "brand-new look." The magazine's paper stock was upgraded to a heavier grade for improved display of photography. According to published letters in the Chronicle, the 2003 redesign was quite popular among readers, with many specifically hailing the return of Reagle's crossword puzzle.

Shortly after the 2003 redesign, in February of that year, the magazine featured stories from Zoetrope, the "all story magazine" created by Francis Ford Coppola, the San Francisco film director.

The magazine underwent a third redesign in 2007. This redesign brought several new features to the magazine: Tripping, a travel column; Perspectives, an expert advice column; Healthy Obsessions, featuring local athletes; Take Two, a design column by Design Editor Zahid Sardar; Bright Ideas by Sam Whiting, exploring new ideas in the Bay Area; On the Couch, about how couples met, which later moved to the Style section of the Chronicle, before eventually being discontinued. Additionally, Michael Bauer's restaurant reviews were integrated with SFGate, the Chronicle's website, where 360-degree views of the restaurants were featured.

=== Move to monthly publication ===
On July 6, 2008, the Chronicle announced that the issue of the magazine in that newspaper would be the last weekly issue and that, starting August 3, the magazine would be published the first Sunday of each month. Each issue of the new magazine would focus on a single subject such as home design, travel, food or weddings. Many weekly magazine features migrated to other sections of the newspaper. Merle Reagle's crossword puzzle moved the Datebook, On the Couch and Michael Bauer's restaurant reviews moved to Style, and Zahid Sardar's Take Two moved to Home & Garden.

In contrast to the 2003 redesign, readers widely panned the magazine's move to monthly publication in published letters to the Chronicle.
