= Hwaida Saad =

Hwaida Saad is a Lebanese journalist who writes for the New York Times. Based in Beirut, she has written on Lebanon, ISIS and the experience across the Middle East of everyday life sustained through conflict. Saad was a contributor to Zahra Hankir's 2019 anthology Our Women on the Ground.

== Life ==
Hwaida Saad is the daughter of a cafeteria worker. Her first degree, gained from the Lebanese University in 1993, was in public relations. She took various teaching, PR, and administrative roles, managing the Lebanese office of a Syrian auto supply for several years.

After Rafiq al-Hariri's 2005 assassination, Saad helped a friend by acting as a fixer for the Boston Globe. She discovered she enjoyed the work, and after gaining a master's degree in education from Saint Joseph University of Beirut in 2008 started working for the New York Times as an interpreter and news assistant.

When the Syrian Civil War started in 2011, Saad was an early adopter of Skype, and through online chatting built up an extensive network of contacts across the Syrian political spectrum.

== Writing ==
- — (2019). "What Normal?". In Hankir, Zahra (ed.). Our Women on the Ground: Essays by Arab Women Reporting from the Arab World. Penguin. pp. 28–44.
