= Zeina Karam =

Zeina Karam is a Lebanese journalist with Associated Press (AP). Since 2022 she has been AP's deputy news director for Europe.

== Life ==
Karam gained a degree in political science and public administration from the American University of Beirut. She started covering the Middle East for AP in 1996. In 2011 she was one of the first foreign reporters to enter Syria as the Arab Spring erupted.

In 2014 she became AP Beirut bureau chief, overseeing text coverage of Lebanon and Syria. In 2016 she became news director for Lebanon, Syria and Iraq.

Karam was a contributor to the 2019 anthology Our Women on the Ground: Essays by Arab Women Reporting from the Middle East. Her contribution, reflecting on the experiences of those who saw Syria descend into civil war, asked the question "Did we do them all justice in our reporting?".

== Works ==
- 'Syria Undone', in Hankir, Zahra, ed. (2019). Our Women on the Ground: Essays by Arab Women Reporting from the Arab World. Penguin. pp. 221-.
