= House of Stone =

2012 book on personal history in Southern Lebanon

House of Stone: A Memoir of Home, Family, and a Lost Middle East
- First edition
- Author: Anthony Shadid
- Language: English
- Genre: Non-fiction
- Published: 2012
- Publisher: Houghton Mifflin Harcourt
- Publication place: United States
- Media type: Print
- Pages: 283
- Preceded by: Night Draws Near

House of Stone: A Memoir of Home, Family, and a Lost Middle East is a 2012 book by Anthony Shadid, a former New York Times journalist.

== Story ==
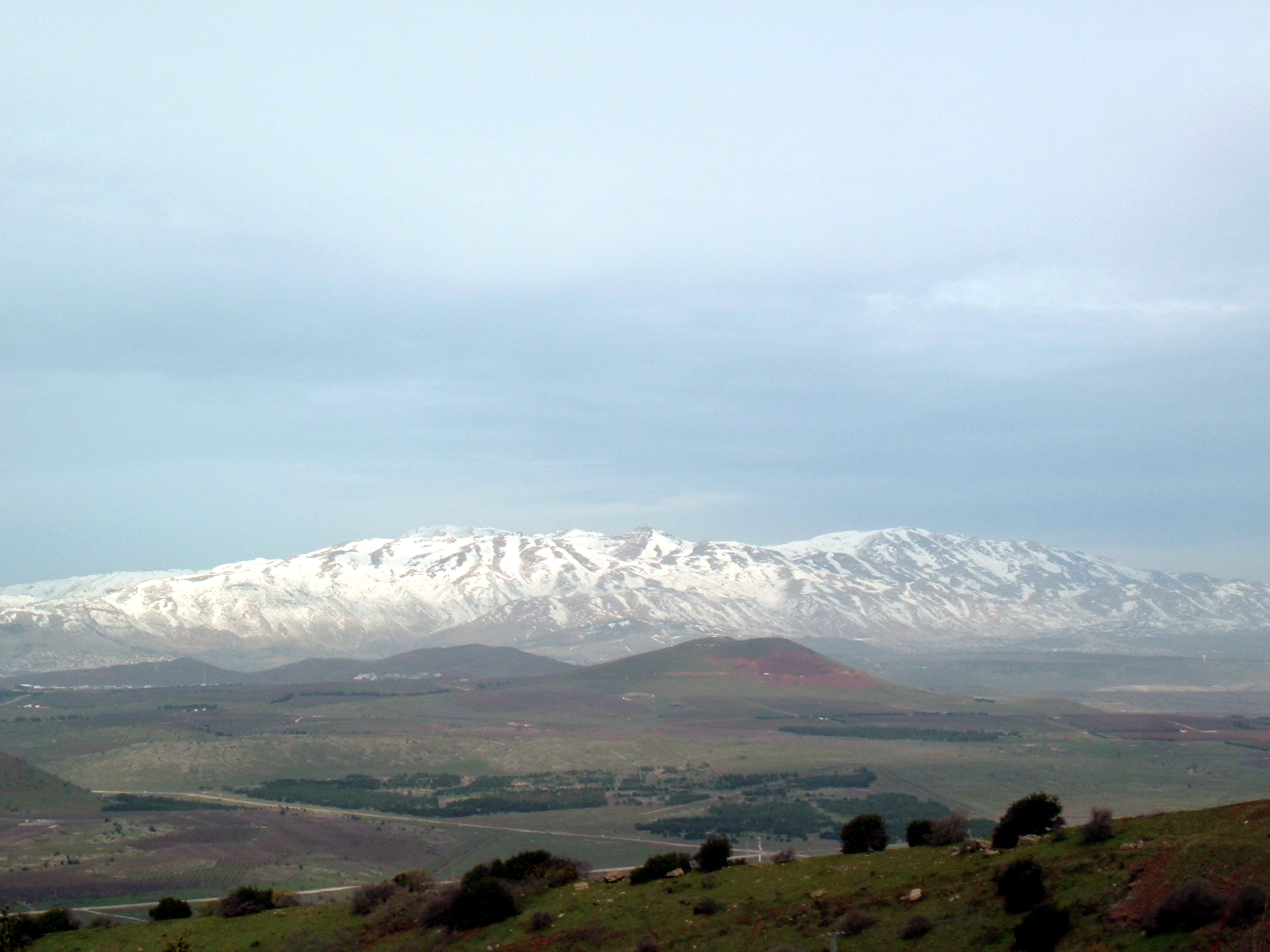
Shadid writes about Mount Hermon (viewed from Mount Bental in the Golan Heights)

House of Stone details Shadid's return to and rebuilding of his family's home in Marjayoun (Arabic: مرجعيون: Lebanese pronunciation[ˈmaɾʒ.ʕajuːn]), also known as 'Jdeideh / Jdeida / Jdeidet Marjeyoun, in the administrative district of Marjeyoun District, in the Nabatieh Governorate in Southern Lebanon.

It recounts the story of his family, particularly his great-grandfathers Isber Samara and Ayyash Shadid of the Bani Ghassan, originally from Yemen via Jordan and the Hauran ("Houran" in the book). It was this house that Shadid was rebuilding. He interweaves history and physical descriptions of the region, including nearby Mount Hermon and the Litani River.

== Publication ==
The book was published in 2012, shortly after Shadid died while covering the Syrian civil war).

== Awards and honors ==
- 2012 National Book Award (Nonfiction), finalist.
- 2012 National Book Critics Circle Award (Autobiography), finalist.

== See also ==
- Anthony Shadid
- Marjayoun
