= Marc Bell =

Marc Bell is the name of:

- Marc Bell (cartoonist) (born 1971), Canadian cartoonist
- Marc Bell (drummer) (born 1952), American drummer for The Ramones and The Voidoids
- Marc Bell (entrepreneur), American managing partner of Marc Bell Capital

== See also ==
- Marcus Bell
- Mark Bell
