= Mabel Craft Deering =

American journalist

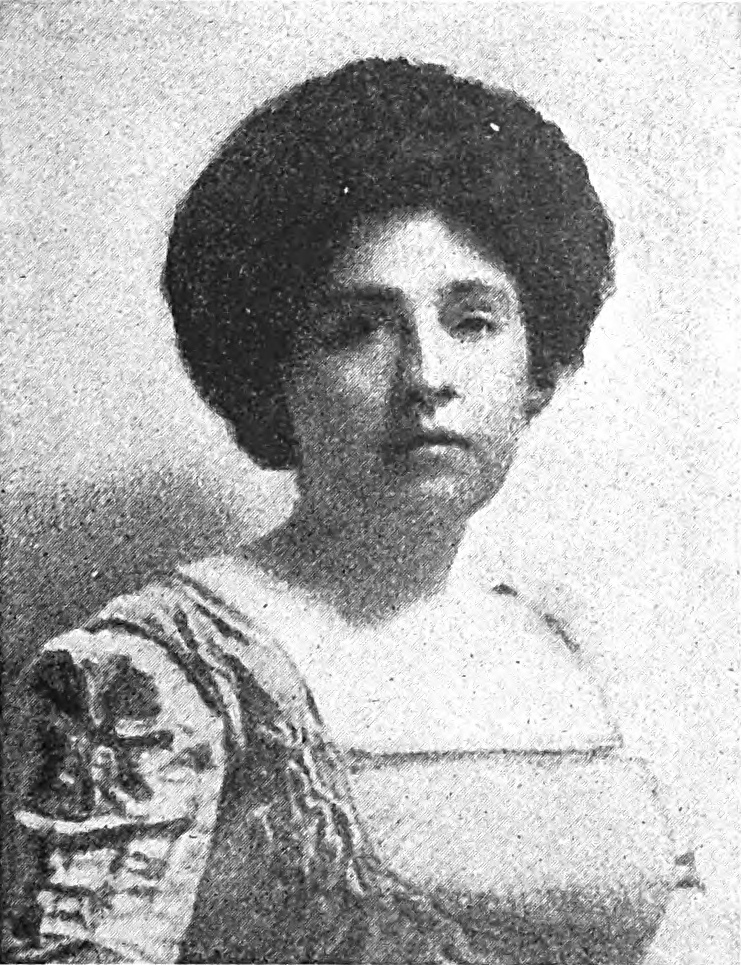
Mabel Craft Deering

Mabel Clare Deering (née Craft; November 5, 1873 – July 8, 1953) was a San Francisco Bay Area socialite, journalist and supporter of progressive causes such as women's suffrage and the admission of black women to a national women's organization. As a University of California student, she protested the awarding of a medal for scholarship that was given to a man instead of to her.

She was the first woman to edit a national Sunday magazine.

== Early life and education ==
Craft was born on November 5, 1873, in Rochelle, Illinois, to Ellen Eugenia Coolbaugh and Richard Corson Craft. Her father became "a wealthy grocer in East Oakland," California.

Mabel Craft attended Oakland public schools. While at Oakland High School, she participated in the Aegis Publishing Company, where she was elected to "take charge of the ladies' department." She was also president of the Girls' Debating Society and vice-president of the Irex Boating Club. She graduated as valedictorian in June 1888.

Craft graduated from the University of California, Berkeley, on June 29, 1892, when she gave an address on "The Economic Position of Women."

That year she was denied a gold medal, the prestigious prize in a yearly competition for the highest grade among graduating students on the Berkeley campus. Instead, the award was offered to Joseph Baldwin Garber, who refused it because, he said, "it made invidious distinctions."

The two had almost identical records over four years. In a statement, she said that her average over four years was 93.588, while Garber's was 93.581. She stated that:

The next move . . . was the announcement that the first section received by Mr. Garber for the senior year in military science would be extended back over the entire college course. . . . I inquired of all the members of the classes of '90 and '91 that I could find if this had ever been done before, and one and all, officers and privates, assured me that they had received no mark for any military work except that done in the senior year.

Craft made an unsuccessful appeal to the Board of Regents. She said she had been informed that the university's acting president, Martin Kellogg, told the board that the award "was not given on account of the military, but because the young man was a more distinguished scholar."

Interviewed later, Kellogg said:

The faculty feel that they are not to be bound by the exact marking of the student . . . just that they should act according to the total impression made during the course. . . Miss Craft has I think the feeling that the faculty is prejudiced against her because she is a woman and that they prefer to give the highest honors to a man irrespective of her standing. I feel sure, however, there is no such feeling.

She would have been the first woman to win the gold medal.

Craft entered Hastings College of Law in August 1892. She was elected vice president of the sixty-member junior class in November of that year. She graduated from Hastings with a law degree.

== Career ==
Craft worked ten years as a writer or editor on the San Francisco Chronicle, three of them as editor of the Sunday supplement magazine, the first woman in the country to hold such a position.

Her free-lance articles or stories appeared in Atlantic Monthly, St. Nicholas Magazine, Everybody's, Munsey's, Leslie's Weekly, Sunset, New Idea Woman's Magazine, Japan, National Magazine, and Good Housekeeping.

In 1898, she accompanied a delegation of Congress members on an inspection trip to Hawaii, which had just been taken over by the United States. She wrote a book about the islands, Hawaii Nei, after which one reviewer called her "an ardent royalist" who criticized the Republic of Hawaii for "inconsistencies which will probably stir the gorge of the leaders in Hawaii but which is rather amusing to Americans." She recalled decades later that the book was banned from the Honolulu library because, according to a local newspaper, "in it she panned the missionaries."

Town Talks, a San Francisco publication, said of her in 1899:

There are many who have classed Miss Craft as first of local descriptive writers. . . . The quality of her work is such as to end all discussion as to who is the best all around newspaper writer in San Francisco.

In 1902, The Anaconda Standard of Montana said that Craft had "made a hit when put in charge of the story about the return of the California volunteers from the Philippines, with eight reporters and three artists working under her instructions."

== Activities ==
=== Women's clubs ===
In 1901 Craft was active in a campaign to allow organizations of Negro women to join the National Federation of Women's Clubs. The San Francisco Examiner reported that Craft, in a "spirited debate" before the Forum [women's] Club, "stood forth as the champion of the social equality of colored women."

In another debate, within the Philomath Club women's group, she stated:

Our motto is service, and if we cannot find it in our hearts to do what we can to help the colored women – why, we had better break up our Federation! We will profit more by admitting the negro into our Federation than they [would], for we would be doing a very fine, honest, just thing, and if women's clubs are to be broad, if you are not to be narrow, exclusive women, you cannot but see the justice of my argument.

The next year, Craft appeared before another women's group, the California Club, and, according to the San Francisco Examiner,

there was a very warm time in the club because Miss Mabel Craft, one of the members with a hobby in favor of the admission of colored women's clubs to the General Federation of Women's Clubs, did a little politics. As a result of her work[,] the club, before it knew what had happened, had voted in favor of the admission of colored women, and then the trouble began.

The Examiner said that Mrs. Lovell White, California Club president, announced her intention not to accept the nomination for president of the State Federation of Women's Clubs but that "the color-line question has nothing to do with my determination not to accept the nomination."

Craft was put forward in 1902 as a candidate for presidency of the National Federation (then called the General Federation), she said without her knowledge. She rejected the idea in a letter she wrote to Mrs. Robert J. Burdette, who was one of three declared candidates for the office.

=== Suffrage ===
In 1896, Craft was treasurer of the Fifth Ward Political Equality Club, a group of women suffragists. In April of that year she sought signatures at the Oakland Hall of Records on an initiative petition favoring granting California women the right to vote.

Along with her husband, Frank P. Deering (see below), by 1903 she had been made a life member of the National American Women Suffrage Association.

In 1910 Craft was added to the list of contributing editors for the women's rights publication Woman's Journal, "to take the place made vacant by the death of Mrs. Julia Ward Howe."

In 1911 she was a director of the College Women's Franchise League and chairman of the California state press committee, and in 1913, The Citizen of Ottawa, Canada, reported that "much of the credit of winning equal suffrage in California" (in 1911) belonged to her. "It is doubtful if suffrage would have secured any material vote in California without this educative work."

== Marriage and family ==
Craft was married on November 22, 1902, to Frank P. Deering in East Oakland. A society article noted that "The bride will be unattended. A number of the groom's friends from the Bohemian Club will act as ushers." She was accompanied to the altar by her father. There were 170 guests.

An Oakland Tribune writer said:

No one ever thought that Mabel Craft would have a wedding like the weddings of everyone else, and she didn't disappoint us. Instead of the wedding veil, which isn't becoming to every style, she wore a very stunning hat on her pretty brown hair, a flat, Shepherdess shaped affair of white tulle, covered with white applique lace, and with one white ostrich feather under the brim.

Between 1906 and 1939, the couple lived at 2704–2790 Larkin Street, Russian Hill, San Francisco. They had a daughter, Francesca.

Frank Prentiss Deering died on May 19, 1939. Four years later, his widow moved to a new house and, as one of her social entertainments, she invited a dozen "of the most attractive and eligible bachelors in San Francisco" to be in the receiving line. They all accepted.

== Death ==
Mabel Craft Deering died at the age of 80 on July 8, 1953, in her home at 2709 Larkin Street, San Francisco.
