= Anthony Shadid =

American journalist (1968–2012)

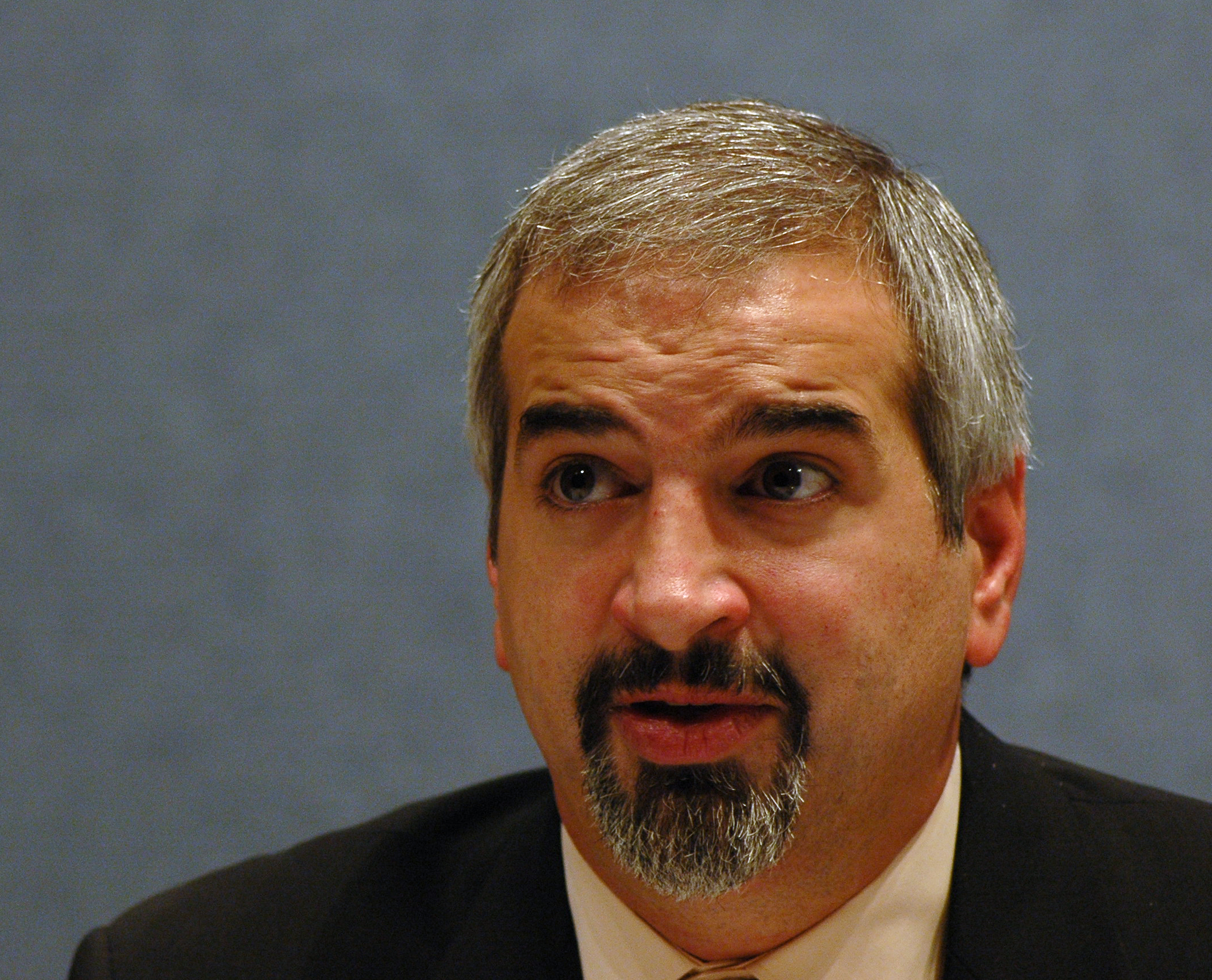
- Shadid at the National Press Club in 2007
- Born: Anthony Shadid; September 26, 1968; Oklahoma City, Oklahoma, U.S.
- Died: February 16, 2012 (aged 43); Syria
- Education: University of Wisconsin–Madison (1990)
- Occupation: Journalist
- Employer: The New York Times
- Known for: Pulitzer Prize winner
- Spouse: Nada Bakri (m. 2009–2012)
- Children: 2
- Awards: Pulitzer Prize for International Reporting, in 2004 and 2010

Anthony Shadid (September 26, 1968 – February 16, 2012) was a foreign correspondent for The New York Times based in Baghdad and Beirut who won the Pulitzer Prize for International Reporting twice, in 2004 and 2010.

== Background ==
Anthony Shadid was born on September 26, 1968, in Oklahoma City, Oklahoma, of Lebanese Christian descent. In 1990, he graduated from the University of Wisconsin–Madison, where he wrote for The Daily Cardinal student newspaper.

== Career ==
From 2003 to 2009 Shadid was a staff writer for The Washington Post where he was an Islamic affairs correspondent based in the Middle East. He previously worked as Middle East correspondent for the Associated Press based in Cairo and as news editor of the AP bureau in Los Angeles. He spent two years covering diplomacy and the State Department for The Boston Globe before joining the Post's foreign desk.

In 2002, he was shot in the shoulder by an Israel sniper in Ramallah while reporting for the Boston Globe in the West Bank. The bullet also grazed his spine.

On March 16, 2011, Shadid and three colleagues were reported missing in Eastern Libya, having gone there to report on the uprising against the dictatorship of Col. Muammar Al-Ghaddafi. On March 18, 2011, The New York Times reported that Libya agreed to free him and three colleagues: Stephen Farrell, Lynsey Addario and Tyler Hicks. The Libyan government released the four journalists on March 21, 2011.

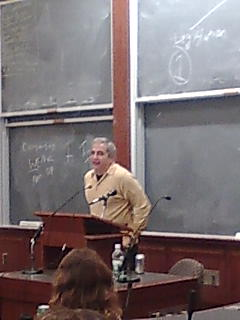
Journalist Anthony Shadid in a talk at Harvard Law School

== Personal life and death ==
Shadid married Nada Bakri, also a reporter for The New York Times; they had a son, Malik. Shadid had a daughter, Laila, from his first marriage.

Michael Shadid was his great uncle.

Shadid died at age 43 on February 16, 2012, from a "fatal asthma attack" while attempting to leave Syria. Shadid's smoking and extreme allergy to horses are believed to be the major contributing factors in causing his fatal asthma attack. "He was walking behind some horses," said his father. "He's more allergic to those than anything else—and he had an asthma attack." His body was carried to Turkey by Tyler Hicks, a photographer for The New York Times.

Shadid's cousin, Dr. Edward Shadid of Oklahoma City, challenged the Times' version of the death, and instead blamed the publication for forcing him into Syria.

== Awards ==
- 2003: George Polk Award for Foreign Reporting
- 2004:
  - Michael Kelly Award
  - Overseas Press Club award
  - American Society of Newspaper Editors award
  - Pulitzer Prize for International Reporting (2004)
- 2006: Ridenhour Book Prize for Night Draws Near
- 2010: Pulitzer Prize for International Reporting (2010)
- 2011: Honorary Doctorate of Humane Letters from the American University of Beirut
- 2012:
  - George Polk Award for Foreign Reporting
  - Finalist for National Book Award (Nonfiction) and National Book Critics Circle Award (Autobiography) for House of Stone

== Works ==
Shadid's experiences in Iraq formed the subject for his 2005 book Night Draws Near, an empathetic look at how the war has impacted the Iraqi people beyond liberation and insurgency.

- Legacy of the Prophet: Despots, Democrats, and the New Politics of Islam (Westview Press, 2002)
- Night Draws Near: Iraq's People in the Shadow of America's War (New York: Henry Holt and Company, 2005)
  - Dove la notte non finisce (Piemme, 2006)
- House of Stone: A Memoir of Home, Family, and a Lost Middle East (New York: Houghton Mifflin Harcourt, 2012)
- Award for Journalism Ethics
