= Marcus Bell =

Marcus Bell may refer to:

- Marcus Bell (lineman) (born 1979), former lineman in American football
- Marcus Bell (linebacker) (born 1977), former linebacker in American football
- Marcus Bell (musician), American music producer, composer, and musician
- Detective Marcus Bell, a character in the television series Elementary

== See also ==
- Marc Bell
- Mark Bell
