= Mark Bell (journalist) =

American journalist

Mark Eric Bell (born 1985) is an American journalist who reported primarily on public safety and criminal court issues as a full-time staff reporter at The Daily News Journal in Murfreesboro between April 2008 and June 2013. His articles have also appeared in The Tennessean in Nashville and the internationally-distributed newspaper, USA Today. Bell has also appeared on national television.

== Biography ==
Bell was born to Lester Mark and Lisa Bell on Oct. 22, 1985 at Morristown-Hamblen Hospital in Morristown, Tennessee. He grew up in Talbott, Tennessee and attended Morristown-Hamblen High School West in Morristown, where he graduated in 2004. He earned a degree in journalism at Middle Tennessee State University in Murfreesboro, Tennessee.

== Awards ==
=== Malcolm Law Investigative Reporting Award ===
Bell is a three-time winner of the prestigious Malcolm Law Investigative Reporting Award from the Tennessee Associated Press.

==== 'Hard Time (Understanding)' ====
Bell won the Malcolm Law award in 2013 for an investigative story about inconsistencies in the way jails and work center facilities in Tennessee apply Tennessee 'Good Time,' work and other sentencing credits for inmates.

The story highlighted differences between two facilities in Rutherford County, Tennessee. One inmate had been released from a facility to participate in a rehabilitation program, but was asked to return after authorities discovered she still had time to serve on her sentence, as calculated by that facility. Bell discovered the Rutherford County Correctional Work Center had been using a formula to calculate the length of inmates' sentences which was different from the 2-for-1 'Good Time' credit that is prescribed by Tennessee law.

==== 'Inmates work in scrutiny' ====
Bell won the Malcolm Law award in 2012 for a series of stories dealing with Rutherford County, Tennessee inmates working on a private horse farm without a valid contract, which was in violation of state law governing such labor on private property.

Bell uncovered that inmates from the jail were cleaning up storm debris and repairing fences at the private farm, where the Rutherford County Sheriff's Office mounted patrol division boarded and trained its horses. The lease agreement allowing the sheriff's office to use the stables and property had been expired for more than a year when Bell broke the story in May 2011.

The following day, inmate work there was suspended. It resumed several months later when the county drew up a new lease agreement with the stables owner, which allowed the sheriff's office mounted patrol and inmates to access and work on the property for $200 per month. Also uncovered in the series of stories was that a now-former sheriff had signed a contract with the stables owner without going to the Rutherford County Board of Commissioners for approval.

==== Fatal accident investigation ====
Bell first won the Malcolm Law award in 2009 for a series of investigative articles stemming from a July 17, 2008 fatal crash, which involved an 11-year-old Hopkinsville, Kentucky girl and a now-former sheriff's detective. The crash occurred on Bradyville Pike in Murfreesboro, Tennessee.

Bell reported eyewitness accounts that the detective dumped bottles containing alcohol from his cruiser after the crash and that investigators initially ignored those accounts and failed to collect the bottles at the scene. The chief of the Murfreesboro Police Department later admitted that investigators erred in not collecting the bottles, at least one of which was later linked to the sheriff's detective by the Tennessee Bureau of Investigation.

Two members of the Murfreesboro Fatal Accident Crash Team, including its commander, were forced to resign from the team and were placed on suspension by Murfreesboro Police Department's police chief and the city manager.

The sheriff's detective was eventually charged criminally with one count of reckless homicide and tampering with evidence. Eventually acquitted of reckless homicide and with the tampering with evidence charge dismissed in a separate proceeding, the detective was allowed to return to work. However, he was fired by a newly elected sheriff within a month of his return. The new sheriff had stated in his campaign that the detective had destroyed his reputation with the department.

=== First Amendment citation ===
Bell was part of a team that won a First Amendment Citation during the National Associated Press awards held in New York on Aug. 3, 2009.

=== Tennessee Press Association Award ===
Bell and The Daily News Journal were also awarded first place for investigative reporting by The Tennessee Press Association at their 2009 awards ceremony.

== Brief television appearances ==
Bell was among a number of reporters who covered the March 2011 stabbing death of Middle Tennessee State University basketball star Tina Stewart by her college roommate, Shanterrica Madden. Madden, an MTSU student, was convicted in May 2012 of second-degree murder in the off-campus killing. Several of Bell's articles on the case appeared in the Gannett-owned USA Today. The case was later featured on the Oxygen Network's true crime television series, Snapped. Bell appears in the episode discussing facts of the case.

Bell also appeared on the 20th season of Oxygen Network's Snapped in reference to his coverage of the murder of General Jack Rains. Tina Williamson was convicted of the murder in February 2009.

More recently, Bell appeared on a 2024 episode of Oxygen Network's Killer Relationship with Faith Jenkins regarding the killing of 83-year-old former Tennessee State Trooper General Jack Rains, for whom Tina Gail Williamson was found guilty of first-degree murder in February 2009.
