= Jeffrey Bruce Klein =

American journalist (1948–2025)

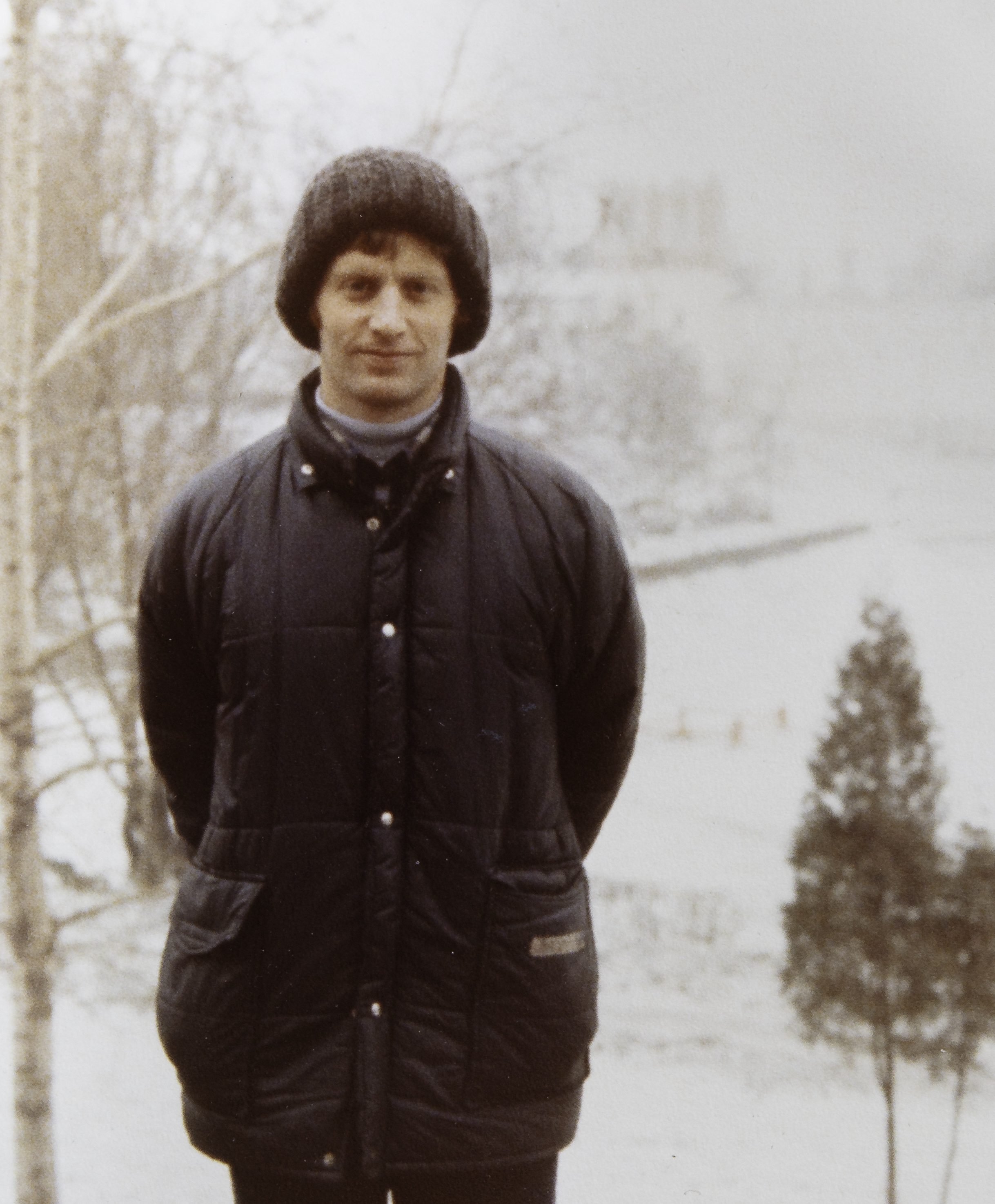
- Klein on assignment for Mother Jones in Moscow, 1978
- Born: January 15, 1948; Scranton, Pennsylvania, U.S.
- Died: March 13, 2025 (aged 77); Menlo Park, California, U.S.
- Education: Columbia University
- Known for: Co-founder and editor-in-chief of Mother Jones
- Spouses: Judith Weinstein (m. 1971; died 1996); Judi Cohen (divorced); Claudia Brooks (m. 2020)
- Children: 2

Jeffrey Bruce Klein (January 15, 1948 – March 13, 2025) was an American investigative journalist who co-founded Mother Jones in 1976.

For its first issue he found a piece that won a National Magazine Award. He forced the resignation of Ronald Reagan's chief foreign policy advisor, Richard V. Allen, at the 1980 Republican National Convention. At the San Jose Mercury News in 1983–92, he investigated The Pentagon’s secret programs to dominate space. Susan Faludi began Backlash: The Undeclared War Against American Women while working for Klein there. Returning in the 1990s to be Mother Jones’ editor-in-chief, Klein directed exposés of Newt Gingrich, Bob Dole, the top 400 political contributors in the U.S. and Donald Sipple, the Republicans' star image-maker. The investigative series on Speaker Gingrich led to his unprecedented public reprimand by the United States House of Representatives and a $300,000 fine. Klein made Mother Jones the first general-interest magazine to place its content on the Internet. In 2005, he co-produced for The NewsHour with Jim Lehrer a series on China's rising economy that won a Gerald Loeb Award.

== Background ==
Klein was born on January 15, 1948, in the Hill Section of Scranton, Pennsylvania, to Dr. Harold and Helen Klein. When Klein was 12, his father died of a heart attack on the golf course; his mother's multiple sclerosis flared and she became bedridden. Klein attended Scranton Central High School and Columbia University. During his senior year at Columbia, he studied “the moral life in the process of revising itself” under Lionel Trilling, who was preparing to give the Norton lectures at Harvard University the following year. Klein's first published article, “A Cuban Journal”, appeared in the Winter 1970 Columbia Forum; it critiqued his experiences cutting sugar cane with the Venceremos Brigade in Cuba.

== Career ==
=== Co-founding Mother Jones ===
Klein was one of the journalists who founded Mother Jones magazine in 1976, in the wake of the Vietnamese War and Watergate. For its first issue, Klein found a memoir about growing up in Beijing by Li-li Ch'en that won a National Magazine Award. In 1977, Klein became the magazine's second managing editor; Adam Hochschild had been the first. When Larry Flynt expressed an interest in distributing Mother Jones, Klein used the opportunity to do a “Born Again Porn” profile of Flynt and Hustler’s demographics, which were disclosed to be much broader than the presumed blue collar audience. He reported from Moscow about Jewish refuseniks barred from leaving the Soviet Union. His article “Esalen Slides Off The Cliff” shook up that human potential retreat perched on the California coast by showing its co-founder being duped by a psychic. His story predicting what might happen during the first four years of a Reagan Administration contained a co-written sidebar exposing that Reagan's chief foreign policy adviser, Richard V. Allen, had been on the payroll of Robert Vesco (then the world's largest swindler and a fugitive) at the same time that Allen was working in Nixon's White House. Allen was forced to resign from the campaign, but was appointed National Security Advisor after Reagan's landslide victory. Allen resigned a second time when other personal scandals came to light.

=== At the San Jose Mercury News ===
After a stint as the editor-in-chief of San Francisco magazine, Klein founded West, the Sunday magazine of the San Jose Mercury News, in 1982. The magazine sought to penetrate Silicon Valley. A satiric look at Valley's top powerbrokers provoked ire from the newspaper's publisher, Tony Ridder, and also led to the founding of the cheeky magazine Upside. Susan Faludi began her book Backlash as a series of articles for West. While editing at the Mercury-News, Klein also reported on the Pentagon's efforts, through its black budget, to dominate space. With Dan Stober, he co-wrote "The American Empire In Space: 'Star Wars' -- The Strategic Defense Initiative -- Has Become The Space Domination Initiative". He also wrote a thriller called The Black Hole Affair based on his reporting; the novel was first serialized in the Mercury-News.

=== Returning as editor-in-chief ===
In fall 1992, Klein returned to Mother Jones as editor-in-chief. He brought an intense focus on how money influenced Washington politics. Mother Jones began posting its magazine content on the Internet in November 1993, the first general-interest magazine to do so. In the March/April 1996 issue, the magazine published the first "Mother Jones 400", a list of the largest individual donors to federal political campaigns along with reporting on what favors the donors received in exchange. On MotherJones.com (then known as the MoJo Wire) the donors were listed in a searchable database.

==== House Speaker's reprimand ====
Klein directed a series of exposés, called “Countdown to Indictment”, that dissected House Speaker Newt Gingrich's empire and its shady financing. Thanks in part to this series, the House Ethics Committee hired an outside counsel to investigate Gingrich. With the speaker in charge of the House, the Committee's final hearing was unilaterally reduced from five days to one afternoon, the Friday before the presidential inauguration. For the Pacifica radio stations, Klein co-hosted gavel-to-gavel live coverage with Amy Goodman, the only media to do so. The Ethics Committee ultimately recommended that Gingrich be reprimanded and forced to pay a $300,000 fine. On January 21, 1997, the full House voted overwhelmingly to accept the committee's recommendation, the first time in its 208-year history that the House disciplined its speaker for ethical wrongdoing.

==== Bob Dole and tobacco ====
In 1996, Klein published a 40-page investigative package on the tobacco industry's attempt to roll back regulation by electing as president Bob Dole. Frank Rich wrote about the Mother Jones package in The New York Times and highlighted Klein's claim that the 1996 presidential election was "The Tobacco Election". Dole was subsequently forced by reporters to defend his support by and for the tobacco industry. He stumbled, saying nicotine was no more addictive than milk. Rather than appearing corrupt, Dole seemed out-of-touch and his image suffered.

==== Exposing the Republicans' image-maker ====
In 1997, Klein accepted and fortified an investigative piece on Republican image-maker Donald Sipple, who had crafted character campaigns for Bob Dole, George Bush, George W. Bush, and Pete Wilson while trashing the personal reputations of their Democratic opponents, such as Bill Clinton, Ann Richards and Kathleen Brown. Sipple's attack ads mirrored the hidden past of a vindictive man who beat his first two wives. The story was originally written for George magazine by staffer Richard Blow, then rejected by George editor-in-chief John Kennedy, Jr. under intense pressure from Sipple and advice from Kennedy's sister Caroline. When the exposé appeared in Mother Jones, Sipple responded with a $12.6 million defamation suit, but both ex-wives vouched for the accuracy of the article. Sipple appealed all the way up to the California Supreme Court, where his suit was dismissed and Sipple was forced to pay Mother Jones' court costs. All of these exposés brought the magazine and Klein into the full glare of the talk-show circuit.

==== Controversial departure ====
Klein often took a critical stance towards traditional progressive positions. A special issue on spirituality published during the 1997 holiday season was praised by columnists such as The Washington Post’s William Raspberry and sold well, but also led to Klein’s resignation from Mother Jones because of the parent board’s displeasure.

=== Later work ===
Klein subsequently taught journalism at Stanford University and started a software company. He co-produced for The NewsHour with Jim Lehrer a seven-part series on China’s economy. The series won a 2006 Gerald Loeb Award, journalism’s top award for economics and business reporting, in the Television Enterprise category. With Paolo Pontoniere, Klein authored pieces about secret trade-offs made by the U.S. prior to the Iraq War and about the mysterious deaths of two European telecom engineers immediately after they discovered sophisticated bugs planted in the hubs of their telecommunications systems.

== Criticism ==
Charles Peters, editor-in-chief of the Washington Monthly, said in The New York Times: "There has been this strong movement on the left that is trying to free themselves from the automatic clichés of the left. That is praiseworthy. But I think Jeff and all the former left is in danger of losing the passion for the downtrodden and losing touch with the people I worry most about: the working poor and the lower middle class." A San Francisco Chronicle article said Klein's editorial positions were but one side of a split between two progressive camps. “The rift at San Francisco's MoJo, a liberal standard-bearer since its founding, reflects strains within the left in general. From Washington, D.C., to Berkeley, liberals are divided over whether to adhere to 1960s-rooted values or to rethink approaches toward achieving the goals of feminism, affirmative action and other causes.” Klein's criticism that liberals’ continuing support of affirmative action was eroding their moral credibility came under fire from many, including C. Eric Lincoln, Derrick Bell and the anthology Multiculturalism in the United States.

== Personal life and death ==
Klein had two children (Jacob and Jonah) from his marriage to Judith Weinstein Klein, a therapist and authority on ethnic self-esteem. She died from cancer at their home on August 9, 1996, the couple's 25th wedding anniversary. He later married Judi Cohen, though they subsequently divorced. He was then married to Claudia Brooks Klein from 2020 until his death, from complications of familial peripheral neuropathy, at his residence in Menlo Park, California, on March 13, 2025, at the age of 77. In addition to his wife and sons, he is survived by his sister, brother, two daughters-in-law, and four grandchildren.

== Quotes ==
- "Because I'm technologically able to find a like-minded person on the other side of the globe, I'm also more interested in making friends with my next-door neighbor." − Jeffrey Klein, Quoteworld
- "Marx did not recognize that our desire to connect with a transcendent power runs even deeper than our drive for economic satisfaction. Each of us seeks. How we honor each other's search will tell the tale of the next millennium." − Jeffrey Klein
