= Collier Prize for State Government Accountability =

Journalism award

The Collier Prize for State Government Accountability is an annual American journalism award established in 2019 by the University of Florida College of Journalism and Communications. The prize recognizes outstanding investigative and political reporting focused on state government accountability and is presented at the White House Correspondents’ Association dinner.

== History ==
The prize was created to encourage in-depth coverage of state government after Nathan S. Collier, a descendant of Peter Fenelon Collier, founder of Collier’s Weekly, initiated an annual donation to the University. Each year, the Collier Prize awards first, second, and third place honors to journalistic works that exemplify excellence in state government reporting. First prize is $25,000, second is $5,000 and third is $2,500. Entries are accepted from all professional news organizations, regardless of platform or medium, including print, digital, broadcast and radio outlets.

In 2024, Nathan Collier made an $8 million gift to the University of Florida College of Journalism and Communications to permanently endow the prize and establish an annual symposium on state government-related accountability journalism.

The journalism prize is administered by the University of Florida College of Journalism and Communications, with oversight from an appointed director.

Collier Prize for State Government Accountability award statue

=== Winners ===
Year	Winner	Winning project/work	Description
2026	KARE 11	Housing Hustle	Investigation into Medicare fraud scheme within Minnesota's Housing Stabilization.
2025	Associated Press	Prison to Plate: Profiting Off America’s Captive Workforce	Investigation into the prison labor industrial complex.
2024	The Texas Tribune, ProPublica, and Frontline	Unprepared	Investigation into the law-enforcement response to the Uvalde school shooting
2023	Los Angeles Times	Black Men Get Brunt Of State Bar’s Discipline	Investigation into the State Bar of California to regulate and enforce the integrity of lawyers in the state.
2022	Miami Herald and ProPublica	Birth & Betrayal	Investigation into Florida's oversight of children who suffered catastrophic brain injuries at birth.
2021	The Marshall Project and Mississippi Today	Mississippi Penal System, Uncovered	Investigation into violence, financial improprieties, and debtors' prisons within the Mississippi penal system.
2020	The Oregonian	Polluted by Money	Investigation into unlimited campaign contributions and oversight of political spending in Oregon.
