= Atrium Award =

Journalism award

Coordinates: 33°57′09″N 83°22′25″W

- Awarded for: Excellence in journalism coverage of the garment industry
- Location: Georgia, United States
- Presented by: University of Georgia School of Journalism and Mass Communication and AmericasMart
- First award: 1980
- Website: grady.uga.edu

The Atrium Award is an award for excellence in journalism coverage of the garment industry. It is given by the University of Georgia's Henry W. Grady College of Journalism and Mass Communication and AmericasMart, the world's largest permanent trade center for wholesale trade and the only permanent international trade center in the United States. The award was established in 1980 to "recognize outstanding work of writers and photojournalists who cover the nation's garment industry and to encourage them to put forth their best efforts." Past Atrium Award winners include the San Francisco Chronicle, Detroit Free Press, and Los Angeles Times, as well as individuals such as Sandra Eisert (San Jose Mercury-News) and Jeff Wilkerson (St. Louis Magazine).

== See also ==
- List of fashion awards
- AmericasMart
- Henry W. Grady College of Journalism and Mass Communication
