= Sunday magazine =

Publication inserted into a Sunday newspaper

A Sunday magazine is a publication inserted into a Sunday newspaper. It also has been known as a Sunday supplement, Sunday newspaper magazine or Sunday magazine section. Traditionally, the articles in these magazines cover a wide range of subjects, and the content is not as current and timely as the rest of the newspaper.

== United States ==
=== 19th century ===
With the rise of rotogravure printing in the 19th century, Sunday magazines offered better reproduction of photographs, and their varied contents could include columns, serialized novels, short fiction, illustrations, cartoons, puzzles and assorted entertainment features.

Janice Hume, instructor in journalism history at Kansas State University, noted, "The early Sunday magazines were latter 19th-century inventions and really linked to the rise of the department store and wanting to get those ads to women readers."

In 1869, the San Francisco Chronicle published San Francisco Chronicle Magazine, regarded as the first Sunday magazine, and the Chicago Inter Ocean added color to its supplement. The New York Times Magazine was published on September 6, 1896, and it contained the first photographs ever printed in that newspaper. During the 1890s, publications were inserted into Joseph Pulitzer's New York World and William Randolph Hearst's New York Journal. Hearst had the eight-page Women's Home Journal and the 16-page Sunday American Magazine, which later became The American Weekly. In November 1896, Morrill Goddard, editor of the New York Journal from 1896 to 1937, launched Hearst's Sunday magazine, later commenting, "Nothing is so stale as yesterday's newspaper, but The American Weekly may be around the house for days or weeks and lose none of its interest."

=== 20th century ===
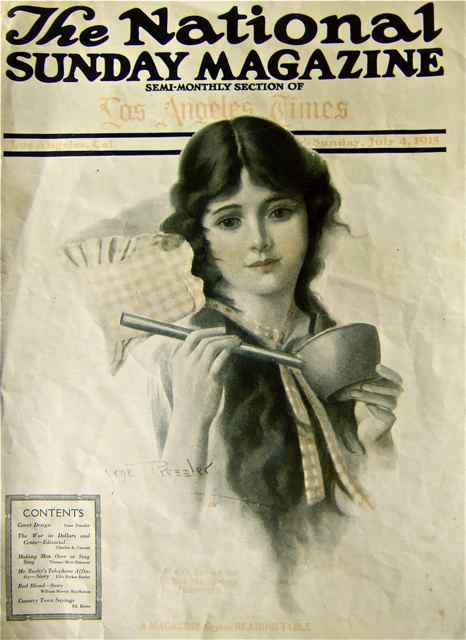
The July 4, 1915 cover of The National Sunday Magazine, published by The Los Angeles Times

Joseph P. Knapp published the Associated Sunday Magazine from 1903 to 1905. His Every Week, published between 1915 and 1918, reached a circulation of more than 550,000. This was, however, not a Sunday magazine—because it appeared separately on newsstands on Monday mornings.

The National Sunday Magazine was published on a semimonthly basis during the early part of the 20th century by the Abbott & Briggs Company. Wilbur Griffith was the editor.

The New York Herald Tribune Sunday Magazine began in 1927. This Week magazine was launched February 24, 1935. At its peak in 1963, This Week was distributed with 42 Sunday newspapers having a total circulation of 14.6 million. Prior to 1942, it was similar to the Sunday Grit Story Section, in that it carried 80% fiction. This Week dropped serials in 1940, and in 1942, it shifted the balance to 52% articles and 48% fiction. The magazine was discontinued in 1969.

Founded in 1941, Parade became the most widely read magazine in the United States with a circulation of 32.4 million and a readership of nearly 72 million. Parade ceased publication on December 31, 2023.

Family Weekly was circulated in smaller cities and towns beginning in 1953. It was later incorporated into USA Weekend, which began in 1985. By the 1990s, more than half of American newspapers carried USA Weekend or Parade. USA Weekend, which reported a 22 million circulation in the 1990s, could be inserted into Friday, Saturday or Sunday newspapers, while Parade restricted distribution only to Sunday papers. USA Weekend ceased publication on December 28, 2014.

In 1977, The Washington Post's Sunday supplement, Potomac Magazine, became The Washington Post Magazine. Its final issue appeared on Christmas Day, 2022.

In 1994, Parade began React magazine, aimed at middle-schoolers. It was offered only to Parade-subscribing newspapers. After five years, React was in 225 newspapers with over four million circulation. Newspapers used React in their Newspapers in Education programs.

== United Kingdom ==
Most of the UK Saturday and Sunday broadsheet and tabloid papers include one or more supplements. These include the Guardian "Weekend" magazine and "Guide" arts listings and the Sunday Telegraph "Stella" and "Seven" magazines.

== See also ==
- Sunday Magazine Editors Association
- Mabel Craft Deering, first woman to edit a Sunday magazine
