= Joseph Costa (photographer) =

American photographer (1904–1988)

Joseph Costa (January 3, 1904 - August 1, 1988) was an American newspaper photographer and founder of the National Press Photographers Association.

Costa was born on January 3, 1904, in Caltabellotta, Sicily, Italy.

For nearly 44 years Costa was photographer, chief photographer, or photo supervisor on the New York Morning World, New York Morning News, New York Daily News, New York Daily Mirror, and King Features Syndicate. Until 1985, he taught photojournalism at Ball State University, which awarded him an honorary degree when he retired.

Costa wrote a number of articles and essays on freedom of the press, in one of which he states:

"The proper dissemination of news by a free press is not accomplished solely by the printed word. There is a visual record, too, that must be transmitted to do the complete job. The object of this complete job, of course, is the informed public on which our democracy stands."

Costa was a founder, first president, and chairman of the board of the National Press Photographers Association and edited the official NPPA magazine, National Press Photographer, from 1946 to 1966. The NPPA's Joseph Costa Award and its Joseph Costa Award for Courtroom Photography are named in his honor.
