= Peter Menzel =

American journalist

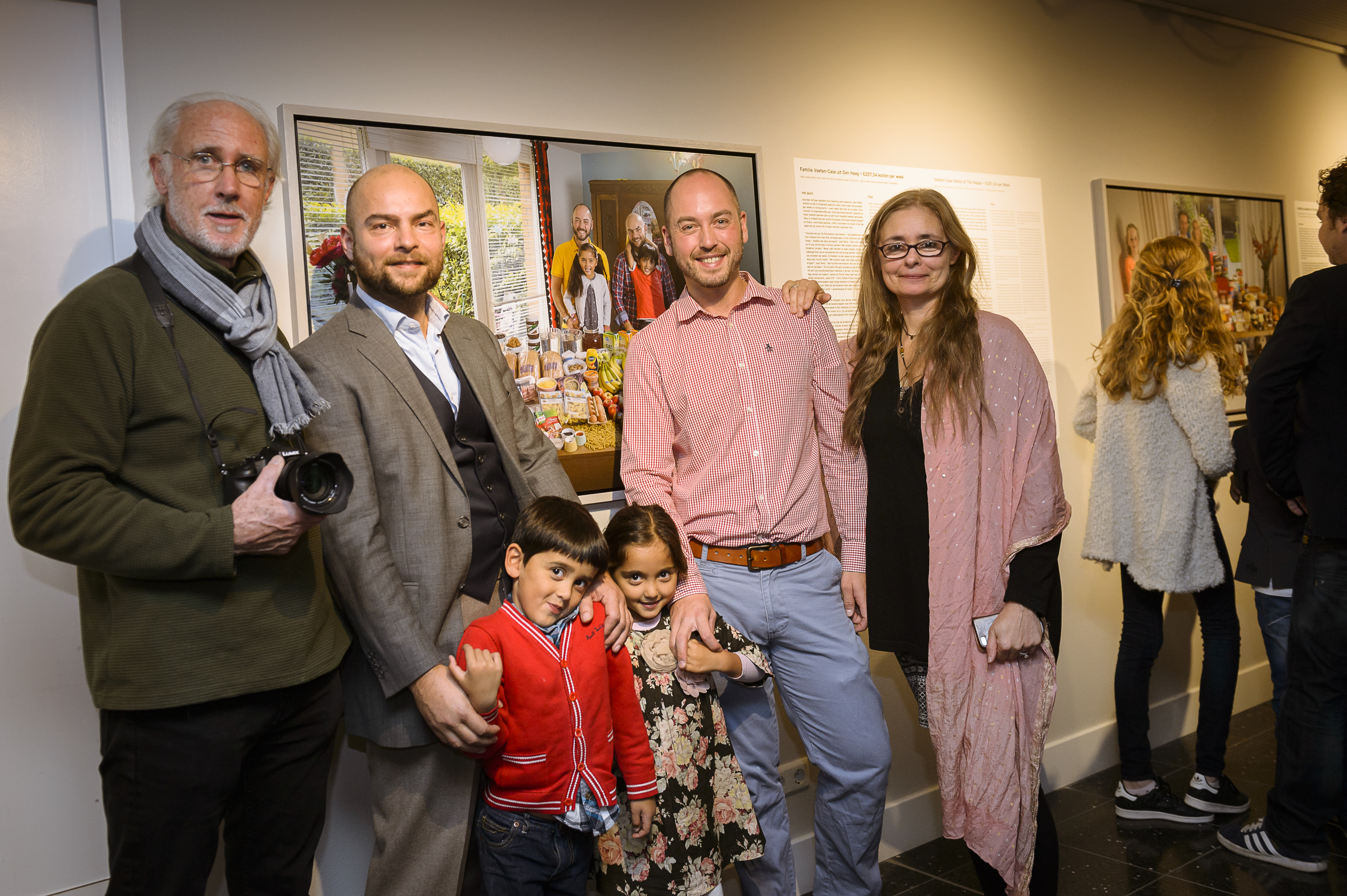
Peter Menzel (left) at the opening of his exhibition Hungry Planet, Photographymuseum The Hague

Peter John Menzel (born February 7, 1948) is an American freelance photojournalist and author, best known for his coverage of scientific and technological subjects. His work has appeared in many national and international publications including National Geographic, Forbes, Fortune, Wired, Geo, Stern, Paris Match, Life and Le Figaro. In conjunction with his wife, writer/producer Faith D'Aluisio, Menzel has also published six books including Material World: A Global Family Portrait (1994); Women in the Material World (1996); Man Eating Bugs: The Art & Science of Eating Insects (1998); Robo sapiens: Evolution of a New Species; Hungry Planet: What The World Eats (2005). He is the founder of Peter Menzel Photography and Material World Books.

== Biography ==
Born in Hartford, Connecticut, Menzel became a professional photographer in 1970 and soon began to focus on high-tech stories, including virtual reality, DNA fingerprinting, micro-machines and solar cars. But he has also covered more traditional photojournalistic subjects. His work on the Kuwait oil well fires of 1991 ran as a 26-page cover story for German Geo and won a Communication Arts award.

His photographs have been exhibited at the Nobel Peace Center, Oslo, Norway; The United Nations, the Museum of Science and Industry in Chicago, the National Museum of Natural History, the Museum of Science in Boston, and Visa Pour L'Image, the annual international photojournalism congress in Perpignan, France.

Menzel and D'Aluisio live in Napa, California. They have four adult sons.

== Books ==
=== Material World, A Global Family Portrait ===
This work of photojournalism centers around family portraits with material possessions of statistically average families around the world and has been excerpted worldwide. (Sierra Club Books, 1994).

=== Women in the Material World ===
The 1996 companion volume to Material World, this book focuses on women from 24 different countries, along with short essays on subjects such as marriage, childcare, and work.

=== Man Eating Bugs: The Art & Science of Eating Insects ===
A travelog through 13 countries includes photographs, interviews, cultural inquiries, and recipes about the human consumption of insects. (Ten Speed Press, 1998).

=== Robo sapiens: Evolution of New Species ===
Sir Arthur C. Clarke wrote: “This is one of the most mind-stretching—and frightening—books I’ve ever read. It’s also a tour de force of photography: the images reveal a whole new order of creation about to come into existence.” (The MIT Press, 2000.)

=== Hungry Planet: What the World Eats ===
Similar in style to Material World, Hungry Planet presents what 30 families eat in a week through a combination of photographs and essays. Each family's profile includes descriptions about their food purchases in USD and a portrait of the family surrounded by a week's worth of groceries. The book shows families from 24 countries, offers essays from Michael Pollan, Charles C. Mann, and Marion Nestle, among others. (Ten Speed Press/Material World Books, 2005).

=== What I Eat: Around the World in 80 Diets ===
Real Meals: a recent day's food of 80 people in 30 countries. The centerpiece of each photoessay is a portrait of the subject with that day's worth of food and an exhaustively researched list detailing every item consumed, along with the total calorie count. Included are essays by seven authors that provide even more food for thought. (Ten Speed Press/Material World Books, 2010)

== Awards ==
- 2010 — Jane Grigson Award IACP (What I Eat: Around the World in 80 Diets)
- 2006 – Book of the Year, James Beard Foundation (Hungry Planet)
- 2006 – Best Writings on Food, James Beard Foundation (Hungry Planet)
- 2006 – Book of the Year, Harry Chapin World Hunger Media Foundation (Hungry Planet)
- 2005 – Award of Excellence, Picture of the Year Foundation (Hungry Planet)
- 2004 – Picture of the Year, National Press Photographers Association
- 2000 – First Place, Science Photography, World Press Photo Foundation (Robo Sapiens)
- 1999 – Best Writings on Food, James Beard Foundation (Man Eating Bugs)
- 1998 – Audie Award for Abridged Nonfiction, Audio Publishing Association (Women in the Material World)
- 1991 – World Press Photo Foundation, First Place Science (Biosphere Lightning)
- 1985 – Picture of the Year, National Press Photographers Association
