= Henry R. Luce Award =

The Henry R. Luce Award is an award in the field of journalism given by Time Inc. to recognize "editorial excellence in print, digital and multimedia categories"; it is presented annually to articles and blog posts published in Time Inc. media outlets. The award serves as a memorial for American journalist Henry Robinson Luce (1898–1967).

== See also ==
- Henry R. Luce
