= John Murphy Award for Excellence in Copy Editing =

Local writing award, Texas, USA

The John Murphy Award for Excellence in Copy Editing is given annually by the Texas Daily Newspaper Association (TDNA). Consideration is given only to submissions by Texas daily newspapers that are members of TDNA.

The award alternates every year between papers with circulations of less than 100,000 and those with more than 100,000. The winner receives $1,000. Four people have earned the award twice: Carmelita Bevill in 1987 and 1992, Hank Glamann in 1990 and 1994, Dave Thomas in 1995 and 1997 and Vic Odegar in 2003 and 2005.

The award honors John Murphy, who served as executive vice president of TDNA from 1952 to 1985. Murphy died in 2007.

== Winners ==
1. 2008—Stephanie Milner, Houston Chronicle
2. 2007—Matt Dulin, Beaumont Enterprise
3. 2006—Daniel Purschwitz, Fort Worth Star-Telegram
4. 2005—Vic Odegar, Beaumont Enterprise
5. 2004—Chris Borniger, The Dallas Morning News
6. 2003—Vic Odegar, Beaumont Enterprise
7. 2002 -- Scott Mitchell, Fort Worth Star-Telegram
8. 2001—Summer Blackwell, San Angelo Standard-Times
9. 2000—Tim Sager, Fort Worth Star-Telegram
10. 1999—Melani Angell, San Angelo Standard-Times
11. 1998—Karen Patterson, The Dallas Morning News
12. 1997—Dave Thomas, Beaumont Enterprise
13. 1996—Paul A. McGrath, Houston Chronicle
14. 1995—Dave Thomas, San Angelo Standard-Times
15. 1994—Hank Glamann, Houston Chronicle
16. 1993—Diane Bowen, Bryan-College Station Eagle
17. 1992—Carmelita Bevill, Fort Worth Star-Telegram
18. 1991—Scott Walker, Bryan-College Station Eagle
19. 1990—Hank Glamann, Houston Chronicle
20. 1989—Beth Copeland, Corpus Christi Caller-Times
21. 1988—Anthony Shuga, Austin American-Statesman
22. 1987—Carmelita Bevill, Bryan-College Station Eagle
