= Phil Bronstein =

American journalist and editor

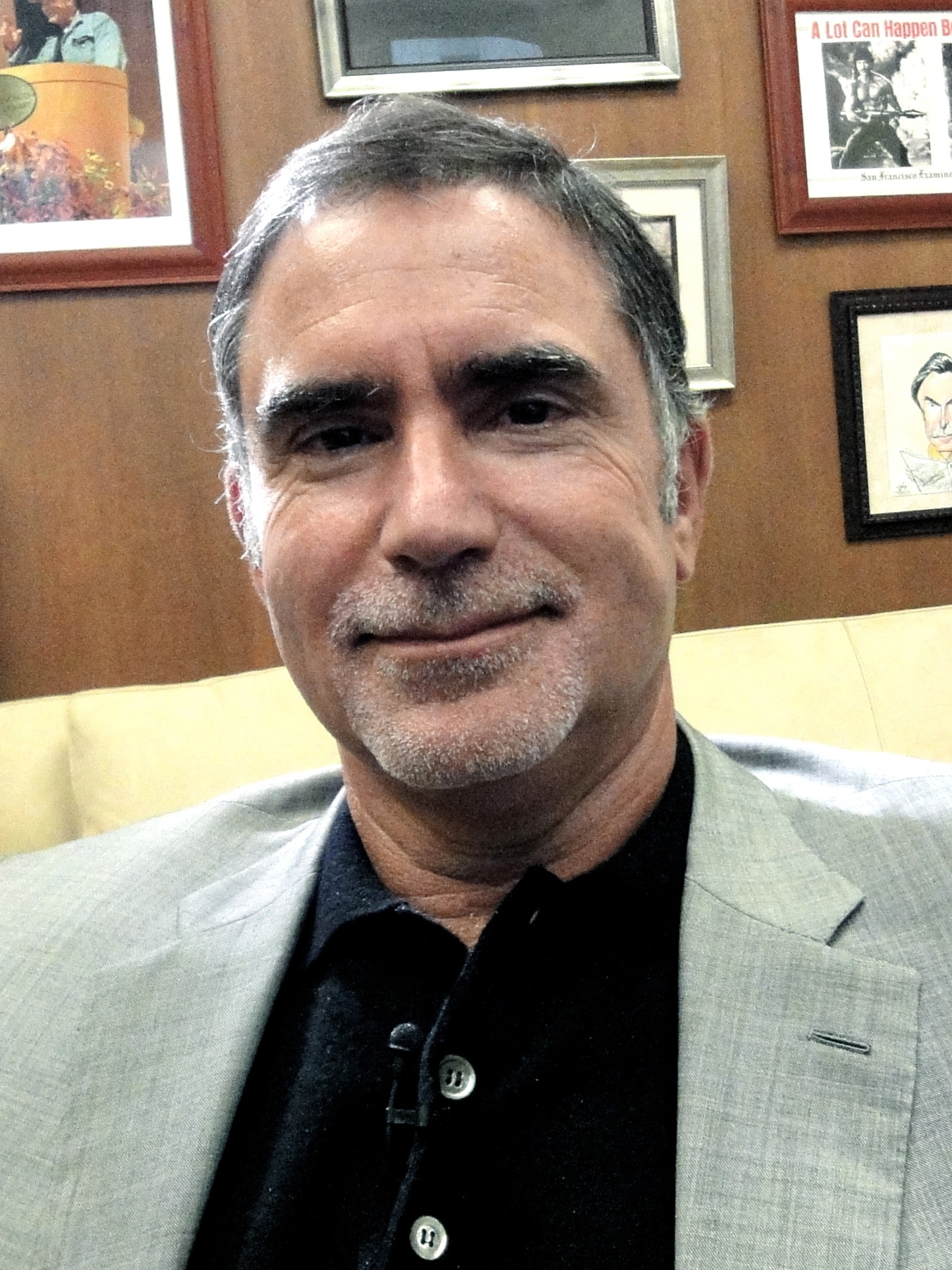
- Born: October 4, 1950 (age 76); Atlanta, Georgia, U.S.
- Occupations: Executive Chair, Center for Investigative Reporting
- Known for: Journalism
- Spouses: Gillian Wallace (div. 1984) Sharon Stone (m. 1998; div. 2004) Christine Borders (m. 2006)
- Children: 3

Phil Bronstein (born October 4, 1950) is an American journalist and editor. He serves as executive chair of the board for the Center for Investigative Reporting in Berkeley, California. He is best known for his work as a war correspondent and investigative journalist. In 1986, he was a finalist for the Pulitzer Prize for his reporting on the fall of Philippine dictator Ferdinand Marcos. Later, he held leadership positions with the San Francisco Examiner, San Francisco Chronicle, and Hearst Newspapers Corporation.

== Early life ==
Bronstein was born in Atlanta, Georgia, on October 4, 1950. As a child, Bronstein's family moved frequently. Much of his youth was spent in Montreal, Canada. Eventually, he settled in California. Bronstein attended but did not graduate from the University of California, Davis. While at Davis, he got his first taste of journalism. He wrote movie reviews for the school paper.

== Career ==
Bronstein's first professional job was as a reporter for KQED-TV in San Francisco. In 1980, The San Francisco Examiner hired him as a beat reporter. He went on to report from conflict areas around the world as a foreign correspondent for eight years, such as Peru, the Middle East, El Salvador and the Philippines.

In 1991, Bronstein was promoted to the executive editor position at the Examiner. He held that position until 2000. When an alligator escaped into a city lake in 1996, Bronstein arrived in scuba gear to assist with the capture, but police turned him away.

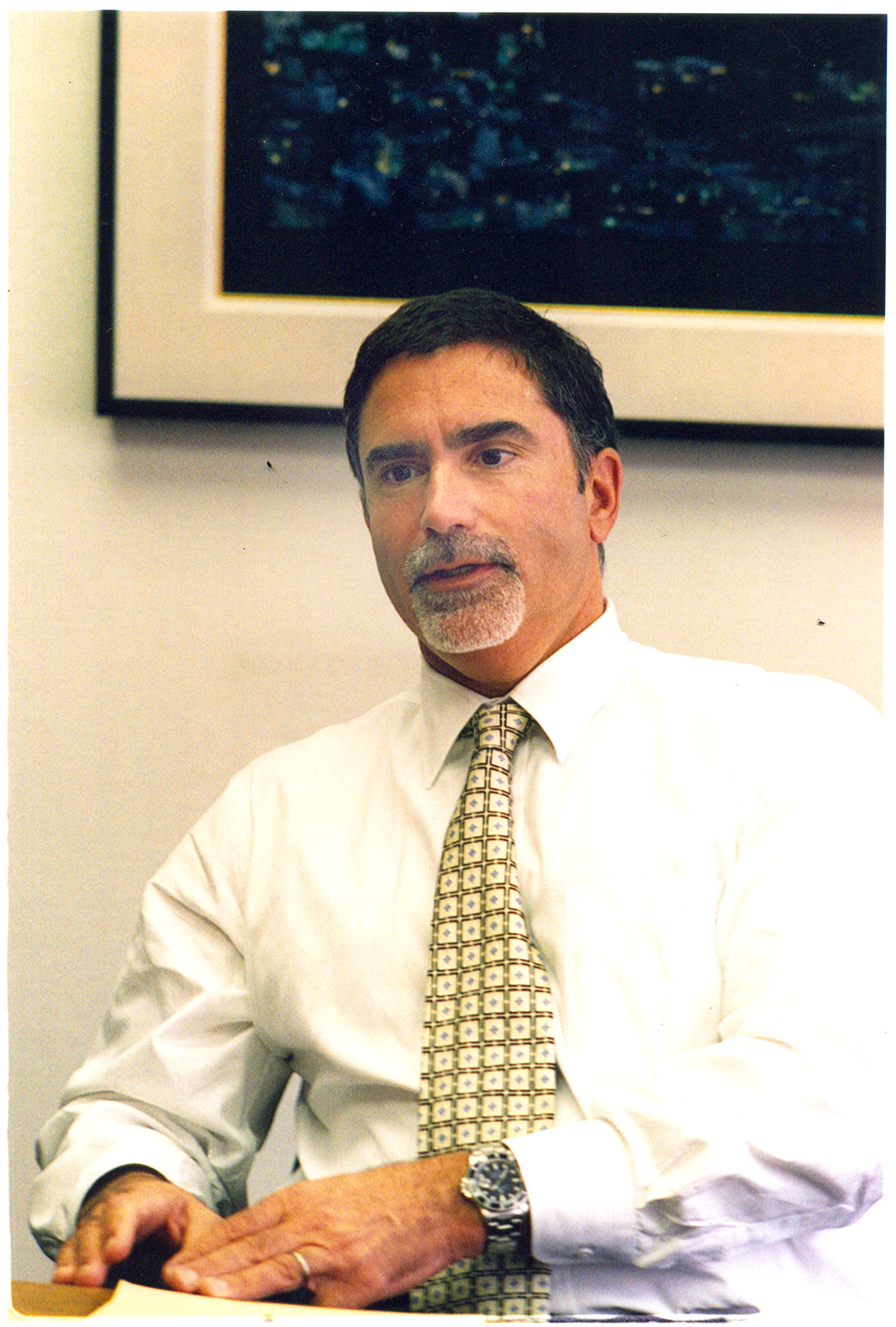
Bronstein was senior vice president and executive editor of the San Francisco Chronicle before serving as executive chairman of the board for the Center for Investigative Reporting.

Hearst Corporation, the parent company of the Examiner, bought the San Francisco Chronicle in 2000. The Chronicle was the other major daily paper for the San Francisco Bay Area. Hearst already owned the Examiner and chose to merge the two newsrooms. Bronstein became senior vice president and executive editor of the Chronicle in November 2000. Bronstein was editor after the merger, which occurred at the same time as a general decline in the newspaper industry, making the job even more difficult. Bronstein made staffing changes, created new features, and attempted to bring the Chronicle into the Internet age, all while preserving the Bay Area cultural viewpoint. In the first two years after the merger, staff was reduced from 520 to 485 and there was less content within the daily paper.

In January 2008, Hearst Corporation announced Bronstein as editor-at-large for both the Chronicle and Hearst Newspapers. In his new role, Bronstein wrote a weekly column for the Chronicle. He also wrote blog entries for SFGate.com. At the Chronicle, he was replaced as editor by Arizona Republic editor Ward Bushee.

Bronstein left Hearst Newspapers and the Chronicle in March 2012. He had been named chairman of the board for the Center for Investigative Reporting in 2011. Upon leaving the Chronicle, his role at the Center expanded.

== Personal life ==
Bronstein married actress Sharon Stone on February 14, 1998. They were unable to conceive children as Stone suffered from an autoimmune disease, resulting in several miscarriages. They adopted a baby son, Roan Joseph Bronstein in 2000. Bronstein separated from Stone and filed for divorce in 2003, while she was in recovery from a cerebrovascular event she suffered in 2001. Stone alleged in interviews that Bronstein's physical abuse of her precipitated her stroke. Bronstein and Stone completed their divorce on January 29, 2004. At first, Stone and Bronstein shared joint custody of their adopted son, Roan. In 2008, a judge gave Bronstein full custody of their son.

In 2001, Bronstein was attacked by a Komodo dragon at the Los Angeles Zoo. He was on a private tour, and a keeper had invited him into the enclosure. Bronstein was bitten on his bare foot, as the keeper had told him to take off his white shoes and socks, which the keeper stated could excite the Komodo dragon as they were the same color as the white rats the zoo fed the dragon. Although he escaped, Bronstein needed to have several tendons in his foot reattached surgically.

In 2006, Bronstein married Christine Borders, the daughter of Borders Book Store co-founder Louis Borders. She is the founder of "A Band of Wives," a social network for women. The couple has two children.

He sold his Sea Cliff, San Francisco home in 2022.

== Awards and recognition ==
In 1986, Bronstein was a finalist for the Pulitzer Prize for his reporting on the overthrow of Ferdinand Marcos, long-standing dictator of the Philippines. Bronstein's work in the Philippines also earned him awards from the Associated Press, the Overseas Press Club, the World Affairs Council, and the Media Alliance.
