= Anthony Shadid Award for Journalism Ethics =

The Anthony Shadid Award for Journalism Ethics is a journalism award presented annually by the Center for Journalism Ethics at the University of Wisconsin–Madison. It was originally named Wisconsin Commitment to Journalism Ethics Award in 2010, and was renamed after journalist and alumnus Anthony Shadid who died in 2012. According to the Center website, "the Shadid Award recognizes ethical decisions in reporting stories in any medium, including print, broadcast and digital, by journalists working for established news organizations or publishing individually."

== Background ==
Anthony Shadid was a foreign correspondent for The New York Times based in Baghdad and Beirut who won the Pulitzer Prize for International Reporting twice, in 2004 and 2010. Shadid, a graduate of UW-Madison, died in 2012 while crossing the Syrian border on a reporting assignment for The New York Times. Shadid sat on the Center for Journalism Ethics advisory board and strongly supported its efforts to promote public interest journalism and to stimulate discussion about journalism ethics. In December 2010, Shadid gave the inaugural CJE ethics lecture. His powerful speech, "The Truths We Tell: Reporting on Faith, War and the Fate of Iraq," conveys Shadid's commitment to the highest ideals of journalism.

In 2010–2013, the recipients were limited to those in the Wisconsin area. Starting with 2014, the nominations were accepted from journalists around the world.

== Format ==
The Shadid Award is different from other journalism prizes in that it seeks to recognize the difficult, behind-the-scenes decisions reporters make in pursuing high-impact stories and in fulfilling their ethical obligations to sources, to people caught up in news events, and to the public at large.

This national recognition focuses on current journalism and does not include books, documentaries and other long-term projects. Individuals or news organizations may nominate themselves or others.

Winners receive a $1,000 prize and travel expenses to accept the award at a ceremony in either New York City or Washington, DC. At the award ceremony, reporters discuss their reporting and how they produced the winning story.

== List of winners ==
Year	Recipient	Notes	Refs
2010	Tom Bier of WISC-TV	Noted as the "Dean of Madison journalists," Bier retired from WISC-TV3 in 2015	
2011	Dan Flannery of Appleton Post-Crescent	Flannery retired from the Post-Crescent in 2015 after 28 years	
2012	Steven T. Lovejoy of The Journal Times (Racine, Wisconsin)	Lovejoy, a veteran of the newspaper industry, was recognized for his lifelong practice of applying the highest ethical standards to his work	
2013	Mark Johnson of Milwaukee Journal Sentinel	Johnson's series, "Uniquely Human: The Science of Gender," investigated the role of nature and nurture in gender identity	
2014	Associated Press: Adam Goldman, Matt Apuzzo and Ted Bridis	In their reporting about the disappearance of Robert Levinson, the reporters found that Levinson, who went missing while in Iran, was employed by the CIA, even as the agency denied it to the White House, the FBI and Congress.	
2015	The Chicago Tribune team: David Jackson, Gary Marx and Duaa Eldeib, and Anthony Souffle	This investigation, which uncovered abuses in Illinois' juvenile justice system, led to the resignation of the director of the state Department of Children and Family Services	
2016	Associated Press: Martha Mendoza, Margie Mason, Robin McDowell and Esther Htusan	The "Fisherman Slaves" series exposed the abusive practices of the fishing industry in Southeast Asia, leading to the freeing of 2,000 slave laborers used by the fishing industry	
2017	Shane Bauer of Mother Jones	Bauer's "My Four Months as a Private Prison Guard" chronicles the inner workings of a private prison where the reporter went undercover	
2018	Brian Grow, John Shiffman and the Reuters team	"The Body Trade" series investigated an industry that processes and markets the body parts from recently deceased humans	
2019	Julie K. Brown and Emily Michot, Miami Herald	"Perversion of Justice" series investigated Jeffrey Epstein's plea deal	
2020	Jodi S. Cohen and Lakeidra Chavis of ProPublica and Jennifer Smith Richards of the Chicago Tribune	"The Quiet Rooms" series investigated the use of seclusion and physical restraint in Illinois public schools	
