= Malcolm Law Investigative Reporting Award =

The Malcolm Law Investigative Reporting Award (also known as the Malcolm Law Memorial Award for Investigative Journalism or Malcolm Law Award) is an award for investigative reporting established by the Tennessee Associated Press Managing Editors in 1973 to honor Malcolm Law, associate editor of The Jackson Sun, who died in December 1972.

== About the award ==
The Malcolm Law Award is recognized as one of the most prestigious awards given for journalistic accomplishment in Tennessee. The award was originally given to four winners per year in each of the Tennessee Associated Press's Divisions. When Division III and IV were combined in 2013, the number of the awards issued per year dropped to three. Divisions are divided by circulation.

== Description ==
The design of the award varies from year to year, but it almost always has the following layout set against glass, signifying transparency:

Tennessee

Associated Press

Managing Editors

Malcolm Law

Investigative Reporting

(Winner's name)

(Winner's newspaper)

(Year)

== Selection ==
The criterion for selecting the winner of the award is subject matter (40 percent), writing style (30 percent), and delivery (20 percent).
