= Zahra Hankir =

Lebanese-British journalist and editor

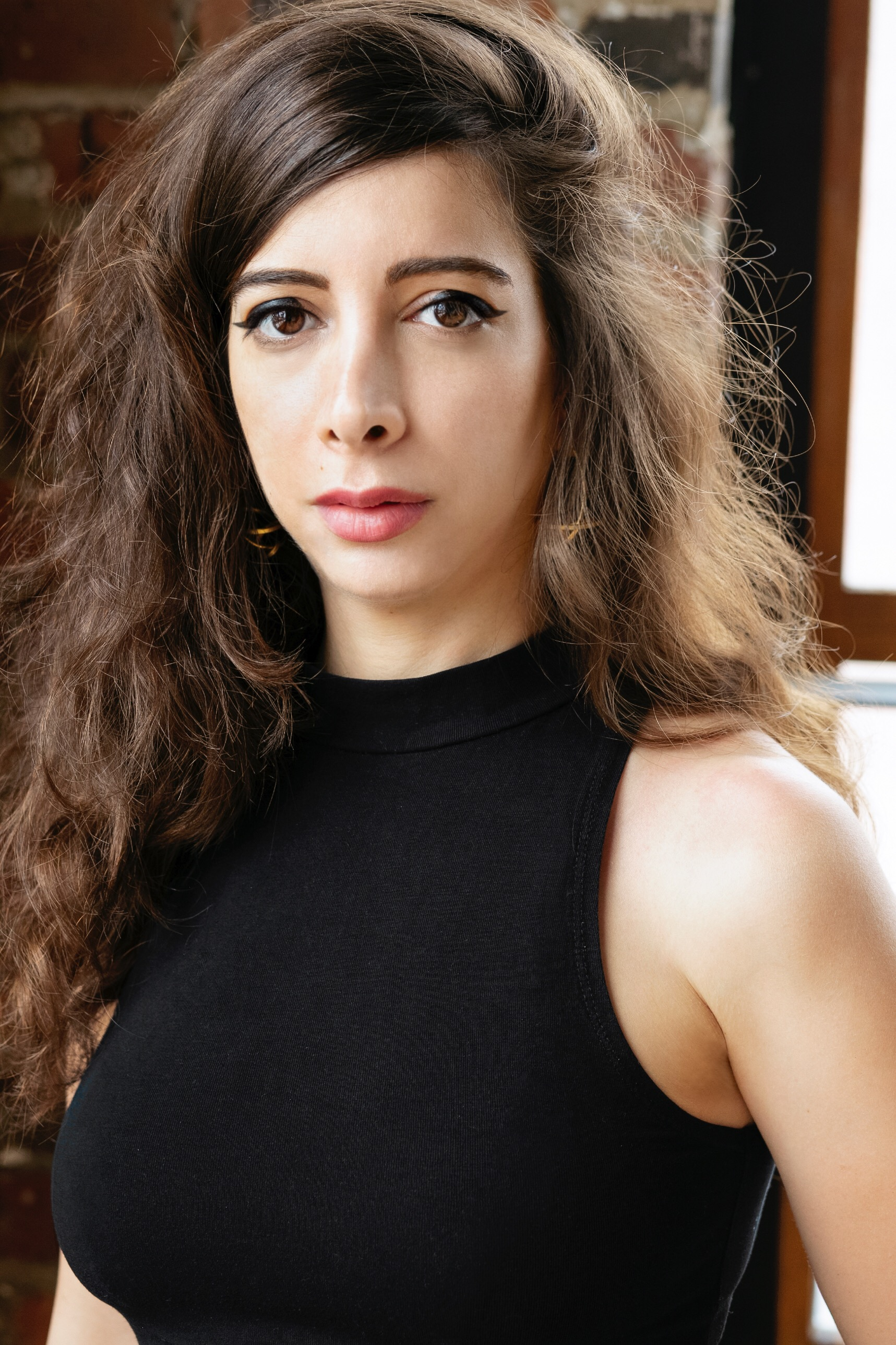
- 2019 portrait by Maria Wilson
- Occupations: Journalist and editor

Zahra Hankir (Arabic زهرة حنكير) is a Lebanese-British journalist and editor.

== Education ==
Hankir studied politics at the American University of Beirut and Middle Eastern Studies at the University of Manchester. She won a Scripps Howard Fellowship to attend the Columbia University Graduate School of Journalism.

== Career ==
Hankir worked for Bloomberg News in Dubai during the Arab Spring, covering the economy and markets. She writes about culture in the Middle East and her journalism has been featured in news publications such as BBC News, VICE News, Al Jazeera English, Literary Hub, Roads & Kingdoms, gal-dem, and elsewhere.

In March 2020 she appeared in a panel discussion at Adelaide Writers' Week, along with Omani novelist Johka Alharthi and Iranian-American journalist Azadeh Moaveni.

== Works ==
Her first book, Our Women on the Ground: Essays by Arab Women Reporting from the Arab World, featuring a foreword by Christiane Amanpour, was published by Penguin Books on 6 August 2019 in the US. It was described by Dwight Garner of the New York Times as "A stirring, provocative and well-made new anthology . . . that rewrites the hoary rules of the foreign correspondent playbook, deactivating the old clichés" and by NPR's Soraya Sarhaddi Nelson as a book that will appeal to "readers of all genders and backgrounds who want to broaden their understanding of the Arab world".

In an interview with VICE News, Hankir said without the reporting of the Arab world's women journalists: "the story of the region and its many nuances would be incomplete".

Her second book will be on the history of eyeliner. It was published in 2023 by Penguin.

== Bibliography ==
- Hankir, Zahra (6 August 2019). Our Women on the Ground. New York, New York: Penguin. ISBN 978-0-14-313341-4.
- Hankir, Zahra (14 November 2023). Eyeliner. New York: Penguin. ISBN 978-0-14-313709-2.
