= Sunday Magazine Editors Association =

American journalism organization

- Abbreviation: SUNMAG
- Formation: 1987
- Dissolved: 2001
- Purpose: Association of editors of Sunday magazines

The Sunday Magazine Editors Association, also referred to as SUNMAG, or Sunmag, was an organization of editors of Sunday newspaper magazines. It represented a majority of the major newspaper magazines in the United States. The organization was formed in 1987 and was dissolved in 2001. Presidents of the organization included editors of newspaper magazines associated with the Boston Globe, The Philadelphia Inquirer, and The Hartford Courant.

== Awards ==
The Sunday Magazine Editors Association gave out annual journalism awards to newspaper magazines, presented at the association's annual meeting. According to The Orlando Sentinel, the association's awards were considered "the premier contest in the nation for Sunday magazine journalism". Magazine category awards included: features, investigative in-depth story, profile, essay, photography (single image and multiple image), design, design (single spread) and design (multiple spread).

== History ==
The organization was formed in 1987, and in that year, over 40 Sunday newspaper magazines entered the contest competing for the award for first place in investigative writing, which was won by The Washington Post Magazine.

In 1997, The Plain Dealer decided to commission an essay from Anna Quindlen in honor of the annual meeting of the organization. The theme was Women's History Month, and of the 26 papers notified, 18 published Quindlen's essay. The Association maintains data on the number of newspapers that publish their own Sunday magazines. The organization had 46 members in 1991. In 1994 the Association had 35 members, including Akron Beacon Journal, Anchorage Daily News, Los Angeles Times, The New York Times and The Washington Post.

Ande Zellman, editor of the Boston Globe Magazine, was the association's president in 1989. Fred Mann, editor of The Philadelphia Inquirer magazine Inquirer Magazine, was president of the association in 1991. Lary Bloom, editor of Northeast, Sunday magazine of The Hartford Courant, was elected president of the organization in 1995 at its annual SunMag conference, and continued to serve in that capacity in 1996. Its president in 1999 was Steve Courtney, deputy editor of Northeast.

The Sunday Magazine Editors Association ceased to exist in 2001.

== See also ==
- National Journalism Awards
- Robert F. Kennedy Journalism Award
