= Wayne Williams =

American serial killer (born 1958)

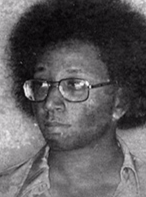
- Williams' mug shot after his arrest in 1981
- Born: Wayne Bertram Williams; May 27, 1958 (age 68); Atlanta, Georgia, U.S.
- Other names: Atlanta Monster; Atlanta Boogeyman; Atlanta Child Killer
- Height: 1.7 m (5 ft 7 in)
- Conviction: Murder (2 counts)
- Penalty: 2 consecutive life sentences

Details
- Victims: 2 (convicted); 24–30 (suspected) (attempted)
- Country: United States
- State: Georgia
- Date apprehended: June 21, 1981
- Imprisoned at: Telfair State Prison

Wayne Bertram Williams (born May 27, 1958) is an American convicted murderer and serial killer who is serving life imprisonment for the 1981 killings of two men in Atlanta, Georgia. Although never tried for the additional murders, he is also believed to be responsible for at least 24 of the thirty Atlanta murders of 1979–1981, also known as the Atlanta Child Murders.

== Early life ==
Wayne Williams, son of Homer and Faye Williams, was born on May 27, 1958, and raised in the Dixie Hills neighborhood of southwest Atlanta, Georgia. Both of his parents were teachers. Williams graduated from Douglass High School and developed a keen interest in radio and journalism. He constructed his own carrier current radio station and began frequenting stations WIGO and WAOK, where he befriended a number of the announcing crew and began dabbling in becoming a pop music producer and manager.

== Atlanta murders ==
Williams first became a suspect in the Atlanta murders on the morning of May 22, 1981, when a police surveillance team, watching the James Jackson Parkway Bridge spanning the Chattahoochee River (a spot where multiple bodies had been discovered previously), heard a "big loud splash," suggesting that something had been thrown from the bridge into the river below. The first automobile to exit the bridge after the splash, at roughly 2:50 a.m., belonged to Williams. When stopped and questioned, he told police that he was on his way to check on an address in a neighboring town ahead of an audition the following morning with a young singer named Cheryl Johnson. However, both the phone number he gave police and Cheryl Johnson turned out to be fictitious.

Two days later, on May 24, the nude body of 27-year-old Nathaniel Cater, who had been missing for four days and was last seen with Williams, was discovered in the river. The medical examiner ruled he had died of probable asphyxia but never specifically said he had been strangled. Police theorized that Williams had killed Cater and that the sound they had heard as Williams's car crossed the bridge was Cater's body hitting the water.

The results for all three of Williams's polygraph tests were inconclusive. Hairs and fibers retrieved from the body of another victim, Jimmy Ray Payne, were found to be consistent with those from Williams's home, car, and dog. Co-workers told police they had seen Williams with scratches on his face and arms around the time of the murders which, investigators surmised, could have been inflicted by victims during struggles. Williams held a press conference outside his home to proclaim his innocence, volunteering that he had taken three polygraph tests and all were inconclusive; in any event they would have been inadmissible in court.

Williams was questioned again by police for twelve hours on June 3 and June 4 at Federal Bureau of Investigation (FBI) headquarters and released without arrest or charge, but remained under surveillance.

== Arrest and trial ==
Williams was arrested on June 21, 1981, for the murders of Cater and Payne. His trial began on January 6, 1982, in Fulton County. During the two-month trial, prosecutors matched to a number of victims nineteen sources of fibers from Williams' home and car: his bedspread, bathroom, gloves, clothes, carpets, dog, and an unusual trilobal carpet fiber. Other evidence included witness testimony that placed Williams with several victims while they were alive, and inconsistencies in his accounts of his whereabouts. Williams had also lied about when the carpet was installed in his home, claiming it was installed in 1968 (which would undermine the testimony of prosecution experts, who said it was a rare type not manufactured until the 1970s) only for it to be discovered that the company that manufactured the carpet did not exist until 1971. Williams took the stand in his own defense but alienated the jury by becoming angry and combative. After twelve hours of deliberation, the jury found him guilty on February 27 of the murders of Cater and Payne. He received two consecutive life sentences. After Williams became a suspect, the killings in Atlanta stopped.

In the late 1990s, Williams filed a habeas corpus petition and requested a retrial. Butts County Superior Court judge Hal Craig denied his appeal. Georgia Attorney General Thurbert Baker said that "although this does not end the appeal process, I am pleased with the results in the habeas case" and that his office will "continue to do everything possible to uphold the conviction." In early 2004, Williams sought a retrial again, with his attorneys arguing that law enforcement officials covered up evidence of involvement by the Ku Klux Klan, and that carpet fibers purportedly linking him to the crimes would not stand up to scientific scrutiny. A federal judge rejected the request for retrial on October 17, 2006.

== Aftermath ==
Williams was never tried for any of the Atlanta Child Murders. However, police attributed twenty-two other deaths, including those of eighteen minors, to Williams.

Williams is serving his sentence at Telfair State Prison. In November 2019, he was again denied parole. He will next be eligible for parole in November 2027.

== Reopening investigations ==
Williams has maintained his innocence from the beginning and claimed that Atlanta officials covered up evidence of KKK involvement in the killings to avoid a race war in the city. His lawyers have said the conviction was a "profound miscarriage of justice" that has kept an innocent man incarcerated for the majority of his adult life and allowed the real killers to go free. In contrast, Joseph Drolet, who prosecuted Williams at trial, has stood by Williams's convictions. He has emphasized that, after Williams was arrested, "the murders stopped and there has been nothing since."

Other observers have criticized the thoroughness of the investigation and the validity of its conclusions. The author James Baldwin, in his 1985 essay The Evidence of Things Not Seen, raised questions about Williams's guilt. Members of his community and several of the victims' parents did not believe that Williams, the son of two professional teachers, could have killed so many.

In May 2005, DeKalb County Police Chief Louis Graham ordered the reopening of the murder cases of four boys killed in that county between February and May 1981, whose deaths had been attributed to Williams. The announcement was welcomed by relatives of some victims, who said they believe the wrong man was blamed for many of the murders.

Graham, who was serving as an assistant police chief in neighboring Fulton County at the time of the murders, said his decision to reopen the cases was driven solely by his belief in Williams's innocence. Former DeKalb County Sheriff Sidney Dorsey, who was an Atlanta homicide detective at the time and later convicted of murder, also said he believed Williams was wrongly blamed for the murders. "If they arrested a white guy," he said, "there would have been riots across the U.S." Dorsey died in prison while serving a life sentence after being convicted of ordering the murder of his election opponent Derwin Brown.

Fulton County authorities have not reopened any of the cases under their jurisdiction.

According to an August 2005 report, Charles T. Sanders, a white supremacist affiliated with the KKK and an early suspect in the murders, once praised the crimes in secretly recorded conversations. Although Sanders did not publicly claim responsibility for any of the deaths, he told an informant for the Georgia Bureau of Investigation in a 1981 recording that the killer had "wiped out a thousand future generations of niggers". An anonymous, alleged former friend of Sanders told documentarian Payne Lindsey (Atlanta Monster) that Sanders had taken credit for the murders mentioned in a 1986 Spin article, claiming that his brothers were also involved.

Sanders did not directly implicate the KKK or lead his friend to believe that anyone else from the organization was involved. Sanders allegedly mused over how lucky he was that he and Williams had the same carpet and that they both owned a white German Shepherd. The anonymous former friend went on to say that, "Once it was pinned on Wayne Williams, they were through. That was their way out." Police dropped the probe into possible Klan involvement when Sanders and two of his brothers passed lie detector tests in which they denied their involvement. The case was once again closed in July 2006.

Former FBI profiler John E. Douglas wrote in his book Mindhunter: Inside the FBI's Elite Serial Crime Unit that, in his opinion, "forensic and behavioral evidence points conclusively to Wayne Williams as the killer of eleven young men in Atlanta." He added, however, that he believed there was "no strong evidence linking him to all or even most of the deaths and disappearances of children in that city between 1979 and 1981".

In 2007, the FBI performed DNA tests on two human hairs found on one of the victims. The mitochondrial DNA sequence in the hairs would eliminate 99.5% of people, and 98% of African-Americans, by not matching their DNA; the sequence found matched Williams's DNA.

DNA testing was performed in 2010 on scalp hairs found on the body of eleven-year-old victim Patrick Baltazar. While the results were not firmly conclusive, the DNA sequence found appears in only twenty-nine of 1,148 African-American hair samples in the FBI's database, including that of Williams. The Baltazar case was included among ten additional victims presented to the jury at Williams's trial, although he was never charged in any of those cases.

Dog hairs found on Baltazar's body were tested in 2007 by the genetics laboratory at the University of California, Davis School of Veterinary Medicine, which found a DNA sequence also present in the Williams family's German Shepherd. However, the director of the laboratory, Elizabeth Wictum, said that, while the results were "fairly significant", they were not conclusive. Only mitochondrial DNA was tested; unlike nuclear DNA, mitochondrial DNA cannot be shown to be unique to an individual dog. The report said the hairs on the bodies contained the same DNA sequence as Williams's dog, a DNA sequence that occurs in about one in one hundred dogs. The FBI report stated that "Wayne Williams cannot be excluded" as a suspect in the case.

A Department of Justice study, released in April 2015, concluded that numerous hair analyses conducted by FBI examiners during the 1980s and 1990s "may have failed to meet professional standards." Defense attorney Lynn Whatley immediately announced that the report would form the basis for a new appeal, but prosecutors responded that hair evidence played only a minor role in Williams's conviction.

In March 2019, Atlanta Mayor Keisha Lance Bottoms and Atlanta Police Chief Erika Shields announced that officials would re-test evidence from the murders, which would be gathered by the Atlanta Police Department, Fulton County District Attorney's Office, and Georgia Bureau of Investigation. In a news conference, Bottoms said, "It may be there is nothing left to be tested. But I do think history will judge us by our actions, and we will be able to say we tried."

In 2019, two Atlanta men, Derwin Davis and Isaac Rogers, claimed that Williams had attempted to abduct them in 1979 and 1981 respectively.

== Media ==
Williams appears as the main antagonist in several media portrayals of the case. He was first depicted in the 1985 television miniseries The Atlanta Child Murders and was played by Calvin Levels. In 2000, Showtime released a drama film titled Who Killed Atlanta's Children? with Clé Bennett playing Williams. In 2018, Williams and the Atlanta Child Murders were the subject of the true crime podcast Atlanta Monster, hosted by Payne Lindsey and co-produced by Tenderfoot TV and HowStuffWorks. In 2019, Williams was featured in season 2 of the Netflix series Mindhunter alongside others such as Charles Manson and David Berkowitz; Williams was portrayed by Christopher Livingston.

Tayari Jones's 2002 novel Leaving Atlanta, which portrays a fictionalised version of the Atlanta child murders, features a man heavily implied to be Williams at the end of the second chapter, "The Opposite Direction of Home". Williams is shown picking up Rodney Green, a black teenager who has run away from home, after showing him a fake police badge; in the next chapter, "Sweet Pea", Rodney is said to have become the killer's latest victim.

== See also ==
- Lonnie David Franklin, a serial killer whose victims were exclusively African-American people
- Samuel Little, a serial killer whose victims were mostly African-American women

General:

- List of serial killers in the United States
- List of serial killers by number of victims

== Bibliography ==
- Baldwin, J. (1985). The Evidence of Things Not Seen. New York: Holt, Rinehart and Winston. ISBN 978-0-03-005529-4.
- Whittington-Egan, R.; Whittington-Egan, M. (1992). The Murder Almanac. Glasgow: Neil Wilson Publishing. ISBN 978-1-897784-04-4.
- Wynn, D. (1996). On Trial for Murder: Over 200 of the most dramatic trials of the 20th century. London: Pan. ISBN 978-0-330-33947-6.
