= Madison McGhee =

American Producer and Host

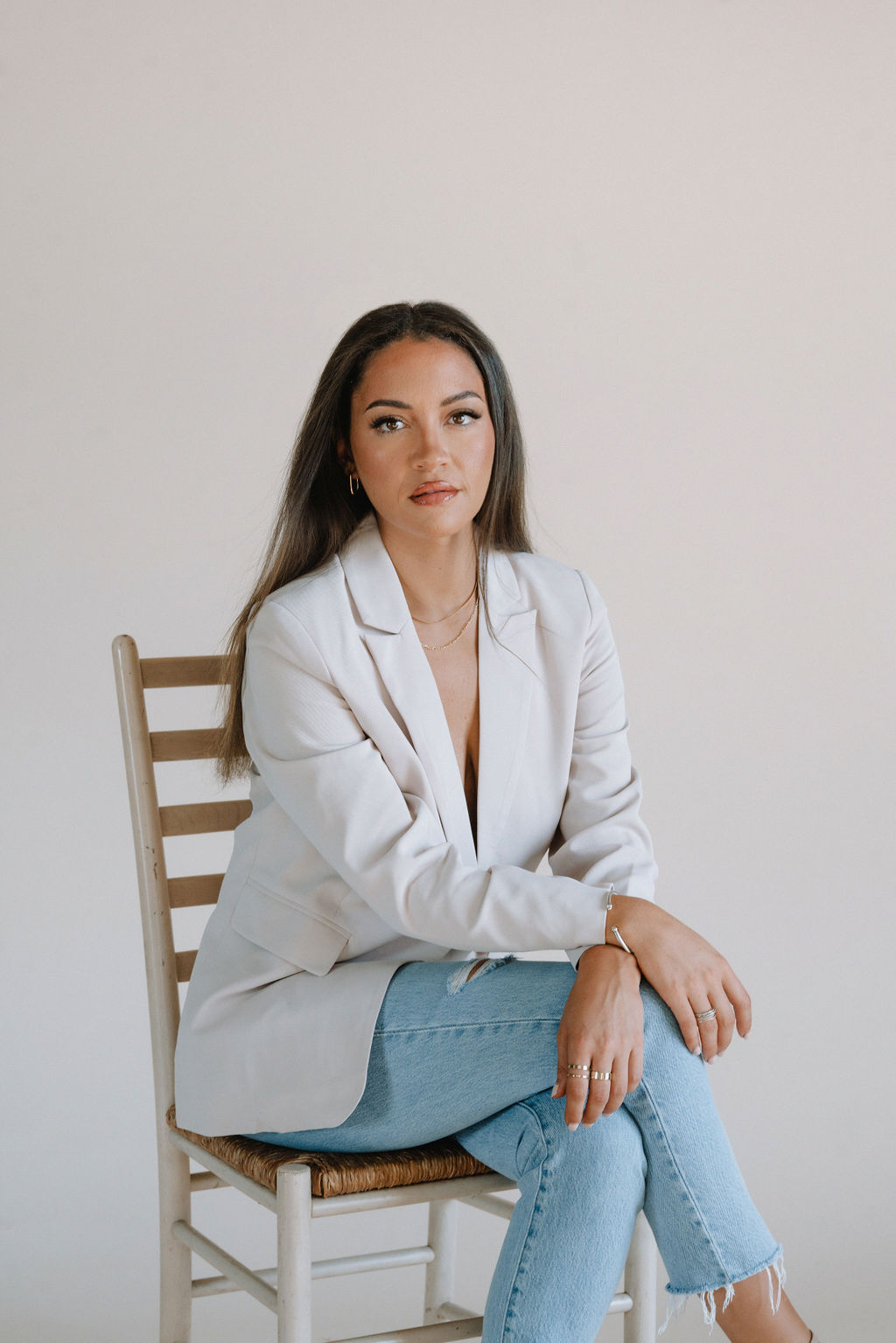
- Born: July 23, 1995 (age 31); Wheeling, West Virginia
- Occupations: Producer, Filmmaker, Director, Host
- Known for: Ice Cold Case
- Parents: John Cornelius McGhee (father); Glenda Hawley (mother)
- Relatives: Alyssa McGhee (sister)
- Website: madison-mcghee.com

Madison McGhee is American producer, filmmaker, director, and podcast host. She is best known for creating and hosting the investigative podcast, Ice Cold Case, which is also her debut podcast.

== Early life ==
McGhee was born in Wheeling, West Virginia to Glenda Hawley and John Cornelius McGhee. She moved to Charleston, West Virginia with her mother when she was less than a year old. She spent her early childhood making home videos and writing show concepts. YouTube was created when McGhee was in middle school and that's when she started making comedy videos. Eventually that side hobby became a career path and McGhee started taking the art more seriously. After creating multiple mini doc-series on her YouTube channel, McGhee was inspired to make content that mattered and to do it on a big scale. She attended the College of Charleston, a liberal arts university in Charleston, South Carolina and in 2015 graduated at nineteen years old with a Bachelor's degree in Communication.

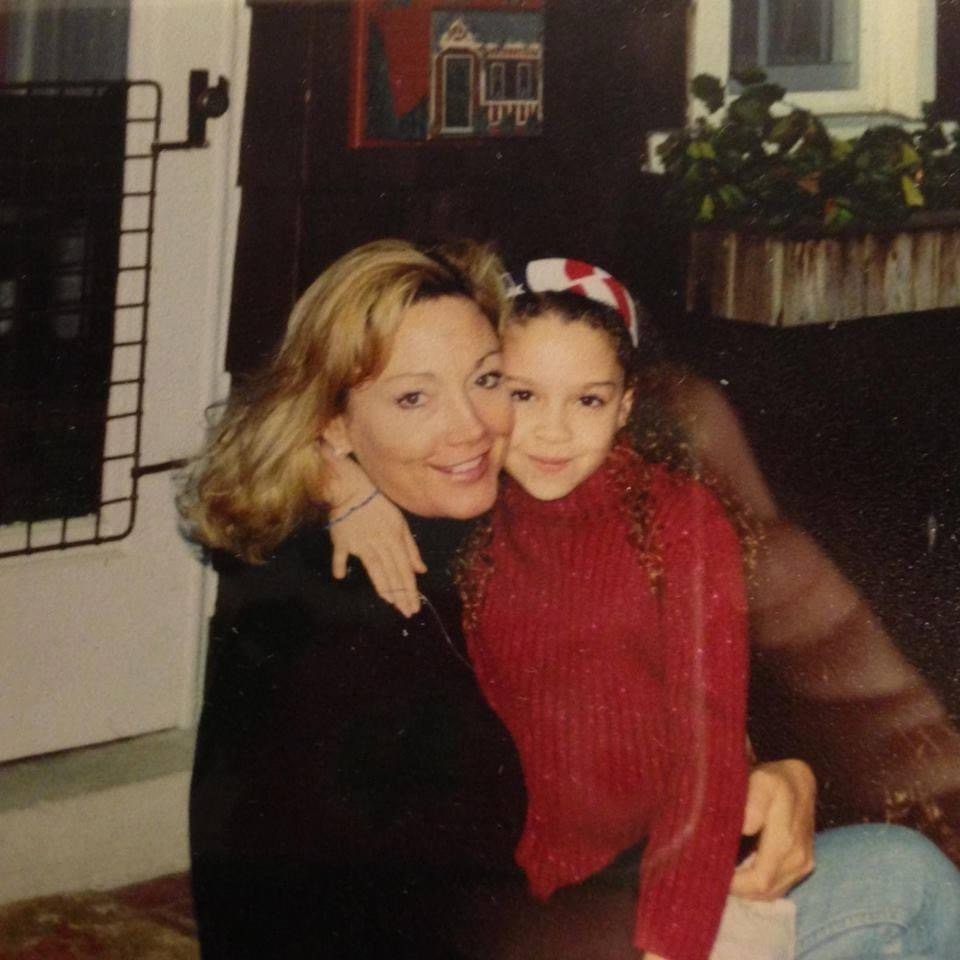
Madison and her mother, Glenda Hawley, in front her childhood home in Charleston, West Virginia

== Career ==
=== Ice Cold Case ===
McGhee was introduced to Up and Vanished by Payne Lindsey and Tenderfoot TV and Serial by Sarah Koenig and This American Life when they both premiered in 2016. This style of investigative journalism struck a cord with McGhee. As someone who grew up a fan of true crime and watched shows like Cold Case Files and America's Most Wanted, podcasts were a new medium to hear these stories. But not only was McGhee interested in these cases, she had recently learned that she was in the middle of a cold case herself. In 2002, McGhee's father John Cornelius McGhee died, but McGhee thought he had died of a heart attack. When she was sixteen that she learned he was murdered in his home in Belmont County, Ohio, and the killer was never caught.

After hearing these podcasts, it gave McGhee the idea to investigate her own father's murder. What existed as an idea for several years finally manifested itself in 2020, when she called the Belmont County Sheriff's Department and requested the police files. This sent her on a long journey learning about her family, her dad, and the suspicious circumstances surrounding his murder. After over three years of investigating, McGhee launched her debut podcast, Ice Cold Case.

This project introduced McGhee to the world of True crime. Today, she uses her platform to help making progress towards solving her dad's murder and also help others whose cases might not catch the attention of mainstream media.

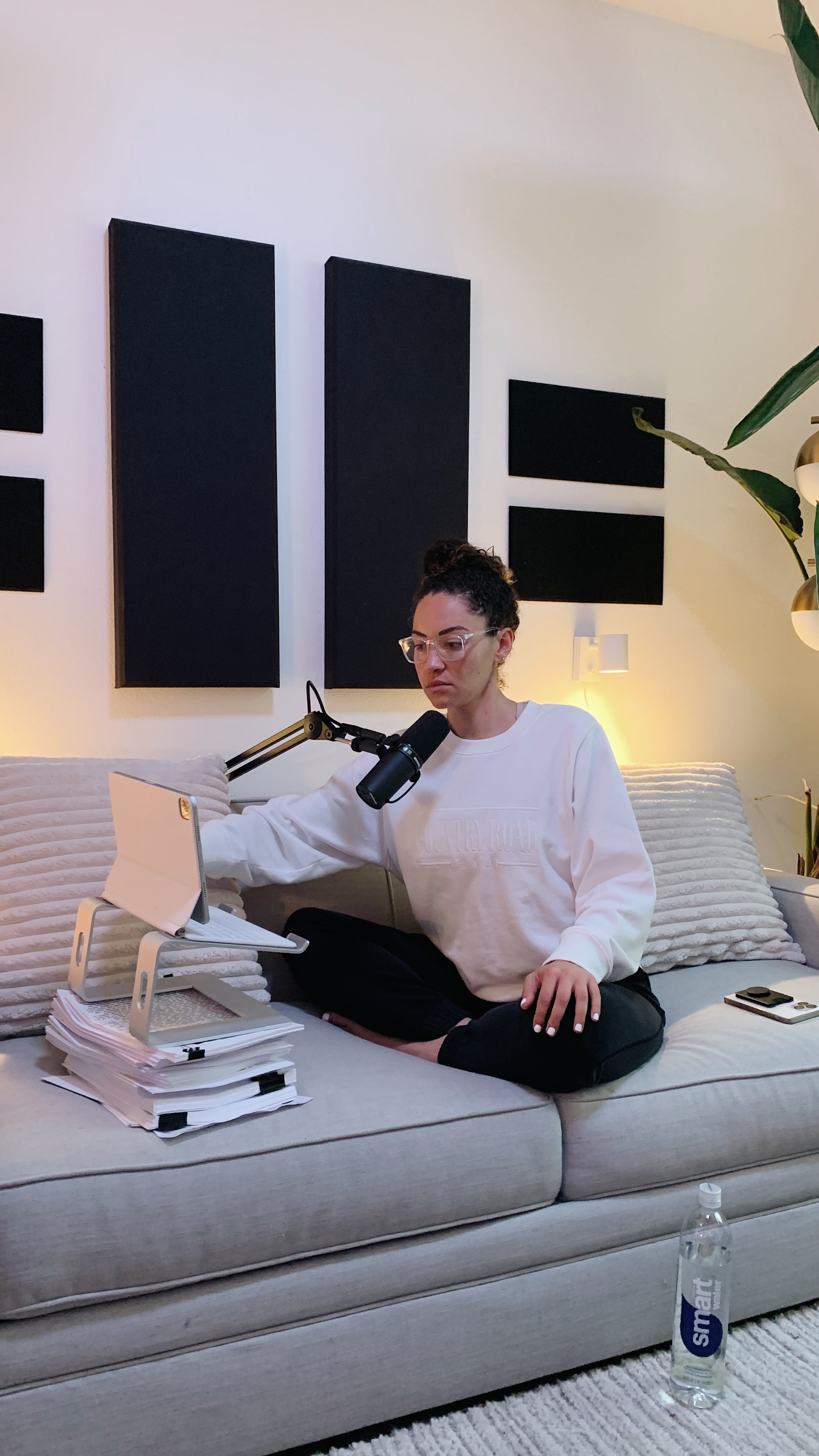
Madison McGhee recording her debut podcast, Ice Cold Case, in her Los Angeles apartment

=== Unscripted television ===
McGhee got her start as a Production Assistant for Monumental Sports Network working with major sports teams in Washington, DC: the Wizards, Mystics, and Capitals. Eventually she made her own feature-length documentary in 2016 about gap years between high school and college and college and professional careers. It premiered in her hometown of Charleston, West Virginia.

Before launching Ice Cold Case, McGhee was already producing for major networks. She has worked on unscripted projects for Warner Brothers Discovery, Food Network, Hulu, Snapchat, and Paramount. McGhee was selected as one of four producers to participate in Warner Brother Discovery's Access Program.

McGhee is still working on unscripted projects and now is developing her own shows and series. McGhee is represented by Creative Artists Agency. She is a member of the Producers Guild of America and the Screen Actors Guild - American Federation of Television and Radio Artists.

== Personal life ==
McGhee is from West Virginia but currently resides in Los Angeles, California. She splits her time between the United States and Australia. McGhee is unmarried with no children. She has a half-sister, Alyssa McGhee, who she was reconnected with after starting her investigation into their dad's murder.
