= Kennesaw, Georgia =

Kennesaw
- City
- City of Kennesaw
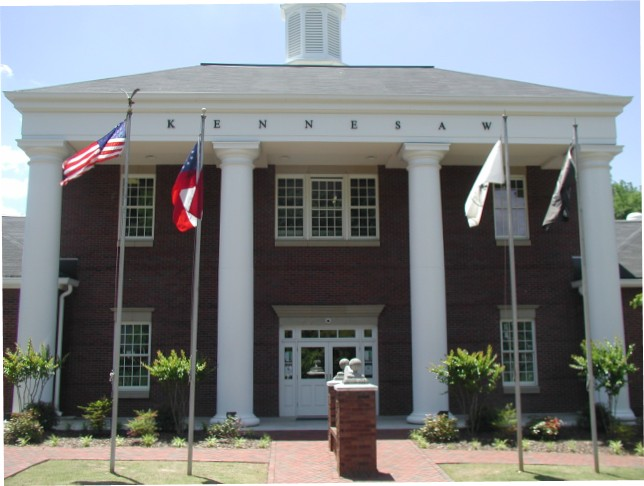
- Kennesaw City Hall

- Flag Seal Logo
- Interactive map of Kennesaw
- Coordinates: 34°1′24″N 84°36′55″W
- Country: United States
- State: Georgia
- County: Cobb
- Incorporated: September 21, 1887

Government
  - Mayor: Derek Easterling (R)

Area
  - Total: 9.82 sq mi (25.43 km^{2})
  - Land: 9.71 sq mi (25.16 km^{2})
  - Water: 0.10 sq mi (0.26 km^{2})
- Elevation: 1,089 ft (332 m)

Population (2020)
  - Total: 33,036
  - Density: 3,400.3/sq mi (1,312.88/km^{2})
- Time zone: UTC−5 (EST)
  - Summer (DST): UTC−4 (EDT)
- ZIP Codes: 30144 and 30152
- Area codes: 770; 678, 470, and 943
- FIPS code: 13-43192
- GNIS feature ID: 0316387
- Website: kennesaw-ga.gov

Kennesaw is a suburban city northwest of Atlanta in Cobb County, Georgia, United States, located within the greater Atlanta metropolitan area. Known from its original settlement in the 1830s until 1887 as Big Shanty, it became Kennesaw under an 1887 charter. According to the 2020 census, Kennesaw had a population of 33,036, a 10.9% increase in population over the preceding decade. Kennesaw has an important place in railroad history. During the Civil War, Kennesaw was the staging ground for the Great Locomotive Chase on April 12, 1862. Kennesaw is home to Kennesaw State University, an R2 research institution and the third-largest public university in the state of Georgia.

== Etymology ==
The name "Kennesaw" is derived from the Cherokee word Ganisahv (Cherokee spelling: ᎦᏂᏌᎲ), meaning 'cemetery' or 'burial ground'.

== History ==
As the Western and Atlantic Railroad was being built in the late 1830s, shanty towns arose to house the workers. These were near a big spring. A grade up from the Etowah River became known as "the big grade to the shanties", then "Big Shanty Grade", and finally "Big Shanty". It was officially incorporated as the city of Kennesaw in 1887.

=== Civil War ===
Camp MacDonald, a training camp, was located there from 1861 to 1863.

During the Civil War, Big Shanty was the site of major fighting in the Battle of Kennesaw Mountain, part of the larger Atlanta campaign. Kennesaw Mountain National Battlefield Park, located southeast of the city limits, now contains many of these historic areas. Much of the surrounding land has been developed, and many of the buried artifacts have been searched for and taken by people with metal detectors. Some artifacts of the Civil War are still on display in the visitor center of Kennesaw Mountain.

=== Later history ===
L. C. Chalker purchased a 1.25-acre (0.51 ha) tract of land adjacent to the Kennesaw Cemetery from J.W. Ellis in 1934, which was sold for burial purposes. Chalker purchased another 1 acre (0.40 ha) adjacent to the first parcel in 1948, which was also to be used for a cemetery. The Chalker family managed these portions of the cemetery until they were sold to the City of Kennesaw in the mid-1950s. The earliest known burial is the infant Lucius B. Summers, who was interred in 1863. Other grave markers date as far back as the 1860s to the 1890s. Civil War veterans are buried here. The Kennesaw Cemetery is still in use.

In March 2004, First Lady Laura Bush designated Kennesaw a Preserve America Community.

== Geography ==
Kennesaw is located in northwestern Cobb County, bordered by the city of Acworth to the northwest. Kennesaw Mountain is located southeast of the city limits in the battlefield park. Its summit is the highest point in the Atlanta metro area, at an elevation of 1,808 feet (551 m) above sea level. The city was renamed for the mountain.

U.S. Route 41 and State Route 3 pass through the city as Cobb Parkway, leading southeast 7 miles (11 km) to Marietta and northwest 17 miles (27 km) to Cartersville. Interstate 75 passes just northeast of the city limits, with access from exits 269, 271, and 273. Via I-75, downtown Atlanta is 27 miles (43 km) to the southeast, and Chattanooga, Tennessee, is 94 miles (151 km) northwest.

The iconic peaks of Kennesaw Mountain are visible from the bridge over Interstate 75 that crosses over the city limits of Kennesaw.

According to the United States Census Bureau, Kennesaw has a total area of 9.5 square miles (24.7 km^{2}), of which 9.4 square miles (24.4 km^{2}) is land and 0.12 square miles (0.3 km^{2}), or 1.08%, is water.

=== Climate ===
Kennesaw has a humid subtropical climate (Köppen climate classification: Cfa). On November 22, 1992, an F-4 tornado caused 34 injuries.

Climate data for Kennesaw, Georgia
Month	Jan	Feb	Mar	Apr	May	Jun	Jul	Aug	Sep	Oct	Nov	Dec	Year
Record high °F (°C)	80 (27)	81 (27)	89 (32)	93 (34)	96 (36)	101 (38)	104 (40)	104 (40)	99 (37)	92 (33)	86 (30)	80 (27)	104 (40)
Mean daily maximum °F (°C)	52 (11)	56 (13)	64 (18)	73 (23)	80 (27)	87 (31)	89 (32)	88 (31)	83 (28)	73 (23)	64 (18)	54 (12)	72 (22)
Mean daily minimum °F (°C)	30 (−1)	33 (1)	39 (4)	46 (8)	55 (13)	64 (18)	68 (20)	67 (19)	60 (16)	48 (9)	39 (4)	32 (0)	48 (9)
Record low °F (°C)	−12 (−24)	−2 (−19)	7 (−14)	21 (−6)	32 (0)	40 (4)	50 (10)	48 (9)	30 (−1)	22 (−6)	9 (−13)	−4 (−20)	−12 (−24)
Average precipitation inches (mm)	4.86 (123)	5.36 (136)	5.07 (129)	3.93 (100)	4.12 (105)	4.07 (103)	5.10 (130)	4.35 (110)	4.10 (104)	3.42 (87)	4.30 (109)	4.49 (114)	54.63 (1,388)

== Demographics ==
Historical population
Census	Pop.	Note	%±
1880	244		—
1890	168		−31.1%
1900	320		90.5%
1910	573		79.1%
1920	467		−18.5%
1930	426		−8.8%
1940	436		2.3%
1950	564		29.4%
1960	1,507		167.2%
1970	3,548		135.4%
1980	5,095		43.6%
1990	8,936		75.4%
2000	21,675		142.6%
2010	29,783		37.4%
2020	33,036		10.9%
2025 (est.)	37,970	▲	14.9%
U.S. Decennial Census; 1850-1870 1870-1880; 1890-1910 1920-1930; 1940 1950 1960; 1970 1980 1990; 2000 2010; 2025

=== 2020 census ===
As of the 2020 census, Kennesaw had a population of 33,036. The median age was 33.9 years. 20.6% of residents were under the age of 18 and 11.3% of residents were 65 years of age or older. For every 100 females there were 86.9 males, and for every 100 females age 18 and over there were 84.1 males age 18 and over.

There were 12,557 households, including 8,250 families; 32.3% had children under the age of 18 living in them. Of all households, 40.8% were married-couple households, 18.4% were households with a male householder and no spouse or partner present, and 34.6% were households with a female householder and no spouse or partner present. About 27.5% of all households were made up of individuals and 9.0% had someone living alone who was 65 years of age or older.

There were 13,270 housing units, of which 5.4% were vacant. The homeowner vacancy rate was 1.2% and the rental vacancy rate was 7.9%.

100.0% of residents lived in urban areas, while 0.0% lived in rural areas.

Kennesaw racial composition
Race	Num.	Perc.
White	17,982	54.4%
Black or African American	8,031	24.3%
American Indian and Alaska Native	144	0.4%
Asian	1,637	5.0%
Native Hawaiian and Other Pacific Islander	19	0.1%
Some other race	1,800	5.4%
Two or more races	3,423	10.4%
Hispanic or Latino (of any race)	4,257	12.9%

=== 2010 census ===
As of the census of 2010, there were 29,783 people, 11,413 households, and 7,375 families residing in the city. There were 12,328 housing units at an average density of 1,027.3 per square mile (396.6/km^{2}). The racial makeup of the city was 58.9% White, 22.3% Black, 10.8% Hispanic or Latino of any race, 5.3% Asian, 0.4% Native American, 0.02% Pacific Islander (U.S. Census), 4.7% of other races, and 3.0% non-Hispanic mixed of two or more races.

There were 11,413 households, out of which 38.1% had children under the age of 18 living with them, 45.0% were married couples living together, 15.2% had a female householder with no husband present, and 35.4% were non-families. Of all households, 26.8% were made up of individuals, and 6.4% had someone living alone who was 65 years of age or older. The average household size was 2.59 and the average family size was 3.18.

In the city, the population was spread out, with 27.0% under the age of 18, 10.6% from 18 to 24, 33.2% from 25 to 44, 21.8% from 45 to 64, and 7.3% who were 65 years of age or older. The median age was 32 years. For every 100 females, there were 95.6 males. For every 100 females age 18 and over, there were 89.7 males.

== Economy ==
=== Personal income ===
The median income for a household in the city was $61,355 and the median income for a family was $75,465. Males had a median income of $46,953, versus $42,809 for females. The per capita income for the city was $27,165. About 8.2% of families and 11.1% of the population were below the poverty line, including 13.1% of those under age 18 and 13.3% of those age 65 or over.

=== Tourism ===
Several festivals are held annually. Every April the annual Big Shanty Festival displays over 200 arts and crafts booths along with 20 food booths downtown featuring several local businesses and entrepreneurs. Over 60,000 people from around North Georgia attend the festival. The festival begins with a parade through downtown.

== Government ==
The city hall is located downtown, just off Main Street (old U.S. 41 and State Route 3, later State Route 293). It contains the offices of mayor and city council, a basement jail, a municipal 9-1-1 call center and other offices. It is the public-safety answering point for the city of Kennesaw and the neighboring city of Acworth, and dispatches the separate police departments of both cities. Calls for fire services are relayed to and dispatched from Cobb County's 911 center, and serviced by the Cobb County Fire Department, as neither city has its own fire department.

=== Wireless Internet in city parks ===
In 2008, the city of Kennesaw awarded a bid to Digitel Wireless for the implementation of city wireless Internet. In March 2008, the city of Kennesaw announced the grand opening of four new wireless areas: Swift-Cantrell Park and Adams Park, and the train depot area across from the Southern Museum of Civil War and Locomotive History. The city has also provided Wi-Fi in the Ben Robertson Community Center.

=== Crime statistics ===
In 2001, violent crime rates were about 60% below national and state rates. Property crime rates were from 46 to 56% below national and state rates. From 1999 to 2011, Kennesaw crime statistics reported that both property and violent crimes had decreased, though from 2003 to 2008 the trend in both violent and property crime rates slightly increased. The increase in crime rate overall is attributed to the population growth rate of 37.41%. The population growth rate is much higher than the state average rate of 18.34% and is much higher than the national average rate of 9.71%.

=== County services ===
The Cobb County Public Library System operates a Kennesaw branch library. The Cobb County Police Department serves unincorporated areas, including the Town Center Area Community Improvement District and Kennesaw State University (in addition to KSU's own police).

== Gun law ==
Kennesaw is noted for its unique firearms legislation, passed in response to a handgun ban in Morton Grove, Illinois. In 1982 the city passed an ordinance [Sec 34-21]:

(a) In order to provide for the emergency management of the city, and further in order to provide for and protect the safety, security and general welfare of the city and its inhabitants, every head of household residing in the city limits is required to maintain a firearm, together with ammunition therefore.

(b) Exempt from the effect of this section are those heads of households who suffer a physical or mental disability which would prohibit them from using such a firearm. Further exempt from the effect of this section are those heads of households who are paupers or who conscientiously oppose maintaining firearms as a result of beliefs or religious doctrine, or persons convicted of a felony.

A similar law was passed in 2000 in the city of Virgin, Utah, making it the second city in the United States to require residents to own guns. Nelson, Georgia; Nucla, Colorado; and Gun Barrel City, Texas, also followed suit.

== Local attractions ==
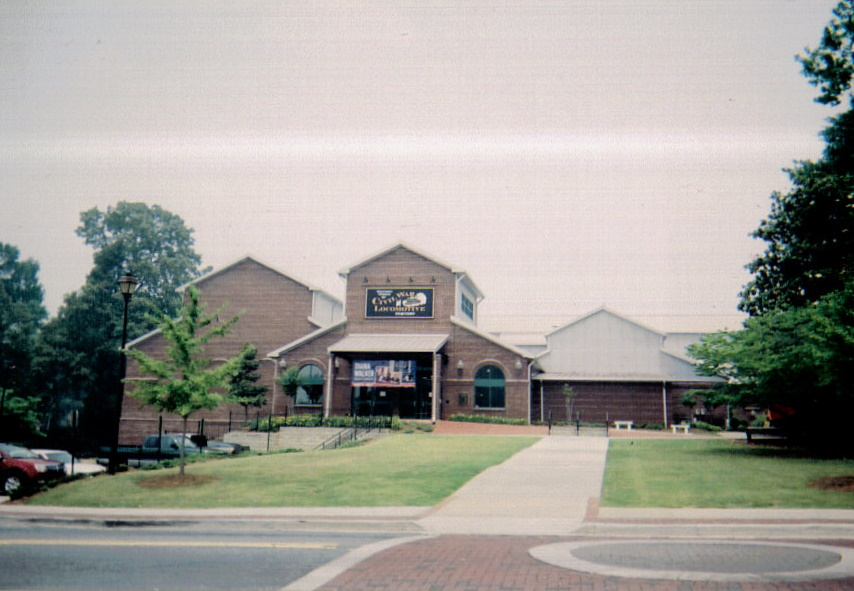
Southern Museum of Civil War and Locomotive History

- Southern Museum of Civil War and Locomotive History
- Kennesaw Mountain National Battlefield Park consists of around 18 miles (29 km) of nature trails and historic Civil War battle sites.
- The Kennesaw State University Bentley Rare Book Room and Archives

== Education ==
Public schools are operated by the Cobb County School District.

Elementary schools include Big Shanty Intermediate, Bullard, Chalker, Hayes, Kennesaw, and Lewis.

Middle schools include Awtrey, Lost Mountain, McClure, Palmer, and Pine Mountain.

High schools include Harrison High School, Kennesaw Mountain, North Cobb, and Kennesaw Charter Science & Math Academy.

Private schools include Sunbrook Academy at Legacy Park, Sunbrook Academy at Stilesboro, and Mount Paran Christian School.

Kennesaw State University is located near the city and is part of the University System of Georgia.

== Sports ==
In 2016, the Atlanta Blaze of Major League Lacrosse spent their first year of play as an expansion franchise with home games at Fifth Third Bank Stadium on the campus of Kennesaw State University. The team relocated in 2019.

== Notable people ==
- Darvin Adams, Canadian football player
- Caroline Cossey, English model
- Jesse James Dupree, lead singer of rock band Jackyl
- Yan Kaminsky, NHL left winger
- Ron Lester, actor
- Justin Fields, National Football League quarterback playing for the Kansas City Chiefs
- Suzanne Lambert, internet personality and comedian
- Payne Lindsey, documentary filmmaker and podcast host of Up and Vanished and Atlanta Monster
- Scott F. McAfee, judge on the Fulton County Superior Court and Georgia Inspector General from 2021 to 2023
- Sean O'Pry, model
- Mathew Pitsch, member of the Arkansas House of Representatives from Fort Smith from 2015 to 2019; former resident of Kennesaw
- Dansby Swanson, infielder for the Chicago Cubs
- Lucas Till, actor
- Brian Voss, professional ten-pin bowler on the PBA Toury
- Kenzie Annis, reality television personality and contestant on Love Island USA season 8
