= Western Colorado University =

Public university in Gunnison, Colorado, US

- Former names: Colorado State Normal School (1901–1923); Western State College of Colorado (1923–2012); Western State Colorado University (2012–2018)
- Motto: Potestas ad Ministrandum
- Motto in English: "The Power to Serve"
- Type: Public university
- Established: 1901; 125 years ago
- President: Brad Baca
- Faculty: 179 (fall 2024)
- Students: 3,568 (fall 2024)
- Undergraduates: 3,148 (fall 2024)
- Postgraduates: 420 (fall 2024)
- Location: Gunnison, Colorado, U.S. 38.549°N 106.920°W
- Campus: Rural, 350 acres (140 ha)
- Colors: Crimson and slate
- Nickname: Mountaineers
- Sporting affiliations: NCAA Division II – Rocky Mountain
- Website: western.edu

Western Colorado University (Western or WCU) is a public university in Gunnison, Colorado, United States. It enrolls approximately 3,000 undergraduate students and 450 graduate students, with about 28 percent coming from out of state. Western offers more than 110 undergraduate areas of study and 8 graduate programs, many of which are available through accelerated degree pathways.

== History ==
Western was established in 1901 and opened for classes in 1911 as the Colorado State Normal School, the first college on the Western Slope. This initial focus as a preparatory college for teachers resulted in a commitment to teacher preparation programs that continues to this day. In 1923 the college's name was changed to Western State College of Colorado in recognition of its expanding programs in the liberal arts at both undergraduate and graduate levels. The college continued to grow, particularly after World War II when returning veterans attended on the GI Bill, and academic and co-curricular programs capitalizing on the college's unique mountain setting were continually added. In 2012, the institution was renamed Western State Colorado University. In September 2018, the institution changed its name to Western Colorado University.

== Academics ==
Undergraduate demographics as of Fall 2023
Race and ethnicity	Total
White	72%
Hispanic	13%
Two or more races	4%
Unknown	4%
Black	3%
American Indian/Alaska Native	1%
Asian	1%
International student	1%
Economic diversity
Low-income (Note: The percentage of students who received an income-based federal Pell grant intended for low-income students.)	26%
Affluent (Note: The percentage of students who are a part of the American middle class at the bare minimum.)	74%

Western offers more than 110 areas of study for undergraduates, with classes averaging 17 students. It also offers 8 graduate programs and 10 graduate certificates, all available in hybrid online and in-person formats. Popular majors include Business Administration, Biology, Exercise & Sport Science, Environment & Sustainability, Recreation & Outdoor Education and Psychology. Western also offers many unique programs, including Petroleum Geology, Energy Management and High Altitude Exercise Physiology.

=== Rankings and recognition ===
- U.S. News & World Report ranked Western in three categories for 2020: Regional Universities West, Top Performers in Social Mobility, and regional Top Public Schools.
- Forbes designated Western Colorado University as one of the top 100 institutions in the West in 2017. Western has also appeared on Forbes lists in 2019, 2018, 2016, 2015 and 2014.
- Elevation Outdoors magazine named Western the "Top Adventure School in the West" for the third time in 2017.

=== Faculty ===
Of Western's 171 faculty members, 75% are full-time. The majority of faculty at Western also carry a terminal degree.

== Campus ==
=== University Center ===
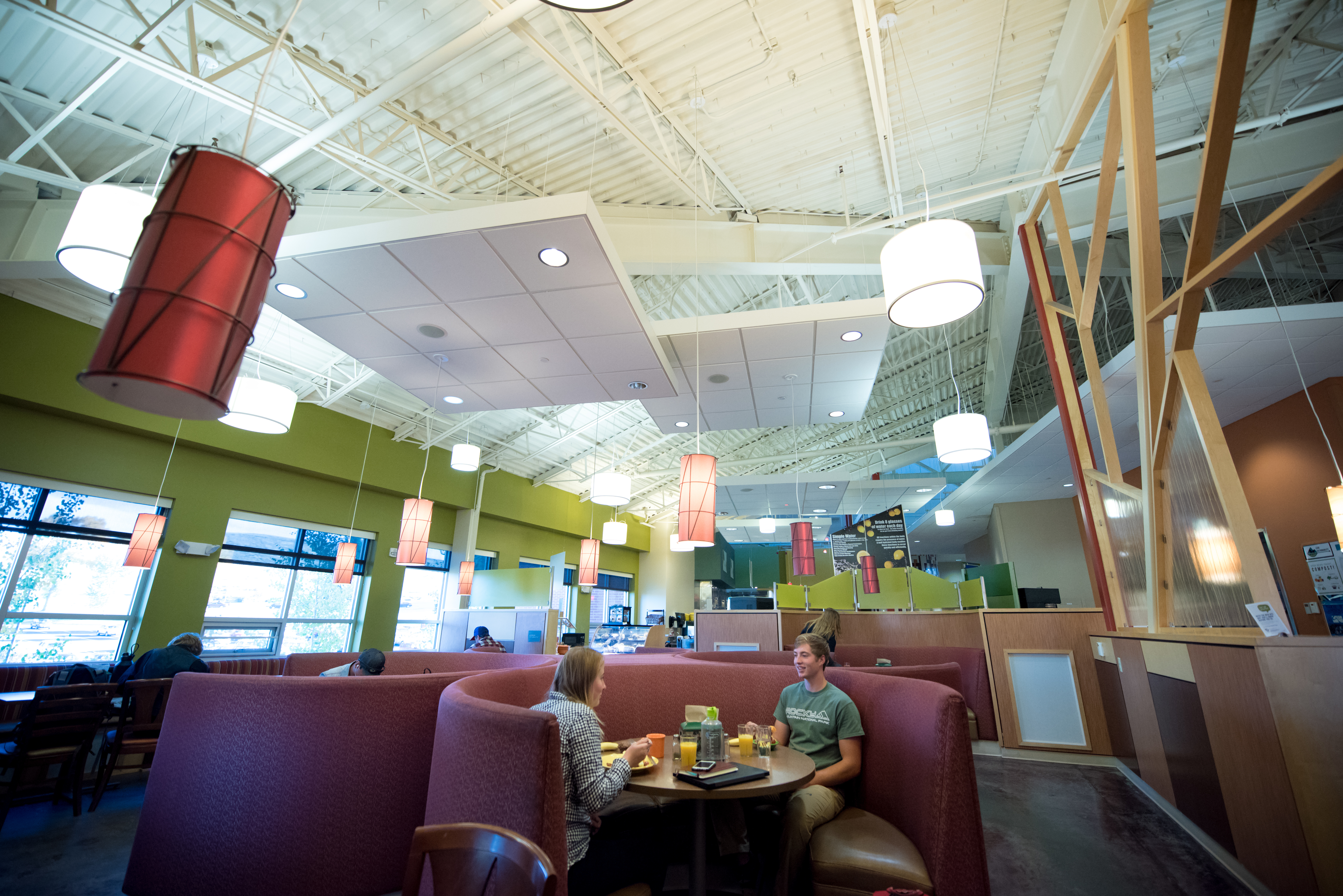
Rare Air Café

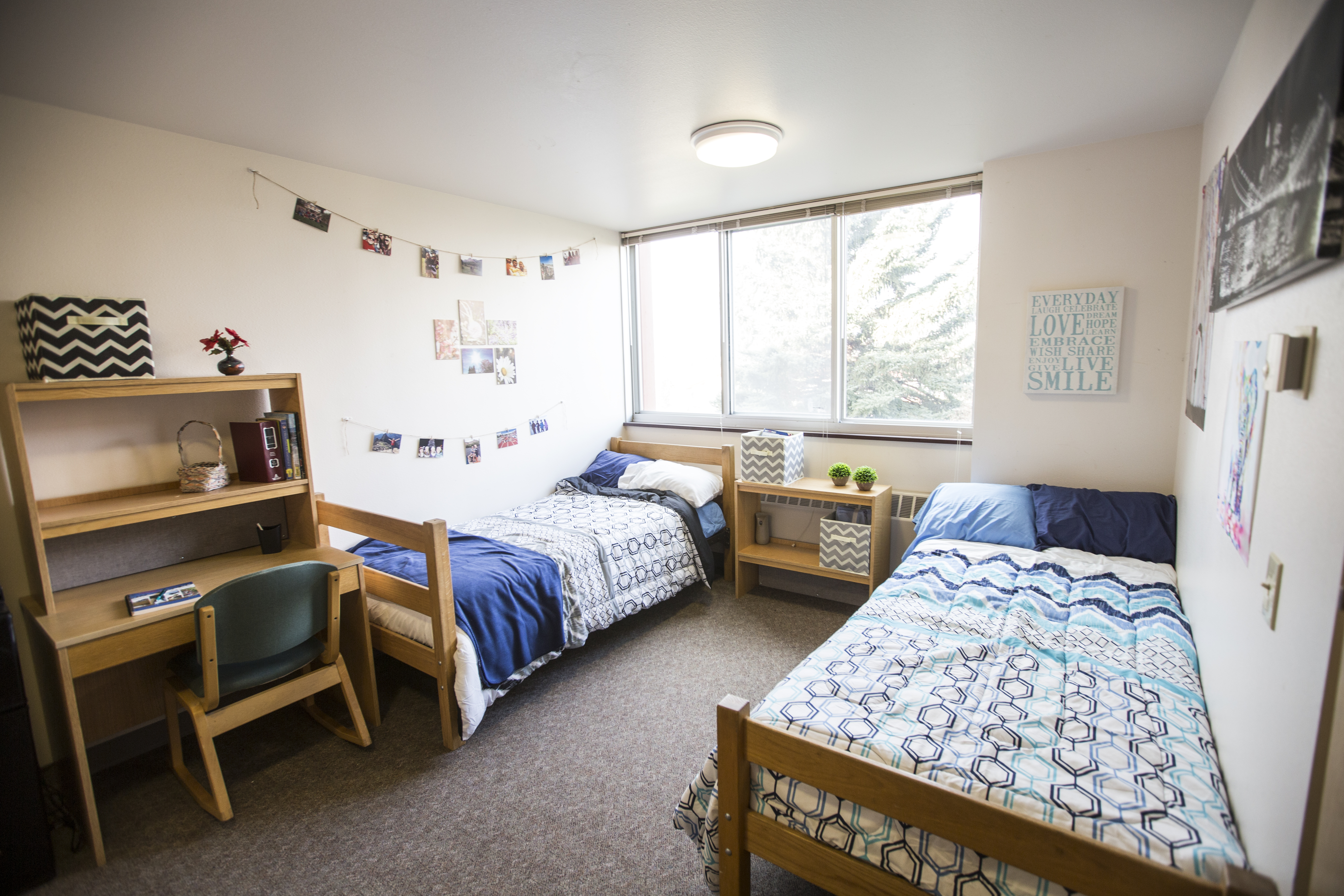
Standard freshman dorm room

The University Center (UC) serves as a central hub for student life at Western Colorado University. The facility provides spaces and services that support student engagement, campus activities, and community events.

The University Center houses dining options including Rare Air Café and Mad Jack’s Café, as well as a movie theater, meeting rooms, and event spaces. It is also home to several student support and involvement offices, such as LEAD & Orientation, the Multicultural Center, and Residence Life, among others.

=== Residence halls ===
Western has 5 on-campus residence halls. Two have traditional, two-person rooms intended for first-year students which are the Escalante Complex and Ute Hall. For returning students, the Mears Complex offers suite style living. Then the Chipeta and Pinnacles apartments are designed for older students and returning undergraduates. All students are required to live on campus for their first two years.

=== Borick Business Building ===
The Borick Business Building is home to the School of Business, which encompasses the Business Administration, Accounting and Economics programs in addition to the nation's first Outdoor Industry MBA.

=== Taylor Hall ===
Taylor Hall was the first building on Western's campus. It is LEED-certified and houses Western's administrative offices as well as the Communication Arts, Languages & Literature Department, Welcome Center and WSB radio station.

=== Hurst Quad ===
The Hurst Quad comprises Kelley, Hurst and Quigley Halls. Kelley Hall houses the Behavioral & Social Sciences and Environment & Sustainability departments. Hurst Hall houses the Natural & Environmental Sciences and Mathematics & Computer Science departments. Quigley Hall, which received significant renovations in 2016, is the center for the Art and Music departments.

=== Rady School of Computer Science & Engineering building ===
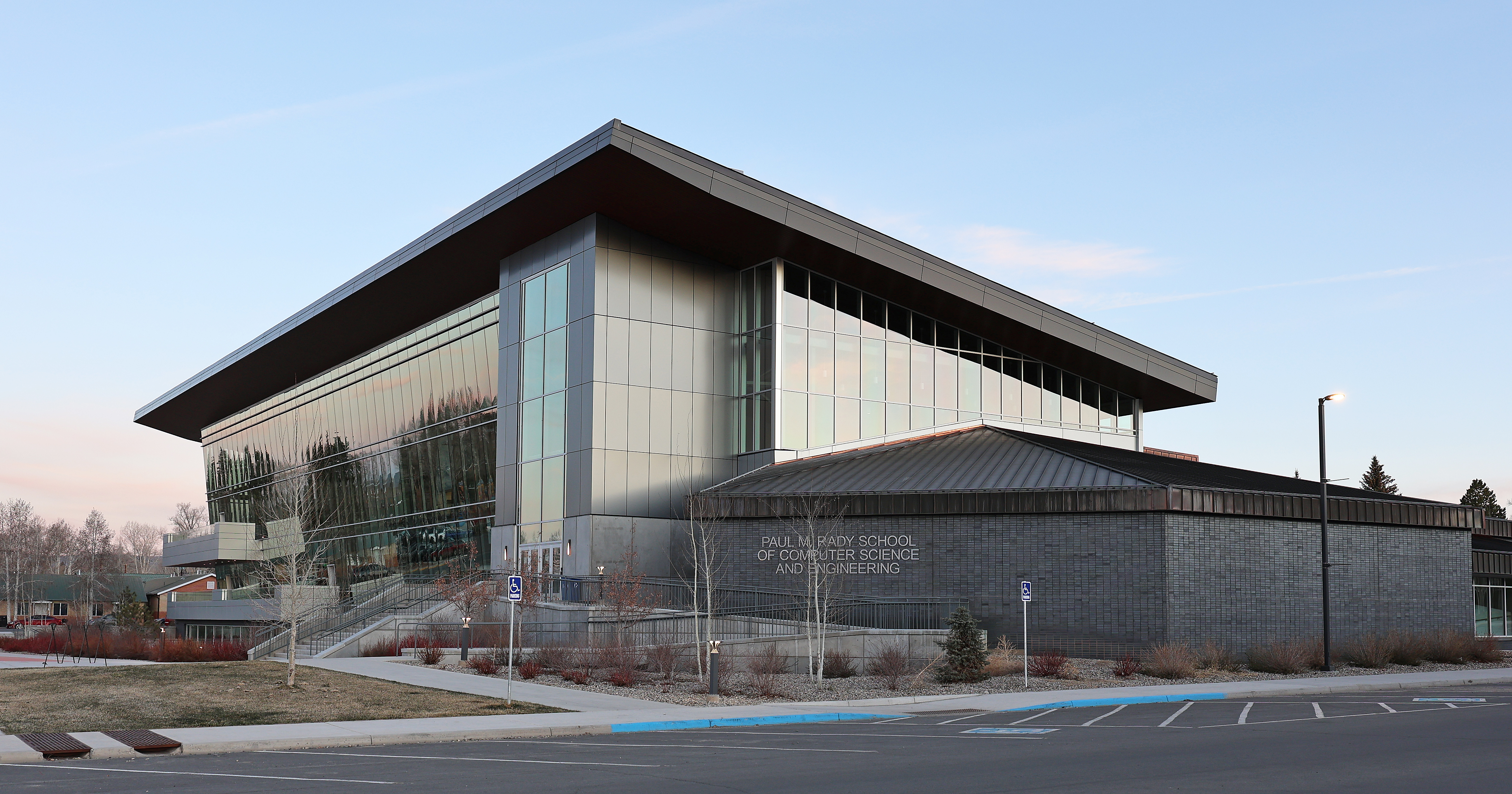
Rady School of Computer Science & Engineering

Opened in 2021, the Rady School of Computer Science & Engineering building is a 75,000-square-foot (7,000-square-meter) building that houses Western's Engineering Partnership Program, a program that operates in partnership with the University of Colorado Boulder. The steel and glass building's south side overlooks a large quad and symbolizes a positive future for the university.

=== Leslie J. Savage Library ===
The Leslie J. Savage Library provides access to more than 250,000 printed volumes, 3,500 films, and approximately 80,000 electronic records from around the world. Its Special Collections and Archives house university records, materials related to Colorado history, rare books, and donated papers of regional and institutional significance. The library also includes a 24-hour PC and Mac computer lab, individual and group study spaces, and larger rooms for meetings and academic activities. In addition, the library offers a complimentary bike rental program for students.

The Leslie J. Savage Library's West Wing was designed by Temple Buell.

=== Mountaineer Bowl ===
The Mountaineer Bowl is a collegiate athletic stadium located at an elevation of 7,723 feet, making it one of the highest-elevation college stadiums in the world. The facility hosts football games as well as track and field events, and it also serves as a central campus venue for major academic milestones, including First Year Orientation and Commencement ceremonies.

=== Mountaineer Field House and Paul Wright Gym ===
The Mountaineer Field House is a multi-purpose athletic and recreation facility. The 65,000-square-foot complex opened in March 2014 and serves both students and university athletic programs. It features a 200-meter, six-lane indoor track, multiple courts for basketball, volleyball, and other sports, and dedicated areas for strength and conditioning. The facility also includes a 43.5-foot climbing wall, fitness and group exercise rooms, and additional training spaces for a variety of recreational and competitive activities. Mountaineer Field House supports student fitness, campus recreation, and athletic training needs.

The Paul Wright Gym is attached to the Mountaineer Field House. At the north end of campus, this 1951 building is the world's highest collegiate gym. It seats 1,800 and various renovations have added Western's indoor pool, a wrestling room, locker rooms, the Hall of Fame trophy room and classrooms for Western's Recreation & Outdoor Education and Exercise & Sport Science departments. It's named for Paul W. Wright, who spent 38 years as a professor, coach and administrator at Western, as well serving as a judge and mayor of Gunnison.

== Athletics ==
=== NCAA ===
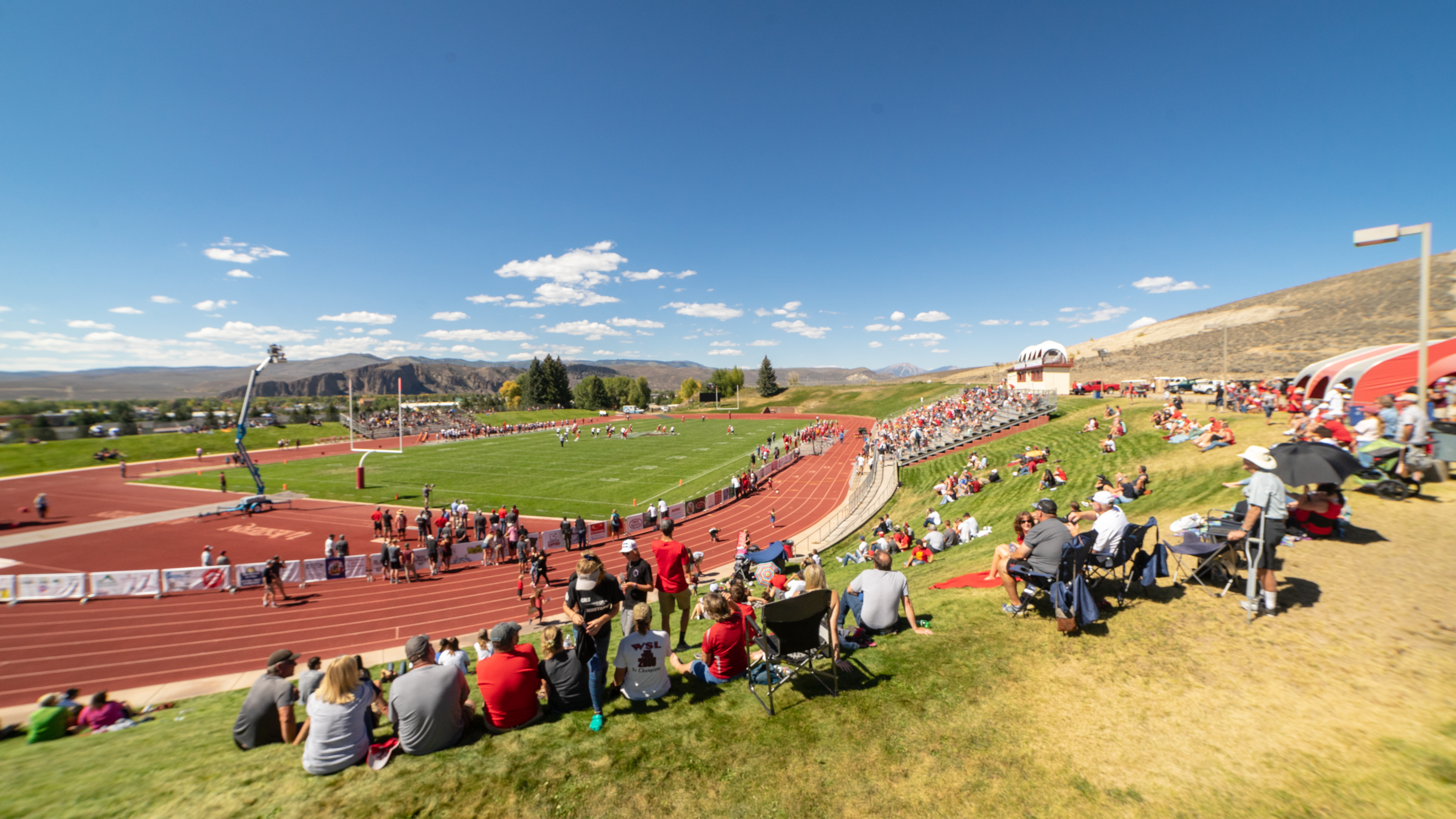
Mountaineer Bowl (elevation 7,769 ft.)

The Western Colorado University Mountaineers compete in the Rocky Mountain Athletic Conference (RMAC) at the NCAA Division II level. Mountaineer teams compete in 12 sports: football, women's volleyball, men's and women's cross country, men's and women's track & field (indoor and outdoor), women's soccer, men's and women's basketball, men's wrestling, women's wrestling (2026/2027 will be the inaugural season), and women's swimming & diving. Facilities include Mountaineer Bowl (elevation 7,771 feet (2,369 m)) and Paul Wright Gym (elevation 7,723 feet (2,354 m)).

The Mountaineers have won 93 RMAC team titles and 15 team National Championships. Individually, Western has produced 990 All-Americans and 30 Academic All-American honors.

In 2016–17, Alicja Konieczek became the first Mountaineer to win four national track and field titles. She has since won four more national titles—the most by any female in Western's history.

=== Mountain Sports ===
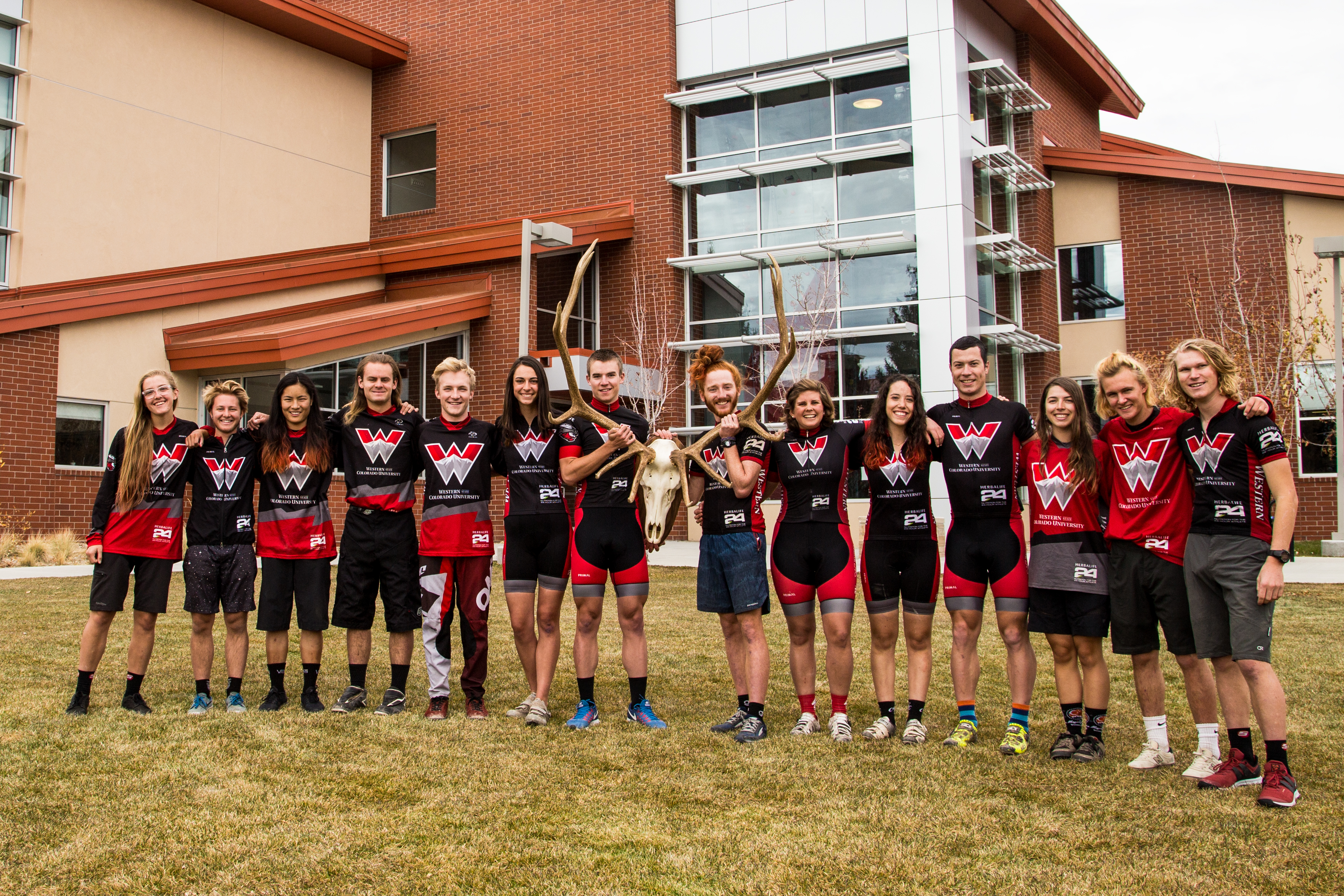
The Mountain Bike Team after winning the 2017 DII Varsity National Title

Western Mountain Sports is an athletic program revolving around outdoor, mountain-based athletics. The program includes disciplines in freeride (big mountain) skiing and snowboarding, freestyle skiing and snowboarding, alpine ski racing, Nordic ski racing, randonnée (SkiMo) racing, mountain biking, rock climbing, road cycling and trail running. There is also a media program, where students travel with the teams and document the trips and events through a variety of visual and written media.

The program differs from NCAA athletics in that Mountain Sports athletes don't necessarily compete in intercollegiate competition and may carry sponsorships and accept prize money. While technically a club sport program, Mountain Sports distinguishes from club and intramural sports due to the abundance of funding for coaching, travel, equipment and overall popularity.

Three Freeride athletes have qualified for the Freeride World Tour.

=== Club and intramural sports ===
Western's Club sports include: men's baseball, men's boxing, women's boxing, men's ice hockey, women's ice hockey, men's lacrosse, men's rugby, women's rugby, men's soccer, women's soccer and coed swimming.

Western's intramural sports are all coed and include: slow-pitch softball, flag football, ultimate frisbee, kickball, bubble ball soccer, indoor soccer, floor hockey, pickleball, inner-tube water polo, dodgeball, volleyball, basketball, table tennis/billiards and Quidditch.

== Clubs and organizations ==
=== Wilderness Pursuits ===
Wilderness Pursuits, commonly referred to as simply “WP," provides Western students and visitors affordable gear rentals and opportunities for outdoor expeditions. WP hires students to guide and instruct courses, and puts on “Wilderness Based Orientation” before the start of each academic year. The most popular trips include whitewater rafting, kayaking, mountain biking, ice climbing, rock climbing and backpacking.

=== Mountain Rescue Team ===
The Western Mountain Rescue Team (WMRT) serves the Gunnison County region and is the only collegiate search-and-rescue team accredited by the Mountain Rescue Association (MRA). The team was first started in 1967 after a group of students banded together to search for a missing physics professor and has been MRA-certified since 1987.

=== Multicultural Center ===
The Multicultural Center celebrates the diversity of people in and around the Gunnison community and helps students develop culturally, personally and academically. The Multicultural Center advises five student organizations: Amigos, Asian Pacific Islanders Club, Black Student Alliance, Native America Student Council, and Polynesian Chant and Dance.

=== KWSB Radio ===
Western has one of the oldest collegiate radio stations in the state, student-operated KWSB 91.1 FM, which has been on the air since 1968.

=== Top o' the World Newspaper ===
The Top has been in print since 1921 and is entirely written and produced by Western students, with funding from student fees and advertising.

=== Organics Guild ===
Organics Guild is a student-led initiative that promotes sustainable food systems on campus and around Gunnison. The group maintains two gardens on campus. Students and community members can pick vegetables, which are often sold at the Gunnison Farmers Market.

=== Sources of Strength ===
Western's Office of Student Health and Wellness implemented the nationally recognized Sources of Strength program in 2018. The program's mission is to provide evidence-based prevention for suicide, violence, bullying and substance abuse by training, supporting, and empowering peer leaders and adults to impact the campus through the power of connection, hope, help and strength. Western is the first university in Colorado and only the eighth in the nation to implement Sources of Strength.

== Culture ==
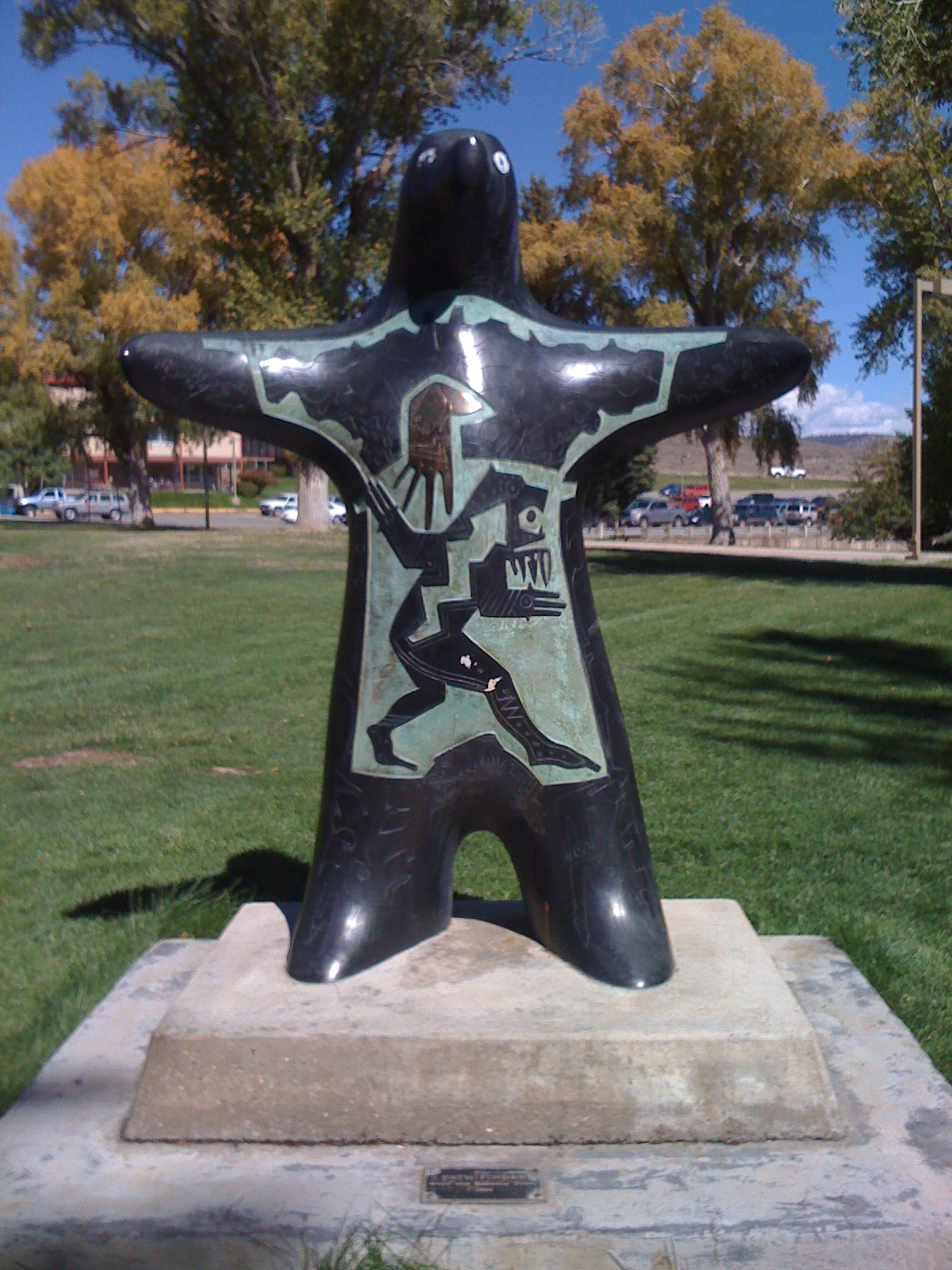
Pathfinder, a bronze grizzly bear by Gene and Rebecca Tobey

In 1994, the school commissioned Santa Fe sculptors Gene and Rebecca Tobey to create a new work for the campus. The result was Pathfinder, a six-foot-tall bronze grizzly bear, which students have a custom of hugging for good luck during exams. Two other Tobey works are displayed at Western—a bronze bull elk titled Wind River, which stands out by the skate park, and a small buffalo titled Wandering Star which is displayed inside Leslie J. Savage Library.

== Western Colorado Foundation ==
The Western Colorado University Foundation is a private nonprofit corporation founded in 1975. It is the primary depository of private gifts from alumni, friends, corporations and foundations used to advance the mission and goals of Western Colorado University. Each year, the Foundation gives more than $2 million to the university, with the greatest portion directed to scholarships.

== Notable alumni ==
- Robert E. Blackburn - Senior United States district judge of the United States District Court for the District of Colorado
- Harry Butler, William Henry "Harry" Butler AO CBE, Eminent naturalist and conservationist, media presenter In the Wild 1976–81, Australian of the Year 1979
- Shane Carwin - (environmental technology) wrestler; former mixed martial artist who won the UFC Interim Heavyweight Championship
- Barry Clifford - Underwater archaeological explorer
- Michael K. Davis - Chief justice of the Wyoming Supreme Court
- Elva Dryer - Long-distance runner
- Austin Ekeler - NFL running back for the Washington Commanders
- Jennifer Fielder - Montana State Senator
- Dan Gibbs - Executive Director of the Colorado Department of Natural Resources
- Michael O. Johnson - Former CEO of Herbalife
- Lauren Kleppin - Long-distance runner
- Ila Mae McAfee - Artist
- Rutherford George Montgomery - Children's book writer and Walt Disney Studios scriptwriter
- Seth Morrison - Big mountain skier
- Tyler Pennel - Long-distance runner
- Kristal Reisinger - former student, teacher, and missing person in nearby Crestone, and subject of the podcast Up and Vanished's second season
- Sam Seale - NFL player
- Barbara Szabo - High jump athlete
- Josh Thompson - Biathlete, Winter Olympian, silver medalist at the 1987 Biathlon World Championships
- Dave Wiens - Professional mountain biker
