= Richard Louis Hunter =

American forger & serial killer (born 1955)

- Born: 1955 (age 70–71); Atlanta, Georgia, U.S.
- Convictions: Murder (4 counts); Rape (4 counts); Burglary (4 counts); Forgery (1 count)
- Penalty: Life imprisonment

Details
- Victims: 4
- Span of crimes: March – April 1986
- Country: United States
- State: Georgia
- Date apprehended: April 20, 1986

Richard Louis Hunter (Note: Middle name is also spelled 'Lewis') (born 1955) is a convicted American serial killer and forger. A day laborer, Hunter raped and killed four elderly women in Atlanta between March and April 1986, robbing their apartments afterwards. He later pleaded guilty to the murders and numerous robberies, and was sentenced to life imprisonment.

== Murders ==
The first victim was 85-year-old Annie Rochelle Copeland, who lived alone in a small apartment in southwest Atlanta. She was found by a neighbor, a minister, on March 1, 1986, who became worried after knocking on the door and receiving no reply. She was found lying on her bed in the fetal position, covered with a bedspread and blanket, and her face covered by a pillow and her blue nightgown. The apartment had been turned upside down, with items from a pocketbook strewn about and a bloody pillowcase placed between her legs. The perpetrator had managed to enter by cutting the screen of a living room window and pulling out the windowpane. The killing scared other elderly residents living near Clark University, who took additional measures to protect themselves in case the perpetrator struck again.

Only a few days later, on March 6, 25-year-old Felton Clements went to check on his 61-year-old mother Aretha, who lived alone in northwest Atlanta, only to find her dead and her apartment ransacked. Mrs. Clements had been manually strangled and then wrapped up in her bedspread, nightgown disarranged, her head put against the foot of the bed and her right leg beneath her. Her plants had been overturned, her drawers emptied, and her 25-inch color TV set and pocketbook stolen. There were no suspects in this case either, as Aretha rarely left her home except when visiting her best friend or for treatment at Grady Memorial Hospital.

The situation repeated on March 11, with the discovery of the body of 62-year-old Dena Mae Mike, a blind woman who hadn't been seen in two days. Similarly to Copeland and Clements, she had either been smothered, and several objects had been placed on her head, including a sweater, a pillow, a plastic garment bag with clothing on hangers and a duffel bag. Like Copeland, her nightgown had been trampled with, and a bloody pillowcase was found between her legs. Her killer had apparently entered through a kitchen window. With Mike's death, law enforcement from Atlanta Homicide began to make connections between the recent murders: all of the victims had been elderly black women, living alone off social security benefits, within one general area, and all had had their apartments burgled and items stolen after death. The GBI was involved in the investigations, and residents of the area were queried about any suspicious individuals in the area.

For the four following weeks, the murders ceased before abruptly resuming with the killing of 65-year-old Grace Hill on April 9. She was found by her friends, partially naked on her living room floor in northwest Atlanta, suffocated to death and possibly sexually assaulted. The killer, who had entered through an unlocked back door, had put a newspaper over her chest, and a doll between her legs. With her death, the authorities officially announced to the media that they were investigating all four deaths as the work of a serial killer.

=== Community response and perpetrator profile ===
The murders caused a great stir in the city, including among politicians and community leaders, with then-Governor Joe Frank Harris offering a total of $8,000 reward for any information regarding the murders. Comparisons were also drawn to the Atlanta murders of 1979–1981, albeit most of those victims had been younger males. According to Dr. James Alan Fox, the killer was black, in his 30s, lived near the victims, and a sadist who might have developed a hatred for the elderly due to an abusive childhood.

== Arrest, trial and imprisonment ==
In mid-April, an anonymous tip was received by police about a certain felon who should be investigated for the series. On April 20, the authorities arrested that suspect, who was residing in his girlfriend's house with their four children, on a probation violation - a 31-year-old convicted forger named Richard Louis Hunter, who had lived in the neighborhood. Hunter was quickly ordered to undergo psychological tests at Grady Memorial Hospital, and was arraigned for court on May 8. On May 10, he was charged with the murder while sitting in the Atlanta city jail. Although officials deterred from saying how strong there was evidence against Hunter was, one anonymous source claimed that they had strong fingerprints matching those of the accused, who had already admitted to attempting to sell Copeland's TV set, but also claimed to have had an accomplice. Eventually, in order to avoid the death penalty, Hunter pleaded guilty to the murders, and received 8 life sentences, plus 80 years for the burglaries associated with the killings. According to District Attorney Lewis R. Slaton, he would have to serve at least 30 years before being eligible for parole.

== See also ==
- Atlanta murders of 1979–1981
- List of serial killers in the United States
