= Dixie Hills, Atlanta =

Neighborhood of Atlanta, Georgia

Coordinates: 33.759°N 84.452°W

Dixie Hills is a historic neighborhood of northwest Atlanta with a population of 1,756 (2010).

It is bordered:

- on the north by Joseph E. Boone Blvd., across which are Center Hill and Grove Park
- on the east by Whitaker Circle and Anderson Ave., across which are West Lake
- on the south by I-20 across which is Florida Heights; and Penelope Neighbors
- on the west by the Harvel Homes Community and Westhaven

== History ==
A historic West Atlanta Neighborhood since 1938. Real estate developer Heman E. Perry developed Hunter Hills and Dixie Hills with contractor Herman Glass.

In 1960, Donald "Doc" Miller opened Miller's Dixie Hills Pharmacy. In 1965 he moved his business to what is now called South Downtown and changed the name to Miller's Rexall Drugs, today a quirky landmark known for its selection of hoodoo supplies.

During the long hot summer of 1967, when more than 100 race riots broke out around the country, Dixie Hills joined the rebellion for three nights after Kwame Turé (then Stokely Carmichael) addressed a protest over a youngster’s shooting by a black policeman.

In 1967, Atlanta historian Franklin Garrett described Dixie Hills as a small area of "small, neat, middle-class homes" of African Americans; "near the edge lies a large, low-rent, privately owned apartment complex which curves around a small shopping center". There were no swimming pools or shade trees or entertainment facilities. After a riot in June 1967, the city dedicated resources to build a path to Anderson Park, a baseball diamond and shower stalls; and to repairing streets and improving health inspections.

== Government ==
Dixie Hills lies in NPU J.

== Parks ==
- Anderson Park

== Neighborhood Association ==
It has an active community with monthly neighborhood meetings and committee volunteers (a.k.a. Dixie Hills Community Civic Club). The official community website for the Dixie Hills neighborhood is www.DixieHillsAtlanta.com

== People ==
Atlanta Child Murders prime suspect Wayne Williams was born and raised in Dixie Hills. Many of the victims disappeared from the neighborhood.
