= Radio Rental =

Horror podcast by Tenderfoot TV

Publication
- Provider: Tenderfoot TV and Cadence13

Related
- Website: radiorentalusa.com

Radio Rental is a horror podcast produced by Tenderfoot TV and Cadence13. The show is created by Payne Lindsey and hosted by Rainn Wilson. A list of occasional guest hosts includes Josh Radnor, Tig Notaro, Rachel Dratch, Jeff Foxworthy, Chris Redd, and Brian Baumgartner.

== Background ==
The stories in the show are non-fiction. The podcast is a semi-scripted series. The podcast is produced by Tenderfoot TV. The podcast is created by Payne Lindsey. The second season of the show is hosted by Rainn Wilson. The name of the podcast comes from cockney rhyming slang for "mental". The show released seven episodes for season one, which ended in December 2019. Wilson plays an employee of a video rental store named Terry Carnation.
