= Who Killed Atlanta's Children? =

- dvd cover
- Written by: Charles Robert Carner
- Directed by: Charles Robert Carner
- Theme music composer: James Verboort
- Countries of origin: Germany; United States
- Original language: English

Original release
- Network: Showtime
- Release: July 16, 2000

Who Killed Atlanta's Children? (also known as Echo of Murder and Unanswered Questions) is a TV movie about the Atlanta child murders starring James Belushi and Gregory Hines. It was directed by Charles Robert Carner and first aired on Showtime on July 16, 2000. This movie projects a conspiracy theory about the murders: that they were committed by the Ku Klux Klan, who then framed Wayne Williams.

== Reception ==
The movie was critically reviewed in Time magazine by Richard Corliss, who said the director-writer "blithely shuffles fact and innuendo."

== Cast ==
- James Belushi - Pat Laughlin
- Gregory Hines - Ron Larson
- Sean McCann - Aubrey Melton
- Shawn Doyle - Royle McCullough
- Kenneth Welsh - William Kunstler
- Eugene Clark - Dave
- Jack Wallace - Phil Peters
- J. J. Johnston - Clark Hildebrandt
- Aidan Devine - Jack Johnson
- Lynda Gravatt - Mildred Glover
- Debra Sharkey - Sally Laughlin
- Bill Duke - Chirumenga Jeng
- Bill MacDonald - B.J. the informant
- Craig Eldridge - Robert Ingram, GBI
- Matthew Cooke - Lubie Geter
- Karen Glave - Camille Bell
- Karen Robinson - Lois Evans
- Quancetia Hamilton - Willie Mae Mathis
- Sean Bell - Daryl McCullough
- Michael Rhoades - Bobby McCullough
- Cle Bennett - Wayne Williams
- Sarah Lafleur - Spin Secretary
- Philip Akin - Police Spokesman
- Bill Lake - GBI Man
- Patrick Chilvers - FBI Agent
- Conrad Coates - Special Agent
