= Up and Vanished =

True crime podcast

- Genre: Investigative journalism; True crime
- Language: English

Cast and voices
- Hosted by: Payne Lindsey

Technical specifications
- Audio format: Podcast (via streaming or downloadable MP3)

Publication
- No. of seasons: 3
- No. of episodes: 37
- Original release: August 7, 2016 – 2018
- Provider: Cadence13
- Updates: Weekly

Related
- Website: upandvanished.com

Up and Vanished is an investigative documentary-style podcast hosted by Payne Lindsey. The series investigates missing persons cold cases by reviewing old leads, interviewing witnesses and townspeople, and on-site investigation. The show is produced by Tenderfoot TV. The first season premiered on August 7, 2016, and investigated the case of Tara Grinstead, a beauty queen and school teacher who disappeared in Ocilla, Georgia. Season 2 aired in August 2018 and focused on the disappearance of Kristal Reisinger in Crestone, Colorado. The podcast also prompted a television special on Oxygen that premiered on November 18, 2018. The success of Up and Vanished has led to the creation of many other podcasts from Payne Lindsey, such as Atlanta Monster and Radio Rental.

== History ==
In 2016, documentary filmmaker Payne Lindsey of Tenderfoot TV studios began researching the Tara Grinstead cold case as a possibility for a new film. Lindsey became aware of Tara Grinstead's case because of its reputation as the largest case file in Georgia state history, but he also soon discovered that his grandmother's friend was one of the last people to see Tara alive. Inspired by the popular NPR podcast Serial, Lindsey recorded his research in a podcast style format detailing the specifics of the case, as well as interviews with key witnesses. The podcast, Up and Vanished, premiered on Apple Podcasts and the show's website, upandvanished.com, on August 7, 2016. Soon after the podcast's release it made the top charts and began receiving attention and notoriety within the small Ocilla, Georgia community. The podcast is credited with reigniting the discussion on the case after it sat dormant for twelve years. In the statement by the Georgia Bureau of Investigation announcing the arrest of Ryan Alexander Duke in connection to the murder, the GBI's spokesperson thanked the media for keeping the public interested in the case.

In 2018, Up and Vanished began to publish a second season dedicated to the 2016 disappearance of Kristal Reisinger. A young mother, Kristal went missing in Crestone, Colorado, during a full moon drum circle. Crestone is considered a spiritual center for new age religion. While Saguache County Sheriff's Office opened a missing persons case, as time passed, the case had not publicly announced new leads. Developments in 2017 had led the investigators to believe foul play was involved in the likely death of Kristal Reisinger. In late September 2018, the Reisinger case was handed from Saguache County Sheriff's Office to the Colorado Bureau of Investigation. While season 2 of Up and Vanished went on an unannounced hiatus late 2019, host Payne Lindsey has stated that he had continued to investigate the case and had been documenting the whole time.

In 2021, Up and Vanished began a third season dedicated to the disappearance of Ashley Loring HeavyRunner.

== Episodes ==
=== Season 1 (2016–17) ===
No.	Title	Length (minutes:seconds)	Original release date
1	"Cold as Alaska"	23:46	August 7, 2016
Payne learns about this mysterious case and starts his investigation. Things don't go as planned but he might just have his first lucky break.
2	"White Rabbits"	26:02	August 21, 2016
We learn that everything isn't always what it seems in this case. New figures emerge, and the people of Ocilla are finally talking.
3	"The Alibi"	26:25	September 5, 2016
We talk to Anthony Vickers and learn about some new people in this case. Then, someone's alibi gets a thorough examination.
4	"Snapdragon Road"	26:43	September 26, 2016
The biggest lead yet takes us underneath a home in Ocilla. We learn more about this mysterious fire on Snapdragon Road.
5	"The Black Truck"	20:35	October 10, 2016
In this episode we explore an old lead from 2006 about a black truck seen in Tara's yard and on the surrounding street on the night that she disappeared.
6	"Suicide"	26:39	October 24, 2016
There's more than one suspicious person in this case, and it's time to explore them all. Plus a twist that could be a big break or another white rabbit.
7	"Phineas Gage"	30:19	November 21, 2016
We explore the man who committed suicide and the circumstances leading to his death. Plus the mysterious suicide note.
8	"In the Box"	25:27	December 5, 2016
We look a little deeper into the suicide theory and continue to search for new names in the box.
9	"The Glove"	26:54	December 19, 2016
A new person in Tara’s life is discovered and he tells us his story. After further investigation, we find some interesting information about that latex glove.
10	"George Harrison"	24:54	January 2, 2017
We dive deeper into the latex glove and a new witness of the black truck emerges. Plus, who is George Harrison?
11	""There's Our Guy""	34:41	January 16, 2017
Payne tells the whole story behind this mysterious "George Harrison" and we piece together clues bringing us closer to his true identity.
12	""I Love You Too""	56:09	January 30, 2017
We find out who George Harrison really is and we talk to several new people with some very important information in this case.
13	"Who Is Ryan Duke"	39:59	February 27, 2017
In the first ever press conference for Tara Grinstead, the GBI makes a very big announcement. Who is Ryan Duke?
14	"The Pecan Grove"	29:15	March 13, 2017
A new name surfaces as a second arrest is made. A Pecan Orchard becomes the focal point of the investigation.
15	"Older, Wiser Fool"	48:32	March 27, 2017
Payne takes a look inside Tara's house and visits Irwin County High School. Could a new break in the case be old news?
16	"Conspiracy"	48:28	April 10, 2017
Payne talks true crime podcasts with Crimetown creator/host Mark Smerling. On a trip to Ocilla, he also visits Marcus Harper's mother.
17	"The Deal"	41:16	April 24, 2017
Payne discusses Ryan Duke's state of mind as an indictment comes down, plus a potential deal is struck.
18	"Not Guilty"	35:16	May 8, 2017
Every story has an ending...
19	"Brooke's Story"	57:56	May 22, 2017
Bo Dukes's girlfriend finally tells story.
20	"Queensland"	39:16	June 5, 2017
The investigation continues as Payne Lindsey uncovers new details and circles back to old evidence.
21	"Statute of Limitations"	40:55	June 19, 2017
Payne Lindsey explores new evidence of the 2005 orchard search and Philip Holloway weighs in on the statute of limitations.
22	"The Gag Order"	30:46	July 3, 2017
Finally, some truth.
23	"Who Is Bo Dukes"	40:23	July 17, 2017
Exploring the details of Bo Dukes' mysterious conversation with a stranger.
24.1	"Black Out Part 1"	39:59	July 31, 2017
After 2 years investigating and bringing weekly updates on the disappearance of Tara Grinstead, Up and Vanished Season 1 is coming to a close. Payne Lindsey takes it back to the beginning, bringing the case full circle, and uncovers a new theory in the process
24.2	"Black Out - Part 2"	55:36	July 31, 2017
After 2 years investigating and bringing weekly updates on the disappearance of Tara Grinstead, Up and Vanished Season 1 is coming to a close. Payne Lindsey takes it back to the beginning, bringing the case full circle, and uncovers a new theory in the process

No.	Title	Length (minutes:seconds)	Original release date
-	"Case Evidence: October 3, 2016"	7:06	October 3, 2016
Take a deeper look at the evidence as experts discuss new developments in the case. In our first episode of Case Evidence, we recap some important information regarding the house fire on Snapdragon Road.
-	"Case Evidence: October 17, 2016"	8:58	October 17, 2016
Take a deeper look at the evidence as experts discuss new developments in the case. A forensic sketch artist for the GBI discusses the possibility of creating a composite nearly 11 years later.
-	"Case Evidence: October 31, 2016"	12:11	October 31, 2016
Take a deeper look at the evidence as experts discuss new developments in the case.
-	"Case Evidence: November 28, 2016"	10:55	November 28, 2016
In this episode of Case Evidence, Payne answers calls from our listeners.
-	"Case Evidence: December 12, 2016"	6:51	December 12, 2016
Take a deeper look at the evidence as experts discuss new developments in the case.
-	"Case Evidence: January 9, 2017"	17:25	January 9, 2017
Take a deeper look at the evidence as experts discuss new developments in the case. Today we have a special guest, the hosts of another investigative podcast called Accused. Amber and Amanda weigh in on Payne's investigation.
-	"Case Evidence: January 23, 2017"	37:21	January 23, 2017
Take a deeper look at the evidence as experts discuss new developments in the case.
-	"Case Evidence: February 6, 2017"	30:55	February 6, 2017
Take a deeper look at the evidence as experts discuss new developments in the case. We go through old news transcripts to learn more about the weekend of October 22nd 2005. Maurice takes calls from the voicemail line.
-	"Case Evidence: March 6, 2017"	49:47	March 6, 2017
Take a deeper look at the evidence as experts discuss new developments in the case.
-	"Case Evidence: March 20, 2017"	53:07	March 20, 2017
Take a deeper look at the evidence as experts discuss new developments in the case.
-	"Case Evidence: April 3, 2017"	45:07	April 3, 2017
Take a deeper look at the evidence as experts discuss new developments in the case.
-	"Case Evidence: April 17, 2017"	23:55	April 17, 2017
Take a deeper look at the evidence as experts discuss new developments in the case.
-	"Case Evidence: May 1, 2017"	27:56	May 1, 2017
Take a deeper look at the evidence as experts discuss new developments in the case.
-	"Case Evidence: May 15, 2017"	36:14	May 15, 2017
Take a deeper look at the evidence as experts discuss new developments in the case.
-	"Case Evidence: June 12, 2017"	28:05	June 12, 2017
For the first time, Payne Lindsey, Dr. Godwin and Philip Holloway sit down together to discuss the Tara Grinstead Case.
-	"Case Evidence: June 26, 2017"	46:33	June 26, 2017
Take a deeper look at the evidence as experts discuss new developments in the case.
-	"Case Evidence: July 10, 2017"	53:31	July 10, 2017
In this episode we hear a conversation that involves Bo Dukes.
-	"Case Evidence: July 24, 2017"	34:38	July 24, 2017
Take a deeper look at the evidence as experts discuss new developments in the case.

No.	Title	Length (minutes:seconds)	Original release date
-	"Q & A: December 12, 2016"	14:02	December 12, 2016
Maurice Godwin answers some of your questions from the voicemail line with Payne Lindsey.
-	"Q & A: January 19, 2017"	14:30	January 19, 2017
Dr. Maurice Godwin answers your questions from our Voicemail line. Have a question? Call us at 770-545-6411.
-	"Q & A: February 16, 2017"	25:40	February 16, 2017
Dr. Maurice Godwin answers your questions from our Voicemail line. Have a question? Call us at 770-545-6411.
-	"Q & A: March 2, 2017"	16:04	March 2, 2017
Payne Lindsey answers your questions from our Voicemail line. Have a question? Call us at 770-545-6411.
-	"Q & A: March 17, 2017"	26:21	March 17, 2017
Payne Lindsey and Philip Holloway answer your questions from our Voicemail line and from social media. Have a question?
-	"Q & A: March 30, 2017"	44:50	March 30, 2017
Payne Lindsey and Philip Holloway answer your questions from our Voicemail line and from social media. Have a question? Call us at 770-545-6411.
-	"Q & A: April 13, 2017"	27:15	April 13, 2017
Payne Lindsey and Philip Holloway answer your questions from our Voicemail line and from social media. Have a question? Call us at 770-545-6411.
-	"Q & A: April 27, 2017"	22:18	April 27, 2017
Payne Lindsey and Philip Holloway answer your questions from our Voicemail line. Have a question? Call us at 770-545-6411
-	"Q & A: May 11, 2017"	23:21	May 11, 2017
Philip Holloway answers your questions from our Voicemail line. Have a question? Call us at 770-545-6411.
-	"Q & A: May 26, 2017"	28:28	May 26, 2017
Payne Lindsey and Philip Holloway answer your questions from our Voicemail line. Have a question? Call us at 770-545-6411.
-	"Q & A: June 23, 2017"	19:00	June 23, 2017
Philip Holloway answers your questions from our Voicemail line. Have a question? Call us at 770-545-6411.
-	"Q & A: July 6, 2017"	25:39	July 6, 2017
Payne Lindsey and Philip Holloway answer your questions from our Voicemail line. Have a question? Call us at 770-545-6411.
-	"Q & A: July 20, 2017"	27:54	July 20, 2017
Payne Lindsey, Dr. Godwin, and Philip Holloway answers your questions from our Voicemail line. Have a question? Call us at 770-545-6411.
-	"Q & A: August 3, 2017"	43:22	August 3, 2017
Thank you for your support this season! Enjoy our final Q&A episode with Payne, Dr G and Phil Holloway.
-	"Q & A: November 20, 2017"	46:57	November 20, 2017
On this Q&A episode, we take the best questions from the audience at our UAV Live Tour stops around the country.

No.	Title	Length (minutes:seconds)	Original release date
-	"Live Episode: Live in Atlanta"	37:43	February 13, 2017
This week we hosted our first ever live episode of UAV. We invited about 50 listeners (via out Twitter page) to join us in Atlanta to discuss the case. No topic was out of bounds. Stay tuned for our next live episode.
-	"The Kalief Browder Story"	1:15:58	February 22, 2017
Rabia, Colin, and Susan bring you a special crossover episode where they discuss Time: The Kalief Browder Story, an upcoming docuseries about the story of Kalief Browder. The series chronicles the life of a 16 year-old student from the Bronx who spent three years on Rikers Island without ever being convicted of a crime. The Undisclosed team is joined by fellow podcasting hosts Brooke Gittings of Actual Innocence, Bob Ruff of Truth & Justice, and Payne Lindsey of Up & Vanished.
-	"Breaking News: GBI Press Conference"	1:35	February 23, 2017
There will be a GBI press conference today at 3pm in Ocilla for the first time in 10 years. Payne will be there recording and will update the podcast feed with any new info.
-	"Breaking News: Did Ryan Duke Kill Tara Grinstead?"	2:46	February 23, 2017
Ryan Duke, former student at Irwin County High School, has been arrested for the 2005 murder of Tara Grinstead.
-	"Breaking News: Second Suspect Arrested"	1:10	March 3, 2017
A second suspect and classmate of Ryan Duke's has been arrested in connection with Tara Grinstead's murder.
-	"Bonus Episode: Aftermath in Ocilla"	27:53	May 19, 2017
In this Bonus Episode we learn more about the aftermath in the small town of Ocilla, GA.
-	"Live Episode: Live from CrimeCon 2017"	48:23	June 16, 2017
The Up and Vanished team travels to Indianapolis, IN for the first ever CrimeCon 2017 in this Bonus Episode!
-	"Live Episode: Season Finale Live in Atlanta + Q&A"	1:12:11	August 7, 2017
On July 30th at Terminal West in Atlanta we gathered with a few hundred Up and Vanished supporters to listen to the Season finale live, followed by a Q&A. Check it out!
-	"Live Episode: UAV Live Tour"	33:58	September 22, 2017
If you haven't had a chance to make it out to the Up and Vanished Live Tour, this episode gives you a peak inside of the live show.
-	"Everyone Is A Suspect: Presented by Up and Vanished and Murder on the Orient Express"	29:38	October 27, 2017
Up and Vanished and Murder on the Orient Express present a podcast exclusive, "Everyone Is a Suspect." True crime often inspires the most successful fictional crime stories. When told by a visionary novelist like Dame Agatha Christie, dubbed "The Queen of Crime," these fictional stories can become larger than life and even more compelling than truth. "Everyone Is a Suspect" dives deeper into both fact and fiction, taking a closer look at the “Crime of the Century," the 1932 Lindbergh Baby kidnapping, which, along with Christie’s own experiences as a passenger on the Orient express, inspired her to write the 1934 novel Murder on the Orient Express. In true Up and Vanished fashion, host Payne Lindsey will reexamine the Lindbergh kidnapping case, and even retrace Christie’s steps by embarking on his own trip aboard the Orient Express. In preparation for the November 10th premiere of Murder on the Orient Express, the podcast will also include interview episodes titled, "The Suspects.” Each episode will focus on the upcoming film, featuring a collection of cast interviews, discussing the MOTOE novel and film, the parallels between true crime and fiction, podcasting, and more. Mixed by: ResonateRecordings.com
-	"The Suspects: Part 1: Presented by Up and Vanished and Murder on the Orient Express"	34:48	November 3, 2017
Payne Lindsey talks True Crime with “The Suspects” in these exclusive interviews with the cast of Murder On the Orient Express. Mixed by ResonateRecordings.com
-	"Bonus Episode: 12 Years Later"	44:24	November 6, 2017
We take a look back at the disappearance of Tara Grinstead, 12 years later. Plus, new indictments and updates on the case.
-	"The Suspects: Part 2: Presented by Up and Vanished and Murder on the Orient Express"	33:33	November 10, 2017
Payne Lindsey delves into the making of Murder On the Orient Express, discussing “behind the scenes” with the cast. Mixed by ResonateRecordings.com

=== Season 2 (2018) ===
No.	Title	Length (minutes:seconds)	Original release date
1	"Stay on the Trail"	38:00	August 20, 2018
This is for Kristal and her family.
2	"Welcome to Crestone"	44:02	August 27, 2018
37.9964° N, 105.6997° W
3	"Speculation"	37:31	September 5, 2018
With rumors, there's always some amount of truth...
4	"Drum Circle"	40:53	September 10, 2018
You can buy a lot of meth with twenty grand.
5	"Catfish"	37:05	September 24, 2018
Mama said don't go near the river.
6	"The Circle is Small"	29:05	October 1, 2018
There's a lot of finger pointing going on here.
7	"What We Know"	31:13	October 8, 2018
Who. What. Where. When.
8	"The Phone"	31:11	October 22, 2018
Incoming call from...
9	"Gone Fishin'"	1:02:33	October 29, 2018
Siluriformes.
10	"Too Many Cats"	46:47	November 6, 2018
How convenient.
11	"The Search"	32:25	November 14, 2018
Chance, hunt.
12	"Muddy Waters"	58:29	November 27, 2018
www.ForKasha.com

No.	Title	Length (minutes:seconds)	Original release date
-	"Q & A: 9.16.18"	37:02	September 17, 2018
Payne and the UAV team answer listener questions.
-	"Q & A: 10.15.18"	28:39	October 15, 2018
Payne and the UAV team answer listener questions.
-	"Q & A: 11.19.18"	25:38	November 19, 2018
Payne and the UAV team answer listener questions.
-	"Q & A: 12.03.18"	38:57	December 4, 2018
Payne and team have a round table discussion to answer listener questions.

No.	Title	Length (minutes:seconds)	Original release date
-	"Insight: Crestone"	36:21	September 21, 2018
Crestonians speak about the place they call home.
-	"Insight: Kristal"	26:59	October 13, 2018
Who is Kristal Reisinger? Hear from some of the people who knew her best. / Friend, daughter and mother.
-	"Looking Back / Looking Forward"	30:52	December 11, 2018
Pressing pause on the podcast, but not the effort to find answers. In this episode, we reflect on memories of Kristal, final thoughts, and the making of this season.

== Reception ==
From its first publication, Up and Vanished has been met with mixed reactions. Listeners either supported Lindsey's quest for answers, while some believed he was opening up old wounds. One person attributed the case being solved to the podcast.

In 2017, the Up and Vanished podcast won a Webby Award in the Podcasts & Digital Audio category for Documentaries. In 2019, the show won Best Crime Podcast at the iHeartRadio Podcast Awards.

== Adaptations ==
=== Television ===
In 2018, true crime network Oxygen announced that they would premiere a television special based on the podcast. On January 9, 2020, it was announced that the series would premiere on February 15, 2020.

At just over an hour long, this television special focused on investigating the crime and the two parties that confessed to the crime. Lindsey and his team set out to interview people in the community, which included Tara Grinstead's friends and people in law enforcement. The show mixed actual photos and videos from the investigation and dramatized reenactments to tell the story that the podcast did. A great deal of the show was dedicated to investigating Bo Dukes and Ryan Duke.

== See also ==
- Tara Grinstead murder case
- List of American crime podcasts
