= Steve Tello =

American television executive

Stephen J. Tello (born 18 May 1950 in Boston, Massachusetts), known as Steve Tello, is a television executive with over 3 decades of experience working in television news and sports. He currently (2009) holds the position of Senior Vice President and General Manager of FOX Sports Florida, a unit of the Fox Entertainment Group.

Tello is based in Fort Lauderdale, Florida, and oversees the Fox Sports Cable group's Sun Sports and Fox Sports Florida. The Florida network has offices in Orlando and Tampa. Prior to this Florida assignment, Tello held the same title in Houston, Texas, for Fox Sports' FSHouston operation, which produces the Astros and Rockets games to 4.2 million viewers.

Tello grew up in Miami and has lived in 11 cities during his career including Atlanta, Washington DC, New York City, London, and Los Angeles. He has traveled extensively on many projects over the course of his sojourn.

== Television Networks ==
Tello started his career as a news operations manager at WPLG-TV in Miami, Florida, responsible for their sports and news business operations. He was recruited to the ABC Network and ultimately became a senior producer for World News Tonight with Peter Jennings. He was based in London for several years and produced news broadcasts and specials with Jennings all over the world. Tello transferred to the Washington Bureau of ABC News and was Executive Producer working with Frank Reynolds as the anchor. During Reynolds' illness and after his death, David Brinkley was the anchor for the World News Tonight based in Washington, D.C.. In 1992, Tello left ABC and moved to a senior management role as President of Broadcast and Production for Speer Communications. In 1998, he joined Fox Cable Group as Fox was building its regional sports network. He managed the Sports News operation for several years in Los Angeles as SVP and was later asked to run the Pittsburgh and Houston sports networks as their cable and satellite viewership grew.

== Cameras in the Courtroom ==
While working for Post-Newsweek station WPLG-TV, Tello and lawyer Talbot "Sandy" D'Alemberte ( former American Bar President and Florida State University President ) were successful in the precedent-setting movement to place cameras in the courtrooms in the State of Florida. These efforts in Florida spread to many states across the country allowing camera coverage in their courts over subsequent years.

== Education ==
Steve Tello graduated from Florida International University with a BA degree in Journalism and Communications. He returned to the school as an adjunct to teach television production and TV journalism and remained involved with the school while living in Miami.

== Honors ==
Tello has won numerous awards in his career, including five regional Emmy Awards, Associated Press TV awards and the UPI Oversees Press Award. In 1993, he was awarded the Joseph A. Sprague Memorial Award for his unique achievement in securing a place for cameras in courtrooms around the country. He was honored in 2002 with the Distinguished Alumni award for continuing contributions, and the Hall of Fame award from Florida International University.

== Affiliations ==
- Texas Bowl committee board member
- Pittsburgh YMCA board member
- Pittsburgh Convention Bureau's Sports Task Force
- Florida International University Adjunct
- University of Montana Journalism board member 2002 - 2004
