= Tara Grinstead murder case =

Missing person case in Georgia (U.S. state)

Tara Grinstead
- Born: Tara Faye Grinstead; November 14, 1974; Hawkinsville, Georgia, U.S.
- Disappeared: October 22, 2005 (aged 30); Ocilla, Georgia, U.S.
- Status: Declared dead in absentia in December 2010
- Education: Middle Georgia College; Valdosta State University
- Height: 5 ft 3 in (160 cm)–5 ft 5 in

Tara Faye Grinstead (born November 14, 1974) was an American high school history teacher from Ocilla, Georgia, who went missing on October 22, 2005, and was declared dead in 2010.

On February 23, 2017, a press conference was held by the Georgia Bureau of Investigation (GBI) formally announcing that a tip that had been received led to the arrest of Ryan Alexander Duke for Grinstead's murder and concealment. On March 3, 2017, an additional arrest was made public in connection with Grinstead's disappearance when Duke's former classmate Bo Dukes was charged with attempting to conceal a death, hindering apprehension and tampering with evidence.

== Early life ==
Grinstead was born November 14, 1974, in Hawkinsville, Georgia to Bill and Faye (née Bennett) Grinstead. She had one sibling, Anita Grinstead. Tara won the title of Miss Tifton in 1999 and competed in the Miss Georgia beauty pageant. Her winnings from this pageant and many others that she had entered helped her pay for college. Grinstead graduated from Middle Georgia College in Cochran and in 2003 earned a master's degree in education at Valdosta State University. In 1998, she began teaching history at Irwin County High School in Ocilla.

== Disappearance ==
On October 22, 2005, the night before her disappearance, Grinstead visited a beauty pageant, for which she was a coach to young contestants, and attended a barbecue. On October 24, a Monday morning, she did not show up for work. Co-workers called police, who went to the home where she lived alone. They found Grinstead's cell phone inside the house and her car outside. Her purse and keys were gone.

Local police immediately called in the Georgia Bureau of Investigation (GBI), feeling that "something was wrong" and the case was beyond the resources of the small town police department. The GBI found no signs of forced entry and no sign of a struggle.

Irwin County High School principal Bobby Conner was quoted by The Atlanta Journal-Constitution as saying, "We're a small community and this has really touched home because it is something you read about happening elsewhere. This is someone with a tremendous, magnetic personality, and the kids just love her."

== Investigation ==
In 2008, the Grinstead case received renewed attention with a report on the CBS News show 48 Hours Mystery, which noted the similarity of Grinstead's disappearance to that of another young woman, Jennifer Kesse, in Orlando, Florida, three months later.

In connection with that 48 Hours story, police revealed that they had found DNA on a latex glove that was found in Grinstead's yard, "just a stone's throw from her front stoop", according to an interview with Gary Rothwell of the GBI:

Rothwell did not identify as a suspect the person whose DNA was found in the glove, but he said that person could help lead to a break in the case. "We believe it is a critical element to solving the case," Rothwell said.
Rothwell said the DNA has been analyzed and agents know it's a man's DNA. But they haven't identified the man. Over the course of the investigation, he said, agents have compared the DNA to dozens of men who knew Grinstead or who were associated with her. "None of them matched," Rothwell said. The DNA also has been entered into Georgia and national databases, but still no matches."

In February 2009, videos surfaced on the Internet featuring a self-proclaimed serial killer. Dubbing himself the "Catch Me Killer", the man in the videos detailed what he claimed to be his sixteen female victims, and one of these women was determined by authorities to be Grinstead. Although the man's face and voice were digitally obscured, police eventually determined the videos' creator to be 27-year-old Andrew Haley. A police investigation revealed the videos to be part of a bizarre, elaborate hoax, and Haley was ultimately eliminated as a substantial lead in Grinstead's disappearance.

In 2011, the chief GBI investigator said that "this case has never gone cold", adding that leads still come in on a weekly basis.

Running from 2016 to 2017, the Up and Vanished podcast was credited by officials and media for helping shed new light on the evidence and reigniting public interest in the case.

On February 23, 2017, the GBI announced that they had received a tip that led to the arrest of Ryan Alexander Duke for Grinstead's murder. About three years before Grinstead's disappearance, Duke had attended Irwin County High School, where Grinstead was employed as a teacher. According to warrants read in court, on the day Grinstead disappeared, Duke was burglarizing her home, and when she caught him in the act, he strangled her and removed her body from the house. Another arrest, on March 3, 2017, was made public in connection with Grinstead's disappearance. Bo Dukes, a former classmate of Duke with no familial relation, was charged with attempting to conceal a death, hindering apprehension and tampering with evidence. Grinstead's sister, Anita Gattis, said that she has known Bo Dukes' family for years but never connected him with any part of her sister's disappearance.

== Legal proceedings ==
In August 2017, a grand jury filed four new charges against Dukes: two counts of making false statements, one count of hindering apprehension of a criminal and one count of concealing the death of another. These additional charges are based on a Wilcox County indictment stating that Dukes had lied to a GBI official who had questioned him in 2016 concerning the disappearance of Grinstead.

After Ryan Duke and Bo Dukes were arrested, Irwin County judge Melanie Cross issued a gag order prohibiting anyone involved with the case from talking about it in order to protect Duke's right to a fair trial. Georgia television stations WMAZ and WXIA challenged the order in court, and Judge Cross relaxed the order but still "restricted public comment by anyone working with the prosecution or defense, court staff, and current and former police officers on the case." WMAZ and WXIA again took this order to court and the case went to the Supreme Court of Georgia in October 2017. In March 2018, the gag order was tossed out in a unanimous opinion.

The trial of Bo Dukes began on March 19, 2019. He was found guilty for his role in helping cover up the murder and was sentenced to 25 years in prison on March 22, 2019.

Ryan Duke's murder trial was set for April 1, 2019, but the Georgia Supreme Court delayed the trial on March 28, 2019, after Duke's lawyers contended that they were unconstitutionally denied funds for experts to testify on Duke's behalf. The trial began on May 9, 2022. At the trial, Duke pleaded not guilty to murder, and blamed Dukes for the killing. On May 20, 2022, Duke was found not guilty of murder, aggravated assault and burglary, but guilty of concealing a death. Three days later Duke was given the maximum sentence of ten years in prison.

On February 27, 2025, additional charges that had been brought against the two men in Ben Hill County, Georgia related to the case were thrown out by an appeals court. The decision did not affect the original sentences in the case.

== See also ==
- List of people who disappeared mysteriously: post-1970
- Disappearance of Jennifer Kesse
