= Payne Lindsey =

American podcaster and documentary filmmaker

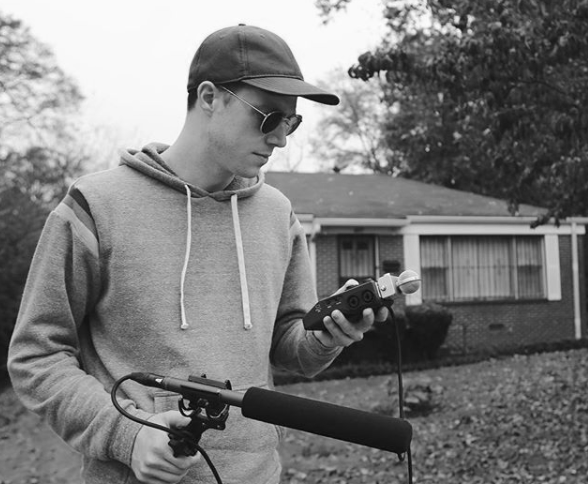
- Born: November 21, 1987 (age 38); Kennesaw, Georgia, U.S.
- Occupations: Director; Documentary Filmmaker; Podcast host
- Known for: Up and Vanished; Atlanta Monster
- Spouse: Cassie House (m. 2016; div. 2018)
- Website: paynelindsey.com

Payne Lindsey (born November 21, 1987) is an American director, documentary filmmaker, Right Side of the Tree lead singer and podcast host. He is best known for co-creating and hosting the hit investigative journalist and true crime podcasts Up and Vanished and Atlanta Monster.

== Early life ==
Lindsey was born and raised in Kennesaw, Georgia. He obtained his first video camera at age 10 and later directed local television commercials and music videos. As a child, he wanted to direct feature films. Lindsey made a 13-minute documentary film about people that he met on a cross-country road trip and entered it into festivals. He attended college on and off for a few years, but hated school. At age 23, his dad cut him off and he began focusing on creating and directing videos.

== Career ==
=== Up and Vanished ===
In December 2015, Netflix released Making a Murderer. Lindsey watched the show and realized that he wanted to do something similar. With an early interest in investigative journalism, Lindsey was inspired to investigate the disappearance of beauty queen and school teacher Tara Grinstead, a well-known cold case in Georgia. At the time, Lindsey's intentions were to develop Grinstead's story into a documentary film, but he realized he did not have the funds to film interviews on location. Lindsey realized that he "could produce a podcast at home in my boxers," and created Up and Vanished. Lindsey did not have access to police files, so instead scoured through old news articles and online forums to hunt out possible leads. Lindsey's grandmother lived in Tifton, Georgia, near Ocilla, where Grinstead had gone missing. Lindsey broadcast in real-time, week by week, in audio form. Within a 12-month period the podcast received over 50 million downloads, which propelled Grinstead's case into the mainstream media. This helped uncover previously unnoticed evidence which lead to the decade-old case being cracked and two arrests made. Lindsey began podcasting full time once Up and Vanished increased in popularity. A second season of Up and Vanished covered the disappearance of Kristal Reisinger.

=== Tenderfoot TV ===
After Up and Vanished, together with his business partner Donald Albright, Lindsey launched the content creation company Tenderfoot TV which is based in Atlanta. Together with Tenderfoot TV and Oxygen Lindsey and Albright developed a TV docu-series from Up and Vanished. As of January 2020, Oxygen and Tenderfoot TV are working to develop a television special about Kristal Reisinger which will be produced by Lindsey.

In addition to Up and Vanished and Atlanta Monster, Tenderfoot TV also produced the podcasts To Live and Die in L.A., Culpable,, This Day in Crime and Somebody. Meredith Stedman is the Creative Producer at the company. As of June 2019, the company had over 400 million total downloads for its podcasts. Tenderfoot TV is represented by United Talent Agency.

=== Atlanta Monster ===
In early 2018, in partnership with HowStuffWorks, Lindsey launched Atlanta Monster, a new podcast about the infamous Atlanta Child Murders, which occurred between 1979 - 1981 with over 25 victims murdered in Atlanta. Lindsey had never heard of the case until his business partner, Donald Albright, told him about the murders. Lindsey hosted the podcast and conducted the interviews featured on the podcast. The podcast had over 70 million downloads.

=== Radio Rental ===
In fall 2019, Payne Lindsey announced and released the first episode of a new podcast that features true stories with a fictional backdrop, Radio Rental. Lindsey asked Atlanta citizens to reach out and share the paranormal and scary stories to share on the podcast. The podcast is hosted by a fictional character, a 1980s-era video store employee named Terry Carnation, played by Rainn Wilson. Lindsey and Wilson connected after Wilson tweeted that he loved Lindsey's podcast, Atlanta Monster.

== Personal life ==
Lindsey is from Georgia and resides in Atlanta. In September 2016, Lindsey married Cassie House. He is currently in a relationship with fellow podcaster Sabrina Deana-Roga of Two Girls One Ghost. According to the Up and Vanished website, Lindsey has a brother, Mason Lindsey, who works as a producer for Tenderfoot TV. He is the cousin of 98.5 The Sports Hub radio host Rich Shertenlieb.

== Filmography ==
- Just Like You (2014)
- Our People (2015)
- Thank Yo Mamma (2015)
- Up and Vanished: The TV Show (2018)
