= Atlanta murders of 1979–1981 =

Series of at least 28 murders, mostly of children, in Atlanta, Georgia

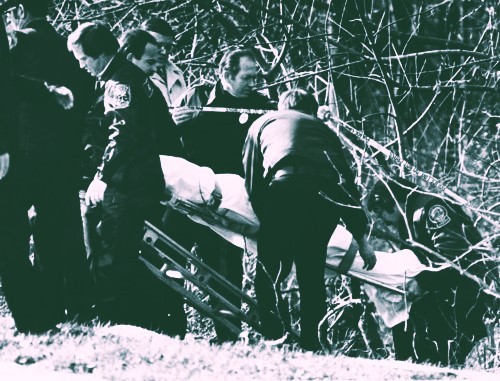
- DeKalb County police officers recover the body of a victim of the Atlanta murders
- Location: Atlanta, Fulton County, DeKalb County, Cobb County, Douglas County
- Date: July 21, 1979 – May 21, 1981
- Target: Children and young adults in the Atlanta metropolitan area
- Attack type: Serial killing, kidnapping
- Deaths: 30
- Verdict: Guilty on both counts
- Convictions: Malice murder (2 counts)
- Sentence: Two consecutive life sentences with the possibility of parole
- Convicted: Wayne Williams (2 murders)

The Atlanta murders of 1979–1981, also called the Atlanta child murders, are a series of murders committed in Atlanta, Georgia, United States between July 1979 and May 1981. Over the two-year period, at least 28 African-American children, adolescents, and adults were killed. Wayne Williams, an Atlanta native who was 23 years old at the time of the last murder, was arrested, tried, and convicted of two of the adult murders and sentenced to two consecutive life terms.

Police subsequently have attributed a number of the child murders to Williams, although he has not been charged in any of those cases, and Williams himself maintains his innocence, notwithstanding the fact that the specific style and manner of the killings, which was by chokehold-strangulation, ceased after his arrest.

In March 2019, the Atlanta police, under the order of Mayor Keisha Lance Bottoms, reopened the cases in hopes that new technology would lead to a conviction for the murders that were never resolved. As of November 2025, no results have been made public.

== Timeline of murders ==
=== 1979 ===
- In the middle of 1979, Edward "Teddy" Smith, 14, and Alfred "Q" Evans, 13, disappeared four days apart. Their bodies were found on July 28 in a wooded area, Smith with a .22-caliber gunshot wound in his upper back. They were believed to be the first victims of the putative "Atlanta Child Killer".
- On September 4, the next victim, 14-year-old Milton Harvey, disappeared while on an errand to the bank for his mother. He was riding a bike that was found a week later in a remote area of Atlanta. His body was not recovered until November of that year.
- On October 21, 9-year-old Yusuf Bell went to a store to buy Bruton snuff for a neighbor, Eula Birdsong, at Reese Grocery on McDaniel Street. A witness said she saw him near the intersection of McDaniel and Fulton getting into a blue car before he disappeared. His body was found on November 8 in the abandoned E. P. Johnson Elementary School by a school janitor who was looking for a place to urinate. He was found clothed in the brown cut-off shorts he was last seen wearing, though they had a piece of masking tape stuck to them. He had been hit over the head twice, and the cause of death was strangulation. Police did not immediately link his disappearance to the previous killings.

=== 1980 ===
- On March 4, 1980, the first female victim, 12-year-old Angel Lenair, disappeared. She left her house around 4pm wearing a denim outfit and was last seen at a friend's house watching the sitcom Sanford and Son. Her body was found six days later, in a wooded vacant lot along Campbellton Road, wearing the same clothes she was wearing when she had left home. A pair of white underwear that did not belong to her was stuffed in her mouth, and her hands were bound with an electrical cord. The cause of death was strangulation.
- On March 11, one week after Lenair's disappearance, 11-year-old Jeffery Mathis disappeared while on an errand for his mother. He was wearing gray jogging pants, brown shoes, and a white and green shirt. Months later a girl said she saw him get into a blue car with a light-skinned man and a dark-skinned man. His body was found in a "briar-covered patch of woodlands", 11 months after he disappeared, by which time it was not possible to identify a cause of death.
- On May 18, 15-year-old Eric Middlebrooks disappeared. He was last seen answering the telephone at home and then leaving in a hurry on his bicycle, taking with him a hammer to repair it. His body was found the following day next to it in the rear garage of an Atlanta bar which was located next door to what was then the Georgia Department of Offender Rehabilitation. His pockets were turned inside out; his chest and arms had slight stab wounds, and the cause of death was determined to be blunt force trauma to the head. A few weeks before he disappeared, Middlebrooks had testified against three juveniles in a robbery case.
- On June 9, 12-year-old Christopher Richardson went missing on his way to a local pool. He was last seen walking towards the DeKalb County's Midway Recreation Center in Midway Park. He was wearing blue shorts, a light blue shirt, and blue tennis shoes. His body was not found until the following January, clothed in unfamiliar swim trunks, along with that of a later victim, Earl Terrell. The cause of death was not determined.
- On June 22, 7-year-old LaTonya Wilson disappeared from her parents' apartment. According to a witness, she appeared to have been abducted by two men, one of whom was seen climbing into the apartment window and then holding her in his arms as he spoke to the other man in the parking lot. On October 18, her body was found in a fenced-in area at the end of Verbena Street in Atlanta. By then, it had skeletonized, and no cause of death could be established.
- The next day, June 23, 10-year-old Aaron Wyche disappeared after having been seen near a local grocery store, getting into a blue Chevrolet with either one or two black men. A female witness says she saw him being led from Tanner's Corner Grocery by a 6-foot-tall 180-pound black male, approximately 30 years old, with a mustache and goatee. The witness's description of the car matched a description of a similar one implicated in Jeffrey Mathis' disappearance. At 6pm he was seen at a shopping center. The following day, his body was found under a bridge; the official cause of death was asphyxiation from a broken neck suffered in a fall.
- In July 1980, two more children, 9-year-old Anthony Carter and 10-year-old Earl Terrell, were murdered.
- Clifford Jones, aged 13, disappeared on August 20. He was found dead from strangulation. His body was found on August 21 behind a dumpster in the rear of the former Hollywood Plaza shopping center.
- Darron Glass, aged 10, was reported missing on September 14. His body has not been recovered.
- Charles Stephens, aged 12, was reported missing on October 9. His body was found the next day on Norman Berry Drive near the entrance to a trailer park. Though he was still wearing dark blue pants, his T-shirt and one of his shoes were missing. Police determined that the cause of death was asphyxiation. Rub marks were also identified on his nose and mouth. Dog hairs and two Caucasian head hairs were found on it along with two pubic hairs, which did not belong to him or Williams, and which were found on his boxers 950 feet away. The state considered this a "pattern case" in Williams's trial.
- Aaron Jackson, aged 9, went missing on November 1. His body was discovered the next day strangled, lying face-up on a river bank.
- Patrick Rogers, aged 16, knew several of the previous victims. He went missing on November 30. His body was found on December 7 in the Chattahoochee river. Police speculated that he was dropped from the bridge above.

=== 1981 ===
- The murders continued into 1981. The first known victim in the new year was 14-year-old Lubie Geter, who disappeared on January 3. His body was found on February 5.
- Geter's friend, 15-year-old Terry Pue went missing in January. An anonymous caller told the police where to find his body. He lived in the same apartment as Edward "Teddy" Smith, who was killed in 1979.
- In February and March 1981, six more bodies were discovered, believed to be linked to the previous homicides. Among the deceased was the body of 21-year-old Eddie Duncan, the first adult victim.
- In April, 20-year-old Larry Rogers, 28-year-old John Porter, and 21-year-old Jimmy Ray Payne were murdered. Porter and Payne were ex-convicts and had just recently been released from Arrendale State Prison after serving time for burglary.
- On May 12, 1981, FBI agents found the body of 17-year-old William "Billy Star" Barrett on a curb in a wooded area near his home. A witness, 32-year-old Harold Wood, a custodian from Southwest High School, had run out of gas about a mile from the scene. He described a black man standing over and observing the location where the body was found before driving away in a white-over-blue Cadillac.
- During the end of May 1981, the last reported victim was added to the list: 27-year-old Nathaniel Cater. He was last seen by gardener Robert I. Henry at the entrance of the Rialto Theatre in Atlanta, reportedly holding hands with Wayne Williams. His body was discovered two days later.

Investigator Chet Dettlinger created a map of the victims' locations. Despite the difference in ages, the victims fell within the same geographic parameters. They were connected to Memorial Drive and 11 major streets in the area. Author Ginger Strand links the murders to freeway racism and Atlanta's massive urban renewal program that disrupted African American neighborhoods.

== Investigation and arrest ==
There were significant delays in beginning an investigation. During the murders, more than 100 agents were working on the investigation. The city of Atlanta imposed curfews, and parents in the city removed their children from school and forbade them from playing outside.

As the media coverage of the killings intensified, the FBI predicted that the killer might dump the next victim into a body of water to conceal any evidence. Police staked out nearly a dozen area bridges, including crossings of the Chattahoochee River. During a stakeout on May 22, 1981, at around 3 a.m., detectives got their first major break when an officer heard a splash beneath a bridge. Another officer saw a white 1970 Chevrolet station wagon turn around and drive back across the bridge.

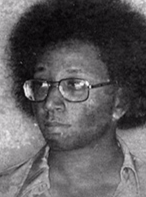
Wayne Williams

Two police cars later stopped the suspect station wagon about a half-mile from the bridge. The driver was 23-year-old Wayne Bertram Williams, a supposed music promoter and freelance photographer. The Chevrolet wagon belonged to his parents. During questioning, Williams said he was on his way to audition a woman, Cheryl Johnson, as a singer. Williams claimed she lived in the nearby town of Smyrna. Police did not find any record of her or the appointment. Police who stopped Williams on the bridge noticed gloves and a 24-inch nylon cord sitting in the passenger seat. According to police investigators, the cord looked similar to ligature marks found on Cater and other victims, but the cord was never taken into evidence for analysis.

Two days later, on May 24, the nude body of Nathaniel Cater, 27, was found floating downriver a few miles from the bridge where police had seen the suspicious station wagon. Based on this evidence, including the police officer's hearing of the splash, police believed that Williams had killed Cater and disposed of his body while the police were nearby.

Adding to a growing list of suspicious circumstances, Williams had handed out flyers in predominantly black neighborhoods calling for young people ages 11–21 to audition for his new singing group that he called Gemini. Williams failed an FBI-administered polygraph examination, though polygraph results are not admissible as evidence in criminal courts.

Fibers from a carpet in the Williams residence were found to match those observed on two of the victims. Additional fibers from the Williams's home, vehicles, and pet dog were later matched to fibers discovered on other victims. Furthermore, witness Robert Henry claimed to have seen Williams holding hands and walking with Nathaniel Cater on the night Cater is believed to have died.

On June 21, 1981, Williams was arrested. A grand jury indicted him for first-degree murder in the deaths of Nathaniel Cater and Jimmy Ray Payne, aged 22. The trial date was set for early 1982.

When the news of Williams' arrest was officially released (his status as a suspect had previously been leaked to the media), FBI Agent John E. Douglas stated that, if it was Williams, then he was "looking pretty good for a good percentage of the killings." Douglas had previously conducted an interview with People magazine about profiling the killer as a young black man. This was widely reported as the FBI effectively declaring Williams guilty, and Douglas was officially censured by the Director of the FBI.

== Trial ==
Jury selection began on December 28, 1981, and it lasted six days. Nine women and three men comprised the jury, among which were eight African Americans and four Caucasians.

The trial officially began on January 6, 1982, with Judge Clarence Cooper presiding. The most important evidence against Williams was the fiber analysis between the victims he was indicted for murdering, Jimmy Ray Payne and Nathaniel Cater, and the 12 pattern-murder cases in which circumstantial evidence culminated in numerous links between the crimes. This evidence included witnesses who testified that they had seen Williams with the victims, and some witnesses suggested that he had solicited sexual favors.

The prosecution's presentation of the case has been criticized, to the extent that in some jurisdictions it might have resulted in a mistrial. In particular, two FBI special agents testified that the chances of the victims not having come into contact with Williams was "virtually impossible", based solely on the comparative rarity of the fibers which were found on the victims which seemed to match the fibers that were found in the suspect's car and home. After reviewing the case, Georgia Supreme Court Justice George T. Smith deemed the evidence, or the lack thereof, inadmissible. On February 27, 1982, after 11 hours of deliberation, the jury found Wayne Bertram Williams guilty of the two murders. He was sentenced to two consecutive life terms in Georgia's Hancock State Prison in Sparta.

== Later developments ==
In a September 1986 issue of American music magazine Spin, journalists Robert Keating and Barry Michael Cooper (the latter of whom would later find fame as a screenwriter) reported that the Georgia Bureau of Investigation (GBI)– who had been conducting a secret investigation into potential involvement of the Ku Klux Klan in the crimes, in tandem with that of the Special Task Force on Missing and Murdered Children – discovered members of the KKK may have been involved in the murder of victim Lubie Geter, and may have been linked to the murders of fourteen others. Allegedly, a family of Klan members living outside of Atlanta had hoped to ignite a race war in Atlanta, and attempted to recruit others for this purpose. Charles T. Sanders, a narcotics dealer and recruiter for the group, was said to have told a criminal informant he intended to kill Geter several weeks before his body was found. After Geter had backed a go-cart into his car, Sanders allegedly told the informant "I'm gonna kill that black bastard. I'm gonna strangle him with my dick." Shortly thereafter, Sanders' brother Don was recorded telling another Klan member he was going out to look for "another little boy." Additionally, Charles Sanders was said to have a scar matching a description given by an eyewitness who reported seeing Geter enter the car of a white man with a "jagged scar on his neck," and a dog with hair similar to that which was found on Geter's and other victims' bodies. The article reported that in 1981, members of the GBI and officials in other law enforcement agencies opted to close their investigation and seal their findings. A handwritten transcript of a conversation between Klan members regarding Geter's murder was sent anonymously to Lynn Whatley in 1985, an attorney who was then representing Wayne Williams.

At a 1991 hearing on Williams' request for a new trial, wherein he was represented by attorneys Alan Dershowitz, William Kunstler, and Bobby Lee Cook, investigators from both Atlanta and Georgia law-enforcement agencies testified they had little or no knowledge of the GBI's investigation. At the same hearing, an informant for the GBI reported that in 1981, Charles Sanders had admitted to killing Geter while Whitaker was wearing a concealed microphone. In May 2004, about six months after becoming the DeKalb County Police Chief in November 2003, Louis Graham reopened the investigations into the deaths of the five DeKalb County victims: 10-year-old Aaron Wyche, 13-year-old Curtis Walker, 9-year-old Yusuf Bell, 17-year-old William Barrett, and 11-year-old Patrick Baltazar. Graham, one of the original investigators in these cases, said he doubted that Wayne Williams, the man convicted of two of the killings and blamed for 22 others, was guilty of all of them.

On June 21, 2006, the DeKalb County Police dropped its re-investigation of the Atlanta child murders. After resigning, Graham was replaced by the acting chief, Nick Marinelli, who said, "We dredged up what we had, and nothing has panned out, so until something does or additional evidence comes our way, or there's forensic feedback from existing evidence, we will continue to pursue the [other] cold cases that are [with]in our reach."

On January 29, 2007, attorneys for the State of Georgia agreed to allow DNA testing of the dog hair that was used to help convict Williams. This decision was in response to a legal filing as a part of Williams' efforts to appeal his conviction and life sentences. Williams' lawyer, Jack Martin, asked a Fulton County Superior Court judge to allow DNA tests on canine and human hair and blood, stating that the results might help Williams win a new trial. On June 26, 2007, the DNA test results showed that the hairs on the bodies contained the same mitochondrial DNA sequence as Williams' dog — a sequence that occurs in only about 1 out of 100 dogs. Dr. Elizabeth Wictum, director of the UC Davis laboratory that carried out the testing, told The Associated Press that while the results were "fairly significant," they "don't conclusively point to Williams' dog as the source of the hair" because the lab was able to test only for mitochondrial DNA, which, unlike nuclear DNA, cannot be shown to be unique to one dog.

Later in 2007, the FBI performed DNA tests on two human hairs found on one of the victims. The mitochondrial DNA sequence in the hairs would eliminate 99.5% of persons by not matching their DNA, and would eliminate 98% of African American persons by not matching their DNA. However, they matched Williams' DNA, thus not eliminating the possibility that the hairs were his.

On March 21, 2019, Atlanta Mayor Keisha Lance Bottoms and Atlanta Police Chief Erika Shields announced that officials would re-test evidence from the murders, which would be gathered by the Atlanta Police Department, Fulton County District Attorney's Office, and Georgia Bureau of Investigation. In a news conference, Mayor Bottoms said, "It may be there is nothing left to be tested. But I do think history will judge us by our actions and we will be able to say we tried."

In July 2021, Bottoms announced that DNA had been identified and sampled in two cases that would be subjected to additional analysis by a private lab. Investigators combed through 40% of the original DNA evidence and had sent that to the same private lab for testing on June 21, 2021. As of December 2022, no results have been made public, despite requests from the victims' families. As of 2019, Wayne Williams continued to maintain his innocence.

== Known victims ==
Known victims by date of disappearance
Name	Age	Date of disappearance	Cause of death	Official case status
Edward Smith	14	July 21, 1979	Gunshot wound to upper back from a .22-caliber weapon	Unresolved
Alfred Evans	13	July 25, 1979	Strangulation	Attributed to Williams; closed
Milton Harvey	14	September 4, 1979	Undetermined	Unresolved
Yusuf Bell	9	October 21, 1979	Strangulation	Attributed to Williams; closed
Angel Lenair	12	March 4, 1980	Ligature strangulation	Unresolved
Jeffery Mathis	11	March 11, 1980	Undetermined	Unresolved
Eric Middlebrooks	14	May 18, 1980	Blunt-force trauma to the head	Attributed to Williams; closed
Christopher Richardson	12	June 9, 1980	Strangulation	Attributed to Williams; closed
LaTonya Wilson	7	June 22, 1980	Undetermined	Unresolved
Aaron Wyche	10	June 23, 1980	Asphyxiation	Attributed to Williams; closed
Anthony Carter	9	July 6, 1980	Multiple stab wounds	Attributed to Williams; closed
Earl Terrell	10	July 30, 1980	Asphyxiation	Attributed to Williams; closed
Clifford Jones	12	August 20, 1980	Ligature strangulation	Attributed to Williams; closed
Darron Glass	10	September 14, 1980	Undetermined (body never found)	Unresolved
Charles Stephens	12	October 9, 1980	Suffocation	Attributed to Williams; closed
Aaron Jackson	9	November 1, 1980	Asphyxiation	Attributed to Williams; closed
Patrick Rogers	16	November 10, 1980	Blunt-force trauma to the head	Attributed to Williams; closed
Lubie Geter	14	January 3, 1981	Asphyxiation	Attributed to Williams; closed
Terry Pue	15	January 22, 1981	Strangulation	Attributed to Williams; closed
Patrick Baltazar	12	February 6, 1981	Strangulation	Attributed to Williams; closed
Curtis Walker	13	February 19, 1981	Asphyxiation	Attributed to Williams; closed
Joseph Bell	15	March 2, 1981	Asphyxiation	Attributed to Williams; closed
Timothy Hill	13	March 13, 1981	Asphyxiation	Attributed to Williams; closed
Eddie Duncan	21	March 20, 1981	Strangulation	Attributed to Williams; closed
Larry Rogers	20	March 22, 1981	Strangulation	Attributed to Williams; closed
Michael McIntosh	23	March 25, 1981	Asphyxiation	Attributed to Williams; closed
Jimmy Ray Payne	21	April 23, 1981	Asphyxiation	Williams tried and found guilty of crime
John Porter	28	April 23, 1981	Multiple stab wounds	Attributed to Williams; closed
William Barrett	17	May 11, 1981	Strangulation	Attributed to Williams; closed
Nathaniel Cater	27	May 22, 1981	Asphyxiation	Williams tried and found guilty of crime

== Media coverage and adaptations ==
The first national media coverage of the case was in 1980, when a team from ABC News 20/20, Stanhope Gould and Bill Lichtenstein, producer Steve Tello, and correspondent Bob Sirkin from the ABC Atlanta bureau looked into the case. They were assigned to the story after ABC News president Roone Arledge read a tiny story in the newspaper that said police had ruled out any connection between a daycare explosion, which turned out to be a faulty furnace, and the cases of lost and missing children, which had been previously unreported in the national media. In a week, the team reported on the dead and missing children, and they broke the story that the Atlanta Police Task Force was not writing down or following up on every lead they received through the police hotline that had been set up.

In 1981, British novelist Martin Amis published "The Killings in Atlanta" for The Observer, later compiled into The Moronic Inferno: And Other Visits to America (1986).

In 1982, writer Martin Pasko dedicated an issue of the comic book Saga of the Swamp Thing to "the good people of Atlanta, that they may put the horror behind them...but not forget." The story revolved around a serial killer who targeted minority children in the fictional town of Pineboro, Arkansas, who is revealed to be a demon who had possessed TV host "Uncle Barney" (a thinly veiled parody of Fred Rogers). While the demon is ultimately vanquished, the story ends on an ominous note criticizing the social inequalities that made the non-white children such attractive targets, as well as children's television shows that encourage blind trust of strangers.

In 1985, the television miniseries The Atlanta Child Murders was released. It was centered around the murders and the arrest of the suspect. It revolved mainly around the aftermath of the killings and the trials. It starred Calvin Levels, Morgan Freeman, James Earl Jones, Rip Torn, Jason Robards, Martin Sheen, and Bill Paxton. Atlanta officials criticized the film, claiming that it distorted the facts of the case. After a series of negotiations, CBS executives agreed to insert a disclaimer alerting viewers that the film is based on fact but contains fictional elements.

Also in 1985, James Baldwin published The Evidence of Things Not Seen, a non-fiction examination not only of the case and Williams' trial, but also of race relations in Atlanta and, by extension, America. The book grew out of an assignment to write about the murders for Playboy, commissioned by then-editor Walter Lowe.

In his 1995 book Mindhunter: Inside the FBI's Elite Serial Crime Unit, criminal profiler John E. Douglas said that, while he believes that Williams committed many of the murders, he does not think that he committed them all. Douglas added that he believes that law enforcement authorities have some idea of who the other killers are, cryptically adding, "It isn't a single offender, and the truth isn't pleasant."

In 2000, Showtime released a drama film titled Who Killed Atlanta's Children? starring James Belushi and Gregory Hines.

In 2002, Tayari Jones published the novel Leaving Atlanta. It focuses on the lives and experiences of three fictional fifth graders at Oglethorpe Elementary School, Tasha Baxter, Rodney Green, and Octavia Fuller, during the murder spree. During the time of the murders, Jones attended Oglethorpe Elementary School and was classmates with two of the real-life victims, Yusuf Bell and Terry Pue.

On June 10, 2010, CNN broadcast a documentary, The Atlanta Child Murders, with interviews by Soledad O'Brien with some of the people involved, including Wayne Williams. The two-hour documentary invited viewers to weigh the evidence presented and then go to CNN.com to cast votes on whether Williams was guilty, whether he was innocent, or if the case was "not proven." 68.6% of respondents said Williams was guilty, 4.3% said he was innocent, and 27.1% chose "not proven."

In the 2016 song "the ends" by American rapper Travis Scott featuring American rapper André 3000, on the former's second studio album, Birds in the Trap Sing McKnight, Atlanta-native André 3000 raps about the killings.

In January 2018, documentary filmmaker Payne Lindsey began releasing a podcast called Atlanta Monster, covering the murders with interviews from family members of victims, law enforcement officials, individuals alive in the Atlanta area at the time of the murders, and Wayne Williams.

The second season of Mindhunter (released in August 2019) covers the murders. The series, which is focused on the history of the FBI's Behavioral Science Unit (BSU) builds a dramatic arc of the series over the FBI's two BSU agents who join the Atlanta investigation. In the series fictional treatment, Agent Ford has the role of insisting that 13 murders they are investigating at the time are the work of one single serial killer, and that in order to gain the victims' trust, he may be African-American himself. This line of deduction clashes with that of his colleague Agent Tench, the Atlanta Police Department, and the African-American community of Atlanta – many of whom believe, in light of Georgia's history of hate crimes and racial violence, that the killings are the work of the Ku Klux Klan.

The Atlanta Child Murders, a three-part documentary series produced by Will Packer Productions, aired on Investigation Discovery in March 2019.

In April 2020, HBO released a 5-part documentary titled Atlanta's Missing and Murdered: The Lost Children, directed by Sam Pollard and Maro Chermayeff. HBO's documentary revealed information that focused heavily on the appeals process of the case against Wayne Williams. Williams' attorneys filed a habeas corpus document and it was denied. Similarly, his request for a retrial was denied in 2004.

== See also ==
- Post–civil rights era in African-American history
