= Disappearance of Kristal Reisinger =

American disappearance case

Kristal Reisinger
- Born: Kristal Anne Reisinger; 1987; Phoenix, Arizona, U.S.
- Disappeared: July 13, 2016 (aged 29); Crestone, Colorado, U.S.
- Status: Missing for 10 years, 2 months and 14 days
- Education: Western Colorado University
- Height: 5 ft 6 in (168 cm)
- Children: 1

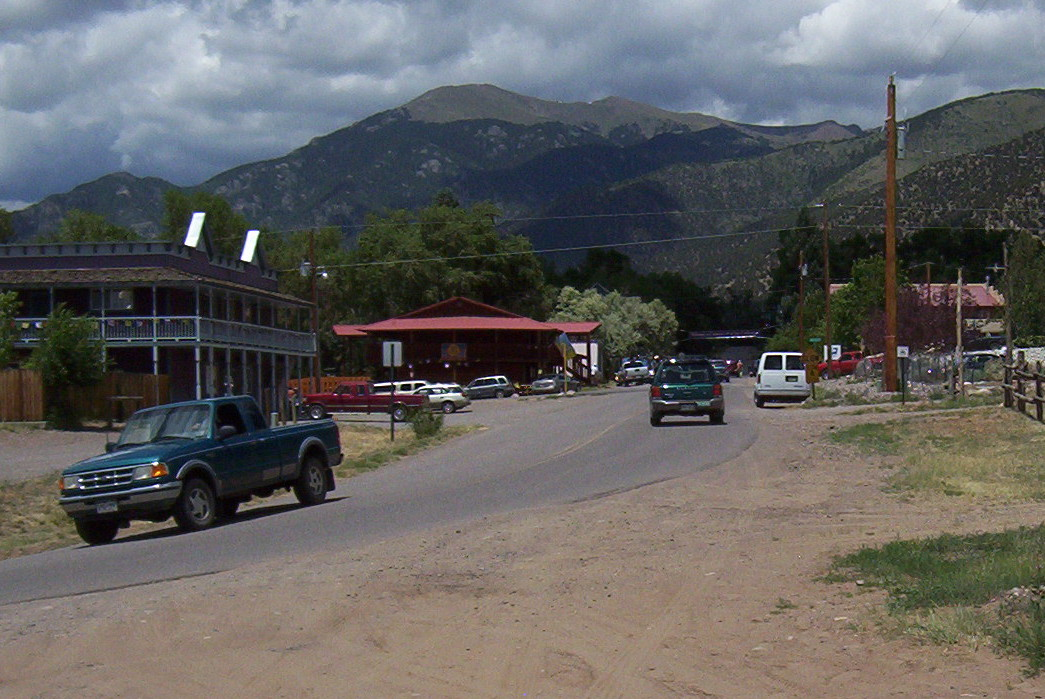
Alder Street in Crestone, Colorado

Kristal Anne Reisinger is a resident of Crestone, Colorado who went missing on July 13, 2016. A mother of one, Reisinger relocated to Crestone from Denver in order to achieve enlightenment and sobriety. While in Crestone, she worked at the Crestone Brewing Company. The last known confirmed sighting of Reisinger was on July 13 at her residence in downtown Crestone, but some have claimed to have seen her at a later date. In 2018, the Saguache County Sheriff's Office and the Colorado Bureau of Investigation announced they believed foul play was the cause of Reisinger's disappearance.

== Personal life ==
An Arizona native, Reisinger relocated to Denver to be with her aunt amid a difficult childhood. This arrangement became strained, leaving Reisinger as a ward of the court at the age of 15. At this time, Reisinger moved in with her boyfriend's parents, Rodney and Debbie Ervin. Thereafter, Reisinger spent a few years with the Ervins before attending Western State College in Gunnison, where she met her best friend Michael. During the summer vacations from college, she would live with Michael's family. After college she lived with Michael's family and the Ervins.

In 2014, Reisinger moved from Denver to Gunnison, Colorado, teaching a course and taking coursework in psychology and sociology at Western Colorado University. Later that spring, she moved to Crestone in the San Luis Valley.

Reisinger was a very spiritual person with interests in Hinduism, Buddhism, and Native American religion. She also practiced tarotology and claimed to be a clairvoyant and a medium. She has one daughter with her former boyfriend Elijah Guana.

== Disappearance ==
The Saguache County Sheriff’s Office was notified of Reisinger's prolonged absence by her landlord, Ara McDonald, on July 13, 2016. Once inside the apartment, investigators found Reisinger's cell phone and medication. Numerous Crestone residents claim to have seen her at the Full Moon Drum Circle gathering the night of July 18, 2016. McDonald and multiple sources claim the last person to have called Reisinger is a local man with a criminal history involving drugging and assaulting victims.

A $20,000 reward has been offered for any information leading to the arrest and conviction of those responsible for her disappearance.

The case was the focus of an episode of The Missing on ID Discovery.

In 2022, it was reported that pieces of human bones had been found near a campground outside of Crestone. Authorities said early in the investigation that they were not thought to belong to Reisinger. They subsequently confirmed that they were the cremains of a decedent which had been spread by his family.

On August 7, 2025, the Colorado Bureau of Investigations gave their first public update on the case in several years. The agency announced that, the day before, four cadaver dogs were used to search a specific location in Crestone "believed to be connected to the case." The results of the search were not announced but the call for tips from the public was renewed.

== See also ==
- List of people who disappeared mysteriously: post-1970
