= Atlanta Monster =

True crime podcast

- Genre: Investigative journalism; True crime
- Language: English

Cast and voices
- Hosted by: Payne Lindsey

Technical specifications
- Audio format: Podcast (via streaming or downloadable MP3)

Publication
- No. of seasons: 3
- No. of episodes: 25
- Original release: January 4, 2018
- Provider: HowStuffWorks; Tenderfoot TV
- Updates: Weekly

Related
- Website: atlantamonster.com

Atlanta Monster is an investigative journalism podcast hosted by Payne Lindsey. The series takes an in-depth look into the infamous Atlanta Child Murders, which occurred between 1979 and 1981 with over 25 victims murdered in Atlanta. The podcast was co-produced by Tenderfoot TV and HowStuffWorks.

On January 8, 2019, the podcast released a second season. Titled Monster: Zodiac, the second season explored the Zodiac murders. In January 2020, they launched a third season titled Monster: DC Sniper.

== Series overview ==
The first season of the series explores the child murders that occurred in Atlanta during 1979-1981 and the mystery behind who was the culprit of all those killings. Besides discussing the topic of the crime, the series also explores the underlying racial tensions and separation between the white and black citizens of Atlanta at the time as the victims were all black children. The series also looks at the way the city and country reacted to the murders and the way the media portrayed the victims. The podcast takes a look into the way the investigation was handled, whether the suspect they caught was the real culprit, and the way the Black and white community remembered the incident differently.

Later seasons explore other regions and times where serial killers were known to be on the loose.

== Episodes ==
No.	Title	Length (minutes:seconds)	Original release date
0	"Missing Darron Glass"	3:31	December 31, 2017
On September 14, 1980, Darron Glass went missing.
1	"Boogeyman"	46:08	January 4, 2018
It's 1979 in Atlanta - and children are going missing.
2	"Manhunt"	46:11	January 11, 2018
Atlanta’s search for a serial killer becomes more and more convoluted.
3	"Atlanta Monster Seized"	59:01	January 18, 2018
Atlanta asks, who is Wayne Williams?
4	"Gemini"	1:02:17	January 25, 2018
Wayne Williams through the eyes of those seemingly closest to him...
5	"Wayne's World"	56:01	February 1, 2018
Payne makes contact with the alleged Atlanta Monster.
6	"The Splash"	53:22	February 8, 2018
Payne and the team gear up for a closer look at the so-called "bridge incident."
7	"Conspiracy?"	50:36	February 15, 2018
Payne explores theories of Klan involvement within the case.
-	"The Vault"	1:01:43	February 22, 2018
The team behind Atlanta Monster digs deeper into untold stories
8	"CIA"	47:29	March 2, 2018
What car did Wayne really drive? Where did the reward money go? And was Wayne scouted by the CIA?
-	"The List"	50:22	March 9, 2018
One thing is clear -- no one can agree on The List.
9	"The Trial"	51:55	March 15, 2018
Trial by trace evidence
10	"Loose Ends"	1:10:00	March 22, 2018
In this case, the truth depends on who you choose to believe.
-	"Questions: Part 1"	38:30	April 26, 2018
Payne and the team answer listener questions.
-	"Questions: Part 2"	30:57	May 3, 2018
Payne and the team answer more listener questions.
-	"Live from SXSW"	1:01:31	May 17, 2018
Live from the TuneIn stage at SXSW, the team gives a behind-the-scenes look at the creation of Atlanta Monster. Moderated by Tracy Kaplan.
-	"Live from CrimeCon"	56:07	June 14, 2018
Live from CrimeCon 2018, Payne Lindsey and team take you inside the hit podcasts Atlanta Monster and Up and Vanished. Moderated by HowStuffWorks’ Jason Hoch.
-	"The Night Shift"	38:03	July 27, 2018
Recalling Wayne's time working as a stringer... under the cover of night.
-	"The Sheriff"	38:00	August 22, 2018
Why is Sidney Dorsey so important to this case? What role did he have in the Atlanta Child Murders, and why is he in a Georgia Prison?
-	"The Mindhunter Himself & ATLM Update"	75:14	August 1, 2019
Current Atlanta mayor reopens investigation and an interview with criminal profiler John Douglas about his work on this case.

== See also ==
- List of American crime podcasts
