= Paul Runge =

Paul Runge may refer to:

- Paul Runge (umpire) (born 1941), Canadian-born American baseball umpire
- Paul Runge (ice hockey) (1908–1972), Canadian ice hockey player
- Paul Runge (infielder) (born 1958), American baseball player
- Paul Runge (serial killer) (born 1970), American serial killer
