= Mark of a Killer =

American true crime television series

- Genre: True crime Docudrama
- Written by: Steve Bronstein
- Directed by: Chad Cunningham; Seth Jarrett; Christopher Mitchell
- Narrated by: Laura San Giacomo
- Composer: David Starck
- Country of origin: United States
- Original language: English
- No. of seasons: 4
- No. of episodes: 30

Production
- Executive producers: Christopher Sgueglia; Wendy Greene
- Producers: Graziano Bruni; Steve Bronstein; John Girod; Randee Brown
- Cinematography: Christopher Lane
- Running time: 45 minutes
- Production company: Jupiter Entertainment

Original release
- Network: Oxygen
- Release: January 20, 2019 – present

The Mark of a Killer (or simply Mark of a Killer) is an American true crime television series currently airing on the Oxygen Network. The program examines the behaviors of serial killers. As of Season 3, the series is currently titled Mark of a Serial Killer.

== Synopsis ==
Each 45 minutes-long episode follows the story of an investigation guided by the killer's postmortem signature and features first-hand accounts from detectives and prosecutors who worked on the cases, interviews with criminal psychology experts and with family members and friends of the victims or the perpetrators.

The show has regular participants criminal psychologists/experts, like: Katherine Ramsland, Joni E. Johnston and Mark Safarik. Other experts are also appearing in the series for one-one episode like Michael H. Stone or Dayle Hinman.

== Episodes ==
Season	Episodes	Originally released	
Season	Episodes	First released	Last released
1	6	January 20, 2019	March 3, 2019
2	10	April 9, 2020	June 13, 2020
3	10	April 12, 2021	November 7, 2021
4	4	April 2, 2022	April 23, 2022

== Season 1 (2019) ==
No. overall	No. in season	Title	Location	Killer	Original release date
1	1	Posed to Kill	Gainesville, Florida	Danny Rolling	January 20, 2019
In 1990, a killer start to terrorize the University of Florida’s campus by killing students. "The Gainesville Ripper" leaves behind a bizarre crime scene where the female victims have been posed. After clearing their prime suspects name, detectives turn to VICAP to solve the case.
2	2	The Last Call Killer	New Jersey & Staten Island	Richard Rogers	January 27, 2019
In the early 1990s; four bodies are found dismembered, bagged, and thrown in roadside garbage cans. The "Last Call Killer" hunted his victims openly in piano bars. However no one suspected he could be hiding in plain sight, working as a local nurse.
3	3	An Eye For Murder	Dallas, Texas	Charles Albright	February 10, 2019
The Dallas Police Department discover three women murdered with their eyes surgically removed. Police believe they have a deranged doctor on the loose until two cops find themselves on the trail of a man with a Psycho-esque mother, a talent for taxidermy, and a hatred for women.
4	4	Pattern of Murder	Sacramento, California	Roger Kibbe	February 17, 2019
In 1986 a killer hijacks the highway as several women are found strangled with their clothing cut into precise but odd patterns. A survivor leads police to a sports car driving man, posing as a good samaritan to poach potential victims.
5	5	Momentos of Murder	Burbank, California	Rodney Alcala	February 24, 2019
When the Hillside Stranglers are caught police realize they still have another serial killer running rampant in Los Angeles. He tortures and toys with his victims while keeping pieces of their jewelry.
6	6	An Appetite for Murder	Texas & Kentucky & Illinois	Ángel Maturino Reséndiz	March 3, 2019
Authorities have a killer riding the rails and leaving a literal trail of bread crumbs after eating at victims' tables. When more murders are linked, the FBI names a Most Wanted suspect and a national manhunt for "The Railroad Killer" ensues.

== Season 2 (2020) ==
No. overall	No. in season	Title	Location	Killer	Original release date
7	1	Killer Caller	Saint Paul, Minnesota	Paul Michael Stephani	April 9, 2020
Minneapolis Police Department are hunting for a killer who confesses to a string of murders in a chilling, high-pitched voice, begging for forgiveness. No one can identify him until one woman survives a brutal attack.
8	2	Deadly Summer	New York City	David Berkowitz	April 16, 2020
In the summer of 1976, the New York City Police Department are chasing a man shooting at couples with a gigantic, .44 caliber handgun. He taunts the city with terrifying letters until police get a lead about a suspect who has shot a neighbor's dog.
9	3	Deadly Design	Brooklyn, New York	Salvatorre Perrone	April 23, 2020
Bay Ridge, Brooklyn shop keepers are afraid of closing time as a killer shoots his victims while locking up their stores. Police release surveillance footage to the press and ask the public for help to find a duffle bag wielding murderer before he strikes again.
10	4	The Other Zodiac	Queens, New York	Heriberto Seda	April 30, 2020
In the 1990s, "The Big Apple" is on edge as a killer leaves coded clues at crime scenes and declares his compulsion to choose victims by their birth signs. Police race against time before he can achieve twelve killings to complete the Zodiac.
11	5	The Smell of Death	Chicago, Illinois	John Wayne Gacy	May 7, 2020
When bodies of missing young men start washing up along the Kankakee River, a pattern emerges. A piece of evidence leads the investigators of Kankakee, Illinois to the house of a seemingly model citizen.
12	6	Hunted to death	Anchorage, Alaska	Robert Hansen	May 16, 2020
Police have found a string of murdered women in shallow graves in remote areas of the Southcentral Alaska wilderness. After months of searching, police zero in on a local family man who's been living a double life.
13	7	Collar and Leash	Tampa, Florida	Bobby Joe Long	May 23, 2020
A string of women are found dead by the side of the road in Florida with a unique ligature that looks like a dog collar and leash. Detectives are stumped until a 17-year-old girl manage to escape from a vicious kidnapper, leading police to a sadistic person.
14	8	Killer Athlete	Portland, Oregon	Randall Woodfield	May 30, 2020
The I-5 Corridor in Oregon is taken over by a brazen bandit who terrorizes the highway with a blitz of assaults and murders. The only clue to identify him is a specific athletic taping used to bind his victims.
15	9	Bound To Kill	Wichita, Kansas	Dennis Rader	June 6, 2020
A serial killer taunted police in the 1970s with brazen letters taking credit for his horrific kills. At the introduction of the computer era, the killer gets sloppy and accidentally leaves a digital clue behind.
16	10	Keys to a Killer	Baton Rouge, Louisiana	Derrick Todd Lee	June 13, 2020
In the 1990s the small-town PD of Zachary, Louisiana discover the key to solve a serial killer case when a pattern emerges with personal items missing from each local victim.

== Season 3 (2021) ==
The tenth episode is longer than the usual (1h 25 min) because it focuses on two separate killers. Also there was a six-month break between the fifth and sixth episode.

No. overall	No. in season	Title	Location	Killer	Original release date
17	1	The I-40 Killer	Newark, Delaware	Steven Brian Pennell	April 12, 2021
A miscreant is murdering and mutilating young women along the Route 40 corridor in Delaware. When investigators set up an undercover operation, the hunter soon becomes the hunted.
18	2	The I-95 Killer	Savannah, Georgia & Jacksonville, Florida	Gary Ray Bowles	April 13, 2022
Multiple men are discovered brutally murdered along Interstate 95. Investigators determine that each victim was last seen with a stranger in a bar. They ask the public for help in tracking down a dangerous drifter before he kills again.
19	3	The Charmer	Bellevue, Washington	George Russell	April 14, 2021
A series of women in the Seattle area are found brutally murdered. Police realize they may have a killer stalking the area nightclub scene. Can a chance encounter solve the case?
20	4	The Englewood Killer	Englewood, Chicago, Illinois	Andre Crawford	April 15, 2021
Chicago Police Department are investigating the murders of several women, whose bodies are discovered in abandoned buildings barefoot. Now they need to locate the merciless offender.
21	5	Classified to Kill	Joliet, Illinois	Paul Runge	April 16, 2021
Detectives believe a serial killer is using classified ads to enter his victims home. The investigation is set ablaze when flames obliterate evidence, until they make a shocking discovery.
22	6	The Interstate Killer	Illinois & Indiana	Larry Eyler	October 17, 2021
A killer crisscrosses the Midwest leaving a string of victims along U.S. Route 41. When he realizes investigators and a journalist are hot on his trail, the murderer suddenly changes his mark.
23	7	The Grim Sleeper	Downtown Los Angeles, California	Lonnie Franklin	October 24, 2021
In the 1980s a cold-blooded killer conceals his victims' bodies with trash, after disposing them in the back alleyways of Los Angeles. Suddenly, the culprit makes an anonymous 911 tip to another body.
24	8	The Tourniquet Killer	Houston, Texas	Anthony Shore	October 31, 2021
From 1992 someone start using homemade ligatures to murder his victims around Spring Branch, Houston. The brazen killer taunts the media and authorities by anonymous calls.
25	9	Deaths in the Desert	El Paso, Texas	David Leonard Wood	October 31, 2021
After multiple bodies were found in the desert, investigators race to track down a ruthless criminal who is burying his victims in shallow graves.
26	10	Summer of Fear	Phoenix, Arizona	Mark Goudeau & Dale Hausner and Samuel Dieteman	November 7, 2021
Chaos descends as two serial killers compete for the media's attention. As the bodies pile up faster the police are even more determined to solve the cases.

== Season 4 (2022) ==
No. overall	No. in season	Title	Location	Killer	Original release date
27	1	The Monster	Baton Rouge, Louisiana	Sean Vincent Gillis	April 2, 2022
Investigators in Louisiana, hunt for a particularly deviant serial murderer who carefully carves up and cuts the bodies of his victims. Can a tire track lead them to the culprit?
28	2	The Bayou Strangler	New Orleans & Kenner, Louisiana	Ronald Dominique	April 9, 2022
When multiple bodies are dumped around Louisiana's bayou area, a task force is formed to catch a killer. He targets a specific type of victims: homeless people, drug addicts and other lost souls.
29	3	The Skull Crusher	Hartford, Connecticut	Matthew Steven Johnson	April 16, 2022
Police in Connecticut investigate a string of ruthless killings in the Asylum Hill area committed by a killer with a devastating mark that leaves his victims nearly unrecognizable. With the help of Dr. Henry Lee they are determined to catch the elusive perpetrator.
30	4	The D.C. Sniper	Washington metropolitan area	John Muhammad, Lee Boyd Malvo	April 23, 2022
Someone terrorizes the entire D.C. metro area by targeting pedestrians in plain sight. Charles Moose and his team try to apprehend the serial sniper, when they get a tip from Montgomery, Alabama.
