= Murders of John Brandenburg and Keith Bibbs =

Murder victims of serial killer Larry Eyler

Forensic facial reconstructions of Adam (left) and Brad by the National Center for Missing and Exploited Children

John Ingram Brandenburg Jr. and Keith Lavell Bibbs were two young murder victims formerly known as the Newton County John Does whose remains were discovered by mushroom foragers in Lake Village, Newton County, Indiana, on October 18 and 19, 1983. Both victims were discovered alongside two other murder victims whose bodies were identified within months of their discovery. All four were victims of serial killer Larry Eyler.

Numerous efforts were made to discover the identity of these decedents, including forensic genealogy and forensic facial reconstructions generated by a forensic anthropologist which depicted how each decedent may have appeared in life. The National Center for Missing and Exploited Children also created detailed composite drawings of the decedents, who were individually known as Adam and Brad; names given by Newton County coroner Scott McCord decades after their murders in an effort to individualize and humanize the victims.

In April 2021, Brad was identified as Brandenburg Jr., a Kentucky native who disappeared from Chicago in 1983. Adam was identified in July 2023 as Bibbs who, like Brandenburg, had resided in Chicago at the time of his murder.

Brandenburg and Bibbs were collectively known as the "Newton County John Does" due to the name of the county in which their bodies were discovered.

== Discovery ==
On October 18, 1983, a middle-aged couple gathering wild mushrooms discovered two partially buried human skulls alongside an oak tree close to an abandoned farmhouse in Lake Village, Indiana. The couple immediately reported their discovery to authorities.

Indiana State Police investigators at the abandoned Lake Village farmhouse. October 19, 1983

Investigators discovered the partially decomposed bodies of four murder victims at this location. Each victim had been deceased for several months, and all four decedents had been partially buried, face upwards, with sections of the body of each victim remaining exposed above ground and loosely covered with leaves and soil, suggesting the murderer had made only rudimentary efforts to conceal each victim.

Three of these victims were buried at one side of the tree, three feet apart, with their heads facing north. The fourth decedent was buried at the other side of this tree. All four victims had been bound and stabbed more than two dozen times, and the trousers and underwear of each victim were discovered around their ankles. Furthermore, the body of one victim had been dismembered after death.

All four murders were almost immediately linked to the collective manhunt for a serial killer known as the "Interstate Killer" and the "Highway Killer", who at the time of the discovery of these bodies was believed to have already murdered up to nineteen young males across several Midwestern States. The level of decomposition of each victim and the clothing discovered upon each body suggested several weeks or months had elapsed between each murder. One victim had worn a parka, whereas the other three victims had worn clothing suggesting they had been murdered in the spring or summer. In addition, evidence retrieved from the farmhouse would lead investigators to conclude the murderer had evidently used this location as a site to restrain and torture these victims before burying their bodies alongside the oak tree.

By December 29, 1983, two of these four murder victims had been identified via dental records as Michael Christopher Bauer and John Daniel Bartlett; both of whom had been murdered by the Highway Killer in early March 1983. Contemporary investigators were unable to identify the third and fourth victims recovered at the site.

=== Perpetrator's confession ===
Eyler confessed to these four murders in a statement posthumously released by his attorney, Kathleen Zellner, following his death due to AIDS-related complications in March 1994 while incarcerated on death row at the Pontiac Correctional Center. (Note: Eyler had been detained on death row at the Pontiac Correctional Center since 1986 for the August 1984 murder of a 16-year-old Uptown male prostitute named Daniel Bridges.) His posthumous confession specifically states the two victims unidentified at the time of his death found at this abandoned farmhouse were the third and fourth victims he had murdered at this location.

According to his posthumous confession, Adam was a hitchhiker who agreed to submit to a sexual act for $75; Brad was an individual whom Eyler claimed to have been introduced to by his alleged accomplice, Robert David Little, at his Terre Haute residence. He was unaware of either of their actual identities. (Note: Reflecting on Eyler's lack of knowledge of these individuals' identities, a Lake County investigator named Dan Colin would reflect in 2015: "Larry didn't know the names. He knew the cases, but he didn't know the names. They were street kids or hitchhikers that he picked up.") In addition, he is known to have disposed of any forms of identification that he would find on his victims' possession.

== Keith Bibbs ==
Keith Bibbs
- Keith Bibbs c. 1983
- Born: June 28, 1967; Chicago, Illinois
- Disappeared: Indiana State Road 63, Terre Haute, Indiana
- Status: Identified July 24, 2023
- Died: July 20, 1983 (aged 16); Lake Village, Newton County, Indiana
- Cause of death: Homicide by stabbing
- Body discovered: October 18, 1983
- Resting place: Riverside Cemetery, Brook, Indiana
- Other names: "Adam", "Victim A," "Victim 3"
- Known for: Formerly unidentified victim of homicide
- Height: Between 5 ft 8 in (1.73 m) and 6 ft 2 in (1.88 m) (approximate)

Keith Lavell Bibbs (formerly known as Adam) was the third of the four victims to be discovered at the burial site. This victim was believed to be around fifteen to eighteen years of age, although he may have been aged in his early twenties. His hair was cut short and was black, and he was most likely between five feet eight inches and six feet two inches in height. He had received several fillings in life.

The clothing worn by this decedent included a distinctive red and black belt, inscribed with the word "devil" multiple times. The buckle contained the word "jeans". A pair of jeans and pajama bottoms were found on his remains, along with a pair of black size 12 suede boots. The boots were made in the Hush Puppies design and had metal buckles to fasten them on each side.

As with the vast majority of Eyler's murder victims, this decedent was found with his trousers and underwear around his ankles.

Eyler specifically stated this murder had been committed in July 1983, and confirmed investigators' suspicions that the victim had been a hitchhiker whom he had lured into his vehicle near Indiana State Road 63 in Terre Haute, Indiana.

Investigator Scott McCord correctly believed that Adam was likely native to the region, having initially speculated he may have been a Chicago or St. Louis native.

In July 2020, the DNA Doe Project announced their intention to identify Adam using genetic genealogy. In July 2023, Adam was formally identified via forensic genealogy as a 16-year-old Chicagoan named Keith Lavell Bibbs (also known as Kaif Bismillah).

=== Eyler's confession ===
In a formal confession released by Eyler's defense attorney, Kathleen Zellner, following her client's death, Eyler claimed that on a date he believed to be a Monday in early- or mid-July 1983, following several heated arguments with his boyfriend, John Dobrovolskis (whom Eyler had recently discovered to be engaging in a discreet sexual relationship with another man), Eyler had driven toward Terre Haute. While traveling upon State Road 63, he had encountered a hitchhiker who he described as being aged in his late teens or early twenties. According to Eyler, he offered Bibbs seventy-five dollars to allow Eyler to bind and "perform a sexual act" upon him, to which Bibbs contemplated, then agreed to his proposition. After Eyler had plied Bibbs with vodka and ethchlorvynol, he drove him to the abandoned farmhouse in Lake Village where he had earlier murdered John Bartlett, Michael Bauer, and John Brandenburg. At this location, Bibbs was bound to a wooden post, blindfolded and gagged, then stabbed multiple times in his upper and lower midsection.

According to Eyler, his last words to Bibbs were, "Okay, make your peace with God, nigger." He had then waited four or five minutes before stabbing him to death. Eyler further claimed to have confessed to this murder to his alleged accomplice, Robert David Little, whom he claimed had asked him the question, "Did he grunt or did he groan?" (Note: Investigators from the task force assembled to apprehend the Highway Killer would later discover that Eyler had placed a collect call to the home of Robert Little from a payphone close to this abandoned farmhouse in the summer of 1983.)

Eyler's confession further revealed he had intentionally buried Bibbs separately from the three Caucasian victims he had previously murdered at this location as he did not believe it to be "proper" to bury an African-American alongside European Americans.

== John Brandenburg ==
John Brandenburg Jr.
- John Brandenburg c. 1983
- Born: February 14, 1964; Jefferson County, Kentucky
- Disappeared: Chicago, Illinois
- Status: Identified April 24, 2021
- Died: c. May 29, 1983 (aged 19); Lake Village, Newton County, Indiana
- Cause of death: Homicide by stabbing
- Body discovered: October 19, 1983
- Resting place: Rest Haven Cemetery, Corbin, Kentucky
- Other names: "Brad," "Victim B," "Victim 4"
- Known for: Formerly unidentified victim of homicide
- Height: Between 5 ft 11 in (1.80 m) and 6 ft 1 in (1.85 m) (approximate)

John Ingram Brandenburg Jr. (formerly known as Brad) was the fourth and final murder victim discovered at the abandoned farmhouse. This victim was determined to be a white male most likely aged between seventeen and twenty-three years old. (Note: In his posthumous confession, Eyler would recollect this victim as being aged between twenty and twenty-five years old. Further testing also indicated he may have been as old as twenty-eight.) He had medium length, reddish or auburn, wavy hair, weighed between 130 and 180 pounds and was most likely between five feet eleven inches and six feet one inches in height. (Note: Eyler himself described Brandenburg as being approximately the same height as himself (6 ft 1 in.).) This decedent had also received several fillings in life and, in the years prior to his murder, had severely fractured his nose and left ankle. In addition, staining evident upon the teeth indicated he may have been a smoker.

The clothing worn by this decedent included size 30x30 brown slacks, white jockey undershorts (which had been lowered to his ankles), and size 10 brown leather hiking boots described as being ankle-high with a fleece interior.

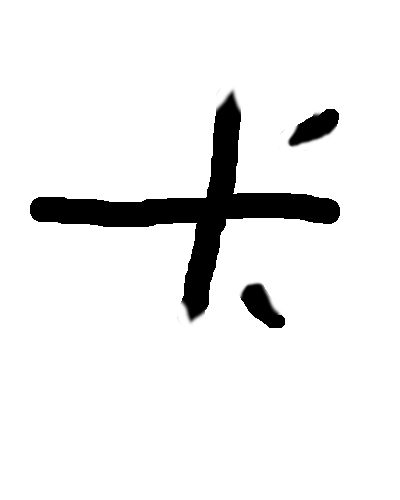
Reconstruction of the cross-like tattoo located on the underside of Brandenburg's right forearm

This decedent had two known tattoos on opposite sides of his right forearm—both of which were moderately preserved and recognizable. One of these tattoos depicted either a crudely inscribed Chinese character or a cross with two circular marks. This tattoo was located on the underside of the decedent's arm close to the wrist; the other was a rectangular (or possibly U-shaped) marking containing one circular mark, which was located on the other side of his forearm. The crude nature of these tattoos indicated a possibility this decedent may have served time in jail or a juvenile detention center in life.

Eyler specifically stated this murder had been committed in either mid- or late-May 1983, on a date he believed his alleged accomplice, Robert Little, had been on a sabbatical from his employment as a library science professor at the Indiana State University.

As with Adam, DNA was extracted from one of this decedent's bones in efforts to locate any individual who may be related to him whose DNA is contained within national public DNA databases. In April 2021, Brad was formally identified as a 19-year-old Kentucky native named John Brandenburg Jr., who had disappeared from Chicago in 1983. He was last seen by his family leaving their home to visit a friend.

=== Eyler's confession ===
In Eyler's posthumous confession to Brandenburg's murder he stated that, following a weekend of continual arguing with his lover, he had driven from his lover's home in Greenview, Illinois to Robert Little's Terre Haute residence, where he first encountered this victim. According to Eyler, Little confided to him he had "picked this guy up" at a location he did not divulge. He was unsure whether Brandenburg and Little had been previously acquainted, although he did observe the two had "seemed sort of familiar" with each other. Shortly thereafter, Little persuaded this individual to participate in a sexual act at the abandoned farmhouse where Eyler had earlier murdered Bartlett and Bauer upon the promise of being paid one-hundred dollars. According to Eyler, as the trio drove to this location, Little had informed this individual, "We're looking for something really far out".

At this location, the victim was blindfolded, handcuffed, and bound to a wooden post resembling a cross before Robert Little took several photographs as Eyler removed or adjusted several items of his clothing. According to Eyler, he had to struggle to remove Brandenburg's clothing as the young man "seemed to know something was wrong". He was then stabbed to death after Eyler—responding to an instruction from Little—had informed him, "Okay, make your peace with God, motherfucker."

Brandenburg's body was dismembered following his murder, with his head removed from the crime scene at Little's instruction after he informed Eyler he did not want Brandenburg's murder "connected to [him]." His head was later discarded in a dumpster close to Terre Haute.

== Investigation ==
=== Theories ===
Given the fact Eyler's identified victims lived in either Indiana or Illinois, investigators believed the two unidentified decedents were also likely native to the Midwestern United States. (Note: In addition to the twenty-one murders and one accessory after the fact murder to which Eyler posthumously confessed, he is suspected of having committed one further murder in Kentucky and one in Wisconsin.) Upon revealing the successful identifications of Brad and Adam, investigators discovered both teenagers had been Chicago residents, with the former born in Kentucky.

"I want to get them home. They don't belong here. They don't belong in my office. Somewhere out there is a mother or a father or a sister or a brother. They have to be missing these kids."

— Newton County coroner Scott McCord, describing his ongoing determination to identify the Newton County John Does (2010)

=== Facial reconstructions ===
Prior to their identification, several forensic facial reconstructions of Brandenburg and Bibbs's faces were generated by the National Center for Missing and Exploited Children. The facial reconstructions by the National Center for Missing and Exploited Children reportedly took approximately eighteen months to complete.

== Interment ==
In October 2016, a public funeral for Adam and Brad was held in Brook, Indiana. Both decedents—plus a further unidentified decedent known as Charlene Newton Doe whose death is unrelated to these cases—were interred inside of a mausoleum in Riverside Cemetery in Brook, Indiana.

One month after the April 2021 identification of John Brandenburg, his body was buried in Rest Haven Cemetery in Corbin, Kentucky. Bibbs's body was returned to his family in September 2023; his body was buried in Chicago's Mount Hope Cemetery.

== See also ==
- Cold case
- List of kidnappings
- List of murdered American children
- List of solved missing person cases: 1950–1999
- List of unsolved murders (1980–1999)
- National Center for Missing and Exploited Children
- The Doe Network
- Unidentified decedent

== Cited works and further reading ==
- Evans, Colin (1996). The Casebook of Forensic Detection: How Science Solved 100 of the World's Most Baffling Crimes. New York: John Wiley & Sons, Inc. ISBN 978-0-471-07650-6.
- Finkelhor, David; Sedlak, Andrea; Hotaling, Gerald T. (1990). Missing, Abducted, Runaway, and Thrownaway Children in America. New York: Officers of Juvenile Justice and Delinquency Prevention. ISBN 0-788-12651-2.
- Halber, Deborah (2015). The Skeleton Crew: How Amateur Sleuths Are Solving America's Coldest Cases. New York: Simon & Schuster. ISBN 978-1-451-65758-6.
- Kolarik, Gera-Lind; Klatt, Wayne (1990). Freed to Kill: The True Story of Serial Murderer Larry Eyler. Garrett County Press. ISBN 978-1-939-43000-7.
- Newton, Michael (2004). The Encyclopedia of Unsolved Crimes. New York: Facts on File. ISBN 978-0-816-07818-9.
- Newton, Michael (2006). The Encyclopedia of Serial Killers. Infobase Publishing. ISBN 0-816-06195-5.
- Pettem, Silvia (2013). Cold Case Research: Resources for Unidentified, Missing, and Cold Homicide Cases. Boca Raton: CRC Press. ISBN 978-1-466-57053-5.
- Taylor, Karen T. (2000). Forensic Art and Illustration. New York: CRC Press. ISBN 978-0-849-38118-8.
