= Anthony Allen Shore =

American serial killer and child molester

- TDCJ Inmate Photo
- Born: June 25, 1962; Rapid City, South Dakota, U.S.
- Died: January 18, 2018 (aged 55); Huntsville Unit, Texas, U.S.
- Other names: The Tourniquet Killer; The Strangler
- Status: Executed by lethal injection
- Convictions: Capital murder Drug possession Kidnapping; Sexual assault Indecency with a child (2 counts)
- Penalty: Death (November 15, 2004)

Details
- Victims: 4+
- Span of crimes: September 26, 1986 – July 6, 1995
- Country: United States
- State: Texas
- Date apprehended: October 24, 2003

Anthony Allen Shore (June 25, 1962 – January 18, 2018) was an American serial killer and child molester who was responsible for the murders of one woman and three girls. He was active from 1986 to 2000, and became known as the "Tourniquet Killer" because of his use of a ligature with either a toothbrush or bamboo stick to tighten or loosen the ligature. The instrument was similar to a garotte or a twitch, a tool used by farmers to control horses. Shore was sentenced to death in 2004, and executed by lethal injection on January 18, 2018.

== Early life ==
Shore was born in Rapid City, South Dakota, to Robert and Deanna Shore. His parents were both in the military, and the family, which grew to include Shore and two younger sisters Laurel and Gina, moved frequently; they eventually settled in Houston. Shore's parents fought constantly and engaged in extramarital affairs before finally divorcing in 1976. He later claimed that his father frequently beat him, and that his mother molested him when he was 13. He exhibited antisocial behavior from a young age, killing a neighbor's cat and harassing and molesting his female classmates and, sometimes, younger friends of his sisters.

In 1983, Shore married Gina Lynn Worley; Shore and Worley had two daughters, Amber and Tiffany. The couple divorced a decade later.

Shore married Amy Lynch in 1997; they divorced after she accused him of abuse. At his murder trial, Shore's daughters testified that their father drugged, abused, and raped them.

== Murders and assaults ==
=== Laurie Lee Tremblay ===
Shore's first known victim was 15-year-old Laurie Tremblay, whom he killed on September 26, 1986. Tremblay was walking to school when Shore attacked her. After attempting to sexually assault her, Shore strangled her. He dumped her behind a Mexican restaurant in Houston.

=== Maria del Carmen Estrada ===
Shore sexually assaulted and strangled Maria del Carmen Estrada, 21, on April 16, 1992. Estrada was a Mexican immigrant, working as a nanny. Estrada's body was found in the back of a Dairy Queen that same day.

=== Selma Janske ===
On October 19, 1993, Shore entered the home of 14-year-old Selma Janske, then bound and sexually assaulted her; he then fled the scene on foot.

=== Diana Rebollar ===
Shore beat, sexually assaulted, and strangled Diana Rebollar, 9, on August 8, 1994. She lived in the Houston Heights area of Houston, at the front of a small duplex. On the day of her death, she was seen at a local grocery store. Employees saw her leave the store safely, but she never returned home. She was found the next day on a loading dock behind a building. Police were given a lead by a neighbor who described a van that frequented the area. Her murder was connected to the Maria del Carmen Estrada case by the killer's modus operandi: a rope with a bamboo stick attached was found around her neck.

=== Dana Sanchez ===
Shore strangled Dana Sanchez, 16, on July 6, 1995. Shore offered her a ride in his van and killed her after she rejected his sexual advances. Seven days later an anonymous telephone call to a local news station, actually made by Shore, directed police to her body in a Harris County field.

== Investigation ==
In 1998, Shore pleaded guilty to molesting his two daughters and received probation. As a result, he was required to provide police with a DNA sample. In 2000, detectives pulled Maria del Carmen Estrada's case from the cold files, tested DNA evidence from underneath Estrada's fingernails, and received a full genetic profile. The results were not immediately matched to Shore because of problems at the lab. As a result of an audit, the lab was closed in 2002; however, certain samples, including those taken from Estrada's nails, were sent to another laboratory for retesting. The results were not matched until 2003, which led to Shore's arrest for Estrada's murder.

Eleven hours into his interrogation, Shore confessed to the murders of Maria del Carmen Estrada, Diana Rebollar, and Dana Sanchez. He also confessed to the 1986 murder of 15-year-old Laurie Tremblay and a 1994 rape of a 14-year-old girl. Detectives had no way of linking Tremblay's killing to the other three murders because she had been strangled with a ligature. When asked why he switched to a tourniquet, Shore replied, "because I hurt my finger while murdering Tremblay."

== Trial and conviction ==
Despite Shore's confession to the murders of the three girls, Estrada and the rape of 14-year old Selma Janske, prosecutor Kelly Siegler decided to charge Shore for only Estrada's murder because it contained the most forensic evidence. His trial began in late October 2004. The jury found Shore guilty of capital murder. During the sentencing phase, Shore's only surviving victim testified. After less than an hour of deliberations, the jury recommended that Shore be put to death, which Shore himself had asked for. He was sentenced to death on November 15, 2004.

Shore was nearly executed on October 18, 2017. However, it was called off six hours before it was scheduled to happen after Shore informed prison officials that he had been involved in a scheme with fellow death row inmate Larry Swearingen. Swearingen had pleaded with Shore to make a voluntary false confession to the rape and murder of Melissa Trotter, crime for which Swearingen was currently awaiting execution. Shore told investigators that he had refused to go along with the plan. His execution was reset for January 18.

== Execution ==
Shore was executed by lethal injection on January 18, 2018, at 6:28 p.m. (CST), and was the first person executed in the United States in 2018. He was 55 years old. Before the execution, Shore apologized to the families of his victims and confessed that "I made my peace". Prior to losing consciousness, he said, "Ooh-ee, I can feel that!"

== In media ==
Anthony Shore's daughter Tiffany gave interviews about her father and the abuse she and her sister went through. She was featured in many documentaries, including: Evil Lives Here, Mark of a Killer and Living with a Serial Killer.

== See also ==
- List of people executed in Texas, 2010–2019
- List of people executed in the United States in 2018
- List of serial killers in the United States

Executions carried out in Texas
| Preceded by Ruben Douglas Ramirez Cardenas November 8, 2017 | Anthony Allen Shore; January 18, 2018 | Succeeded by William Earl Rayford January 30, 2018 |
Executions carried out in the United States
| Preceded by Ruben Douglas Ramirez Cardenas – Texas November 8, 2017 | Anthony Allen Shore – Texas; January 18, 2018 | Succeeded by William Earl Rayford – Texas January 30, 2018 |
