= Paul Michael Stephani =

American serial killer

- Born: September 8, 1944; Austin, Minnesota, U.S.
- Died: June 12, 1998 (aged 53); Oak Park Heights Prison, Minnesota, U.S.
- Other name: The Weepy-Voiced Killer
- Conviction: 1 counts of attempted murder 1 counts of murder
- Penalty: 58 years in prison

Details
- Victims: 5 (3 murdered, 2 injured)
- Span of crimes: 1980–1982
- Country: United States
- States: Minnesota; Wisconsin
- Date apprehended: August 21, 1982

Paul Michael Stephani (September 8, 1944 – June 12, 1998) was an American serial killer. He was known as the Weepy-Voiced Killer due to a series of telephone calls he made to police, anonymously reporting his crimes in a remorseful and high-pitched voice. Stephani killed three women in the Minneapolis–Saint Paul area, and two other women survived Stephani's attacks.

== Background ==
Paul Stephani was the second of ten children born into a Catholic family. His mother remarried when he was three years old, giving him a stepfather who was known to beat his stepchildren and sometimes throw them down the stairs. Stephani was married to Beverly Lider and fathered a daughter with her, but the couple soon divorced.

He held down several jobs, but was fired from a janitor position at Malmberg Manufacturing Company in 1977. His first victim's body would be discovered near this building.

== Killings ==
On December 31, 1980, Stephani beat Karen Potack in Saint Paul, Minnesota, inflicting severe wounds and brain injury. Stephani himself called police at 3 a.m. to report the attack, directing police to a location where "There is a girl hurt there."

His next victim (and first murder victim) was Kimberly Compton, an 18-year-old student from Pepin, Wisconsin, on June 3, 1981, in neighboring Minneapolis. After killing her, he again contacted police pleading: "God damn, will you find me? I just stabbed somebody with an ice pick. I can't stop myself. I keep killing somebody." Two days later, he called police to say he was sorry for stabbing Compton and would turn himself in but did not. On June 6, he called to say newspaper accounts of some of the murders were inaccurate. His next call was on June 11. In a whimpering, barely coherent voice he cried: "I'm sorry for what I did to Compton."

His next victim was Kathleen Greening, who was found dead at her home just outside Saint Paul on July 21, 1982. Stephani later confessed to drowning her in her bathtub at her Roseville residence.

His fourth victim (and last murder victim) was Barbara Simons, a 40-year-old nurse on the Minneapolis side of the Mississippi River. The two met at the Hexagon Bar, after Stephani asked Simons for a cigarette, which she gave him. After spending the night at the bar with Stephani, Simons told a waitress, "He's cute. I hope he's nice, since he's giving me a ride home." Simons was found stabbed to death the next day. There were no calls after Greening's death, but the "Weepy-Voiced Killer" contacted police after the murder of Simons: "Please don't talk, just listen... I'm sorry I killed that girl. I stabbed her 40 times. Kimberly Compton was the first one over in Saint Paul."

== Capture ==
Stephani picked up a 19-year-old sex worker named Denise Williams on August 21, 1982, in Minneapolis. Williams sensed something was wrong when Stephani began driving through a dark, suburban area rather than returning her back to the city where he originally picked her up. After turning onto a dead-end road, he stabbed her fifteen times with a screwdriver. During the attack, Williams was able to hit Stephani on the head with a glass bottle, causing cuts to his head and face.

Her screams drew the attention of a man who lived nearby and upon seeing Stephani trying to stab Williams again began to wrestle with him, causing Stephani to flee the scene. The man was able to call for an ambulance and later help identify Stephani. However, when Stephani returned home to his apartment, he noticed he was bleeding badly and sought medical help. It was this call that confirmed Stephani was the "Weepy-Voiced Killer" and linked him to the Williams attack. Further investigative work later connected Stephani to the murder of Simons.

== Trial, confessions and death ==
During Stephani's trial in the Simons murder case, Stephani's ex-wife, sister, and a woman who lived with him testified that they believed the hysterical caller revealing the attacks was Stephani. These observations alone were not enough to identify Stephani as the Weepy-Voiced Killer since the hysterical crying distorted the voice. Stephani was convicted of the Simons murder and of the attempted murder of Williams and was sentenced to 58 years.

In 1997, Stephani was diagnosed with skin cancer and had less than a year to live. He decided to confess to the murders of Kim Compton, Barbara Simons, and Kathy Greening. He had not even been a suspect in the Greening murder, as he had not made a phone call to police as he had done in the other cases. In all, he confessed to a beating attack in 1980, stabbing Kimberly Compton to death in 1981, drowning Kathleen Greening in 1982, stabbing Barbara Simons to death in 1982, and stabbing Denise Williams in 1982. He died in prison in 1998 from skin cancer.

== Media ==
The case was covered by several television shows and documentaries. In an episode of the show World's Most Evil Killers (series 7, episode 10), the show Mark of a Killer in "Killer Caller" (episode 7), and in "Seeing Red" (season 1, episode 2) of Murder Calls on 15 January 2017.

Stephani's crimes were also covered on several True Crime podcasts and videos on social media platforms.

== See also ==
- List of serial killers in the United States
