= Gera-Lind Kolarik =

American journalist

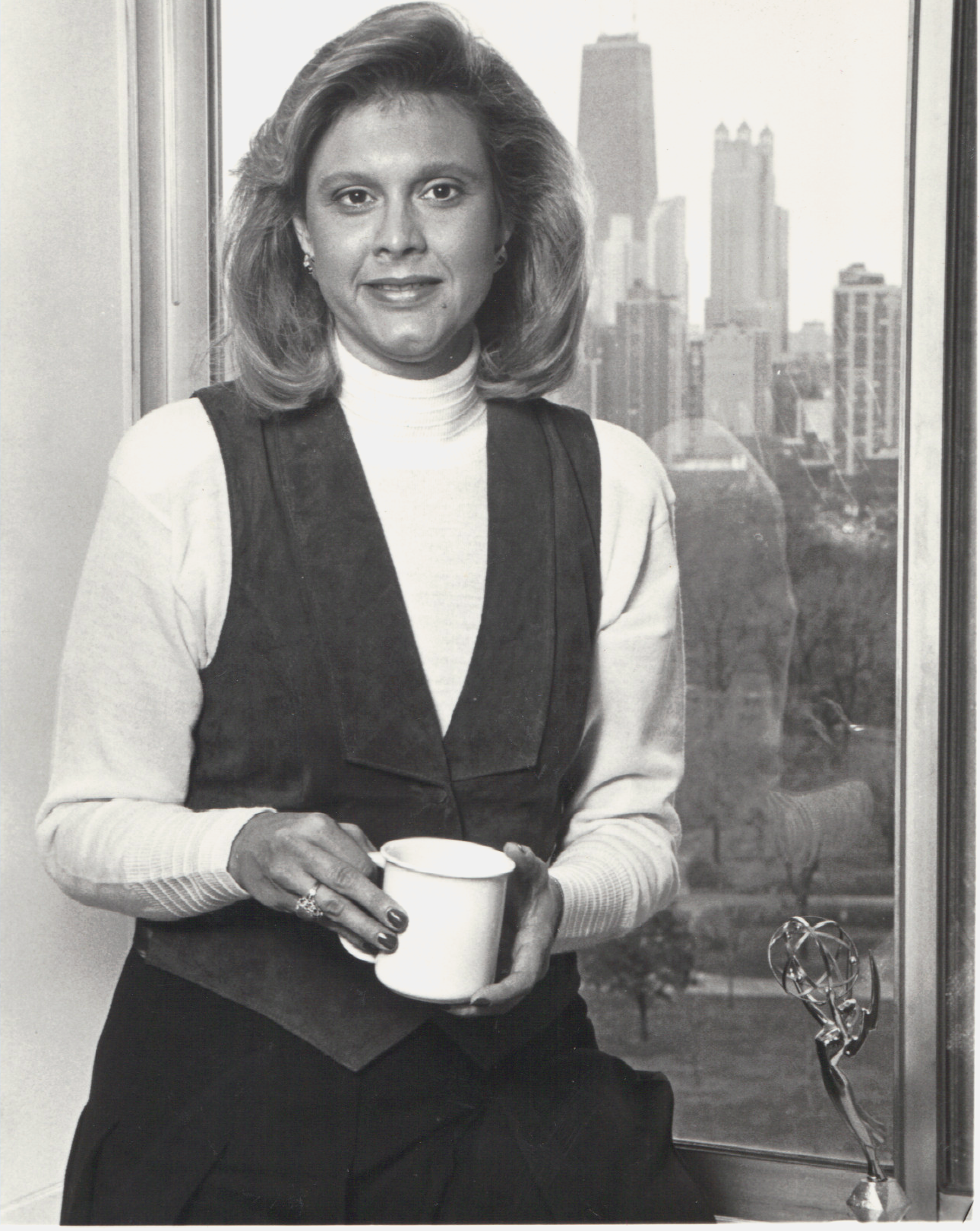
Gera-Lind Kolarik

Gera-Lind Kolarik is an American journalist, playwright and best selling author of true-crime books. Her work has been included television appearances on Maury Povich, Phil Donahue, 48 Hours, Inside Edition. Kolarik founded Evidence Video, a Chicago-based video production company that assists attorneys in personal injury and workers compensation cases.

== Biography ==
Kolarik was born to James, a factory worker, and Geraldine Kolarik, a homemaker. She grew up in the Chicago suburb of Berwyn, Illinois with her older sister Barbara Marie, an elementary school teacher. Kolarik graduated from Morton West High School where she was the feature editor of the school newspaper The Morton West Falcon. She attended and graduated from Rosary College (now Dominican University) in River Forest, Illinois with a BA in Communications and an Illinois secondary school teaching certificate.

According to Chicago publication, Skyline, "After graduating from Rosary College, Kolarik discovered her interest in crime when she covered the police and political beats for City News Bureau. On her first assignment, a bullet whizzed past her ear while chasing a fleeing bank robber. She keeps it as a good luck charm.

Since 1973, she has reported for several Chicago-area newspapers including the Chicago Tribune, World Newspaper, Oak Park and Life Newspapers of Berwyn and a freelance stringer for the Chicago Daily News. She later worked as an overnight assignment editor for WBBM-Channel 2, a producer for John Drummond's Chicago Chronicles, a weekly series featuring prominent Chicagoans and as the Chief Daytime Assignment Editor for WLS-TV. In 1984, while working as an assignment editor at WLS-TV, Kolarik won an Emmy Award for Best Spot News Coverage for the fatal shooting of Judge Henry Gentile. She also won two awards for Individual Excellence at the 26th Annual Chicago Emmy Award Presentation. She was also nominated for an Emmy Award for her coverage of serial killer Larry Eyler and for the five-part series, Playground Safety she produced with TV anchor Linda Yu.

Besides working as a TV journalist, Kolarik wrote a play and published three true crime books. In 1984, Kolarik wrote Shattered Dreams, a play about a fictional newsroom’s operations on Christmas based on Kolarik’s experiences as a reporter for the City News Bureau. It debuted on Christmas Day at the Chicago Press Club as a contribution for the organization’s scholarship fund. According to the Chicago Reader, Kolarik’s play, "explores the brutal psychic costs that sometimes accompany a lifetime in the news business."

Her first book, Freed to Kill, describes the locating and arresting of suspected serial murderer Larry Eyler, his release on a legal loophole, and his second arrest months later for another murder. Kolarik began following Eyler's case when he was first arrested in 1983. But it wasn't until the day he was convicted of murder in 1986 that she left her job at WLS-TV to research the Eyler case. It took Kolarik four years to complete the book which involved more than 200 interviews—with police officers, journalists, the families of victims, past sex partners of Larry Eyler, and even Sarah Dobrovolskis, the wife of Eyler's lover, John, who died of AIDS in January 1990 — as well as researching police records and archival material and visiting the crime scenes. The book, which alleged that Eyler was connected to several murders, resulted in the investigation being later reopened by Indiana police. According to the Chicago Daily Law Bulletin, "Despite all of the prosecutorial and police talent working full-time on these tortures and heinous murders, she was the first to spot a link between the Indiana and Illinois killings and to alert the Lake County sheriff to the multi-state pattern of the crimes." Freed to Kill is considered to be one of the factors in bringing charges against Eyler’s suspected accomplice, Robert Little, for assisting him in torturing and killing Steven Agan in 1982. Little was later acquitted of all charges. During the Eyler trial, Kolarik was featured as the cover story "Sleuth in a Skirt" in Inside Chicago's November/December 1990 issue. Freed to Kill reached the number seven spot on the Chicago Tribune's non-fiction list in 1990.

In 1994, Kolarik published I Am Cain about the 1990 murders of Winnetka, Illinois residents Nancy and Richard Langert, committed by a local teen. While researching the book, Kolarik hung out among Biro's acquaintances, in the juice bars, punk rock bars and schools. One of Biro's friends hit her and broke his fingers on her bulletproof vest.

Her most recent true-crime story, Prisoners of Fear, recounts the story of Connie Krauser Chaney, who was stalked and eventually murdered by her estranged husband Wayne Chaney who was then shot and killed by police the next day. through letters she had written to her family as well as excerpts of Wayne Chaney's depraved diary. Connie Chaney's murder compelled the State of Illinois to ratify one of the nation's first and toughest anti-stalking laws, the 1992 Illinois Stalking Law.

Ann Rule, American true-crime writer said, "Gera-Lind Kolarik gets better with every book! Prisoners of Fear is as chilling as today's tragic headlines about women who love the wrong men...searing...gripping...spellbinding...Read and beware." All three of Kolarik's books have been sold for movie options.

In 1988, she founded Evidence Video which produces day-in-the-life documentaries and depositions by witnesses. For one of the cases she worked on, which involved six children killed in a car crash, the trial tapes were shown on the "Today" show, as well as on local TV.

In 2012, digital (ebook) editions of Prisoners of Fear, I Am Cain and Freed to Kill were published. In 2015, audible versions of Prisoners of Fear and I Am Cain also became available.

== Philanthropy ==
Kolarik is active in programs that help Chicago-area students from low and middle income families and minority students to gain a better education. She sits on the Board of Directors for Queen of Peace High School, an all-girl Catholic school in Burbank, Illinois.

While visiting China, Kolarik met a university student studying Chinese Literature, Yanfei Hu. Kolarik decided to sponsor that student's pursuit of her MBA in the United States. Since then Kolarik has sponsored other Chinese students who want to study in the U.S.

== Books ==
- Freed to Kill, 1990
- I Am Cain, 1990
- Prisoners of Fear, 1995

== Articles ==
- (July 1997) ABA Journal, "News, A Different Outcome"
- (Mar 1997) ABA Journal, "A Psychological Payoff in O.J. Case"
- (Jan 1996) ABA Journal, "Developments, DNA, Changed Testimony"
- (Sept 1995) Ladies' Home Journal, Intent to Kill
- (May 1995) ABA Journal, "Fingerprints Exonerate Convict"
- (March 1995) Chicago Magazine, "Til Death Do Us Part"
- (Dec. 1994) ABA Journal, "Case Proves Senior Verdicts Can Be Large"
- (Jan. 1994) ABA Journal, "Judge Rules in Dangerous Client Suit"
- (May 18, 1993) Family Circle, "Stalking: Terror in the Shadows"

== Appearances ==
- October 2021 Mark of a Killer
- November 2015 48 Hours
- January 2015 Killer Kids
- November 1995 The Phil Donahue Show
- May 20, 1993 The Maury Povich Show
- February 1992 Inside Edition
- January 21, 1992 A Current Affair
- November 1990 Geraldo
