= Twitch (device) =

Device used to restrain horses in stressful situations

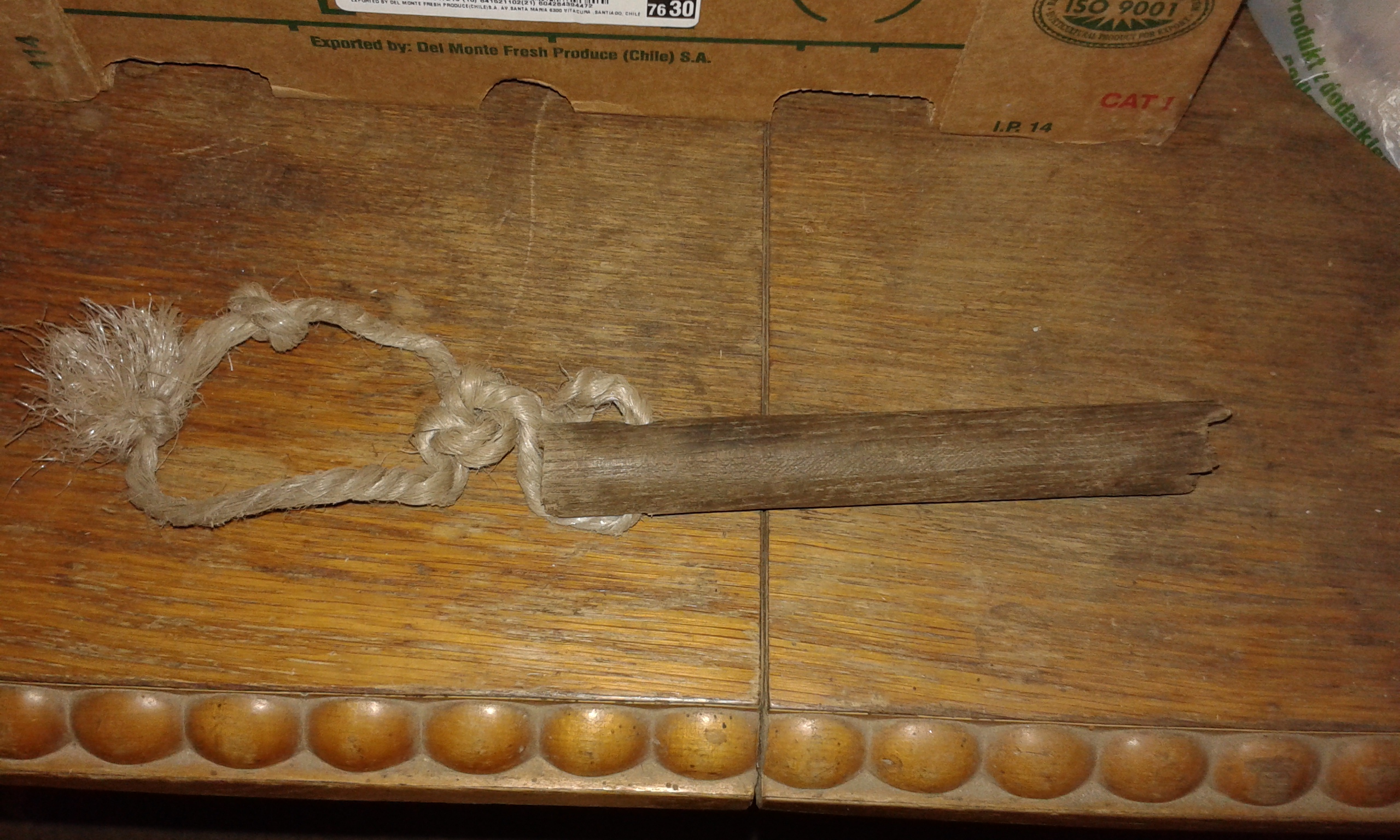
Simple horse twitch

A twitch is a device that is used to restrain horses during various stressful situations, such as veterinary treatment. It is usually made up of a stick-like handle loop of chain or rope on the end, or a metal ring with a rope loop which is wrapped around the upper lip of the horse and tightened. Another design, sometimes called a "humane" twitch, is a plier-like clamp that squeezes the lip with motion akin to that seen in a nutcracker. The aluminium screw twitch is yet another form of twitch.

== Use ==
The upper lip of the horse is grasped and the loop of chain or rope is placed around it, then the handle of the twitch is twisted until the loop is firmly around the lip. A wooden handled twitch has the disadvantage that it requires a handler and the handle may injure the horse handler if the horse throws its head. Other twitches may be attached to the halter or headcollar. An emergency twitch can be improvised by placing a loop of leather or heavy cord around the nose and tightening it by twisting a stick around and around until it is tightened sufficiently.

The twitch is popularly believed to work by distracting the horse, but may act instead by triggering the release of endorphins from the horse's brain, producing a calming effect. It is hypothesized that its effects are similar to acupuncture. The twitch is considered a humane method of restraint and is commonly used by horsemen and veterinarians to keep an animal still and quiet.

== Misuses ==
A twitch is not intended to replace proper pain management of the horse. It is not intended for use on any other part of the body of the horse other than the upper lip. It may cause permanent damage and behavioral issues if it is used—even correctly—such as a head-shy horse when used on the ear. Additionally, if a twitch is left on for an extended period of time, it can cause permanent damage.
