= David Schippers =

American lawyer

David Philip Schippers Jr. (November 4, 1929 – September 28, 2018) was an American lawyer from Chicago, Illinois. He received his bachelor's and law degrees from Loyola University Chicago. His most notable cases include prosecuting Sam Giancana, as well as being the chief investigative counsel during the Clinton impeachment trial.

He became a public figure when a friend of his, Congressman Henry Hyde, asked him to be the chief investigative counsel for the House Judiciary Committee. The committee was holding an inquiry into whether President Bill Clinton had committed impeachable offenses in his handling of the Paula Jones sexual harassment suit, during which he had committed perjury regarding his affair with then-White House intern Monica Lewinsky. Schippers was a lifelong Democrat but accepted and took the job in April 1998.

On December 10, 1998, Schippers said to the committee: "Indeed, how can anyone, in or out of our country, any longer believe anything Bill Clinton says? The President, then, has lied under oath in a civil deposition, lied under oath in a criminal grand jury. He lied to the people, he lied to his Cabinet, he lied to his top aides, and now he's lied under oath to the Congress of the United States. There's no one left to lie to."

This comment was the inspiration for the title to Christopher Hitchens' 1999 book about the Clintons titled No One Left to Lie To.

After an investigation, the committee voted in December 1998 to impeach Clinton, a decision supported by Schippers.

In early 1999, Schippers wrote Sellout: The Inside Story of President Clinton's Impeachment, a book which attacked the Clinton White House and portrayed some members of the Senate unfavorably.

Schippers died from pancreatic cancer at the age of 88 on September 28, 2018, at his home in Grayslake, Illinois.

== Bibliography ==
- David P. Schippers; with Alan P. Henry (2000). Sellout: The Inside Story of President Clinton's Impeachment (1st ed.). Regnery Publishing. ISBN 978-0-89526-243-1.
