= Charles Albright =

American killer from Dallas, Texas

- Mug shot
- Born: August 10, 1933; Amarillo, Texas, U.S.
- Died: August 22, 2020 (aged 87); Lubbock, Texas, U.S.
- Other names: The Dallas Ripper; The Dallas Slasher; The Eyeball Killer; The Texas Eyeball Killer
- Status: Deceased
- Convictions: Burglary; Forgery; Murder; Theft
- Penalty: Life imprisonment

Details
- Victims: 1 conviction, 3 more suspected
- Span of crimes: October 1988 – March 1991
- Country: United States
- State: Texas
- Date apprehended: March 22, 1991

Charles Frederick Albright (August 10, 1933 – August 22, 2020) was an American murderer and serial killer known as the Eyeball Killer. He was charged with the murders of four women (Rhonda Bowie, Mary Lou Pratt, Susan Peterson, and Shirley Williams) who were killed between 1988 and 1991 in Dallas, Texas. He was convicted of only one murder and charges in the other cases were dropped due to lack of evidence, although he is still considered the prime suspect. The nickname "Eyeball Killer" was adopted since some of the victims were found with their eyes removed. Albright was incarcerated in the John Montford Psychiatric Unit in Lubbock, Texas, until his death in 2020.

== Life history ==
=== Childhood ===
Charles Albright was born in Texas, on August 10, 1933. He was adopted from an orphanage by Delle and Fred Albright. His adoptive mother, a schoolteacher, was very strict and overprotective of him, accelerating his education and helped him skip two grades.

=== Adolescence ===
At age 13, he was already a petty thief and was arrested for aggravated assault. At age 15, he graduated from high school and enrolled at North Texas University. He expressed an interest in training as a medical doctor and a surgeon. He undertook pre-med training but failed to complete it. At age 16, the police caught him with stolen petty cash, two handguns, and a rifle. He spent a year in jail.

=== Adulthood ===
After his release from jail, he attended Arkansas State Teachers College and majored in pre-med studies. After being found with stolen items, he was expelled from the college but was not prosecuted.

He went on to falsify a degree. He stole documents and forged signatures, giving himself fictitious bachelor's and master's degrees. He married his college girlfriend, Bettye, and they had a daughter. He continued to forge checks and was caught in this deception while teaching at a high school and was placed on probation. In 1965, he and his wife separated, divorcing in 1974.

He was then caught stealing hundreds of dollars' worth of merchandise from a hardware store and received a two-year prison sentence. He served less than six months before being released.

During this time he began to befriend and gain the trust of his neighbors. He was even asked by local residents to babysit their children. One such child was Arnie States, who became a radio host and podcaster.

In 1981, while visiting some friends, he sexually molested their 9-year-old daughter. He was prosecuted, pled guilty, and received probation. He later said that he was innocent but had pled guilty to avoid "a hassle".

In 1984, he applied to be a leader in the Boy Scouts of America and was rejected.

In 1985 in Arkansas, Albright met a woman named Dixie and invited her to live with him. Soon she was paying his bills and supporting him. He delivered newspapers in the early morning, apparently to visit sex workers without arousing Dixie's suspicion.

=== Death ===
Sentenced to life without parole, Albright died at University Medical Center in Lubbock, Texas, in August 2020.

== Victims ==
=== Rhonda Bowie ===
Rhonda K. Bowie, 30, was a sex worker who operated around Oak Cliff. She was found dead in October 1988 and had been stabbed more than 20 times.

=== Mary Lou Pratt ===
Mary Lou Pratt, 33, a Caucasian well-known sex worker in the Oak Cliff neighborhood of Dallas, was found dead in December 1990, wearing only a t-shirt and bra. She had been shot in the back of the head with a .44 Magnum, as well as being badly beaten. The medical examiner reported that the killer had removed both of her eyes with surgical precision and had apparently taken them with him.

=== Susan Peterson ===
Susan Beth Peterson, 27, a Caucasian sex worker, was found on the same street as Mary Pratt, just outside the Dallas city limits near the DeSoto city limits in February 1991. She was nearly nude and had been shot three times: in the top of her head, in her left breast, and in the back of her head. The medical examiner found that her eyes had been removed as well. At this point, the investigators realized they were looking for a "repeater".

=== Shirley Williams ===
Shirley Williams, an African-American sex worker, was found dead, lying near an elementary school in March 1991. A waitress found Williams' nude body propped up against a curb. Her eyes had been removed, just like the previous two victims. She had facial bruises and a broken nose, and had been shot in the face and through the top of her head. A medical examiner's field agent pulled back her eyelids and discovered that her eyes were missing.

== Arrest and trial ==
On March 22, 1991, Albright was arrested on charges of murder after rookie police officer Regina Smith uncovered crucial evidence of his crimes. His trial began on December 13, 1991. The evidence was mostly circumstantial.

On December 18, 1991, the jury deliberated and found him guilty only of the murder of Shirley Williams.

During the trial a hair comparison expert testified hairs found at the Williams murder matched Albright's hair. Later DNA testing indicated the hairs were from a dog.

== Media ==
The May 1993 Texas Monthly magazine article, "See No Evil" asked the question 'How does a perfect gentleman become a vicious murderer?'

The Eyeball Killer was authored by John Matthews (the Dallas police officer who with his partner Regina Smith was instrumental in identifying Albright as the murderer) and newspaper journalist Christine Wicker.

The American documentary series Forensic Files documents the Albright case in the episode titled "See No Evil", originally aired June 14, 2001.

The Home Box Office (HBO) television network released Albright's story sub-titled "The Collector" on the Autopsy series under episode 5; "Autopsy 5: Dead Men Do Tell Tales", aired 1998.

The Investigation Discovery network reported the manhunt for Albright in the Evil, I episode "Eyes Are My Prize", which aired on August 27, 2013.

In 2015, the television series Born to Kill? aired an episode about Albright in series 7.

On October 20, 2016, the true crime podcast My Favorite Murder discussed the case on its 39th episode "Kind of Loco".

The Oxygen Network aired Mark of a Killer: An Eye for Murder about the case on February 10, 2019.

A feature film based on the Albright case called The Eyes of Jefferson went into pre-production in Dallas on January 11, 2022. The film was co-written by Preston Fassel and Jonathan Brownlee and will be directed by Brownlee, with John Matthews serving as an executive producer.

In 2024, Lifetime released a movie called Searching for a Serial Killer: The Regina Smith Story as part of its "Ripped from the Headlines" feature films. It stars Karrueche Tran as Regina Smith, Blair Penner as her partner Eddie, and Ted Cole as Charles Albright.

== See also ==
- List of serial killers in the United States
