= Paul Runge (serial killer) =

American serial killer

- Mugshot of Runge in 2001
- Born: Paul Frederick Runge; January 28, 1970 (age 56); Oak Forest, Illinois, U.S.
- Convictions: First degree murder (2 counts); Aggravated kidnapping Aggravated criminal sexual assault
- Penalty: Death; commuted to life imprisonment

Details
- Victims: 7–8+
- Span of crimes: January 3, 1995 – March 14, 1997
- Country: United States
- State: Illinois
- Imprisoned at: Pontiac Correctional Center

Paul Frederick Runge (born January 28, 1970) is an American serial killer, sex offender, and arsonist. He had been on parole for a rape he committed as a teenager when he murdered at least seven women and girls between 1995 and 1997 in northern Illinois. Initially sentenced to death, his sentence was commuted by Governor Pat Quinn in 2011, when capital punishment was abolished in the state.

== Early life and first conviction ==
Little is known about Runge's early life. He was born in Oak Forest, and since childhood has exhibited sexual sadism. This only worsened upon his mother's death, which occurred when he was 17.

Later that year, Runge kidnapped, raped and tortured a 14-year-old girl in Oak Forest, only to later turn himself in to the authorities. He was given a 14-year sentence for this crime, but was paroled in May 1994. During that time, he married a woman named Charlene, got a job as a shoe salesman and later a truck driver, and resettled in three different cities prior to his eventual rearrest in May 1997 for violating the conditions of the parole.

== Murders ==
When searching for a victim, Runge would cruise around the area and look for ways to acquaint himself with the potential victim. For some victims, he achieved this by pretending to be interested in a property that they were selling or renting and would ask if he could check the inside of the building. When he earned her trust, he would proceed to rape the victim before either strangling, slashing or beating her to death. In some instances, he disposed of the body by dismembering and dumping it in garbage cans, and in four cases, he burned the victim's home down.

=== Stacy Frobel ===
The first victim was an acquaintance of Runge's wife: 25-year-old Carol Stream, Illinois resident Stacy Frobel. On either January 3 or 4, 1995, Frobel had gone to visit Charlene in the couple's Streamwood home, but was never seen alive after that. Approximately two weeks later, on January 16, a German Shepherd named Friendly brought a severed leg to its owner's home, which it had found in a field near the border with southern Wisconsin. Five days later, the dog also found the other leg. DNA tests concluded that it was indeed Stacy Frobel, who was last seen entering the Runge household.

When she was inside the house, Runge had struck her with a dumbbell, killing Frobel on the spot. He then proceeded to place the body in the bathtub, where he dismembered her using a saw, before scattering the remains around northern Illinois and southern Wisconsin. For days after the murder, he called in sick at his job at Foot Locker, before eventually quitting.

=== Dženeta and Amela Pašanbegović ===
The Pašanbegović sisters (22 and 20, respectively) were Bosnian refugees who had come to live in the US with their uncle in Hanover Park, six months prior to their murders. They were last seen on July 11, 1995, when they were offered a house cleaning job by the Runges through a mutual acquaintance. At the time, the couple had moved to Glendale Heights, where Runge had begun work for a Honey Baked Ham store in the mall, while Charlene was planning to start a cleaning business.

It is presumed that they were enticed by Charlene into the house, where they were subsequently handcuffed, bludgeoned, raped, tortured, and strangled to death by Runge. In order to get rid of their bodies, he dismembered both sisters' corpses, placed the remains in plastic bags and discarded them in garbage bins. The day after he killed the sisters, Runge again called in sick, before quitting this job as well.

=== Dorota Dziubak ===
In January 1997, the 30-year-old Dziubak was raped and subsequently strangled in Chicago's Northwest Side. Runge came across her after responding to an ad for selling a house. Her burned body was later located by firefighters extinguishing a fire in her home.

=== Yolanda Gutierrez and Jessica Muniz ===
On February 3, 1997, Runge entered 35-year-old Gutierrez's Northwest Side apartment in response to a for-sale sign for some sport equipment. Inside, he bound both her and her 10-year-old daughter Jessica, raping and torturing them for hours on a bed. Eventually, Runge cut their throats and set their home on fire before escaping.

=== Kazimiera Paruch ===
Similarly to Dziubak, the 43-year-old Kazimiera Paruch encountered Runge when he expressed interest in buying her condominium in March 1997. She was also raped and strangled, with her burned body also found by firefighters after they extinguished a fire in her home.

== Investigation, trial and imprisonment ==
Between 1995 and early 1996, Chicago's FBI unit were searching for any possible evidence which could connect the Runges to the disappearances of Frobel and the Pasanbegovic sisters. To do this, they kept tabs on the couple, traced calls from payphones, wiretapped the phones and sifted through the garbage. On March 8, 1996, with the help of two other law enforcement agencies, the FBI conducted a search of the Runge household, which Paul Runge shared with his wife and his father, Richard Runge. More than 200 items were seized, including a book about Charles Albright, a guide to police radio traffic, a crossbow, a stun gun and a knife. Initially, they were not able to arrest him, but in May 1997, he was detained for possession of a weapon, a violation of his parole.

Runge in 2011

In 1999, as authorities were fighting in court to keep Runge in prison under the Sexually Violent Persons Act, citing his lack of remorse for the 1987 rape, DNA analysis linked him to the Gutierrez-Muniz murders. Runge then confessed to the other five slayings; however, he is suspected of being responsible for many more. He has confessed to killing a prostitute, whose body he later dismembered and disposed of and has been charged with three of the murders to which he had confessed. In 2000, while he was being driven to a Cook County court hearing, Runge overpowered the corrections officer with the help of two other inmates during a routine stop in Plainfield. However, the trio were quickly recaptured by local police.

In January 2006, Runge was convicted of the Gutierrez-Muniz murders and was sentenced to death. The prosecutors, who named him as the "face of the death penalty," expressed their hope that his case could help sway opinion in favor against the 2000 moratorium on the death penalty in the state. However, in 2011, capital punishment was abolished under Governor Pat Quinn, resulting in the commutation of Paul Runge's death sentence. Later in August, the DuPage County State's Attorney, Robert Berlin, decided to drop the charges against Runge concerning the Pasanbegovic sisters, citing that it would be a waste of time, as he had already been sentenced to the highest punishment available in the state.

== See also ==
- List of serial killers in the United States
