= List of American crime podcasts =

This is a list of American crime podcasts. True crime podcasts were popularized in the United States by Serial, which debuted in 2014.

== List ==
Podcast	Year	Topic/person covered	Host	Produced by	Ref
Atlanta Monster	2018–2020	Atlanta murders of 1979–1981	Payne Lindsey	HowStuffWorks, Tenderfoot TV	
Bear Brook	2018–present	The Allenstown Four and Sharon Johnson	Jason Moon	New Hampshire Public Radio	
The Coldest Case in Laramie	2023	1985 murder of Shelli Wiley in Laramie, Wyoming	Kim Barker	Serial Productions and The New York Times	
Crime Junkie	2017–present	Various	Ashley Flowers	Audiochuck	
Crime Writers On	2014–present	Various	Rebecca Lavoie, Kevin Flynn, Toby Ball, Lara Bricker.	Partners in Crime Media	
Crimetown	2016–2019	Organized crime	Marc Smerling, Zac Stuart-Pontier	Gimlet Media	
Criminal	2014–present	Various	Phoebe Judge	Radiotopia	
Culpable	2019	Christian Andreacchio	Dennis Cooper	Black Mountain Media, Tenderfoot TV, Resonate Recordings, Cadence13	
Darknet Diaries	2017–present	Internet crime, hackers, cryptocurrency	Jack Rhysider	Jack Rhysider	
Deathbed Confessions	2021- 2023	Deathbed confessions	Addison Nugent	Parcast	
Dateline NBC	2019–present	Various		NBC News	
Disappearances	2021- 2023	Disappearances	Sarah Turney	Parcast	
Disgraceland	2018-	Crimes involving musicians	Jake Brennan	Double Elvis Productions	
Dr. Death	2018–present	Christopher Duntsch, Farid Fata, Paolo Macchiarini	Laura Beil	Wondery	
Ear Hustle	2017–present	San Quentin State Prison	Earlonne Woods and Nigel Poor	Radiotopia	
Gangster Capitalism	2019–present	2019 college admissions bribery scandal	Andrew Jenks	Cadence13	
Generation Why	2012–present	Various	Aaron, Justin	Wondery	
Heaven's Gate	2017	Heaven's Gate cult	Glynn Washington	Stitcher	
In the Dark	2016–2020	Jacob Wetterling, Curtis Flowers	Madeleine Baran	American Public Media	
Jensen & Holes: The Murder Squad	2019–2022	Cold cases	Paul Holes, Billy Jensen	Exactly Right	
Killer Role	2021	Wyn Reed	Keith Morrison	NBC News	
The Last Podcast on the Left	2011–present	Various	Ed Larson, Ben Kissel, Marcus Parks, Henry Zebrowski	The Last Podcast Network	
Mommy Doomsday	2021	Lori Vallow	Keith Morrison	NBC News	
Monster: The Zodiac Killer	2019–2020	Zodiac Killer	Payne Lindsey	iHeartRadio, Tenderfoot TV	
Monster: DC Sniper	2019–2020	DC Sniper	Tony Harris	iHeartRadio, Tenderfoot TV	
Morbid: A True Crime Podcast	2018–present	Various	Ash Kelley, Alaina Urquhart	True Crime	
Motive	2019– 2023		Frank Main	Chicago Sun-Times and WBEZ	
My Favorite Murder	2016–present	Various	Karen Kilgariff, Georgia Hardstark	Exactly Right	
No Place Like Home	2021	Judy Garland Museum ruby slipper heist of 2005	Seyward Darby, Ariel Ramchandani	Cadence13	
Over My Dead Body	2019–2020	Dan Markel, Joe Exotic	Matthew Shaer, Robert Moor	Wondery	
Room 20	2019	Omar Salgado	Joanne Faryon	Wondery, Los Angeles Times, Neon Hum Media	
Root of Evil: The True Story of the Hodel Family and the Black Dahlia	2019	Black Dahlia	Yvette Gentile, Rasha Pecoraro	Cadence13, TNT	
S-Town	2017	John B. McLemore	Brian Reed	Serial Productions	
Serial	2014–2021	Various	Sarah Koenig	Serial Productions	
Somebody	2020	Courtney Copeland	Shapearl Wells	iHeartRadio, Tenderfoot TV, The Intercept	
The Shrink Next Door	2019–2021	Isaac Herschkopf	Joe Nocera	Wondery	
Tell Me The Crime	2026–present	Various	Febriana Grundy and John Grundy	J&F Productions	
The Thing About Pam	2019–2021	Pam Hupp, Betsy Faria, Shirley Mae Neumann, Louis Gumpenberger	Keith Morrison	Dateline NBC	
The Trials of Frank Carson	2021	Frank Carson	Christopher Goffard	Los Angeles Times	
The Vanished	2016–present	Missing-persons cases	Marissa Jones	Wondery	
This Land	2019– 2023	Sharp v. Murphy	Rebecca Nagle	Crooked Media	
To Live and Die in L.A.	2019– 2023	Adea Shabani, Elaine Park	Neil Strauss	Cadence13	
Trust Me	2020–present	Cults, extreme belief, and the abuse of power	Lola Blanc, Meagan Elizabeth	PodcastOne	
Up and Vanished	2016–present	Various	Payne Lindsey	Cadence13	
Wine & Crime	2017–present	General	Lucy Fitzgerald, Kenyon Laing, Amanda Jacobson	Wine & Crime	

== See also ==
- List of Australian crime podcasts
