= Ghostwriter (disambiguation) =

A ghostwriter is a person who writes under someone else's name with their consent. Celebrities often employ ghostwriters to produce autobiographies.

Ghost Writer, Ghostwriter or Ghostwritten may also refer to:

== Films ==
- The Ghost Writer (film), a 2010 Franco-German-British political thriller film
- Suffering Man's Charity, also called Ghost Writer, a 2007 comedy/horror film directed by Alan Cumming

== Literature ==
- Ghostwriter (book series), a book series based on the American children's mystery television series
- The Ghost Writer, a 1979 novel by American author Philip Roth
- Ghostwritten (novel), a 1999 novel by American author David Mitchell

== Music ==
- Ghost Writer (album), the second solo album by Garland Jeffreys
- "Ghostwriter", a tell-all single by rapper Skillz
- "Ghostwriter", the sixth track from RJD2's 2002 album Deadringer
- Ghostwriters (band), an Australian rock band
- Ghostwriter977, songwriter of "Heart on My Sleeve"

== Television ==
- Ghost Writer (Hong Kong TV series), a 2010 Hong Kong television series produced by TVB
- Ghost Writer (Japanese TV series), a 2015 Japanese television drama
- Ghostwriter (1992 TV series), a 1992–1995 American children's mystery television series that was broadcast on PBS
  - Ghostwriter (2019 TV series), a 2019 American children's mystery television series from Apple TV+ that serves as a reboot to the 1992 series of the same name
- "Ghost Writer", an episode of The Ghosts of Motley Hall
- "Ghost Writer" (Magnum, P.I.), a 1981 television episode

== Others ==
- Ghostwriter (hacker group)
- Ghostwriter, a paid generative AI service released by Replit
- Ghostwriter, Text editor open source for Markdown
- Ghostwriter (podcast), 2021 podcast from Cadence13

== See also ==
- Ghostwritten (novel), the first novel published by English author David Mitchell
- Ghost developer, a development studio that is not credited for a video game
- Ghost producer, a music producer who is not credited for a track
