= Kathleen Zellner =

American lawyer

Kathleen T. Zellner
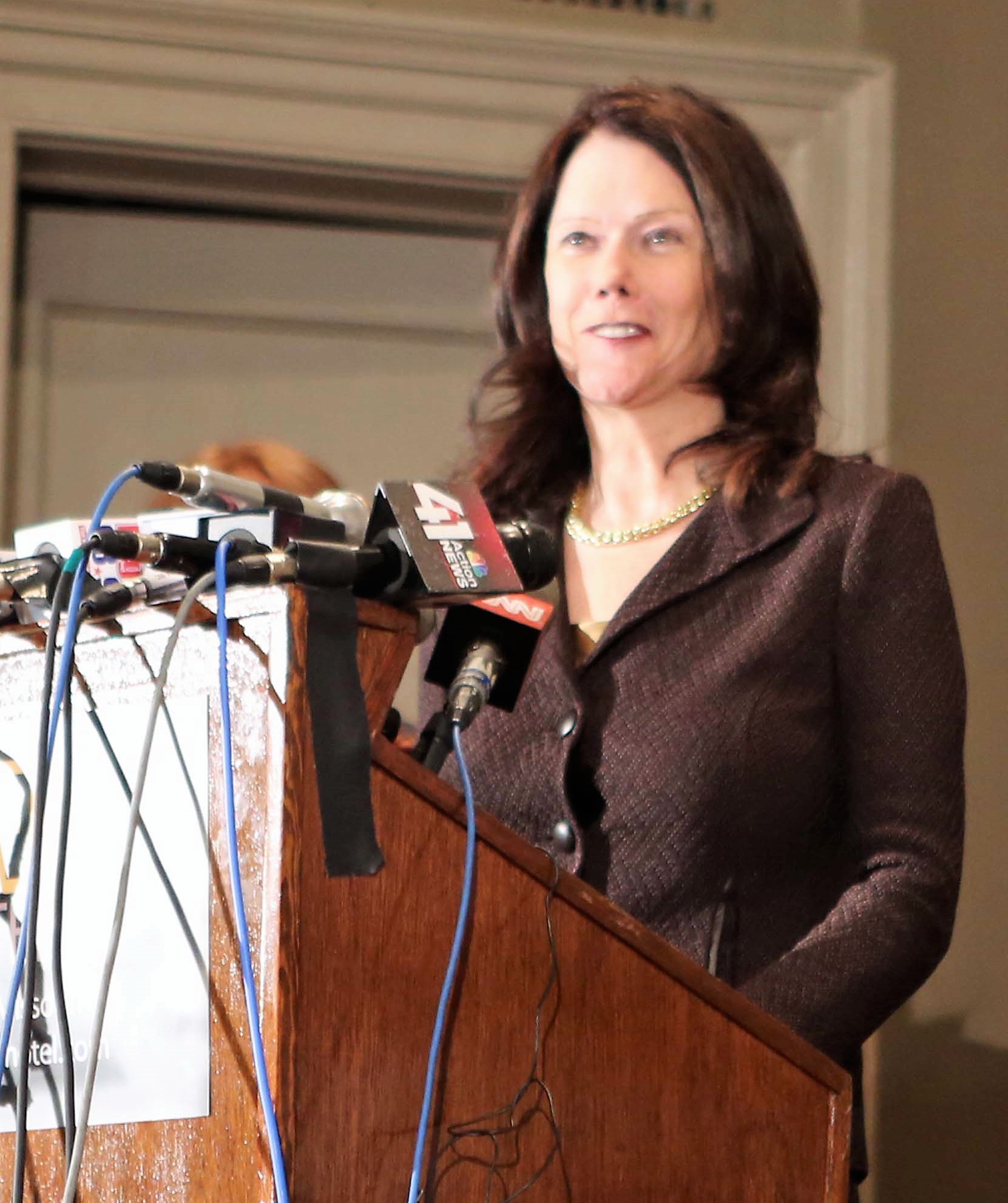
- Born: May 7, 1949 (age 77); Midland, Texas
- Education: Concordia University (BA); Northern Illinois University (JD)
- Occupation: Attorney
- Known for: Wrongful conviction advocacy and civil litigation verdicts
- Spouse: Robert Zellner
- Website: kathleentzellner.com

Kathleen Zellner is an American attorney who has worked extensively in wrongful conviction advocacy. Notable clients Zellner has represented include Steven Avery (who was the subject of the 2015 and 2018 Netflix series Making a Murderer), Kevin Fox (who was falsely accused of murdering his daughter), Ryan W. Ferguson, Larry Eyler, and 19 exonerees who are listed in the National Registry of Exonerations.

== Early life and education ==
Kathleen Zellner was born in Midland, Texas, on May 7, 1949, the second of seven children. Her father Owen Thomas was a geologist, and her mother Winifred was a chemist who became a nurse. When she was nine years old, she and her family moved to Bartlesville, Oklahoma.

She attended Marquette University in Wisconsin, and then the University of Missouri, before graduating with a B.A. from Concordia University in Montreal, Canada. She received her Juris Doctor from the Northern Illinois University College of Law in 1981, where she was Editor-in-Chief of the Law Review, and clerked for 2nd District Illinois Appellate Court justice George W. Lindberg.

== Career ==
She opened her firm, Kathleen T. Zellner & Associates in Downers Grove, Illinois, in 1991. Her firm handles wrongful conviction cases, civil rights violations, medical malpractice, and prisoner abuse cases. Zellner had achieved 19 exonerations as of October 2018, and now 20 exonerations for clients.

Notable clients Zellner has represented include Steven Avery (who was the subject of the 2015 and 2018 Netflix series Making a Murderer), Kevin Fox (who was falsely accused of murdering his three-year-old daughter), and 19 exonerees who are listed in the National Registry of Exonerations. Newsweek reported that a lawyer said that facing her at trial was "worse than my divorce."

As of March 2016, she had won almost $90 million from wrongful conviction and medical malpractice lawsuits. In 2000, The National Law Journal named Zellner a top ten trial lawyer in the United States for a suicide malpractice verdict of $13 million. She also won a $15.5 million verdict for the violation of Kevin Fox's civil rights in 2007, an $11 million verdict for Ryan W. Ferguson in Missouri who had served 10 years in jail, and a $9 million civil rights verdict for Ray Spencer in Washington in 2014. In 2012, she won the American Bar Association "Pursuit of Justice" Award.

In 2022, Zellner served as a consultant to Johnny Depp on the Depp vs Heard defamation trial.

== Personal life ==
Her husband Robert Zellner is a commodities and bond trader with a doctorate in economics. They have a daughter, Anne, who is also an attorney.

== Filmography ==
Film
Year	Film	Role	Director
2015	dream/killer	Herself (Ryan Ferguson's attorney)	Andrew Jenks

Television
Year	Show	Role	Notes
2013-2014	48 Hours	Herself (Ryan Ferguson's attorney)	season 26, episode 19
2014-2016	20/20	Herself (Attorney)	2 episodes
2016	Dateline NBC	Herself (Ryan Ferguson's attorney)	season 24, episode 22
2017	I, Witness	Herself	season 1, episode 3
2018	Making a Murderer	Herself (Steven Avery's post-conviction attorney)	season 2, 10 episodes
2021	20/20	Herself (Kevin Fox's attorney)	season 43, episode 24: "The Accused"
2025	48 Hours	Herself (Melissa Calusinski's attorney)	season 38, episode 15: "Unraveling the Case Against Melissa"
