= Dreamkiller =

Dreamkiller may refer to:

== Films ==
- Dreamkiller (film), 2010 American film
- Dream/Killer, 2015 documentary film

== Video game ==
- Dreamkiller (video game), 2009 dark fantasy first-person shooter
