= To Live and Die in L.A. (podcast) =

True crime podcast

- Genre: Investigative journalism; True crime
- Language: English

Cast and voices
- Hosted by: Neil Strauss

Music
- Theme music composed by: Makeup & Vanity Set

Production
- Production: Cadence13; Tenderfoot TV; Alex Vespestad

Technical specifications
- Audio format: Podcast (via streaming or downloadable MP3)

Publication
- No. of seasons: 2
- No. of episodes: 20 (plus bonus episodes)
- Provider: Cadence13
- Updates: Weekly

Related
- Website: livediela.com

To Live and Die in L.A. is an investigative and true crime podcast hosted by American journalist Neil Strauss, and produced by Tenderfoot TV and Cadence13. Season 1 of the podcast follows the disappearance and death of aspiring Albanian Macedonian actress Adea Shabani, who was last seen alive leaving her Hollywood apartment with her boyfriend, Chris Spotz. Strauss works alongside private investigator Jayden Brant and producer Alex Vespestad to uncover the truth. In season 2, the focus shifts to the disappearance of California native Elaine Park, who went missing in 2017. Strauss again teams up with Brant, plus Incubus guitarist Michael Einziger, concert violinist Ann Marie Simpson, and Strauss's then-wife and author Ingrid De La O, who first introduced Strauss to Park's case.

== History ==
Days after she went missing, Shabani's family asked Strauss, a journalist for Rolling Stone who lives in Los Angeles, if he would write an article covering the case that could draw attention to her disappearance. Throughout his research, Strauss uncovered several suspects and determined that one story would not be enough to express the details of the case, which led him to creating the podcast. While Strauss was investigating Shabani’s case, he was also investigating Park’s disappearance, which predates the disappearance of Shabani by about a year.

== Episodes ==
No.	Title	Length (minutes:seconds)	Original release date
1	"A Different Kind of Star"	31:03	February 28, 2019
When a 25-year-old aspiring actress and model vanishes from outside her Hollywood apartment, award-winning journalist and bestselling author Neil Strauss finds himself at the center of the investigation. What happened to Adea Shabani?
2	"The Secret Life"	26:53	February 28, 2019
Neil chases down the first big break in Adea’s recent disappearance, but new information produces more questions than answers as several suspects emerge. A secret relationship is revealed.
3	"Three Sides to Every Story"	34:45	March 5, 2019
Security video surfaces from the day of Adea’s disappearance. Neil and Jayden begin to pursue the suspect from state to state.
4	"Toxic Love"	29:50	March 7, 2019
Neil finds the apartment where the main suspect is believed to be staying, and prepares for a confrontation. New information surfaces, including a very disturbing video, making it possible to reconstruct the nightmarish weeks prior to Adea’s disappearance.
5	"Holy S#%T"	40:03	March 14, 2019
Everything changes after an unexpected turn of events. At a loss for words, only two come to mind…
6	"The Way of the Warrior"	34:24	March 21, 2019
A new witness emerges…with a shocking accusation.
7	"Family Ties"	38:27	March 29, 2019
Neil begins to see this case from another perspective as a new theory emerges.
8	"Adea"	35:05	April 5, 2019
One big break is interrupted by another. The LAPD break their silence.
9	"Hello, I've Been Watching You"	41:18	April 18, 2019
Neil travels to Fort Morgan, Colorado, to attend the funeral, and discovers skeletons (and warrants) in the closet.
10	"Blood on the Script"	48:31	May 2, 2019
Neil and Jayden uncover inconsistencies as they examine the bullet-riddled truck. Based on Google data, they retrace what could have been Adea’s last day step by step.
11	"The Long Way Home"	60:58	May 10, 2019
Neil and Jayden follow the trail of evidence all the way to the burial site…and a new suspect emerges.
12	"Look at the Stars - Season Finale"	69:06	May 17, 2019
In the season finale, Neil uncovers definitive answers. After more than a year investigating Adea’s disappearance and murder, the truth will come out, but justice is in the hands of LAPD.

No.	Title	Length (minutes:seconds)	Original Air Date
1	"Meet Elaine"	38:59	May 27, 2021
2	"I Hope I Don't Die Tonight"	49:53	June 3, 2021
3	"Fragments of a Crime"	36:02	June 10, 2021
4	"The Other Ex"	33:19	June 17, 2021
5	"Die, Die, Die"	29:52	June 24, 2021
6	"Broken Home"	37:48	July 2, 2021
7	"Cadaver Dogs"	37:56	July 9, 2021
8	"A Job for the Police"	32:26	July 16, 2021
9	"Contradictions and Coincidences"	42:10	July 31, 2021
BONUS	"Origins [Bonus 1]"	40:45	August 5, 2021
10	"$250,000 in Cash"	32:06	August 13, 2021
11	"The Last 12 Hours"	45:49	August 27, 2021
12	"Season Finale, Part 1"	1:01:05	September 4, 2021
13	"Season Finale, Part 2"	55:01	September 11, 2021

== See also ==
- List of American crime podcasts
