= Treat (podcast) =

Horror podcast

Treat is a horror podcast starring Kiernan Shipka produced by Cadence13.

== Background ==
The podcast is a single episode and is 90 minutes long. The show is a supernatural thriller and horror podcast starring Kiernan Shipka. The podcast was recorded over the course of 5 days in a New York City studio. The podcast was produced by Cadence13. The protagonist of the show is named Allie West. The show is written by Nathan Ballingrud, Babak Anvari, and Lucan Toh. The show was released on October 25, 2021. The story is about an American town that makes a deal with a stranger that has supernatural powers and they fall behind on their payments.

== Cast ==
- Bill Lobley
- Christa Scott-Reed
- David Shih
- Kiernan Shipka
- Kyle Beltran
- Marc Menchaca
- Marin Ireland
- Noah Robbins
- Peggy J. Scott
- Renata Friedman
- Ryan Buggle
- Sara Echeagaray
- Wayne Knight

== Reception ==
The show was nominated for Best Fiction Podcast at the 2022 Ambies Awards.
