= Comments by Celebs =

Media company and podcast

- Genre: pop culture, comedy
- Language: English

Cast and voices
- Hosted by: Emma Diamond and Julie Kramer

Technical specifications
- Audio format: Podcast

Publication
- No. of episodes: 45
- Original release: 10 July 2018
- Provider: Cadence13
- Updates: Weekly

Related
- Website: commentsbycelebs.com

Comments by Celebs, or CBC, is a brand consisting of several social media accounts and a weekly podcast created by Emma Diamond and Julie Kramer that focuses on pop culture and entertainment news. The brand curates a collection of social media interactions between celebrities, emphasizing lighthearted interactions while trying to humanize celebrities. The account gained popularity through Instagram, although they also have Twitter, and Facebook accounts.

== Background ==
Comments by Celebs was founded in April 2017. At the time, Instagram had recently changed its algorithm so that comments from verified accounts were visible first. This led Kramer and Diamond to create an Instagram account featuring a variety of comments and social media interactions between celebrities. Comments by Celebs' popularity grew after Kelly Ripa mentioned the account on the air on her show Live with Kelly and Ryan. In early 2018, they also added a watermark to their posts, which they claim helped to grow the account. The company is based in New York City.

Their account has also become a source of entertainment news due to the fact that they capture and instantly release information about which celebrities are interacting with one another. Because of this, they have built relationships with several entertainment reporters and celebrities, and many gossip bloggers have featured work from the accounts. To maintain positive relationships with celebrities, they request permission to post comments that may be considered questionable. As a result of the popularity, they started various spinoff accounts with the handles @CommentsByBravo, @CommentsByBachelor, @CommentsByAthletes, @CommentsByInfluencers, and @CommentsByTikTok. While Kramer and Diamond run most of the accounts themselves, they hired someone to run @CommentsbyAthletes.

As a result of the popularity, they started various spinoff accounts with the handles @CommentsByBravo, @CommentsByBachelor, @CommentsByAthletes, @CommentsByInfluencers, and @CommentsByTikTok.

Diamond and Kramer are alumnae of Syracuse University, where they met and were in the same sorority. They bonded through a group chat which discussed Keeping Up with the Kardashians. Diamond holds a bachelor's degree in communications and rhetorical studies, while Kramer holds a Bachelors in psychology. At the time the account started, Diamond was pursuing a Masters in Social Work at Columbia University and Kramer was also planning on attending graduate school, but after the account's popularity grew, they deferred to pursue Comments by Celebs full-time. Both women are Jewish. In 2019, they hired sorority sister and friend Isabel Greenberg to join as a partner and third member of the team.

Comments by Celebs was named as an honoree in the 2019 Webby Awards.

In 2020, they launched a line of merchandise at shop.commentsbycelebs.com and partnered with @OverheardLA to launch @OverheardCelebs.

== Podcast ==
Diamond and Kramer's podcast began in July 2018 as a partnership with Betches, with their first episode airing on 10 July 2018, and featuring Kelly Ripa as a guest host. Other celebrity guests have included occasional celebrity guest hosts have included Katie Couric, Lisa Rinna, and Gary Janetti. In January 2019 they left Betches and partnered with Cadence13.

=== Kardashian Bonus Show ===
In February 2019, they started releasing weekly bonus podcast episodes which focus on the stars of Keeping Up With the Kardashians. The episodes discuss Kardashian news, scandals, and past and current episodes of the reality show. They covered the Jordyn Woods and Tristan Thompson scandal on the podcast through a series of episodes which they named "JORDYNGATE" and which began trending on the Apple podcast app.

=== Comments By Bravo episodes ===
In 2020, they launched the "Comments By Bravo" podcast, which highlights all things Bravo and Real Housewives, hosted by Emma Diamond and CBC's partner and Director of Communications, Isabel Greenberg. Guests have included Lisa Vanderpump, Meredith Marks, Carl Radke, Eboni Williams, Paige DeSorbo, Brooks Marks, and Hannah Berner.

== List of episodes ==
=== Main episodes ===
No.	Title	Length (minutes:seconds)	Original release date
0	"Teaser Episode: The Dinner Party Game"	14:44	9 July 2018
1	"The Kickoff Episode of Our Dreams Ft. Kelly Ripa"	66:42	10 July 2018
2	"Our Second Episode: Is Kris Jenner on to us?"	41:29	17 July 2018
3	"If Meryl Streep Was a Water Bottle"	54:17	24 July 2018
4	"Lindsay Lohan Should Be On Top Again Ft. Lisa Rinna"	39:22	31 July 2018
5	"What Can't Beyoncé Do? Ft. Betches Co-Founder Sami Fishbein"	57:45	6 August 2018
6	"Scoot Find ME A Husband Ft. Betches Co-Founder Aleen Kuperman"	53:45	13 August 2018
7	"Did You Even Go To The Hamptons If You Didn't Run Into Alec Baldwin"	41:52	20 August 2018
8	"Andy Cohen Is Living His Best Life ft. Daryn Carp"	63:57	27 August 2018
9	"The Sequel Is Never As Good As The Original"	42:31	4 September 2018
10	"Dad, We're About To Break A Story"	57:04	11 September 2018
11	"Our First Fight: The SJP Comment Gone Wrong"	64:28	18 September 2018
12	"No One Puts Gary In A Roundup ft. Gary Janetti"	71:46	25 September 2018
13	"Nobody Does It Like Chrissy ft. Jenny Mollen"	75:03	2 October 2018
14	"Move Over, John Legend, There's A New King In Town"	41:04	9 October 2018
15	"We Want A Jennifer Lawrence Round Up"	42:19	17 October 2018
16	"Triple Clang ft. The Foster Sisters"	88:32	22 October 2018
17	"Come Back To Us, Mindy"	39:18	31 October 2018
18	"The Power Of The Blue Check ft. Nikki Glaser"	70:30	7 November 2018
19	"Back in the New York Groove"	49:01	14 November 2018
20	"2019: The Year of Paris Hilton"	42:39	21 November 2018
21	"From Baldwin to Bieber"	55:29	27 November 2018
22	"An Ode To Jeff Leatham"	74:11	5 December 2018
23	"1, 2, 3 .. GO"	1:02:56	12 December 2018
24	"Ain't That The Damn Truth"	46:36	17 December 2018
25	"David Dobrik Can Get It"	TBA	24 December 2018
26	"Facetuned to the Gods ft. Simon Huck"	TBA	8 January 2019
27	"Egg vs. Kylie"	TBA	15 January 2019
28	"The Things We Do For Water"	40:02	22 January 2019
29	"The Palm Will Never Be The Same"	TBA	29 January 2019
30	"Bounty, The Quicker Picker Upper"	1:03:52	5 February 2019
31	"It's A Stormi World After All"	52:39	12 February 2019
32	"Kardashian Bonus Show #1: Mindy Weiss 2020"	25:42	14 February 2019
33	"A Heart to Heart with Katie Couric"	114:50	19 February 2019
34	"Kardashian Bonus Show #2: JORDYNGATE"	51:15	20 February 2019
35	"Kardashian Bonus Show #3: JORDYNGATE PART 2"	58:37	25 February 2019
36	"Backstage at the Oscars"	45:07	26 February 2019
37	"Kardashian Bonus Show #4: JORDYNGATE PART 3"	58:56	4 March 2019
38	"This Just In: The Jonas Brothers Have Sex"	43:29	5 March 2019
39	"Johnny Weir Could Do Tricks On That Ring ft. Jill Kargman"	57:23	12 March 2019
40	"Kardashian Bonus Show #5: A Walk Down Memory Lane"	33:39	14 March 2019
41	"Thanksgiving With The Bezoses"	49:42	19 March 2019
42	"Kardashian Bonus Show #6: A Break Down of Rob Kardashian"	32:54	21 March 2019
43	"From Your Lips to Moses' Ears Ft. Justin Sylvester"	70:42	26 March 2019
44	"Kardashian Bonus Show #7: The History of Kardashian Feuds"	52:56	28 March 2019
45	"Nothing Gets Us Going Like A Hyphen"	55:29	4 April 2019
46	"Kardashian Bonus Show #8:Chivalry is Alive, and it's called Scott Disick"	42:53	4 April 2019
47	"Kardashian Bonus Show #9: Once a Lord, Always a Lord"	53:05	8 April 2019
48	"It's Ms. Winfrey To You"	47:28	4 April 2019

==== Kardashian bonus episodes ====
No.	Title	Length (minutes:seconds)	Original release date
1	"Mindy Weiss 2020"	25:42	14 February 2019
2	"JORDYNGATE"	51:15	20 February 2019
3	"JORDYNGATE PART 2"	58:37	25 February 2019
4	"JORDYNGATE PART 3"	58:56	4 March 2019
5	"A Walk Down Memory Lane"	33:39	14 March 2019
6	"A Break Down of Rob Kardashian"	32:54	21 March 2019
7	"The History of Kardashian Feuds"	52:56	28 March 2019
8	"Chivalry is Alive, and it's called Scott Disick"	42:53	4 April 2019
9	"Once a Lord, Always a Lord"	53:05	8 April 2019
10	TBA	TBA	2019

==== Bravo bonus episodes ====
No.	Title	Length (minutes:seconds)	Original release date
–	"Bravo Bonus Ep: It's Not About The Pasta ft. Jerry O'Connell"	68:18	24 September 2018
–	"Bravo Bonus Episode ft. Margaret Josephs"	TBA	8 November 2018
