= Ghostwriter (podcast) =

Fiction podcast

Ghostwriter is a fiction podcast by Cadence13.

== Background ==
The show debuted on December 6, 2021. The show is an 80 minute single episode. The show stars Kate Mara and Adam Scott. The show was directed by Kimberly Senior. The show was written by Alix Sobler. The show was produced by Cadence13's C13Features in partnership with Best Case Studios. The show is C13Features second podcast movie after the release of Treat.

== Cast and characters ==
- Adam Scott as James Webber
- Aime Todd Kelly as Paloma
- Danny McCarthy as Sa O'Halloran
- Eileen Fogarty as Cooper
- Gulshan Mia as Sa Farad
- K. Todd Freeman as Dr. Kaufman
- Kate Mara as Kate Michaels
- Lane Bajardi as Radio Announcer
- Michael Laurence as Bruce
- Nicole Beharie as Jamilah
- Rudy Galvan as Luis
- Tara Summers as Max

== Reception ==
On the website Stuff, George Fenwick expressed an initial uncertainty over the show's length, however, after listening he concluded that the show "justifies its length". The show contained ads, however, they didn't cover the cost of producing the show.
