= Crime Writers On =

Podcast that reviews true crime

'Crime Writers On...'
- Genre: True Crime, Comedy, Commentary, Arts

Cast and voices
- Hosted by: Rebecca Lavoie, Kevin Flynn, Toby Ball, Lara Bricker

Technical specifications
- Audio format: Podcast (via streaming or downloadable MP3)

Publication
- No. of episodes: 395 (as of June 24, 2021)
- Provider: Partners in Crime Media
- Updates: Twice Weekly: Mondays and Thursdays

Related
- Website: www.crimewriterson.com

Crime Writers On... (sometimes stylized as Crime Writers On or CWO) is a twice weekly podcast hosted by four American true crime authors: Rebecca Lavoie, Kevin Flynn, Toby Ball, and Lara Bricker. The podcast started on December 12, 2014, as a commentary on and review of the hit true crime podcast Serial. Crime Writers On grew to cover journalism and a variety of crime-related pop culture topics including other podcasts, films, and television shows. The panel often provides updates on the real life cases discussed in previous episodes as they develop.

In March 2018, Crime Writers On won the Discover Pod's Podcast Madness 2018, a March Madness style competition for podcasts.

== Hosts ==
Rebecca Lavoie is the Director of On Demand Audio at New Hampshire Public Radio. Lavoie previously worked as a freelance journalist and has co-authored five true crime books with her husband Kevin Flynn. Lavoie also works as a producer, host, or co-host on several other podcasts. She has appeared as an expert on true crime shows, including on Investigation Discovery.

Kevin Flynn, Lavoie's husband and co-author, is a journalist and the author of additional books including American Sweepstakes and Wicked Intentions. Flynn regularly appears as an expert on true crime television programs, including, Deadly Sins, Unusual Suspects, and On the Case with Paula Zahn. He also co-hosts of the Law & Order podcast These Are Their Stories, with Lavoie.

Toby Ball is a crime noir novelist who has written three books. Ball is also the Program Director of the Crimes Against Children Research Center at the University of New Hampshire. He runs the Partners in Crime Media account on Patreon and hosts other podcasts including Radio Free Dystopia and Strange Arrivals.

Lara Bricker is a private detective and freelance author of three books Bricker hosts a Patreon-exclusive podcast called Leave it to Bricker and a podcast version of her newspaper column, Exeter Life.

== Production ==
Crime Writers On is produced by Partners in Crime Media in Lavoie and Flynn's home in Hopkinton, New Hampshire, formerly known as Square Egg Studios. Episodes are typically uploaded Mondays and Thursdays and receive around 100,000 downloads. The show includes recurring segments like Crime of the Week, Cat of the Week, and True Crime Update segments. The podcast has a presence on Twitter and Facebook. On July 7, 2020, the Crime Writers On began an exclusive partnership with Facebook. The videocast is released on Facebook Watch the day after the audio podcast release.

Occasional shows feature a guest host or interview with an expert on the programming being covered. Recurring guests have included Colin Miller and Rabia Chaudry, co-hosts of Undisclosed, and JAG Lt. Col. James Weirick (ret), host of Talk and Purpose Radio and the Military Justice podcast.

The show's original theme song was by Rocksteady Freddie and the New York Ska-Jazz Ensemble. The new version is performed by Ty Gibbons.

== Public appearances and reception ==
Crime Writers On has recorded multiple live episodes of the podcast, beginning in 2016. Respective co-hosts have also appeared at conventions and other events to discuss both true crime and their work in podcasting.

On December 5, 2017, the Crime Writers On podcast was parodied by Done Disappeared, a satirical crime podcast, in the "*BONUS EPISODE*".The fictional Crime Writers Off included Vanessa, Steven, Lauren, and Bobby Tall as versions of Lavoie, Flynn, Bricker, and Ball, respectively.

== See also ==
- List of American crime podcasts
