= World of Jenks =

American documentary TV series

- Genre: Documentary
- Directed by: Andrew Jenks
- Starring: Andrew Jenks
- Opening theme: "Soundtrack 2 My Life" by Kid Cudi
- Country of origin: United States
- No. of seasons: 2
- No. of episodes: 22

Production
- Executive producers: Andrew Jenks; Brent Haynes; Brooke Posch; Dave Snyder; Nick Predescu
- Running time: 22 minutes (Season 1); 40 to 42 minutes (Season 2)

Original release
- Network: MTV
- Release: September 12, 2010 – May 20, 2013

World of Jenks is an American documentary television series on MTV. The series premiered on September 13, 2010 following the 2010 MTV Video Music Awards. The second season of the series debuted on March 4, 2013 and consists of ten one-hour episodes.

== Background ==
The series stars Andrew Jenks and showcases the lives of inspirational young people from various locations of the United States. Jenks moves in with a different stranger for a week to experience their life from their perspective.

== Episodes ==
=== Series overview ===
Season	Episodes	Originally released	
Season	Episodes	First released	Last released
1	12	September 12, 2010	November 22, 2010
2	10	March 4, 2013	May 20, 2013

=== Season 1 (2010) ===
No. overall	No. in season	Title	Original release date	U.S. viewers (millions)
1	1	"Heaven and Hell"	September 12, 2010	4.8
In the series premiere of World Of Jenks, Andrew moves in with the rapper Maino. He uncovers the hardships Maino has gone through, including living in the ghetto and being in jail for kidnapping, but later discovers him to be a family man. Jenks discovers Maino is an inspiration for anyone going through hardship, particularly in the ghetto.
2	2	"Can't Make Me Be"	September 13, 2010	N/A
Jenks moves in with Chad, a twenty-year-old man living with autism. Jenks learns of the oppression Chad faces, as well as struggles of his daily life in order for people to understand and accept him.
3	3	"Street Queen"	September 20, 2010	3.3
Jenks lives of the streets of San Francisco for a week with a "houseless" woman named Danielle "Heavy D" Earls. Danielle has been houseless since the age of thirteen after she ran away from home because of the alcoholism and violence at her former house. Along the way, Andrew learns about the struggles she faces to survive, including where she sleeps, what she is going to eat, hitchhiking, panhandling, and more, every day. She struggles to reunite with her parents, but she needs them to get her social security card and other identification papers in order for her to get a job. Jenks learns that Danielle has aspirations of going back to school and giving back to society, and has developed a motto for life: "I feel that the meaning of life is to be happy, grateful and humble to grow, succeed, and fail. Care about one another, help yourself, and others if you can along the way. Do what makes your heart happy. Fight your inner demons. Focus on the positive. Say fuck off to your negatives and initially the purpose of life is to learn about yourself and to love yourself and stand up for what you believe in and no matter how bad life can be enjoy your life."
4	4	"Fifty Fists"	September 27, 2010	2.3
Jenks lives with a mixed martial arts fighter, Anthony "Showtime" Pettis. Pettis prepares for the biggest fight of his life, where if he loses the fight, his career may be over.
5	5	"Freedom's Flight"	October 4, 2010	1.2
Jenks spends a week with Brogan in Miami Beach. There he faces the scariest week of his life. Brogan enlists Andrew's help in putting on disguises and going undercover to expose horse slaughter farms. They face many dangers in the hopes of rescuing other horses from the same fate.
6	6	"The Takeover"	October 11, 2010	1.08
Jenks meets Nick, who became the youngest person to win the World Poker Tour at 21. He won 2 million dollars and lost it all in a year. Nick is on a quest to win it all back while he battles anxiety and depression.
7	7	"Road Warrior"	October 18, 2010	0.71
Jenks joins Warped Tour and meets Sierra Kusterbeck, lead singer of up and coming alternative rock band VersaEmerge. She is only 19 and is taking the tour by storm. Along with the acclaim comes a feeling of loneliness, detachment from her former life and home; meanwhile, she is doing her best to gain acceptance from male stars in the industry, as well as from herself.
8	8	"Me and My Surfboard"	October 25, 2010	0.88
Jenks meets up with professional surfer Anastasia Ashley, as she prepares for one of the biggest competitions of the year, the US Open of Surfing. She's a tough girl and a tough competitor as she tries to prove she belongs on the water despite emotional and familial issues.
9	9	"Hail Mary"	November 1, 2010	N/A
Jenks meets Jessi, an NFL cheerleader for the Tennessee Titans. Jessi reveals her decisions to leave a highly sought-after career in professional dance in Los Angeles for a simpler life in Nashville, Tennessee.
10	10	"Searching for VV Brown"	November 8, 2010	N/A
Jenks meets VV Brown, an upcoming British musician trying to make it big in the United States. He follows her to understand better why she got into the music industry, as well as her reasons for making the jump to "the States".
11	11	"Froot Loops for Dinner"	November 15, 2010	N/A
During a week in the Big Apple, Jenks moves in with rising comedy talent Dan St. Germain, as he prepares for the biggest and most important stand-up show of his career while coping with previous mental issues and his own fears.
12	12	"Black and Gold"	November 22, 2010	N/A
In the one-hour season finale, Jenks heads to Abilene, Texas and lives with high school football star Herschel Sims, as he prepares not only for his senior season, but also the release of his mother from prison. The episode is summarized with Herschel's activity in his team's nationwide-broadcast championship game.

=== Season 2 (2013) ===
No. overall	No. in season	Title	Original release date	U.S. viewers (millions)
13	1	"Live for Today, Pray for Tomorrow"	March 4, 2013	1.21
14	2	"It's Prom Night, Baby!"	March 11, 2013	N/A
15	3	"Facing Your Fears"	March 18, 2013	N/A
16	4	"The Speech, the Move & the Midnight Walk"	March 25, 2013	N/A
17	5	"Twists and Turns"	April 8, 2013	N/A
18	6	"Growing Pains"	April 15, 2013	N/A
19	7	"Under Pressure"	April 22, 2013	N/A
20	8	"Obstacles & Opportunities"	May 6, 2013	N/A
21	9	"Mac, Models & Chad's Big Move"	May 13, 2013	N/A
22	10	"It's Not Goodbye..."	May 20, 2013	N/A
