= Gangster Capitalism =

American politics and crime podcast

- Genre: documentary
- Language: English

Creative team
- Written by: Zak Levitt; Andrew Jenks

Cast and voices
- Hosted by: Andrew Jenks

Production
- Production: Chris Corcoran; Lloyd Lochridge; Perry Crowell; Ian Mandt

Technical specifications
- Audio format: Podcast (via streaming or downloadable MP3)

Publication
- No. of seasons: 3
- No. of episodes: 25
- Original release: May 14, 2019
- Provider: Cadence13

Related
- Website: shows.cadence13.com/tag/Gangster%20Capitalism

Gangster Capitalism is an American podcast hosted by Andrew Jenks. The first season focused on the 2019 college admissions bribery scandal. Season two focuses on the National Rifle Association of America. Season three focuses on Jerry Falwell Jr. and Liberty University. It is the first podcast produced as part of Cadence13's C13Originals.

During season one, Jenks and actors read portions of the FBI affidavit, including transcripts of phone calls between Rick Singer and his clients involved in the college admissions scandal. Levitt stated that the goal of the podcast was to shed light on the larger societal problem that the admissions scandal reflected. In September 2019, the season one was optioned as a television project with Entertainment 360, with the script written by Margaret Nagle.

== Episodes ==
Season	Episodes	Originally released	
Season	Episodes	First released	Last released
1	6, One Bonus	May 14, 2019	October 9, 2019
2	8, One Bonus	March 25, 2020	July 22, 2020
3	8, Two Bonus	May 24, 2021	December 8, 2021

== See also ==
- List of American crime podcasts
- Political podcast
