= Murder of Riley Fox =

2004 child murder in Wilmington, Illinois, US

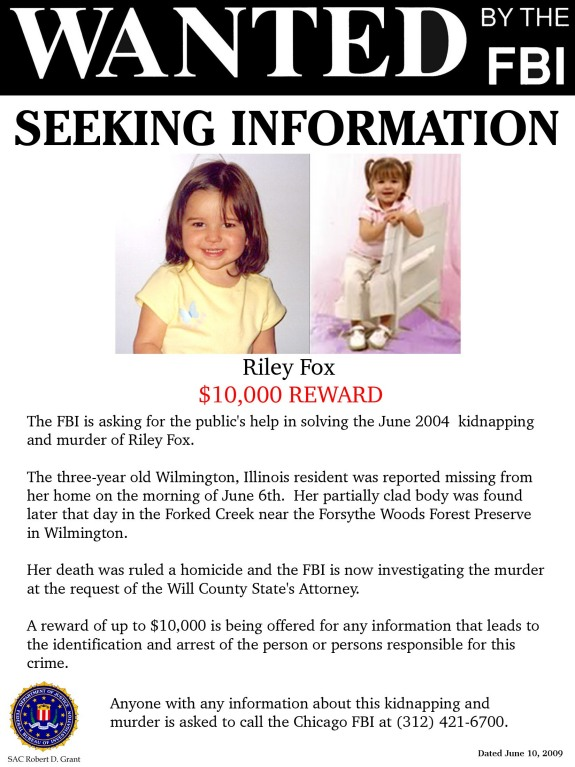
Riley Fox

Riley Fox (March 31, 2001 – June 6, 2004) was a 3-year-old girl from Wilmington, Illinois, who was murdered on June 6, 2004. After Riley's father was initially accused and then cleared by DNA evidence, paroled convict Scott Eby confessed to the crime and was convicted. Eby died in prison on December 7, 2023 while serving a life sentence without parole he received for the murder.

== Disappearance ==
On June 6, 2004, the night of the disappearance, Riley's father Kevin Fox had picked up his children from their grandmother's house around 1 am. Because the kids' beds didn't have clean sheets and blankets on them, he laid Riley on the couch and Riley's older brother Tyler on the living room chair. He then went to his room, watched TV and went to sleep around 2:33. The next morning he was awakened by Tyler, who told him that Riley was gone. After searching and checking with neighbors, he called police.

== Discovery of body ==
Later that day Riley was found dead in Forsythe Woods County Forest Preserve, a public park a few miles from Wilmington. She was found face down in a creek, having been bound, gagged, and sexually assaulted before being drowned.

== Investigation ==
The girl's father, Kevin Fox, was initially charged based on a coerced confession. He spent eight months in jail before being cleared by DNA evidence showing that someone else had committed the crime.

Fox's attorney Kathleen Zellner obtained a court order for new DNA tests on saliva, previously deemed inconclusive, with the new findings excluding Fox. Police had found a pair of mud-covered shoes at the scene with the name Eby written inside, but did nothing with this evidence. They ignored other important clues as well, such as the fact that a nearby house was burglarized during the same night that Riley disappeared. The Fox family later won a $15.5 million jury verdict (later reduced to $8.5 million) in a federal civil rights lawsuit against Will County Sheriff's Office and the detectives who had coerced Kevin Fox's confession.

Scott Eby was later charged on five counts of first-degree murder and one count of predatory sexual assault after DNA evidence linked him to Riley. At the time he was charged, Eby was serving two consecutive seven-year sentences for other crimes. Eby confessed that he cut the screen of a neighbor's home across the street and stole $40. Then he walked across the street to the Fox home. Eby entered through the back door of the Fox home because it was broken and couldn't lock. He looked for things to steal but he found nothing worth taking. Eby saw Riley and her brother asleep on the couch and recliner in the living room and later stated he “fixated on the little girl”. He left the house, got into his car and backed into the Fox's driveway. He then went back into the Fox home, covered Riley's mouth, picked her up, walked out the front door, put her into the trunk of his car, and drove her to a nearby park. He assaulted her in a men's restroom. He then drowned her in a nearby creek. He received a life sentence without the possibility of parole. He had been on parole and living about a mile from the Fox's home at the time of the crime. In March 2023, Kevin Fox died in a car crash in Arkansas, where he was living with his new wife and children.

== See also ==
- List of homicides in Illinois
- List of kidnappings
