= Kiernan Shipka =

American actress (born 1999)

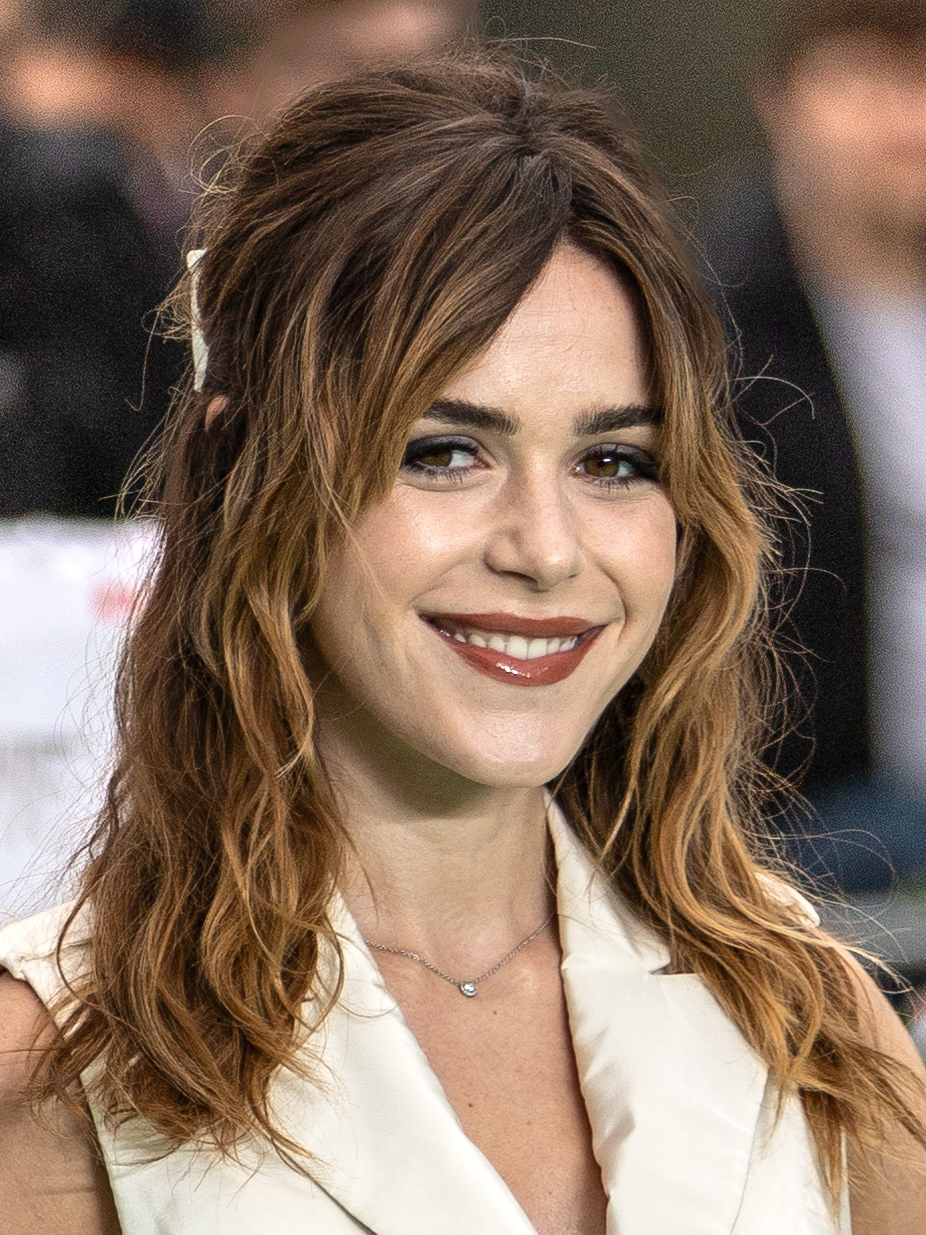
- Shipka in 2024
- Born: Kiernan Brennan Shipka; November 10, 1999 (age 27); Chicago, Illinois, U.S.
- Occupation: Actress
- Years active: 2000–present

Kiernan Brennan Shipka (born November 10, 1999) is an American actress. She is best known for her roles as Sally Draper in the AMC drama series Mad Men (2007–2015), and Sabrina Spellman in the Netflix fantasy series Chilling Adventures of Sabrina (2018–2020) and the sixth season of The CW series Riverdale (2021–2022).

In addition to supporting roles in films such as Longlegs, Twisters, and The Last Showgirl (all in 2024), Shipka has also had starring roles in The Blackcoat's Daughter (2015), Totally Killer (2023), and Sweethearts (2024), among others.

== Early life ==
Kiernan Brennan Shipka was born on November 10, 1999, in Chicago, Illinois, to John Young Shipka, a real-estate developer, and Erin Ann Brennan. She is of mostly Irish and Slovak descent. She also has notable German, English, Scottish, and Italian heritage. Shipka started taking ballroom dancing classes at the age of five and was still attending classes as of March 2012. When she was six, her family relocated to Los Angeles to help with her acting career.

== Career ==
=== 2000–2017: Beginnings and Mad Men ===
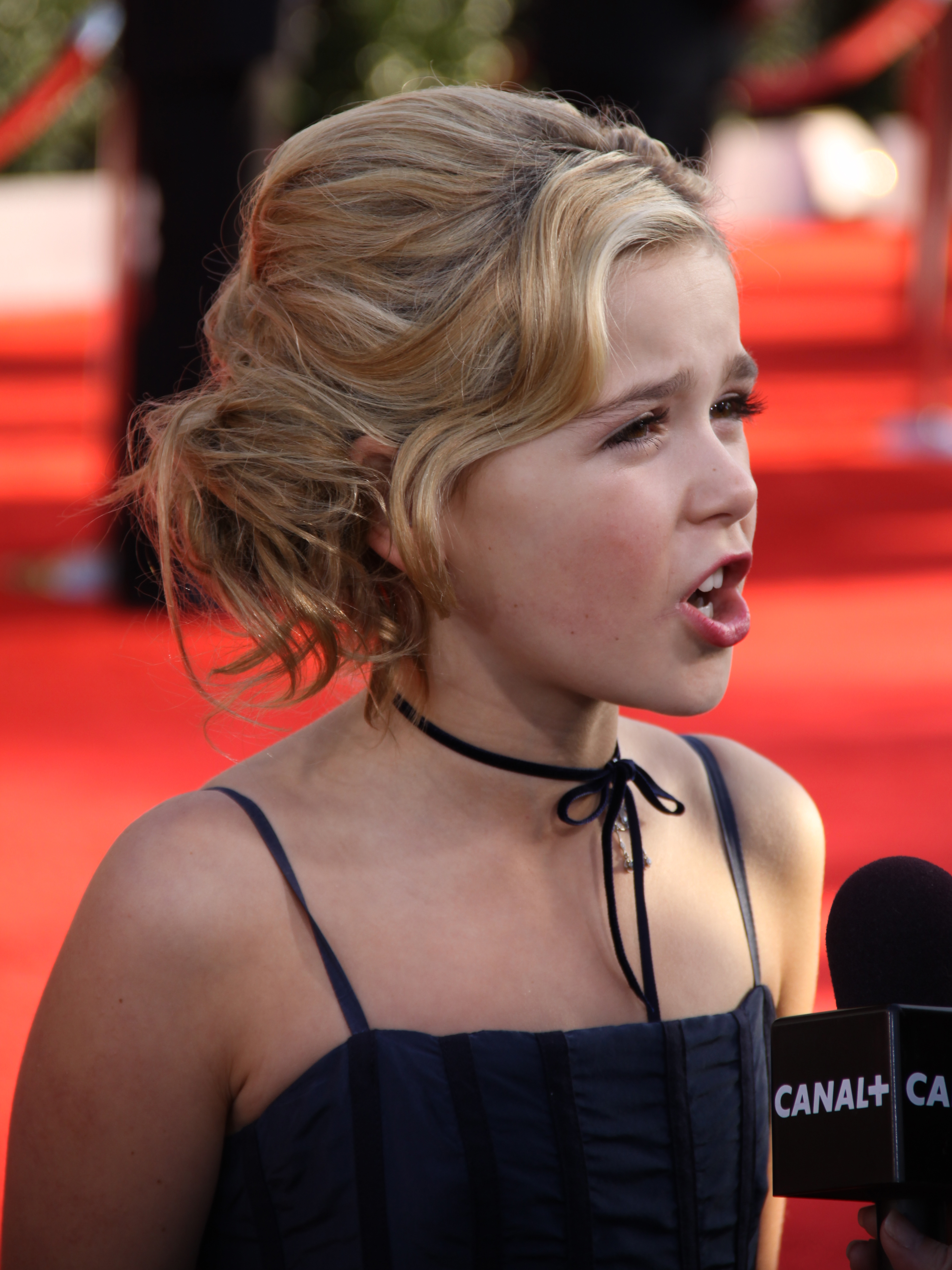
Shipka at the 2010 Screen Actors Guild Awards

In April 2000, Shipka made her television debut at five months of age on the hospital drama ER. She started commercial-print modeling when she was a baby. After undertaking small television roles, her first major role was as Sally Draper, the daughter of main character Don Draper, on the 2007–2015 TV series Mad Men. She won the role after two auditions. She was a recurring guest star for the show's first three seasons, then became a series regular in season four.

As part of Mad Men's ensemble cast, she won the Screen Actors Guild Award for Outstanding Performance by an Ensemble in a Drama Series in 2008 and 2009. Shipka received praise for her performance on Mad Men. In 2010, Austin American-Statesman critic Dale Roe named her as his dream nominee for the Primetime Emmy Award for Outstanding Guest Actress in a Drama Series, writing, "This 10-year-old actress was so affecting as troubled Sally Draper last season that it seems odd that she's only just been upgraded to series regular. If Shipka's upcoming Mad Men work—struggling with the broken marriage of her parents and entering preteendom in the tumultuous 1960s—remains as amazing as it was in season three, this is a ballot wish that could come true next year."

Beginning in 2012, Shipka voiced Jinora in the Nickelodeon animated series The Legend of Korra, the sequel to Avatar: The Last Airbender. In 2014, Shipka was named one of "The 25 Most Influential Teens of 2014" by Time magazine. That same year, IndieWire included her in their list of "20 Actors To Watch That Are Under 20". She starred in the 2014 Lifetime movie Flowers in the Attic, based on the 1979 novel of the same name by V. C. Andrews. The following year she co-starred with Emma Roberts in the Osgood Perkins horror film The Blackcoat's Daughter, and with Timothée Chalamet in the fantasy thriller One & Two. Additionally, she voiced the title character in the English dub of Studio Ghibli's When Marnie Was There. In 2017, Shipka portrayed B.D. Hyman, daughter of Bette Davis, in the FX television series Feud: Bette and Joan.

=== 2018–2021: Chilling Adventures of Sabrina ===
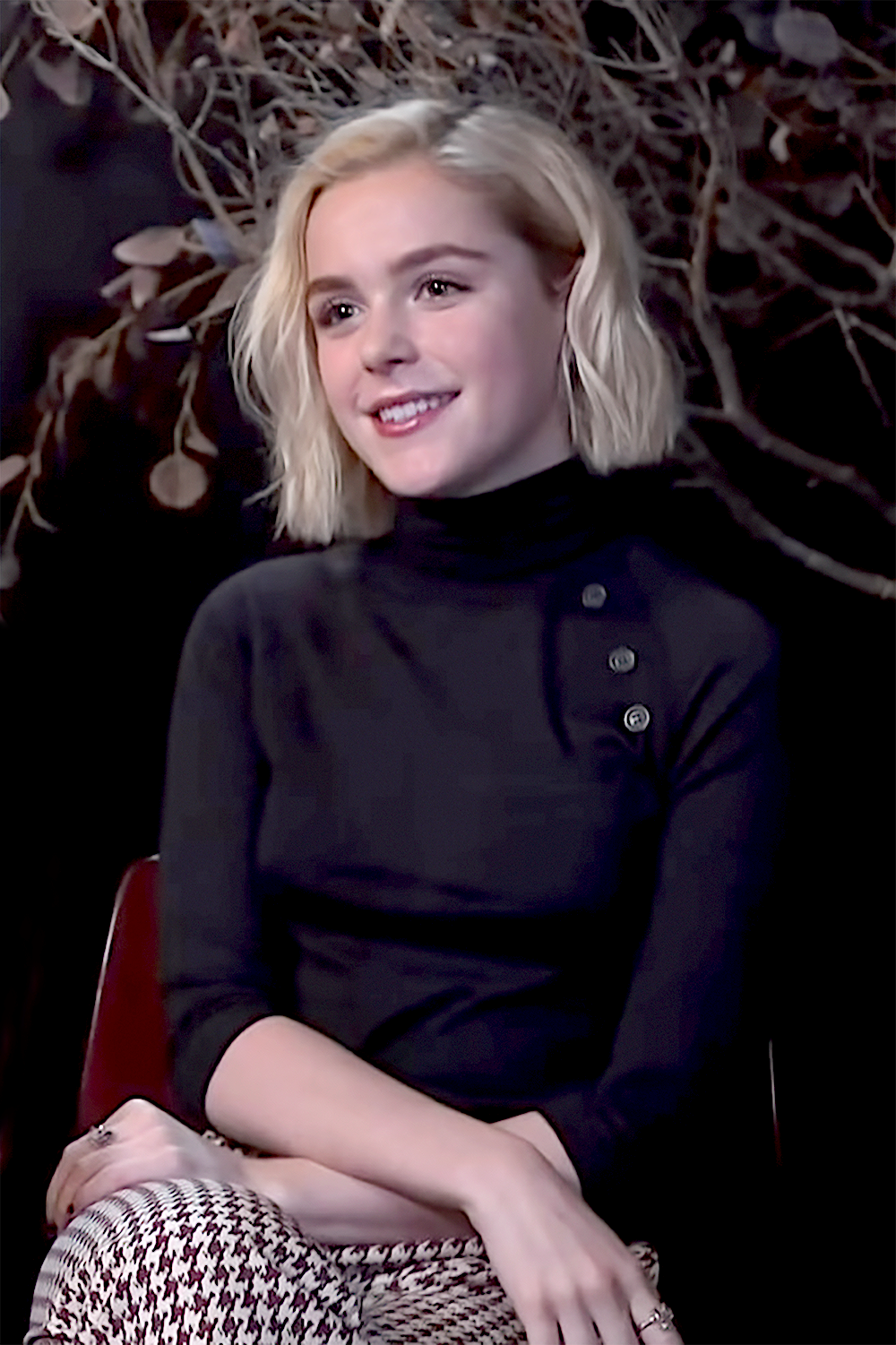
Shipka in 2018.

In January 2018, Shipka was announced to be starring as Sabrina Spellman in Netflix's Chilling Adventures of Sabrina series based on the comic series of the same name. The first part was released by Netflix on October 26, 2018. The show ran for three more parts, concluding on December 31, 2020, with a total of 36 episodes. Shipka reprised the role in two episodes of Riverdale, "Chapter Ninety-Nine: The Witching Hour(s)" and "Chapter One Hundred and Fourteen: The Witches of Riverdale", which aired on December 7, 2021, and July 10, 2022, respectively.

Shipka played a deaf teenager opposite Stanley Tucci in John R. Leonetti's horror film The Silence, based on the 2015 novel of the same name by Tim Lebbon. Netflix released the film on April 10, 2019. Shipka learned American Sign Language for the role and Leonetti praised her performance, saying: "She's acting alongside Stanley Tucci, and believe me, she's more than holding her own. It's been spellbinding watching her." That same year, Shipka co-starred in the Christmas romantic comedy film Let It Snow, based on the novel Let It Snow: Three Holiday Romances.

=== 2022–present: Further work ===
In 2022, Shipka starred alongside Diane Kruger in the psychological drama series Swimming with Sharks, inspired by the 1994 film of the same name. She also played Bea Johnson, the daughter of two intellectually disabled parents, in the drama Wildflower. The following year she appeared in the HBO political drama limited series White House Plumbers, portraying Kevan Hunt, daughter of E. Howard Hunt. In October 2023, Shipka starred alongside actress Olivia Holt in Amazon Prime Video's 1980s horror-comedy Totally Killer.

In July 2024, Shipka appeared in the horror thriller Longlegs, reuniting her with The Blackcoat's Daughter director Osgood Perkins. Later that year, she had supporting roles in the films Twisters, The Last Showgirl and Red One. In addition, she co-starred alongside Nico Hiraga in the Max romantic comedy Sweethearts, and in the thriller film Stone Cold Fox, which premiered in November 2025.

In 2026, she appeared in the fourth season of the HBO/BBC drama Industry. She also starred in the comedy film Idiots, which premiered at the 2026 Sundance Film Festival.

She is set to star alongside Cole Sprouse in the romantic comedy Goodbye Girl, as well as The Nowhere Game, which will reunite her with Mckenna Grace, who portrayed the younger version of her character in Chilling Adventures of Sabrina.

== Filmography ==
=== Film ===
Key
†	Denotes films that have not yet been released

Year	Title	Role	Notes
2008	Lower Learning	Sarah	
2009	Land of the Lost	Tar Pits Kid	Uncredited
2009	Carriers	Jodie	
2009	House Broken	Tammy Tawber	
2010	Cats & Dogs: The Revenge of Kitty Galore	Little Girl	
2013	Very Good Girls	Eleanor Berger	
2015	One & Two	Eva	
2015	When Marnie Was There	Marnie (voice)	
2015	The Blackcoat's Daughter	Katherine / Kat / young Joan	
2019	The Silence	Ally Andrews	
2019	Let It Snow	Angie	
2022	Wildflower	Bambi "Bea" Johnson	
2023	Totally Killer	Jamie Hughes / Colette	
2024	Longlegs	Carrie Anne Camera	
2024	Twisters	Addy	
2024	The Last Showgirl	Jodie	
2024	Sweethearts	Jamie	
2024	Red One	Grýla	
2025	Stone Cold Fox	Fox	
2026	Idiots	Irina Asantas	
2026	Iconoclast		
2027	Goodbye Girl †	Jess	Post-production

=== Television ===
Year	Title	Role	Notes	Ref.
2006	Monk	Little Girl	Episode: "Mr. Monk Gets a New Shrink"	
2007	Cory in the House	Sophie's Classmate	Episode: "Mall of Confusion"	
2007	Mad TV	Upset Child	Episode: "Madtv Ruined My Life"	
2007	Heroes	Little Girl in Fire	Episode: "Four Months Ago..."	
2007–2009	Jimmy Kimmel Live!	Various	6 episodes	
2007–2015	Mad Men	Sally Draper	Recurring in seasons 1–3; Main role in seasons 4–7	
2012	Don't Trust the B— in Apartment 23	Herself	Episode: "Parent Trap..."	
2012	Inside the Actors Studio	Herself	Season 18 Episode 4: "The Cast of Mad Men"	
2012–2014	The Legend of Korra	Jinora (voice)	Recurring in Book 1; Main role in Books 2–4	
2013–2018	Sofia the First	Oona (voice)	Recurring role; 3 episodes	
2014	Flowers in the Attic	Cathy Dollanganger	TV movie	
2015	Unbreakable Kimmy Schmidt	Kymmi	Episode: "Kimmy Has A Birthday!"	
2015	Fan Girl	Telulah "Lu" Farrow	TV movie	
2015	Project Runway	Herself - Judge	Episode: "Fashion Flip"	
2017	Feud: Bette and Joan	B. D. Hyman	Recurring role; 5 episodes	
2017	American Dad!	Student (voice)	Episode: "The Witches of Langley"	
2017	Family Guy	Singing Cheerleader (voice)	Episode: "The Peter Principal"	
2017	Neo Yokio	Helenist (voice)	Episode: "O, the Helenists"	
2018–2020	Chilling Adventures of Sabrina	Sabrina Spellman and Sabrina Morningstar	Main role; 36 episodes	
2021–2022	Riverdale	Sabrina Spellman and Sabrina Morningstar	Special guest; 2 episodes	
2022	Swimming with Sharks	Lou Simms	Main role; 6 episodes	
2023	The Other Two	Herself	Episode: "Cary & Brooke Go to an AIDS Play"	
2023	White House Plumbers	Kevan Hunt	Miniseries; 3 episodes	
2025	Grimsburg	Mo11y (voice)	Episode: “Mo11y”	
2026	Industry	Hayley Clay	5 episodes	

=== Music videos ===
Year	Title	Artist(s)	Role	Ref.
2013	"We Rise Like Smoke"	Kyler England	Young Kyler	
2020	"Straight to Hell"	Kiernan Shipka & LVCRAFT	Sabrina Spellman	
2025	"Neverland"	Kid Cudi		
2026	"Do Me Right"	Mr. Fantasy	Herself	

=== Video games ===
Year	Title	Role	Notes	Ref.
2014	The Legend of Korra	Jinora	Voice	
2016	Marvel Avengers Academy	Jessica Drew / Spider-Woman	Voice	
2025	Call of Duty: Black Ops 7	Emma Kagan	Voice, motion capture and likeness	

=== Audio ===
Year	Title	Role	Notes	Ref.
2021	Treat	Allie West		

== Awards and nominations ==
Association	Year	Category	Nominated work	Result	Ref.
MTV Movie & TV Awards	2019	Best Performance in a Show	Chilling Adventures of Sabrina	Nominated	
San Sebastián International Film Festival	2024	Special Jury Prize (Note: Shared with Brenda Song, Pamela Anderson, Billie Lourd, Dave Bautista and Jamie Lee Curtis)	The Last Showgirl	Won	
Satellite Awards	2007	Best Cast – Television Series	Mad Men	Won	
Saturn Awards	2019	Best Actress in a Streaming Presentation	Chilling Adventures of Sabrina	Nominated	
Screen Actors Guild Awards	2008	Outstanding Performance by an Ensemble in a Drama Series	Mad Men	Won	
Screen Actors Guild Awards	2009	Outstanding Performance by an Ensemble in a Drama Series	Mad Men	Won	
Screen Actors Guild Awards	2010	Outstanding Performance by an Ensemble in a Drama Series	Mad Men	Nominated	
Screen Actors Guild Awards	2012	Outstanding Performance by an Ensemble in a Drama Series	Mad Men	Nominated	
Screen Actors Guild Awards	2015	Outstanding Performance by an Ensemble in a Drama Series	Mad Men	Nominated	
Teen Choice Awards	2019	Choice Sci-Fi/Fantasy TV Actress	Chilling Adventures of Sabrina	Nominated	
Women in Film Crystal + Lucy Awards	2013	Lucy Award	Mad Men	Won	
Young Artist Awards	2008	Best Performance in a TV Series – Recurring Young Actress	Mad Men	Nominated	
Young Artist Awards	2009	Best Performance in a Short Film – Young Actress	Squeaky Clean	Nominated	
Young Artist Awards	2009	Best Performance in a Feature Film – Supporting Young Actress	Carriers	Nominated	
Young Artist Awards	2010	Best Performance in a Feature Film – Leading Young Actress Ten and Under	Cats & Dogs: The Revenge of Kitty Galore	Nominated	
Young Artist Awards	2010	Best Performance in a TV Series (Comedy or Drama) – Supporting Young Actress	Mad Men	Nominated	
Young Artist Awards	2012	Best Performance in a TV Movie, Miniseries or Special – Leading Young Actress	Smooch	Nominated	
Young Artist Awards	2013	Best Performance in a Voice-Over Role (Television) – Young Actress	The Legend of Korra	Nominated	
Young Artist Awards	2013	Best Performance in a TV Series – Recurring Young Actress	Mad Men	Won	
Young Hollywood Awards	2012	Scene Stealer Female	Mad Men	Won	
Young Hollywood Awards	2014	You're So Fancy		Nominated	

== See also ==
Notes
