= Bruce Jenks =

United Nations official

Bruce Frederick Edward Jenks OBE served as director of the Bureau for Resources and Strategic Partnerships of the United Nations Development Programme (UNDP) 1995 to 2009/2010.

Jenks holds a Ph.D. in International Relations from Oxford University and Master of Arts degrees from Cambridge University (United Kingdom) and Johns Hopkins School of Advanced International Studies, Washington, DC.

In 1981, Jenks joined UNDP and was assigned to a variety tasks. He was appointed director of budget in 1990 and as director of Office of the Administrator in 1993. He was appointed by the UN Secretary-General as the first director of the United Nations Office and UNDP Representative in Brussels in 1995.

Jenks was appointed Officer of the Order of the British Empire (OBE) in the 2011 New Year Honours for services to the UNDP.

Jenks has been an adjunct professor at the Columbia University School of International and Public Affairs since 2010. He is also a visiting professor at the University of Geneva's International Organization MBA program. He is a fellow at the Center for International Cooperation (CIC) at NYU and has been a senior non-resident fellow at the Corporate Social Responsibility Initiative of the Harvard University Kennedy School of Government (2010–13).

In 2013 Jenks was appointed by the Secretary-General to be a member of the Council of the University for Peace. The Council elected him as Vice-President.

In 1985, he married Nancy Piper Jenks, a renowned specialist in international travel medicine and board member of the International Society of Travel Medicine. Speaking over five languages, she lecturers around the world on topics that include narrative medicine.

Jenks is the father of filmmaker Andrew Jenks.
