= Culpable (podcast) =

American true crime podcast

- Genre: Investigative journalism; True crime
- Language: English

Creative team
- Written by: Dennis Cooper

Cast and voices
- Hosted by: Dennis Cooper

Production
- Production: Dennis Cooper; Donald Albright; Jacob Bozarth
- Length: Variable (27–62 minutes)

Technical specifications
- Audio format: Podcast (via streaming or downloadable MP3)

Publication
- No. of seasons: 1
- No. of episodes: 15
- Original release: June 17, 2019
- Provider: Black Mountain Media; Tenderfoot TV; Resonate Recordings; Cadence13

Related
- Website: culpablepodcast.com

Culpable is an investigative true crime podcast hosted by Dennis Cooper that covers the 2014 death of 21-year-old Christian Andreacchio. It is produced by Dennis Cooper, Mark Minnery, Donald Albright, and Jacob Bozarth as a partnership of Black Mountain Media, Tenderfoot TV, Resonate Recordings, and Cadence13. In September 2019, the podcast was the #2 true-crime podcast and #3 podcast overall on Apple Podcasts. The podcast brought national attention to Andreacchio's case. Tenderfoot TV and Black Mountain Media offered a $100,000 reward for information leading to a conviction.

== History ==
In February 2014, Christian Andreacchio left his job on a tugboat, was picked up by Dylan Swearingen, and went to confront his girlfriend, Whitley Goodman, about her alleged cheating. Andreacchio was found dead in his apartment on February 26, 2014, in Meridian, Mississippi. After a brief investigation, the police ruled Andreacchio's death a suicide. He was found in the bathtub with a gunshot wound to the head. Andreacchio's mother, Rae Andreacchio, questioned the police's conclusion due to evidence that emerged showing it may have been a homicide. Swearingen and Goodman were both in the apartment with Andreacchio, and had arrest warrants which were never fulfilled by the Meridian Police Department. The gun was found near Christian's left leg, but he was right handed. Additionally, Rae claims that Christian once told her, "Mom, if anybody ever tells you I killed myself, you come looking—because I wouldn’t do that." In 2017, a jury did not indict two people who were connected to Andreacchio's death. Andreacchio's family hired a private investigator, Sheila Wysocki, to investigate the case. In August 2019 a district prosecutor announced that she was willing to reopen the case should new evidence come to light. In November 2019, the Meridian City Council asked the United States Department of Justice to investigate the city's handling of Andreacchio's case.

== Episodes ==
No.	Title	Length (minutes:seconds)	Original release date
1	"Trust the Process"	31:52	June 17, 2019
2	"Until We Meet Again"	43:15	June 17, 2019
3	"The Apartment"	39:28	June 24, 2019
4	"Complex"	32:12	July 1, 2019
5	"Gun Night"	35:27	July 8, 2019
6	"Welcome to Meridian"	49:19	July 15, 2019
N–A	"Q&A - 7.18.19"	27:03	July 18, 2019
7	"A Second Look"	44:04	July 22, 2019
8	"Doesn't Add Up"	48:55	July 29, 2019
9	"Time of Death"	39:28	August 5, 2019
N–A	"Q&A - 08.08.19"	27:34	August 8, 2019
10	"Persons of Interest"	31:13	August 12, 2019
11	"The Investigation Pt. 1"	54:57	August 19, 2019
12	"The Investigation Pt. 2"	48:38	August 26, 2019
N–A	"Q&A - 8.29.19"	33:44	August 29, 2019
13	"Behind Closed Doors"	61:10	September 2, 2019
14	"Case File"	47:10	September 9, 2019
15	"The Bigger Picture"	45:30	September 16, 2019
N–A	"Round Table - 9.26.19"	62:18	September 26, 2019
N–A	"Bonus Episode - 10.03.19"	49:02	October 3, 2019

== See also ==
- List of American crime podcasts
