= Brian D'Ambrosio =

American journalist

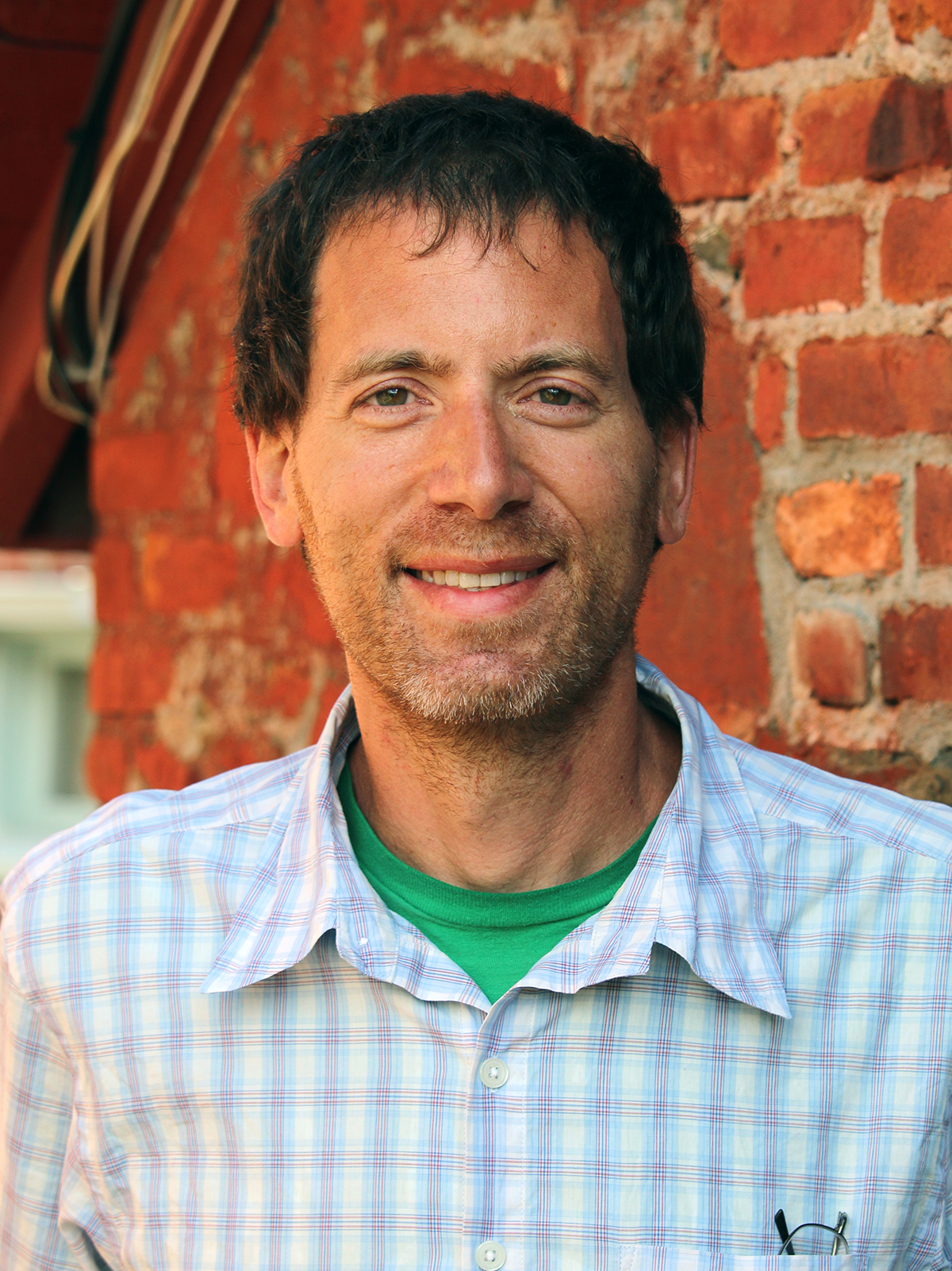
- Brian D'Ambrosio
- Born: 1975 (age 50–51); New York
- Education: SUNY Plattsburgh
- Occupation: Writer
- Writing career
- Genres: Sports history, Montana, True Crime
- Notable works: Warrior in the Ring: The Life of Marvin Camel, Native American World Champion Boxer
- Notable awards: High Plains Book Award finalist
- Criminal information
- Status: Sentenced
- Conviction: Theft of major artwork
- Criminal charges: Theft of major artwork; Interstate transportation of stolen property; 8 counts Wire Fraud
- Penalty: six months in prison, fines, restitution

Brian Anthony D'Ambrosio is an American journalist and author. In 2023, he was indicted for theft from the Montana Historical Society of objects of cultural heritage, including archival documents such as letters from Nancy Russell, wife of artist C.M. Russell. He was arrested after he attempted to sell stolen items he had placed for sale on eBay to an undercover FBI agent. He was convicted in 2024 and sentenced to six months in federal prison.

== Background and early career ==
D'Ambrosio was born in New York and grew up in Yonkers. After finishing high school he went to work for a Lake Placid newspaper. He later completed a degree in public relations and journalism at SUNY Plattsburgh. In 2000, he moved to Missoula, Montana, where he worked for a local newspaper. In 2008, he moved to Wisconsin, where he worked as a journalist for several years before returning to Montana.

After publishing some poetry and a couple of travel books, D'Ambrosio turned to writing primarily about Montana topics, sports, and true crime. He also has stated that he is a licensed private investigator in three states.

According to a December 2019 House of Mystery Radio program, D'Ambrosio worked as a private investigator and true crime journalist in Montana and Kansas. He stated in 2023 that he lived in Montana for 25 years; however, he was living in Santa Fe, New Mexico at the time of his arrest, and at the time of his plea.

== Book publication ==
Turning from journalism to books, D'Ambrosio spent two and a half years researching Charles Bronson for the biography Menacing Face Worth Millions: A Life of Charles Bronson. He interviewed Bronson's first wife, Harriet and other family members; former cast and crew members; and residents of Ehrenfeld, Pennsylvania, Bronson's hometown. The book was published in 2012 by Jabberwocky Press, a small Western Pennsylvania publisher, now defunct.

In 2013 he published a free ebook, Free Ryan Ferguson: 101 Reasons Why Ryan Should Be Released about Ryan W. Ferguson, with the help of Ryan's father Bill. For his next book D'Ambrosio interviewed 30 NHL players for Warriors on the Ice: Hockey's Toughest Talk.

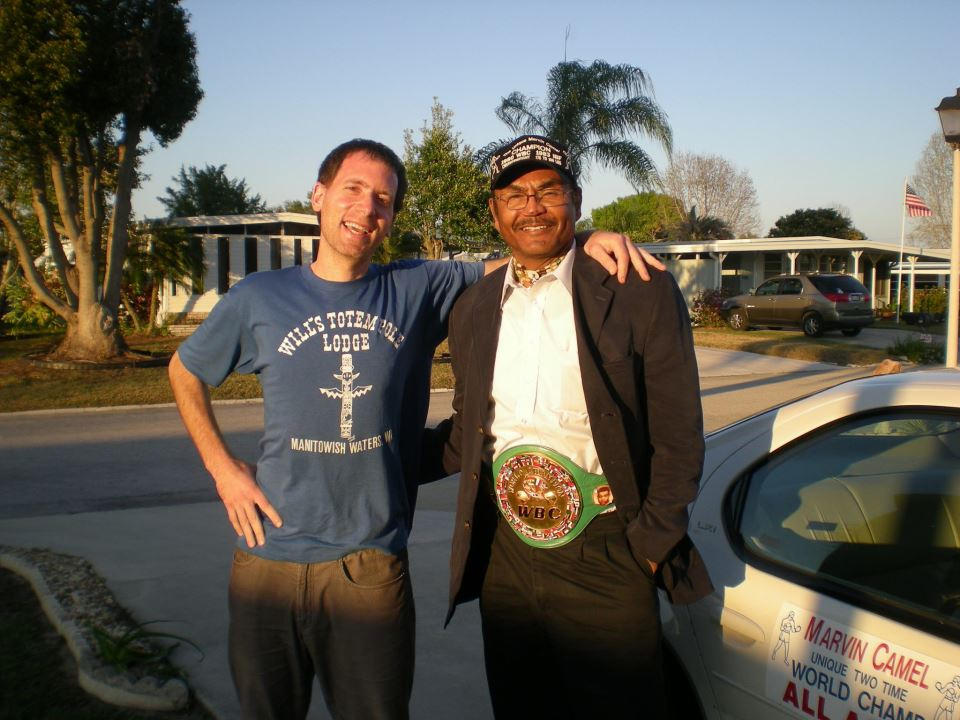
Brian D'Ambrosio with Marvin Camel

In 2015, D'Ambrosio published Warrior in the Ring, The Life of World Champion Native Boxer Marvin Camel, about boxer Marvin Camel, who was the first cruiserweight world champion. The work was a High Plains Book Award finalist.

Other books, some traditionally published, but most self-published, include Rasta in the Ring: The Life of Rastafarian Boxer Livingstone Bramble, Shot in Montana: A History of Big Sky Cinema, and Montana and the NFL, which profiled Montana-connected football players.

== Archive theft ==
In November 2023, D'Ambrosio was indicted on 10 counts related to theft of objects of cultural heritage from the Montana Historical Society which he offered for sale on eBay or to private collectors. The thefts occurred between April 2022 to September 2023. He was caught when attempting to sell items to an undercover FBI agent; the original indictment contained a list of eight items. The prosecution argued that the items D’Ambrosio stole would bring him significant profit, such letters from Nancy Russell, wife of artist C.M. Russell. He pled guilty to felony theft of major artwork in July 2024, and the remaining nine counts were dropped as part of the plea agreement. In December federal judge Brian Morris sentenced him to six months in federal prison, imposed a $4000 fine and ordered $22,508 in restitution. Upon release from incarceration, D’Ambrosio faces an additional year of supervised release. In addition to the 91 items D'Ambrosio tried to sell on eBay—at least 85 of which are believed to belong to the Montana Historical Society—the FBI also found 21 more historical items at D’Ambrosio's residence, and four more were returned from a local business. Though 11 of the eBay items were recovered, As of January 2025 the other 80—at least 74 thought to belong to the Society—have yet to be found.

U.S. Attorney Jesse Laslovich stated at sentencing, “D’Ambrosio’s actions were intentional and calculated—designed to steal Montana’s cultural treasures so he could profit. The Montana Historical Society, and all Montanans, were victims of D’Ambrosio’s greed because these documents were deeply rooted in Montana history." The Montana Historical Society staff provided an additional statement for the record, “The items stolen by you (D’Ambrosio) from the collections belong to the people of Montana, not to you for your selfish, greedy purposes. Your actions forced us to implement stricter rules regarding access and use of historical documents, which impacts all future researchers…. The emotional and financial impacts will be felt for generations.”

== Published works ==
D'Ambrosio's books include the following:

- D'Ambrosio, Brian (2010). A Wee Bit of Wisconsin. Jabberwocky Press. ISBN 978-0-557-37375-8.
- —— (2012). From Football to Fig Newtons: 76 American Inventors and The Inventions You Know By Heart. Lulu.com. ISBN 978-1105737725.
- —— (2012). Menacing Face Worth Millions: A Life of Charles Bronson. Jabberwocky Press (Lulu.com). ISBN 978-1-105-22629-8.
- —— (2013). Free Ryan Ferguson: 101 Reasons Why Ryan Should Be Released. Jabberwocky Press. ISBN 978-1-304-41289-8.
- —— (2013). Warriors on the Ice: Hockey's Toughest Talk. Jabberwocky Press (Lulu .com). ISBN 978-1-304-67527-9.
- —— (2014). Life in the Trenches. Firefly Books. ISBN 978-1-312-45510-8.
- —— (2015). Warrior in the ring : the life of Marvin Camel, Native American world champion boxer. Helena, MT: Riverbend Publishing. ISBN 978-1-60639-079-5.
- —— (2016). Rasta in the Ring: The Life of Rastafarian Boxer Livingstone Bramble. Firefly Books. ISBN 978-1-329-89848-6.
- —— (2016). Shot in Montana : a history of big sky cinema. Helena, MT: Riverbend Publishing. ISBN 978-1-60639-096-2.
- —— (2017). Montana and the NFL. Charleston, SC: The History Press. ISBN 978-1-62585-825-2.
- —— (2019). Montana Entertainers: Famous and Almost Forgotten. Charleston, SC: The History Press. ISBN 978-1467141109.
- —— (2020). Montana Murders: Notorious and Unsolved. Helena, MT: Riverbend Publishing. ISBN 978-1606391242.
- —— (2023). Montana Eccentrics. Helena, MT: Riverbend Publishing. ISBN 978-1606391389.
- —— (2024). Montana Murders: Notorious and Vanished. Helena, MT: Riverbend Publishing. ISBN 978-1606391433.
