= Motive (podcast) =

Investigative journalism podcast

Motive is a true crime podcast produced by the Chicago Sun-Times and WBEZ that debuted in 2019. Each season covers a different story over the course of eight to ten 30-minute episodes. The show has won a Peter Lisagor Award and a Robert F. Kennedy Journalism Award.

== Background ==
The show is a true crime podcast produced by the Chicago Sun-Times and WBEZ. The show debuted in 2019 and each season has included between eight and ten 30-minute episodes. The first season covers the story of a young boy named Thaddeus "T.J." Jimenez who was convicted of murder. Jimenez was released in his 30s and was given $25 million for being wrongfully convicted. The second season of the show focuses on the story of a young woman who was studying abroad in Spain. In 2015, on Lauren Bajorek's 21st birthday she was found dead outside an apartment owned by a Spanish tour guide. The third season of the show focuses on white supremacist groups in the United States. The season specifically looks at the 1980s in Chicago.

According to the vice president of communications at WBEZ, the show has been downloaded several million times and was one of their most successful shows. The show won in multiple categories at the 2019 Peter Lisagor Awards and was a finalist in 2020. The fourth season of the show won a Robert F. Kennedy Human Rights Award in 2023.

== See also ==
- List of American crime podcasts
