= Andrew Jenks =

American filmmaker (born 1986)

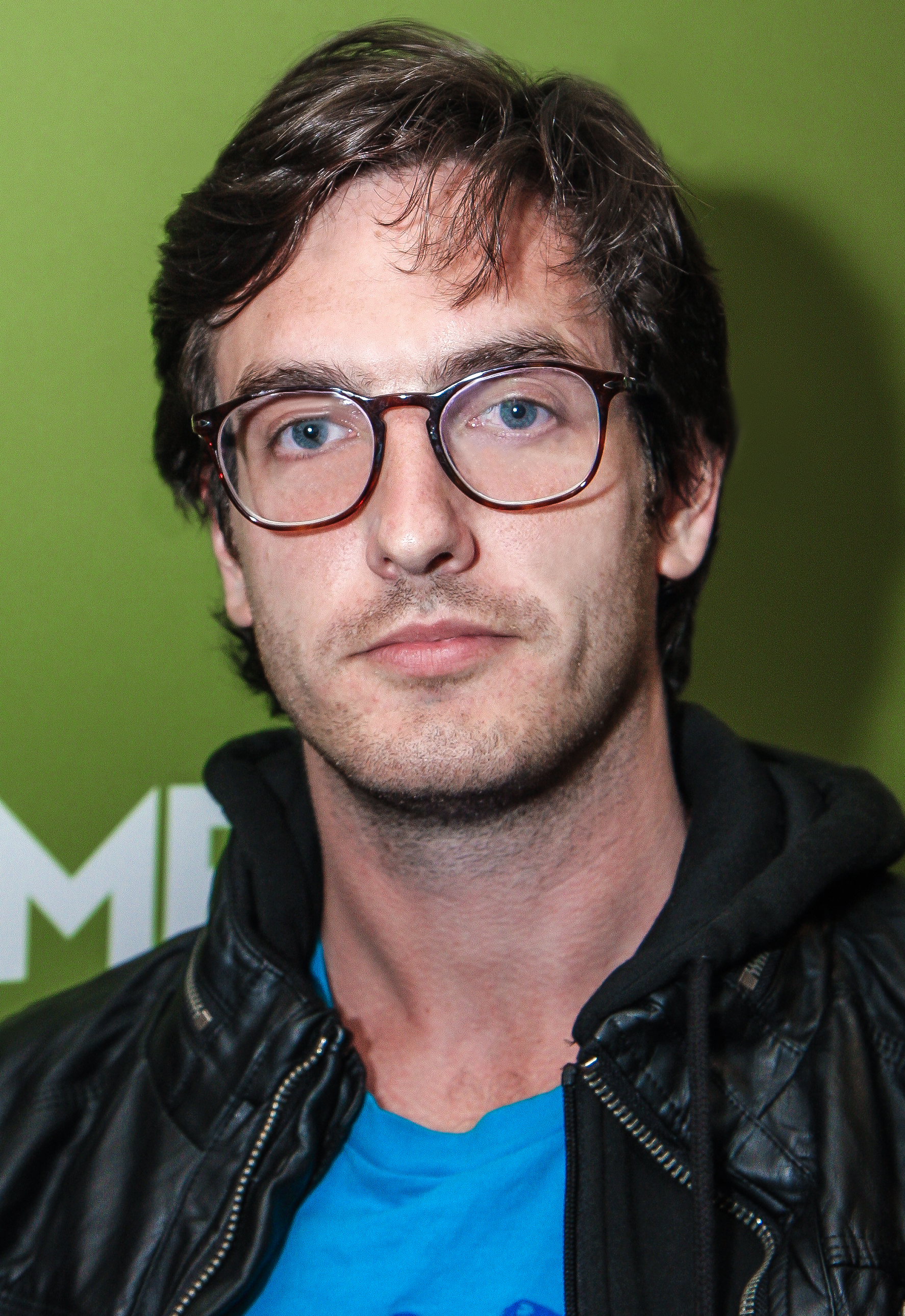
- Montclair Film Festival – May 3, 2015
- Born: March 5, 1986 (age 40); New York City, New York, United States
- Other names: Jenks, The Mighty Jenk
- Occupation: Filmmaker
- Notable work: Andrew Jenks, Room 335, The Zen of Bobby V, dream/killer, "Posterized" and World of Jenks

Andrew Jenks (born March 5, 1986) is an American filmmaker.

== Early life ==
When he was nine, his family moved to Belgium for two years. Jenks attended Hendrick Hudson High School in Montrose, New York. When Jenks was 16 he founded the Hendrick Hudson Film Festival, which in 2015 evolved into the All-American High School Film Festival, now the largest high school film festival in the world, awarding more than $4 million in scholarships.

His father is Bruce Jenks, former Assistant Secretary General for the United Nations. His mother is Nancy Piper Jenks, a family nurse practitioner in internal medicine in Peekskill, New York.

Jenks attended New York University Tisch School of the Arts before dropping out after his sophomore year.

== Andrew Jenks, Room 335 ==
At 19 years old, Jenks moved into an assisted living facility, starring, directing, and producing the feature film Andrew Jenks, Room 335. After editing the 200 hours of footage in his parents' basement, HBO bought the rights to the documentary and released the film on January 15, 2008. The New York Post said, "It's almost impossible to believe that a kid could produce a documentary like this. It's a gorgeous, hilarious, sad, wonderful, unblinking look at the joy of life – even at the end of it." Variety called it 'a lovely and genuine account of generational understanding'. As part of HBO's promotional tour, he traveled throughout the United States, Europe, and Australia. He was featured in The New York Times, Variety, and USA Today, and appeared on NBC's The Today Show, The Martha Stewart Show, and Anderson Cooper 360. Soon after, he dropped out of New York University.

At age 19, Jenks remains the youngest person in history to sell a completed feature-length film to a mainstream distributor.

== The Zen of Bobby V ==
When he was 21 years old, ESPN Films financed Andrew's second film, The Zen of Bobby V. The film received good reviews after premiering at the TriBeca Film Festival. Variety noted, "Jenks and his crew keep the tradition of verite cinema going by simply capturing what happens in front of the camera." Jenks remarked, “I remember one Monday, sophomore year of college, I was in class and the next Monday I was on the field in a 20,000-seat stadium in Japan, filming and traveling the country for 10 months, with the most famous person in the county."

== Acclaim as a young director ==
At the International Documentary Film Festival at Amsterdam, Jenks was widely acclaimed as one of the next great American filmmakers, and compared to filmmaker Woody Allen.

== World of Jenks ==
In January 2010, MTV signed Jenks to do a documentary-series titled World of Jenks. Jenks claimed his inspiration behind World of Jenks was that "I [Andrew] also want to tell the stories of my generation." In each episode, Andrew will move in with a new stranger to experience a week in their life, from random people, such as a homeless woman, a man with autism, a rapper, MMA fighter, a professional poker player, an NFL cheerleader, a female-fronted band, etc. The series premiered September 12, 2010, on MTV. Kid Cudi allowed this show to use his song 'Soundtrack 2 My Life' as its theme song. It was the highest rated premiere in the history of the network.

Season 2 of "World of Jenks" expanded to hour long episodes and continued to be a ratings hit. MSN remarked, "'Jenks – like Chad, Kaylin and D-Real – has overcome the odds and consistently triumphed in its timeslot."

The award-winning show was dubbed as a show unlike any other on MTV. U.S. News & World Report said, "The only way to understand someone else's life is to live it. That's the premise behind documentary filmmaker Andrew Jenks's World of Jenks... The result: a raw, intimate look at daily struggles and victories, and what it means to be a young person today." USA Today said, "MTV's World of Jenks is one of the few unscripted shows that's actually snark-free and helpful to people ... I do like how this series gives a voice to all kinds of teens, not just the pretty ones in fashionable clothes."

Jenks was the face MTV's 2012 election coverage, both producing and hosting. He interviewed or asked questions to nearly all of the candidates, including Governor Mitt Romney and President Barack Obama.

Jenks left the show after 3 years because of a new film about Ryan Ferguson.

== It's About a Girl ==
Jenks is the creator of It's About a Girl, a magic realism YouTube web series premiered July 9, 2013. He plays a man who pursues the girl of his dreams, played by Taryn Southern. Tubefilter praised the series for seeking a connection between dreams and reality and preferring symbolism and emotions over dialogue.

== Posterized ==
In May 2014, ESPN released the 30 for 30 short "Posterized", a look into former NBA center Shawn Bradley. Bradley is mostly remembered for two things—being one of the tallest players to ever play in the NBA and for being on the wrong end of a lot of great dunks. Through interviews with Jeff Van Gundy and Shawn Bradley, the film shows the media attention he gained while a player and then focuses on Bradley's life after basketball.

In 2014, ESPN Films' 30 for 30 Shorts series took home an Emmy for Outstanding Short-Format Nonfiction Program.

== Activism ==
Jenks had advocated on behalf of prisoners wrongfully incarcerated. In 2011, he called for the release of Ryan Ferguson. He later advocated for the release of Kalvin Michael Smith who was released after 20 years in prison.

Jenks has teamed up with DKMS and DoSomething to promote teens and college students to join the bone marrow donor registry. He will be participating in college speaking tours where he will try to raise awareness and involvement. He also did a PSA for Do Something with a five-year-old leukemia patient about the importance of "getting swabbed".

== It's Not Over ==
Jenks directed a feature-length documentary titled "It's Not Over", an inspiring story of three courageous millennials from around the world who are living with or affected by HIV/AIDS. Jenks takes viewers on a journey across India, South Africa and the United States to experience the epidemic first hand. The result is a deeply personal and uplifting story that is rarely represented in popular culture.

Rihanna took part in the production and press for the film.

It's Not Over was made possible by the M·A·C AIDS Fund and is available on Netflix, SnagFilms, Hulu and Pivot (where available).

== All American Family ==
In 2015, CNN Films released "All American Family", a short film Jenks' company produced and he directed. The film chronicles an all-Deaf high school championship football team. The film premiered at the Tribeca Film Festival and Los Angeles Film Festival and won Best Short Film at the Hamptons International Film Festival. Rich Eisen said the film was, "Friday Night Lights" like I haven't seen before." The deaf community lauded the film for capturing an accurate perspective of their life.

== dream/killer ==
Jenks premiered his latest feature documentary titled dream/killer at the 2015 Tribeca Film Festival, his most acclaimed film since ROOM 335. The New York Times said the film "elicits incredulity, frustration and astonishment...fast-paced and frightening.", the Village Voice calling it a "Must-See Wrongful-Conviction Doc 'dream/killer' Indicts a System.", and Rolling Stone saying, "Fans of Serial and The Jinx, meet your new favorite film." While in production, Jenks made head waves in the legal community after filming Ryan Ferguson in prison giving a plea straight to camera. After nearly 10 years, Ferguson's conviction was vacated. Jenks however indicated, the film is bittersweet, "I wanted to make sure that people knew this was not going to be a happy ending. Because it isn't."

In 2016, Jenks co-created and executive produced the MTV Series, "Unlocking the Truth". The docu-series followed Ryan Ferguson as he investigated three cases believed to have resulted in wrongful convictions. It is believed that the series led to the release of Kalvin Michael Smith. Jenks noted that, "This show starts and ends with Ryan Ferguson. He is a natural leader, a guy with zero self-pity for what he has been put through and instead has a unique instinct to wake up every morning and help others."

== Fictional Work ==
In 2015, Jenks sold a one-hour drama to ABC Studios, titled "Sam" which told the story of a high school teacher, kicked out of several public high schools for eccentric teaching methods, left with one last chance to teach with his best friend at an elite private school in New York City. ABC Family developed the script and passed on the project after the pilot stage.

Jenks sold and developed a half-hour comedy titled "The Motivational Speaker" to HBO in 2016. The project remains in development with HBO and Pretty Matches, the Sarah Jessica Parker production company.

== Podcasts ==
In 2019, Jenks began hosting the podcast Gangster Capitalism, the first C13Originals podcast produced by Cadence13. Season one was nominated for a Peabody Award and optioned as a TV series.

=== What Really Happened? ===
In October 2017, Jenks debuted as writer and narrator of the documentary podcast What Really Happened from Seven Bucks Productions, with executive producers Dwayne Johnson and Dany Garcia. The podcast is described as a rogue investigation into pop culture history. The Guardian noted “You can bet if there's something to unveil, he (Jenks) is the person to do it”.

The podcast has featured stories ranging from Jenks locating the previously unknown whereabouts of Rick Singer, the organizer of the U.S. college admissions bribery scandal, to a three-year investigation into Muhammad Ali's role in persuading a man not to jump from the ninth floor of an office building. The show has also included Jenks' in-person interview with Daniel Green, who was imprisoned for the murder of James R. Jordan Sr., the father of basketball player Michael Jordan, marking Green's first interview in more than a decade.

The podcast reached #1 on the international Apple Podcast charts and is now in its third season.

== All-American High School Film Festival ==
Jenks founded the all All-American High School Film Festival. The annual event is held at the AMC Theatres in Times Square, New York City, the largest movie theater in the United States. The festival has given over $1,000,000 in scholarships and prizes, hosted over 30 universities for the largest arts college fair in the country, and partnered with AT&T for an anti-bullying initiative. The festival was inspired after 10 years of Jenks' high school film festival. The 2021 festival had over 2,000 submissions from over 30 countries with judges such as Kristen Stewart, John Oliver, and James Earl Jones.

== Personal life ==
After the release of Pitch Perfect, E! News broke the story that Jenks was dating actress Brittany Snow. In 2019, The New York Post's Page Six reported Andrew was dating Barbara P Bush, the daughter of President George W. Bush.

On his podcast, What Really Happened?, produced by Dwayne Johnson, Andrew revealed "a few years back, I had battled depression, and it took time to just say that out loud", adding in an interview with Dr. Barbara Van Dahlen that while at MTV he was embarrassed and had turned down an offer to speak at the 2013 National Conference on Mental Health at the White House. Andrew said it was one of the "bigger regrets of my career".

In 2014, while only attaining a high school degree, Andrew received an honorary doctorate from Quinnipiac University for his “quest to uncover stories that beg to be told.”. A bomb threat delayed the event. Jenks, and the nearly 9,000 attendees, moved to the TD Bank Sports Center for the ceremony. After the incident, The Boston Globe reported Jenks privately met with Danielle Shea, who was arrested for claiming there was a bomb.
