= Dream/Killer =

2015 documentary film

dream/killer
- Theatrical release poster
- Directed by: Andrew Jenks
- Produced by: Andrew Jenks; Dylan Ratigan; Dale Rosenbloom
- Starring: Ryan W. Ferguson; Bill Ferguson; Leslie Ferguson; Charles Erickson; Kevin Crane; Kathleen Zellner
- Edited by: Sam Lee
- Music by: Jay Wadley
- Distributed by: Netflix
- Release date: April 15, 2015 (Tribeca Film Festival)
- Running time: 1 hour 46 minutes
- Country: United States
- Language: English

Dream/Killer, stylized onscreen as dream/killer, is a 2015 documentary film about the wrongful conviction of Ryan Ferguson based on the testimony of a classmate who said that he’d dreamt that Ferguson was the killer. The film details the case and Bill Ferguson's journey to free his son. It debuted at the 2015 Tribeca Film Festival. It aired in August 2016 as a two-hour special on the Investigation Discovery network. The documentary was later released on Netflix in 2019.

== Persons featured ==
- Ryan W. Ferguson
- Bill Ferguson
- Leslie Ferguson
- Charles Erickson
- Kevin Crane
- Kathleen Zellner

== Synopsis ==
dream/killer details the wrongful conviction of Ryan Ferguson who spent ten years in prison before having his conviction overturned. The film focuses on Ryan's father, Bill, as he pursues a campaign to keep public attention on Ryan's case and work with lawyers to appeal Ryan's conviction. The film documents the investigation into claims that Missouri prosecutor Kevin Crane pressured witnesses into implicating Ferguson as well as omitting evidence and using flawed interrogation techniques.

== Reception ==
In The New York Times Ken Jaworowski wrote, "dream/killer remains fast-paced and frightening". Rolling Stone writes that the film "show(s) the corruptive nature of power and brutally slow machinations of the U.S. justice system". Robert Abele of the Los Angeles Times was critical of the film however, writing that the film looked only at the chronology of events, not the deeper causes of the problems presented.

== See also ==
- List of wrongful convictions in the United States
- Overturned convictions in the United States
- Innocence Project
