= Ryan W. Ferguson =

American wrongly convicted of murder (born 1984)

Ryan Ferguson
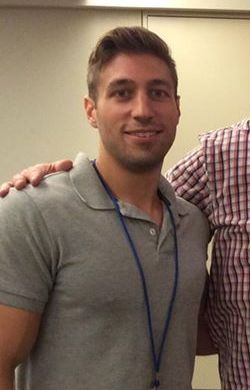
- Ferguson in 2014
- Born: October 19, 1984 (age 41); Northern Territory, Australia
- Known for: Exoneree of wrongful conviction of murder. Winning $43.8 million through a civil suit against his persecutors for the all-time highest bad-faith verdict in the state of Missouri.

Ryan W. Ferguson (born October 19, 1984) is an American man who spent nearly 10 years in prison after being wrongfully convicted of a 2001 murder in his hometown of Columbia, Missouri. At the time of the murder, Ferguson was a 17-year-old high-school student.

Kent Heitholt was found beaten and strangled shortly after 2:00 a.m. on November 1, 2001, in the parking lot of the Columbia Daily Tribune, where he worked as a sports editor. Heitholt's murder went unsolved for two years until police received a tip about a man named Charles Erickson who had spent that evening partying with Ferguson. Erickson could not remember the evening of the murder and was concerned that he may have been involved in it. Despite failing to recall having killed Heitholt, Erickson eventually confessed and implicated Ferguson in the crime as well. Ferguson was convicted in the fall of 2005 based on Erickson's testimony as well as that of a building employee.

Both witnesses later recanted their testimony, claiming that police and prosecuting attorney Kevin Crane, who later became a circuit court judge, had coerced them to lie. The 2005 conviction was vacated on November 5, 2013, by the Western District of the Missouri Court of Appeals, and Ferguson was released on the evening of November 12 after spending nearly a decade in prison. He won $43.8 million in a civil suit against Missouri police.

The case has been featured on 48 Hours, Dateline, and in numerous other newspapers and media outlets.

== Murder ==
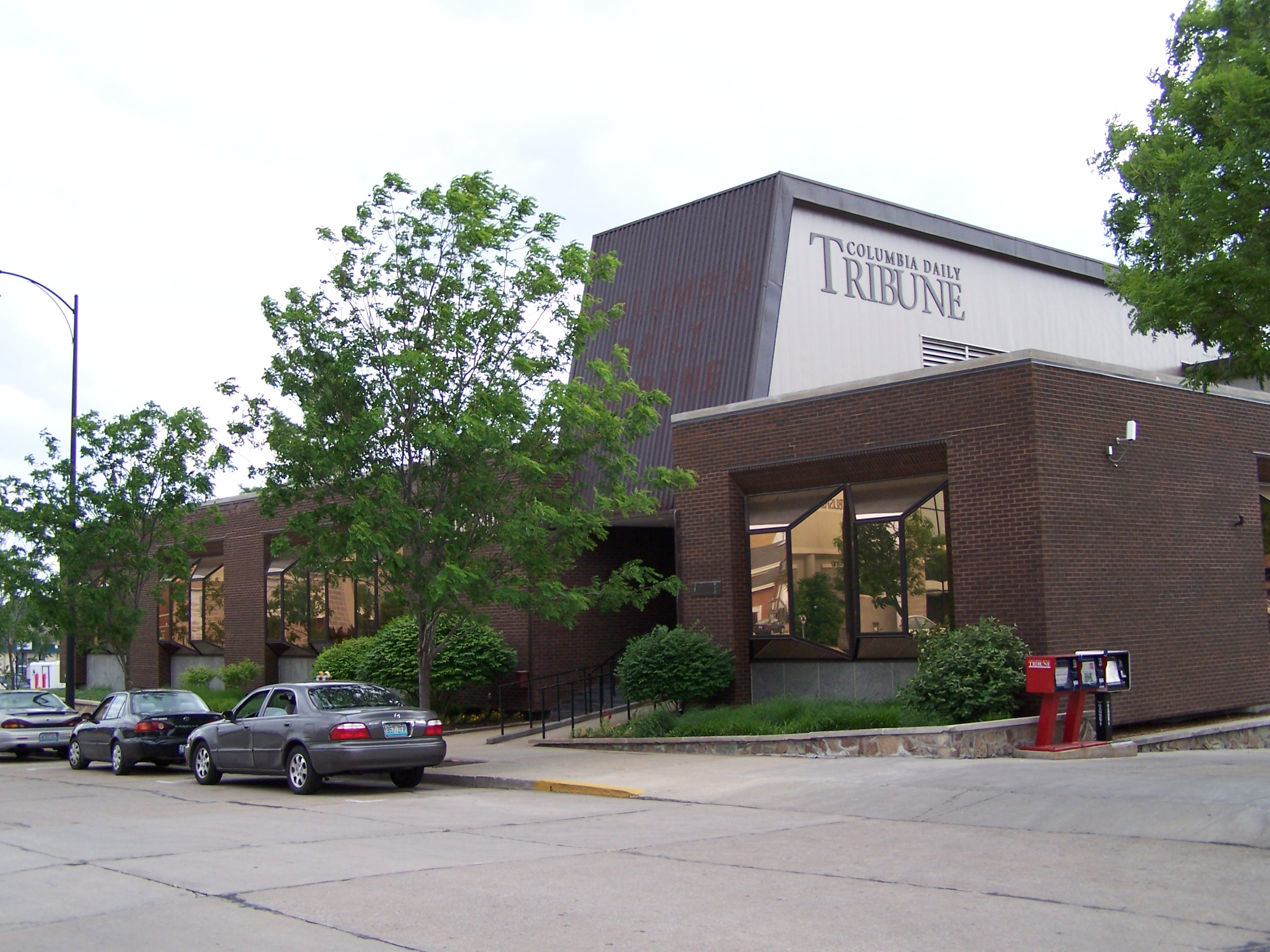
The Columbia Daily Tribune

In the early morning hours of November 1, 2001, 48-year-old Kent Heitholt was murdered in the parking lot of the Columbia Daily Tribune, where he worked as a sports editor. He was last seen alive by co-worker Michael Boyd, who told police that he had a work-related conversation with Heitholt in the parking lot between 2:12 and 2:20 a.m.

Minutes later, janitor Shawna Ornt stepped outside for a cigarette break and saw two shadowy figures near Heitholt's car. She ran back inside to get her supervisor, Jerry Trump. Both janitors witnessed two college-age men near Heitholt's car. The janitors reported that one of the men yelled, "Someone's hurt out here, man" before both men walked away through a nearby alley. The janitors notified other employees and called 9-1-1 at 2:26 a.m. Heitholt was found severely beaten with a blunt object and strangled.

On the same evening, 17-year-old high-school junior Ryan Ferguson and classmate Charles Erickson were attending Halloween parties in the area. Ferguson and Erickson later proceeded to meet Ferguson's sister at a bar called By George, where a bouncer who worked there would admit them despite their age. After the two men had spent all of their money at the bar, Ferguson's sister bought them a few additional drinks before they departed.

Erickson was under the influence of cocaine and alcohol that night, and the following day, he had no memory of what had happened. At a later hearing, attorneys asked Erickson whether he had noticed anything unusual on the morning of November 1, such as injuries or blood on his clothing, but he stated that he had not noticed anything out of the ordinary.

== Investigation ==
Ornt told police that she got a good look at the young men, while Trump reported that he was unable to see them clearly. Police recovered unidentified fingerprints on and inside Heitholt's car, as well as an unidentified hair in his hand. Police also recovered footprints from the blood at the crime scene. Ornt provided police with a description of the men, and a composite sketch was drawn.

The crime had been unsolved for two years when, in October 2003, local media again covered the murder. Erickson had reportedly experienced several dreams about the crime after having seen a newspaper article, and a few days later, Erickson asked Ferguson whether Ferguson believed that Erickson may have been involved in the murder. "It was crazy that someone had been murdered a couple of blocks away from where we had been partying," replied Erickson. Ferguson reassured him that he was not involved in the crime. Erickson says that over time, he began to increasingly ponder the murder and the fact that he could not remember that evening.

In November 2003, Erickson read an article in the local newspaper that included a sketch of a possible suspect. Erickson thought that the sketch resembled him and became more concerned. He asked a friend, Nick Gilpin, for advice, who mentioned something to another friend, John Alder. John Alder then called the police on his two friends, Erickson and Ferguson.

In the recorded interrogation, Erickson seems to know little about the crime. He told police, "It's just so foggy... I could be sitting here fabricating all of it." At one point, he was asked questions about the weapon used to strangle Heitholt. Erickson replied that he thought it was a shirt. When the police officer told him that it was not, he replied, "Maybe a bungee cord?" Eventually, the officer told Erickson that the weapon was Heitholt's own belt. Erickson replied, "I don't remember that at all." After much prodding by investigators, Erickson eventually told them that he and Ferguson robbed Heitholt for drinking money. In March 2004, Erickson and Ferguson were arrested and charged with the murder.

== Trial ==
The government offered Erickson a plea deal in exchange for testimony against Ferguson at his trial, which took place in 2005. Along with Erickson, Trump testified that he had seen Erickson and Ferguson at the scene. Trump testified that while he was in jail on unrelated charges, his wife sent him a news article about the crime. He claims that as he removed the newspaper from the envelope, he saw photos of Erickson and Ferguson and immediately recognized them as the two men standing over Heitholt on the evening of the murder.

When on the witness stand, Erickson provided a detailed description of Ferguson strangling Heitholt despite not remembering any details following the murder and during the interrogation. The defense countered that all of the evidence found at the crime scene pointed elsewhere. None of the hair, blood, or fingerprint samples collected at the crime scene were consistent with those of Ferguson or Erickson, and no traces of the victim's blood were found in the vehicle that Ferguson was driving the night of the murder. Ferguson was convicted of second-degree murder and robbery and sentenced to 40 years in prison.

== Conviction vacated, charges dismissed ==
Following the conviction, Ferguson gained a following with wrongful-conviction advocacy groups. In 2009, high-profile Chicago attorney Kathleen Zellner took over Ferguson's case, working pro bono. In 2012, both Erickson and Trump recanted their trial testimony in statements obtained by Zellner and her investigator. In the subsequent habeas corpus hearing, both Erickson and Trump admitted that they had lied at Ferguson's trial.

Erickson claimed that prosecutor Kevin Crane pressured him into implicating Ferguson. Erickson testified in the habeas hearing that he could not remember the evening of the murder because he was so intoxicated with drugs and alcohol that night that he had blacked out, causing his anterograde amnesia.

Trump recanted the story about his wife sending him the newspaper article and claimed that Crane had pressured him into testifying against Ferguson, saying that he had first seen the newspaper photos in 2004 at the prosecutor's office after he was released from prison. "On more than one occasion, he said 'I've got the right two guys' — almost like a cheerleader," Trump said, also alleging that Crane had shown him a Tribune newspaper with Ferguson's photo and that Crane mentioned that it would be "helpful" for Trump to identify Ferguson as having been at the crime scene.

Michael Boyd, the last person to have seen Heitholt alive in the parking lot, was also called as a witness. When questioning Boyd, Zellner elicited a timeline from him that placed him with Heitholt at the time of the murder. The court cited these critical admissions in its opinion. Boyd's five conflicting stories were known before the hearing, but he had never been called as a sworn witness in any court proceeding regarding the case.

Zellner filed an original writ of habeas corpus with the Missouri Court of Appeals, Western District, citing a number of flaws in the criminal trial. Notable among these was proof that the prosecution committed Brady violations by withholding evidence from the defense team. While questioning prosecution investigators at the habeas corpus hearing, Zellner's law partner Douglas Johnson uncovered that during an interview with Trump's wife, she had told investigators that she did not remember having sent him any newspapers. This interview was not disclosed to the original defense team. The Court of Appeals described "a pattern of non-disclosures" by the police and prosecutors that contributed to Ferguson's conviction.

Janitor Shawna Ornt, who witnessed two men fleeing the parking lot, testified that she had told Crane that the man whom she had seen on the night of the murder was not Ferguson. She claimed that Crane had repeatedly tried to induce her to implicate Ferguson and that Crane became threatening during her last conversation with him. Despite being the sole witness who had reported that she could identify the men at the scene, Ornt was never asked in court whether she could identify Ferguson. Zellner alleged that the prosecution did not tell Ornt to identify Ferguson because they knew that her answer would hurt their case.

Other evidence that had been withheld from the original defense team was related to the timeframe of the murder and Ferguson's and Erickson's movements during the evening. Erickson had testified at Ferguson's original trial that following the murder, he and Ferguson returned to the bar around 2:45 a.m. and were admitted by the same bouncer, Mike Schook, who had admitted them earlier. Erickson claimed on the stand that he and Ferguson had left the bar between 4:00 and 4:30 a.m. However, Schook testified that the bar had closed at 1:30 that morning, and bar patron Kim Bennett testified that Erickson and Ferguson departed between 1:15 and 1:30 a.m., disproving Erickson's claims that they had returned to the bar following the murder.

Ferguson's conviction was vacated in November 2013 because the prosecution had withheld evidence from the defense team. Following the reversal, the state attorney general announced that he did not plan to refile charges against Ferguson because Ferguson had presented overwhelming evidence of his innocence in his habeas corpus petition; a mere Brady violation would not have prevented a retrial. The case remains unsolved, and in 2013 the police said that they are considering reopening the case.

== Civil rights suit ==
On March 11, 2014, Ferguson filed a civil suit against 11 individuals as well as Boone County, Missouri and the city of Columbia in U.S. District Court for the Western District of Missouri. The suit alleged suppression of exculpatory evidence, fabrication of evidence, reckless or intentional failure to investigate, malicious prosecution, conspiracy to deprive constitutional rights, false arrest and defamation. The suit also claimed that following Ferguson's release, former prosecutor Kevin Crane and former Columbia police chief Randy Boehm harmed Ferguson by continuing to make statements about his guilt. The defendants included several police officers as well as Crane. Ultimately, all defendants were dismissed except for six police officers.

In a July 2017 settlement hearing, a judge awarded Ferguson $11 million — $1 million for each year he had spent in prison and $1 million for legal expenses. In the hearing, attorneys for the city compared the settlement to an Alford plea—not admitting liability, but admitting enough evidence exists that they would likely lose in court. Ferguson's case has been cited by the National Registry of Exonerations as an exoneration. The charges against him were dismissed because, as the Western District Appellate Court pointed out in its decision, there was no evidence left that would support a conviction.

In November 2024, Ferguson was awarded $38 million in damages after Traveler's Insurance failed to pay him from a previous wrongful conviction lawsuit. On June 16, 2025, Cole County, Missouri Judge Cotton Walker awarded Ferguson $43.8 million, adding several million dollars in interest to the amount the jury had awarded in November 2024, ordering "Traveler's to pay $41.6 million for claims of bad faith and another $2.14 million for vexatious refusal". Ferguson's lawyers, led by Kathleen Zellner, will receive $305,250.

== Charles Erickson ==
Charles Erickson received a 25-year sentence in exchange for testifying against Ferguson. Even though Erickson had implicated him in the crime, Ferguson has vowed to help Erickson with his release from prison. "There are more innocent people in prison, including Erickson... I know that he was used and manipulated and I kind of feel sorry for the guy. He needs help, he needs support, he doesn't belong in prison," Ferguson said. The Ferguson family has offered a $10,000 reward for tips that may solve the case.

Erickson filed an appeal in December 2018, which the court denied because he had already confessed to the crime. In June 2020, Erickson filed for a rehearing.

Erickson was released on parole in January 2023, after serving 18 years of his 25-year sentence.

== Media coverage ==
In September 2013, the first book about the Ryan Ferguson case was released: Free Ryan Ferguson: 101 Reasons Why Ryan Ferguson Should Be Released, by Brian D'Ambrosio. The book details allegations of police misconduct and intimidation by prosecutor Kevin Crane. There are also accounts of bogus police reports and alleged witnesses claiming that affidavits against Ferguson were signed in their names. D'Ambrosio proposes alternate theories and examines the allegations against Michael Boyd, the final person to speak with the victim. The case has been featured on 48 Hours, Dateline and in numerous other newspapers and media outlets.

A documentary titled dream/killer detailing the case and Bill Ferguson's journey to free his son debuted at the 2015 Tribeca Film Festival. It aired in August 2016 as a two-hour special on the Investigation Discovery network.

== Personal life ==
Soon after he was arrested, Ferguson began devoting his time to fitness and health and became a certified personal trainer. "I know you're innocent, but while you're in there, I can't protect you," his father told him four days after his arrest in 2004, "You have to do everything you can to make yourself stronger, faster, and smarter to survive." Ferguson began exercising and lifting weights while in prison.

In April 2016, it was announced that Ferguson would host an MTV series entitled Unlocking the Truth, a serialized documentary following other cases of possible wrongful conviction. In 2022, Ferguson was a contestant on the 33rd season of The Amazing Race with his friend Dusty Harris. His team finished in third place.

== See also ==
- Brady disclosure
- False confession
- Clarence Elkins
- False memory syndrome
- List of wrongful convictions in the United States
- Overturned convictions in the United States
- Prosecutorial misconduct
- Shareef Cousin

== Bibliography ==
- Ferguson, Ryan. Stronger, Faster, Smarter: A Guide to Your Most Powerful Body. Tarcher Publisher (2015). ISBN 978-0399173066.
