= Disgraceland (podcast) =

American true crime and music podcast

DISGRACELAND
- Genre: True crime
- Language: English

Cast and voices
- Hosted by: Jake Brennan

Technical specifications
- Audio format: Podcast

Publication
- No. of seasons: 26
- No. of episodes: 260
- Original release: February 12, 2018

Related
- Website: disgracelandpod.com

DISGRACELAND is an American true crime music podcast written and hosted by Jake Brennan. It is produced by Double Elvis Productions. The podcast was adapted into a book written by Brennan entitled "DISGRACELAND: Musicians Getting Away with Murder and Behaving Very Badly" published by Grand Central Publishing in 2019.

The podcast features stories about famed musicians and their associated true crimes. In 2021, Hollywoodland, a spin-off of Disgraceland, was released, exchanging musicians for acclaimed Hollywood actors and production figures.

== Reception ==
Complex named the series one of the "Best Music Podcasts". Cosmopolitan named the series one of its "25 best podcasts of 2018" in December 2018. Hot Press also selected the series as one of its top podcasts for 2020.

=== Accolades ===
- Winner of the 2019 iHeart Music Best Music Podcast
- Winner of the 2021 Webby for Best Music Podcast
- Winner of the 2023 Ambie Award for Best Original Score and Music Supervision
