= Jake Brennan =

American podcaster

- Born: April 10, 1974 (age 52); Worcester, Massachusetts, U.S.
- Occupation: Podcast host
- Years active: 1994–present
- Known for: Disgraceland

Jake Brennan (born April 10, 1974) is an American podcast host, author, and musician. He is the creator and host of the podcast Disgraceland, and author of the 2019 book Disgraceland: Musicians Getting Away with Murder and Behaving Very Badly.

== Personal life ==
Brennan is from Massachusetts and is the son of Boston-area musician Dennis Brennan.

== Career ==
=== Music ===
Due to his father's musical background, Brennan became involved in music when he was 20, joining the punk/metal band Cast Iron Hike in 1994 and signing on to the Victory Records label. He stayed through multiple tours, two EPs, and an album release before leaving the band in 1998. He went on to write and recorded music as a member of his own group, The Confidence Men, that he formed in 2001 with members including "drummer Rob Dulaney, guitarist Eric Barlow, keyboardist Scott Janovitz, and a bassist named Binky". They signed a record deal with the Jack of Hearts label run by Nashville music businessman Jack Emerson in 2003, with the aim to release their first album titled "Singer-Songriot" in early 2004. But Emerson's sudden death in December 2003 resulted in the album deal being cancelled. Instead, in April 2004, Brennan's band made a record deal with Yep Roc Records and Brennan also made a deal to release a solo album produced by Paul Q. Kolderie titled "Love and Bombs".

By 2010, Brennan had joined a new band named Bodega Girls under the pseudonym Jacob Otis. They won that year's DJ/Electronic Act of the Year award in the Boston Music Awards and aimed to release their first album as an independent app for the iPhone. But Apple refused to allow the app to be approved for the device due to the competition it would bring to the iTunes store if musical artists released their music separately. Acquiescing, the band released their singles on iTunes and overall aimed for their music to be entirely digital and not available in physical CDs, with Brennan noting "We're trying to find a way to release our stuff that's innovative. Because who's even buying albums?"

=== Podcasting ===
In 2020, Disgraceland received the Webby Award for Best Music Podcast. In 2020, Disgraceland received the iHeart Radio Music Award for Best Podcast and in 2018 and 2019 Disgraceland was named to Apple Music Best-Of lists for podcasts.

In 2018, Brennan co-founded Double Elvis, an audio company that has released the podcasts Dead and Gone which Brennan co-created and co-hosts with true crime podcaster Payne Lindsey, as well as the 27 Club and Blood On The Tracks podcasts, which he hosts and produces. Brennan has also served as executive producer on the podcast Dear Young Rocker and the fictional show, Here Comes The Break, that Double Elvis Productions co-produced with Def Jam Recordings.

Brennan created and hosted a spinoff of Disgraceland entitled "Badlands" which explores the lurid histories of celebrities and athletes in a single-voice narrative style that Brennan used previously.
