= Cadence13 =

American podcasting company

- Formerly: DGital Media Inc.
- Type: Subsidiary
- Industry: Digital media; Podcasts
- Founded: 2015; 11 years ago
- Defunct: 2024; 2 years ago
- Fate: Closed by Audacy
- Headquarters: New York City, United States
- Number of locations: 3
- Key people: Spencer Brown (CEO); Chris Corcoran (CCO); John Murphy (president)
- Products: Develop, distribute and monetize podcasts
- Number of employees: 56
- Parent: Audacy, Inc.
- Website: cadence13.com

Cadence13 (formerly DGital Media Inc.) was a media company based in New York City that created, distributed, and monetized audio content, primarily podcasts. The company was founded in 2015 and was a division of Audacy, Inc. The company was helmed by chief executive officer Spencer Brown, Chief Content Officer Chris Corcoran and President John Murphy. It was a major podcasting network and has produced podcasts for actor Joseph Gordon-Levitt, reality star Lauren Conrad, journalist Neil Strauss, and author Rachel Hollis. Cadence13 had partnerships with several other companies, including Goop, Crooked Media, and Tenderfoot TV.

== Background and history ==
David Landau and Spencer Brown worked together as co-CEOs for Westwood One and in 2015 founded Cadence13 as DGital Media, alongside venture capitalist Michael Rolnick. In 2017, Entercom purchased a 45 percent stake in DGital Media for $9.7 million.

In 2018, Cadence13 teamed up with the United Talent Agency to create Ramble, the "first podcast network devoted exclusively to online creators".

In April 2019, Cadence13 announced that it would be starting C13Originals, under which the company would release several new podcast shows featuring unscripted audio stories. The first C13Originals show released was Gangster Capitalism. In July 2019, a partnership was announced between Cadence13 and Nielsen Holdings, with Cadence13 being one of the first few companies under the Nielsen Podcast Listener Buying Power Service. On August 7, 2019, it was announced that broadcasting company Entercom had entered into an agreement with Cadence13 and Pineapple Street Media to acquire the companies.

Cadence13 was named one of Fast Company's "World's Most Innovative Companies for 2019".

In March 2020, Cadence13 announced that they would be launching a podcast with former presidential candidate Andrew Yang, titled Yang Speaks.

In early January 2024, it was announced that their parent company Audacy would be preparing to file for bankruptcy within the upcoming weeks. On January 7, 2024, Audacy filed for Chapter 11 bankruptcy protection. As part of the bankruptcy reorganization, Audacy has made a deal with its creditors to transfer control to them while cutting approximately $1.6 billion of its debt.

On March 21, 2024, Audacy announced it would be reorganizing its podcast division under the new branding of Audacy Podcasts. As part of the move, the company will be sunsetting the brand name of Cadence13 and moving the staff and content under the Audacy Podcasts umbrella. The reorganization comes as part of Audacy’s plan to emerge from Chapter 11 bankruptcy.

== List of podcasts ==
- 4D with Demi Lovato
- America Dissected
- Asking for a Friend
- The Ballad of Billy Balls/The RFK Tapes Podcast
- Black History Year
- Blockbuster: The Story of James Cameron
- Boardroom: Out of Office
- Campaign HQ with David Plouffe
- Clear Eyes, Full Hearts: A Friday Night Lights Rewatch Podcast
- Club Shay Shay
- Comments by Celebs
- Cover-Up
- Culpable
- Daily Breath with Deepak Chopra
- The Daily Punch
- The Dale Jr. Download
- David Ortiz: The Big Papi Story
- Dead and Gone
- Deepak Chopra's Infinite Potential
- Deux U
- The Edge
- The ETCs with Kevin Durant
- Everything Happens
- First Things First
- Fly on the Wall with Dana Carvey and David Spade
- Forward
- Gadget Lab Podcast
- Gaining Ground: The New Georgia
- Ghostwriter
- The GM Shuffle
- The Goop Podcast
- Happier in Hollywood
- Happier with Gretchen Rubin
- Hope Through History
- Hysteria
- In the Limelight
- Inside the Hive
- Jill on Money
- Keep It!
- Little Gold Men
- The Long Shot with Duncan Robinson and Davis Reid
- Lovett or Leave It
- No F*cks Given
- The Moment with Brian Koppelman
- The Old Man and the Three
- Origins with James Andrew Miller
- Psychobabble
- Pull Up with CJ McCollum
- Pulling the Thread with Elise Loehnen
- The Punies by Kobe Bryant
- The Rachel Hollis Podcast
- Radio Rental
- Rise Together with Dave Hollis
- She Rates Dogs
- Side Hustle School
- Skip and Shannon: Undisputed
- Speak for Yourself
- Sports Media with Richard Deitsch
- Still Watching
- Straight Up with Trent Shelton
- The Sunshine Place
- Tell Me with Ellen Pompeo
- This Land
- The Tony Kornheiser Show
- To Live and Die in L.A.
- Unsolved Mysteries
- Up and Vanished
- VIEWS
- What Really Happened?
- We Can Do Hard Things with Glennon Doyle
- What's in Your Glass? with Carmelo Anthony
- Whirlwind
- Whistleblower
- The Wilderness
- With Friends Like These
- Women Who Travel
- Yoga Girl: Conversations from the Heart
- Yoga Girl Daily
- You Must Remember This
- Zack to the Future

=== C13Originals ===
- Fallen Angel
- Fate of Fact
- Gangster Capitalism
- Gone South
- Hope, Through History
- It Was Said
- It Was Said: Sports
- Long May They Run
- No Place Like Home
- Once Upon a Time...
- One Click
- Relative Unknown

=== Ramble ===
- A Hot Dog is a Sandwich
- Anything Goes with Emma Chamberlain
- CHARLI AND DIXIE: 2 CHIX
- Ear Biscuits
- Guilty Pleasures
- Marc & Heidi - The Other D'Amelios
- Pretty Basic with Alisha Marie and Remi Cruz
- Queerified with Gigi Gorgeous & Mimi
- Rotten Mango
- SmoshCast
- The TryPod
- Trevor Talks Too Much
- You Can Sit With Us
