= List of Reply All episodes =

Reply All was an American podcast created and hosted by P. J. Vogt and Alex Goldman, produced by Gimlet Media. Reply All released its first episode on November 24, 2014. It peaked at #5 on the US iTunes charts on 3 December 2014. Emmanuel Dzotsi joined the show as a host in 2020. The show ended in 2022.

No.	Title	Original release date	US iTunes Chart Peak (week)
1	"An App Sends a Stranger to Say 'I Love You'"	November 24, 2014	-
An episode about a woman who uses Miranda July's app, "Somebody", to tell her ex that she loves him.
2	"The Secret, Gruesome Internet For Doctors"	November 24, 2014	-
An episode looking into the Figure 1 app, an image sharing app billed as the Instagram of doctors.
3	"We Know What You Did"	December 3, 2014	5
An episode interviewing Ethan Zuckerman and the consequences of his creation of the Pop-up ad.
4	"Follow the Money"	December 10, 2014	6
An episode interviewing writer Chiara Atik and her experiences watching financial transactions on Venmo.
5	"Jennicam"	December 17, 2014	23
An interview with Jennifer Ringley of Jennicam, one of the web's first lifecasters. Also featuring a segment on Email Debt Forgiveness Day. This episode was rebroadcast on April 26, 2016, featuring a new segment about how the world of lifecasting has changed since the original broadcast.
6	"This Proves Everything"	December 23, 2014	23
An episode interviewing film producer Keith Calder, who interacts with conspiracy theorists on Twitter who believe in a cover-up involving him, a model with the same last name, and two members of the band One Direction secretly dating each other.
7	"This Website is For Sale"	December 31, 2014	23
An episode about an investigation into the underground domain name sales on the Internet.
8	"Anxiety Box"	January 7, 2015	20
An episode featuring an interview with a man, Paul Ford, who built a website that sends him emails from his inner anxieties.
9	"The Writing on the Wall"	January 14, 2015	26
An episode about the racism on the app Yik Yak at Colgate University.
10	"The French Connection"	January 21, 2015	12
An episode covering the story of the minitel in the early days of the Internet in France, and one man's story of posing as a woman in sex chatrooms on the minitel to earn money. Also the first episode featuring Yes Yes No, about doxxing about a New York Times parody Twitter account
11	"Did Errol Morris' Brother Invent Email?"	January 28, 2015	13
An episode interviewing film director Errol Morris over rumors that his late brother had invented email during his time at MIT.
12	"Back End Trouble"	February 4, 2015	19
An episode covering one man, Greg Knauss, who was tasked with keeping Paper Magazine's servers running after publishing the Kim Kardashian "Break the Internet" photographs. Also an episode of Yes Yes No about political correctness and Weird Twitter.
13	"Love is Lies"	February 19, 2015	38
An episode about a woman in her 60s who meets a man that turns out to not be the person he says he is.
14	"The Art of Making and Fixing Mistakes"	February 26, 2015	44
An episode about airline corporation Twitter accounts mistakenly making inappropriate posts. In addition, an interview with Bryan Henderson about the dispute over the phrase "comprised of" on Wikipedia.
15	"I've Killed People and I Have Hostages"	March 4, 2015	45
An episode covering the Internet prank of swatting.
16	"Why Is Mason Reese Crying?"	March 18, 2015	32
An episode where author Jonathan Goldstein examines the social media presence of actor Mason Reese.
17	"The Time Traveler and the Hitman"	March 25, 2015	25
An episode about a man who posted an advertisement for time travel. Guest starring Lynn Levy.
18	"Silence and Respect"	April 1, 2015	28
An episode about a woman who lost her job after posting a widely-considered offensive picture at the Tomb of the Unknown Soldier, resulting in harassment from military members.
19	"Underdog"	April 8, 2015	47
An episode about Marnie, an Instagram-famous dog. Guest starring Shirley Braha. Also featuring a segment on Email Debt Forgiveness Day.
20	"I Want To Break Free"	April 15, 2015	38
An episode of Yes Yes No about Joyce Carol Oates and Chuck Grassley. Also featuring a segment on Email Debt Forgiveness Day.
21	"Hack the Police"	April 22, 2015	38
An episode interviewing Higinio Ochoa, a man who hacked into a police computer system and the consequences he faces as a result.
22	"Bonus: The Man Who Refused To Email"	May 4, 2015	43
An episode about Mat Honan, an employee from BuzzFeed who refuses to use personal email. Also featuring a segment on Email Debt Forgiveness Day.
23	"Exit & Return, Part I"	May 7, 2015	43
The first part of a two-part series about a young Hasidic Jewish man from New Square, New York who discovers the Internet. Featuring Sruthi Pinnamaneni.
24	"Exit & Return, Part II"	May 14, 2015	53
The second part of a two-part series about a young Hasidic Jewish man from New Square, New York who discovers the Internet. Featuring Sruthi Pinnamaneni.
25	"Favor Atender"	May 20, 2015	47
An episode about communicating with the head of states, such as Rafael Correa.
26	"Craigslist, Horsley's List"	May 27, 2015	35
An episode responding to two Craigslist ads. This is the first episode with the "Ten Minutes on Craigslist" segment. Also featuring a segment interviewing a woman on Neal Horsley's hitlist of abortion clinics.
27	"The Fever"	June 4, 2015	24
An episode about online dating and Asian fetishes. Guest starring Stephanie Foo.
28	"Shipped to Timbuktu"	June 18, 2015	27
An episode about "cookie advisors" and wrong emails. Also an episode of Yes Yes No about Adam West.
29	"The Takeover"	June 25, 2015	15
An episode about a Facebook group run by teenagers roleplaying as office workers. Guest starring Karen Duffin.
30	"The Man in the FBI Hat"	July 1, 2015	10
An episode about a fugitive on the run for the over a decade and his popular Internet entrepreneur alter-ego.
31	"Bonus: The Reddit Implosion Explainer"	July 9, 2015	14
An episode of Yes Yes No about Reddit and Victoria Taylor's firing.
32	"The Evilest Technology On Earth :-)"	July 15, 2015	25
An episode about a hacker releasing information from a company that sells surveillance software to governments around the world. Also a Yes Yes No about Minion memes.
33	"@ISIS"	July 22, 2015	22
An episode about Rukmini Callimachi of The New York Times, and her ability to communicate with Islamic extremists online. Also the first episode featuring Super Tech Support, this one about housecleaning apps.
34	"DMV Nation"	August 6, 2015	32
An episode about Clay Johnson and the outdatedness of government websites.
35	"One Strike"	August 12, 2015	40
An episode of Ten Minutes on Craigslist. Also a segment with Barry Crimmins about AOL chatrooms. Featuring Sylvie Douglis.
36	"Today's the Day"	August 27, 2015	32
An episode where P. J. Vogt and Alex Goldman go outside and record what goes on.
37	"Taking Power"	September 3, 2015	41
An episode about Comcast and their issues with a customer's Tweet. Also, an episode of Yes Yes No about a Vine related to toy ducks.
38	"Undo, Undo, Undo"	September 9, 2015	46
An episode of Yes Yes No with Alix Spiegel and Lulu Miller about the Berenstain Bears and the Mandela effect. Also the first episode with the "Undo Undo Undo" segment, where listeners call in about things they should not have sent.
39	"Reply All Exploder"	September 16, 2015	56
An episode where Hrishikesh Hirway of the Song Exploder podcast interviews Breakmaster Cylinder.
40	"The Flower Child"	September 24, 2015	27
An episode about the Ripoff Report website and a taxidermist. Featuring Sruthi Pinnamaneni.
41	"What It Looks Like"	October 7, 2015	45
An episode with Jamie Lauren Keiles about depression. Also an episode of Yes Yes No about Zoë Quinn and GamerGate. Also featuring a segment on Email Debt Forgiveness Day.
42	"Blind Spot"	October 14, 2015	47
An episode about a woman who has a mysterious medical condition and her attempts to figure out what it is. Featuring Sruthi Pinnamaneni.
43	"The Law That Sticks"	October 28, 2015	58
An episode about the Computer Fraud and Abuse Act and Matthew Keys.
44	"Shine On You Crazy Goldman"	November 5, 2015	49
An episode about tripsitting, and microdosing LSD. Featuring Phia Bennin.
45	"The Rainbow Pug"	November 12, 2015	55
An episode of Super Tech Support trying to find where a missing pug went.
46	"Yik Yak Returns"	November 18, 2015	54
A follow-up to episode 9 about the racism on the app Yik Yak at Colgate University.
47	"Quit Already!"	December 3, 2015	60
An episode about political debates on Facebook, involving Roxana Baldetti and Otto Pérez Molina.
48	"I Love You, I Loathe You"	December 9, 2015	40
An episode of Yes Yes No about Jeff Jarvis. Also featuring the "Undo Undo Undo" segment with calls from listeners about their accidental messages they regret leaving.
49	"Past, Present, Future"	December 16, 2015	44
Updates on past shows. Covers episodes 1, 2, 4, 6, 15, 19, 21, 26, 29, 35, 36, 42, and 44. Featuring Sruthi Pinnamaneni and Phia Bennin.
50	"The Cathedral"	January 7, 2016	5
The story behind the creation of the game, "That Dragon, Cancer". Featuring Sruthi Pinnamaneni.
51	"Perfect Crime"	January 14, 2016	8
An episode about the play "Perfect Crime", interviewing lead actress Catherine Russell. Also featuring an interview with host of Gimlet Media show "Sampler", Brittany Luse.
52	"Raising the Bar"	January 22, 2016	14
An episode of Yes Yes No about BB-8 and the Manosphere. Also an interview with former Twitter engineer Leslie Miley and Adam Davidson of Planet Money.
53	"In The Desert"	February 4, 2016	37
An episode of Super Tech Support about how one couple's house is the default location for Find My Phone apps.
54	"Apologies to Dr. Rosalind Franklin"	February 10, 2016	39
An episode following up to erroneous comments made about the discovery of the double helix and Rosalind Franklin's contributions to said discovery, in episode 52.
55	"The Line"	February 18, 2016	38
An episode about the Internet, The Church of Jesus Christ of Latter-day Saints, John Dehlin, Hans Mattsson. Guest starring Karen Duffin.
56	"Zardulu"	February 25, 2016	38
An episode looking into Zardulu and Pizza Rat. Also a Yes Yes No about the 2016 Democratic Party presidential primaries, and Super Mario 64 Speedrunning.
57	"Milk Wanted"	March 9, 2016	38
An episode about the world of breast milk sales. Featuring Phia Bennin.
58	"Earth Pony"	March 17, 2016	-
An interview with election forecaster Carl Diggler about Superforecasters. An episode of Yes Yes No covering infinite recursion and Fallout Equestria. Guest starring Jason Mantzoukas.
59	"Good Job, Alex"	March 23, 2016	55
An episode of Super Tech Support where Alex Goldman attempts to regain an author's domain name. Also featuring a segment on Email Debt Forgiveness Day.
60	"A Simple Question"	March 31, 2016	60
An episode of Super Tech Support about an attempt to get Verizon Fios.
61	"Baby King"	April 14, 2016	58
An episode of Yes Yes No about weird GIFs and Genius.
62	"Decoders"	April 21, 2016	67
An episode featuring an interview about ISIS members online. Also an episode of Yes Yes No about Adam West.
63	"1000 Brimes"	April 27, 2016	45
An episode about Email Debt Forgiveness Day. Featuring Phia Bennin.
64	"On The Inside"	May 12, 2016	54
The first part of a four-part series by Sruthi Pinnamaneni about Paul Modrowski's blog from the inside of prison.
65	"On the Inside, Part II"	May 19, 2016	47
The second part of a four-part series by Sruthi Pinnamaneni about Paul Modrowski's blog from the inside of prison.
66	"On the Inside, Part III"	May 26, 2016	42
The third part of a four-part series by Sruthi Pinnamaneni about Paul Modrowski's blog from the inside of prison.
67	"On the Inside, Part IV"	June 9, 2016	30
The fourth part of a four-part series by Sruthi Pinnamaneni about Paul Modrowski's blog from the inside of prison.
68	"Vampire Rules"	June 16, 2016	34
An episode of Super Tech Support about a mysterious Tinder picture, and an episode of Yes Yes No about Hillary Clinton.
69	"Disappeared"	July 7, 2016	57
The story of npm, Azer Koçulu, and how he broke the Internet. Also a follow-up to the Yes Yes No from episode 68. Featuring Sruthi Pinnamaneni.
70	"Stolen Valor"	July 15, 2016	33
An episode looking into the world of stolen valor.
71	"The Picture Taker"	July 27, 2016	13
An episode of Super Tech Support, about the former picture hosting site Picturelife.
72	"Dead is Paul"	August 3, 2016	30
An episode of Yes Yes No about Harambe and Marina Joyce.
73	"Sandbox"	August 11, 2016	47
A twin hooks her organs to the Internet for her sister's peace of mind. Featuring P. J. Vogt's mother and aunt.
74	"Making Friends"	August 24, 2016	56
A depressed woman hears a voice in her head known as a Tulpa and is integrated into that community.
75	"Boy Wonder"	August 31, 2016	58
An episode about a mysterious medical malady. Featuring Sruthi Pinnamaneni.
76	"Lost in a Cab"	September 7, 2016	57
A woman loses her camera in an NYC taxicab. Google sends her to a fake website.
77	"The Grand Tapestry Of Pepe"	September 21, 2016	81
An episode of Yes Yes No about Pepe the Frog and a follow-up to episode 71 involving PictureLife and SmugMug.
78	"Very Quickly to the Drill"	September 29, 2016	59
A follow-up investigation to episode 76 about Google AdWords and locksmithing.
79	"Boy in Photo"	October 13, 2016	57
A dive into who exactly is in a photograph that an Internet forum obsessed over. Featuring Sruthi Pinnamaneni.
80	"Flash"	October 26, 2016	55
An episode of Yes Yes No about electoral maps and Loss.jpg. A second segment covers a missing tortoise named Flash. Featuring Damiano Marchetti.
81	"In the Tall Grass"	November 3, 2016	69
An episode interviewing the creator of the Click Together app and Matt Furie.
82	"Hello?"	November 17, 2016	69
A call-in episode. Topics covered include but are not limited to Matt Farley, Lewis Powell, Nichiren Buddhism, a World of Warcraft love triangle. Guest starring Matt Farley.
83	"Voyage Into Pizzagate"	December 8, 2016	30
An episode of Yes Yes No about the Pizzagate conspiracy theory, also covering r/The_Donald.
84	"Past, Present, Future 2"	December 22, 2016	49
Updates on past shows. Covers episodes 47, 53, 56, 57, 60, 61, 64 through 67, 68, 69, 76, 78, and 83. Featuring Sruthi Pinnamaneni, Phia Bennin, and Damiano Marchetti.
85	"The Reversal"	January 12, 2017	9
One man's search for ALS reversals. Featuring Sruthi Pinnamaneni.
86	"Man of the People"	January 19, 2017	12
The story of J. R. Brinkley.
87	"Storming the Castle"	February 2, 2017	68
An interview with Longmont Potion Castle. Featuring Sruthi Pinnamaneni.
88	"Second Language"	February 9, 2017	65
An episode of Yes Yes No covering Norm Kelly. Sruthi Pinnamaneni interviews an ALS patient who can only communicate via eye movement and a computer monitor. Featuring Sruthi Pinnamaneni.
89	"Worldstar"	February 23, 2017	87
The story of the popular website WorldStarHipHop and following up on a missing tortoise from episode 80. Featuring Damiano Marchetti.
90	"Matt Lieber Goes To Dinner"	March 2, 2017	86
The future of DRM, the W3C, and copyright protection on the Internet. In addition, a set-up to episode 96. Featuring Phia Bennin.
91	"The Russian Passenger"	March 16, 2017	73
An episode of Super Tech Support about how Alex Blumberg's Uber account was hacked.
92	"Favor Atender: The Return"	March 23, 2017	79
A rebroadcast of episode 25 with a new chapter added.
93	"Beware All"	April 6, 2017	63
A follow-up to episode 91's investigation into how Alex Blumberg's Uber account was hacked. Featuring Phia Bennin.
94	"Obfuscation"	April 12, 2017	62
An episode about how to hide personal information from Internet service providers. Also featuring a segment on Email Debt Forgiveness Day.
95	"The Silence in the Sky"	April 27, 2017	70
A Russian billionaire funds a project to send a message out to extraterrestrial life. Scientists discuss what that message should be. A corporate attorney moderates family Thanksgiving dinners. Also featuring a segment on Email Debt Forgiveness Day. Featuring Damiano Marchetti.
96	"The Secret Life of Alex Goldman"	May 3, 2017	68
Alex Goldman uses a phone with spyware installed, allowing P. J. Vogt to see what he does.
97	"What Kind of Idiot Gets Phished"	May 18, 2017	59
Producer Phia Bennin attempts to phish Alex Blumberg in order to discover the type of person who gets phished. Featuring Phia Bennin.
98	"Fog of Covfefe"	June 8, 2017	-
An episode of Yes Yes No covering a tweet related to Covfefe.
99	"Black Hole, New Jersey"	June 15, 2017	30
An episode about how numerous items get redirected from purchasers on sites such as Poshmark and eBay to a warehouse in New Jersey. Featuring Phia Bennin.
100	"Friends and Blasphemers"	June 29, 2017	70
An episode about LiveJournal and Russian anti-Putin activists.
101	"Minka"	July 13, 2017	76
An episode about Bill Thomas, the man who worked behind creating the first retirement homes, and his search for redemption. Featuring Sruthi Pinnamaneni.
102	"Long Distance"	July 27, 2017	36
The first episode of a two-part series about how a phone scammer calls Alex Goldman. Featuring Damiano Marchetti.
103	"Long Distance, Part II"	August 3, 2017	18
The second episode of a two-part series about how a phone scammer calls Alex Goldman. Featuring Damiano Marchetti.
104	"The Case of the Phantom Caller"	September 7, 2017	45
An episode of Super Tech Support about a woman who receives phone calls from unknown numbers and hears snippets of their lives.
105	"At World's End"	September 21, 2017	52
Phia Bennin looks into where an online Adobe Flash game, "Bunni: How We First Met" went. Featuring Phia Bennin.
106	"Is That You, KD?"	September 28, 2017	69
An episode of Yes Yes No about James Damore. Also features the first segment of Sports Sports Sports about Enes Kanter and Kevin Durant.
107	"The Skip Tracer, Part I"	October 19, 2017	74
The first part of a two-episode about bounty hunters. Featuring Sruthi Pinnamaneni.
108	"The Skip Tracer, Part II"	October 19, 2017	74
The second part of a two-episode about bounty hunters. Featuring Sruthi Pinnamaneni.
109	"Is Facebook Spying on You?"	November 2, 2017	53
An investigation into whether or not Facebook uses the microphone on a cell phone to deliver ads related to what the user says.
110	"The Antifa Supersoldier Spectacular"	November 16, 2017	69
An episode of Yes Yes No about Antifa and Constable Frozen.
111	"The Return of the Russian Passenger"	December 7, 2017	60
A sequel to episode 91, continuing the investigation into how Alex Blumberg's Uber account was hacked. Featuring Phia Bennin.
112	"The Prophet"	December 15, 2017	60
A reporter's pleas for justice after being assaulted in Mexico unexpectedly puts her in conflict with a troll army under the employ of Enrique Peña Nieto.
113	"Reply All's Year End Extravaganza"	December 21, 2017	50
Updates on past shows. Covers episodes 77, 82, 83, 84, 88, 98, 99, 102, 104, 107, and 109. Featuring Phia Bennin.
114	"Apocalypse Soon"	January 18, 2018	70
An episode of Yes Yes No. Topics discussed: Tide Pod challenge, Ugandan Knuckles, Logan Paul suicide video, Somebody Toucha My Spaghet meme.
115	"The Bitcoin Hunter"	January 31, 2018	58
An episode of Super Tech Support about Jia Tolentino's missing Bitcoin. Featuring Damiano Marchetti.
116	"Trust the Process"	February 15, 2018	76
A follow-up to episode 115 about domination via controlling someone else's computer. Also featuring Sports Sports Sports about Joel Embiid. Featuring Sruthia Pinnamaneni.
117	"The World's Most Expensive Free Watch"	March 1, 2018	-
A man orders a watch from an Instagram ad and discovers the story behind dropshipping.
118	"A Pirate In Search of a Judge"	March 15, 2018	92
An investigation into why a person received a copyright violation notice from their Internet service provider.
119	"No More Safe Harbor"	April 20, 2018	91
P. J. and Alex examine the laws banning backpage.com and its consequences.
120	"INVCEL"	May 10, 2018	-
The story of the Canadian queer woman who began the first incel website.
121	"Pain Funnel"	May 17, 2018	-
The troubling practices of drug rehabilitation centers in the United States. Featuring Sruthi Pinnamaneni.
122	"The QAnon Code"	June 7, 2018	98
An episode of Yes Yes No about QAnon.
123	"An Ad for the Worst Day of Your Life"	June 21, 2018	62
Photos of Matt Logelin and his dead wife mysteriously begin appearing in advertisements around the Internet. P. J. and Alex investigate why.
124	"The Magic Store"	July 11, 2018	76
Sruthi Pinnamaneni buys a disappointing toothbrush off Amazon and decides to investigate the website's quality decline in recent years. Featuring Sruthi Pinnamaneni.
125	"All My Pets"	July 26, 2018	89
An episode about Taylor Nicole Dean's YouTube pet channel and the concept of "Pet YouTubers". Featuring Sruthi Pinnamaneni.
126	"Alex Jones Dramageddon"	September 13, 2018	-
An episode of Yes Yes No about Alex Jones' visit to the United States Senate.
127	"The Crime Machine, Part I"	October 11, 2018	-
The first episode in a two-part series covering the story of Jack Maple and the creation of COMPSTAT.
128	"The Crime Machine, Part II"	October 12, 2018	-
The second episode in a two-part series covering the story of Jack Maple and the creation of COMPSTAT.
129	"Autumn"	October 25, 2018	89
A woman uses the computer game The Sims to cope with her grandmother's death.
130	"The Snapchat Thief"	November 8, 2018	59
An episode investigating how a Snapchat account was stolen and sold on the Dark web.
131	"Surefire Investigations"	November 15, 2018	71
An episode of Yes Yes No about Gritty and Jacob Wohl.
132	"Negative Mount Pleasant"	December 6, 2018	71
A look at the local government disputes over the construction of a Foxconn plant in Mount Pleasant, Wisconsin. Featuring Sruthi Pinnamaneni.
133	"Reply All's 2018 Year End Extravaganza"	December 20, 2018	71
Updates on past shows. Covers episodes 130, 127, 128, 119, 122, 126, 82, 129, 83, 84, 109, 125, 112, 115, 123, 113, 104, 120, 114, 75, and 57. Featuring Phia Bennin and Damiano Marchetti.
134	"The Year of the Wallop"	January 17, 2019	97
An episode of Yes Yes No. Topics discussed: Pottermore's claims about sanitation in the Harry Potter universe, Charles C. Johnson. Guest starring Jason Mantzoukas.
135	"Robocall: Bang Bang"	January 31, 2019	67
An episode investigating robocalls. Featuring Phia Bennin and Damiano Marchetti.
136	"The Founder"	February 14, 2019	91
A look at the life of Paul Le Roux, computer programmer turned criminal mastermind.
137	"Fool's Trade"	February 28, 2019	99
An episode of Yes Yes No covering Natalie Portman and Jonathan Safran Foer, The Knicks and its owner's musical misadventures.
138	"The Great Momo Panic"	March 14, 2019	67
An observation of YouTube Kids' influx of strange challenges and bizarre horror content, including the supposed demon Momo. Guest starring Katie Notopoulos. Featuring Phia Bennin and Damiano Marchetti.
139	"The Reply All Hotline"	March 28, 2019	-
A call-in episode. Topics covered are tech-support related.
140	"The Roman Mars Mazda Virus"	April 11, 2019	70
Super Tech Support investigates one fan's problem with listening to a favorite podcast, 99% Invisible in his new Mazda car.
141	"Adam Pisces and the $2 Coke"	April 25, 2019	89
An investigation into strange Domino's Pizza orders lead to the mysterious world of pizzajacking. Featuring Damiano Marchetti.
142	"We Didn't Start The Fire"	May 23, 2019	58
An episode of Yes Yes No that explores the world of cancel culture to the tune of Billy Joel's "We Didn't Start The Fire." Also, an update to episode 139, where a Syrian refugee seeks a college education in Canada.
143	"Permanent Record"	June 13, 2019	61
A call-in episode. Topics covered include various embarrassing moments on the Internet. Featuring Phia Bennin.
144	"Dark Pattern"	June 27, 2019	94
An episode about how the confluence of the IRS, Congress, and TurboTax all work together to prevent people from utilizing a free tax return filing service. Guest starring Justin Elliott.
145	"Louder"	July 11, 2019	-
An episode covering the feud between Carlos Maza and Steven Crowder. Guest starring Carlos Maza.
146	"Summer Hotline"	July 25, 2019	-
A call-in episode. Topics covered are tech-support related.
147	"The Woman in the Air Conditioner"	September 12, 2019	-
P. J. and Alex investigate strange air conditioner sounds from a relaxation app.
148	"Bedbugs and Aliens"	September 26, 2019	71
An episode of Yes Yes No about the Area 51 raid and a controversy involving Bret Stephens and an insult on Twitter.
149	"30-50 Feral Hogs"	October 10, 2019	66
An episode about a viral tweet about feral hogs.
150	"The Reply All Halloween Scream-A-Thon"	November 2, 2019	-
A call-in episode. Topics covered include but are not limited to ghosts, seances, and the Mysterious Sax Man of Berkeley. Featuring Phia Bennin and Damiano Marchetti.
151	"Thank You for Noticing"	November 14, 2019	94
A listener discovers a UFO in the Google Maps image for a local store. Alex Goldman investigates. Featuring Jessica Yung.
152	"The Real Enemy, Part 1"	December 13, 2019	66
The first episode in a three-part series covering infighting in the Alabama Democratic Party. Featuring Emmanuel Dzotsi and Sruthi Pinnamaneni.
153	"The Real Enemy, Part 2"	December 13, 2019	66
The second episode in a three-part series covering infighting in the Alabama Democratic Party. Featuring Emmanuel Dzotsi and Sruthi Pinnamaneni.
154	"The Real Enemy, Part 3"	December 13, 2019	66
The third episode in a three-part series covering infighting in the Alabama Democratic Party. Featuring Emmanuel Dzotsi and Sruthi Pinnamaneni.
155	"Friendship Village"	January 6, 2020	74
An episode of Yes Yes No about the 2020 election and Teen Vogue, a TikTok star who disappeared, and the viral dances used by the Pete Buttigieg and Michael Bloomberg 2020 Democratic primary campaigns.
156	"The Cure for Everything"	January 30, 2020	77
A call-in episode. Topics covered include but are not limited to Waze and a potential cure for baldness.
157	"Pierre Delecto and the Spooky Adventure"	February 20, 2020	100
A new segment called "Deep Dive" about Pierre Delecto, and the editing of the Pete Buttigieg Wikipedia page. Guest starring Ashley Feinberg.
158	"The Case of the Missing Hit"	March 5, 2020	85
An episode of Super Tech Support case in which a pop song from the 90's cannot be found anywhere on the Internet.
159	"The Attic and Closet Show"	March 20, 2020	-
A call-in episode. Topics covered include but are not limited to the COVID-19 pandemic.
160	"The Attic and Closet Show 2"	March 30, 2020	78
A call-in episode. Topics covered include but are not limited to the COVID-19 pandemic.
161	"Brian vs. Brian"	May 13, 2020	-
An episode of Super Tech Support about a man who recorded a Christmas song in his living room and heard it in the grocery store years later.
162	"The Least You Could Do"	June 18, 2020	-
An episode covering a trend where white people Venmo black people money following the George Floyd protests. Featuring Emmanuel Dzotsi.
163	"Candidate One"	July 2, 2020	70
Insight into an election at Berkeley High School where bribery and other corruption occurred and was discovered by a 17 year old kid. Featuring Damiano Marchetti.
164	"Long Distance: The Real Alex Martin"	July 16, 2020	98
An episode about new insight into the inner workings of a call center scam; follow-up of episodes 102 & 103. Featuring Sruthi Pinnamaneni.
165	"The Mold and The Beautiful"	July 30, 2020	49
An episode of Yes Yes No about the Wayfair child sex trafficking conspiracy theory and the Sqirl moldy jam scandal. Guest starring Jason Mantzoukas.
166	"Country of Liars"	September 18, 2020	83
An investigation into the history and identity of QAnon.
167	"America's Hottest Talkline"	October 1, 2020	72
An episode about how a numerous phone numbers get hijacked by odd recordings. Featuring Emmanuel Dzotsi.
168	"Happiness Calculator vs. Alex Goldman"	October 29, 2020	59
An episode interviewing Peter Dodds, who, with Chris Danforth, created a hedonometer to judge the relative happiness of a nation.
169	"The Confetti Cannon"	November 12, 2020	63
A call-in episode. Topics covered include but are not limited to the 2020 United States presidential election. Featuring Emmanuel Dzotsi.
170	"A Song of Impotent Rage"	December 17, 2020	100
An episode where Alex Goldman writes a song about his frustrations with climate change and the perceived lack of a response to it. Guest starring Hrishikesh Hirway.
171	"Account Suspended"	January 15, 2021	93
An episode about the punishment of Donald Trump's social media accounts, the 2021 storming of the United States Capitol, and a follow-up to episode 170 featuring Alex Blumberg.
172	"The Test Kitchen, Part One"	February 4, 2021	42
Titled "Original Sin"; the first part of a four-part series by Sruthi Pinnamaneni looking into the allegations of racism with the Bon Appétit YouTube channel, "The Test Kitchen".
173	"The Test Kitchen, Part Two"	February 12, 2021	28
Titled "Glass Office"; the second part of a four-part series by Sruthi Pinnamaneni looking into the allegations of racism with the Bon Appétit YouTube channel, "The Test Kitchen". The series was cancelled after this episode.
-	"The Test Kitchen, Revisited"	April 29, 2021	64
The Reply All team does a retrospective on the failed "Test Kitchen" series.
174	"Search Party"	June 10, 2021	-
The Reply All team discusses their search histories. This is the first segment of the "Don't You Wish You Were Incognito" segment. Guest starring Ashley Feinberg and Katie Notopoulos.
175	"This Website Will Self Destruct"	June 24, 2021	-
An episode about the website that deletes itself after not receiving messages for 24 hours.
176	"Twicarus"	July 8, 2021	-
An episode of Super Tech Support about a Twitter account with no handle or account name. Featuring Phia Bennin.
177	"Gleeks and Gurgles"	July 22, 2021	-
An episode about TikTok's algorithm.
178	"I Am Not a Bot"	September 2, 2021	-
An episode about Alex Goldman's time with Team Fortress 2.
179	"Pandemic Be Damned"	September 16, 2021	-
A call-in episode. Topics covered include but are not limited to the COVID-19 pandemic.
180	"Who's Going?"	October 14, 2021	-
An episode about TikTok user Adrian Lopez's birthday party. Guest starring Taylor Lorenz.
181	"Absolutely Devious Lick"	October 28, 2021	-
An episode about TikTok's "Devious Lick" challenge.
182	"State of Panic"	December 16, 2021	-
An episode investigating into whether or not the Florida Governor's press secretary, Christina Pushaw, is using bots on Twitter.
183	"The Venova King"	March 10, 2022	-
An episode of Super Tech Support investigating why a certain artist keeps showing up in someone's Spotify.
184	"Alex Goldman, Demon Hunter"	March 17, 2022	-
An episode of Super Tech Support investigating why a certain picture keeps showing up in someone's 2016 Toyota Prius.
185	"The Rainbow Chain"	March 17, 2022	-
An episode of Super Tech Support investigating why someone's non-fungible token art was stolen.
186	"The Contact List"	April 21, 2022	-
An episode where Emmanuel calls every single contact on his list.
187	"Flying the Coop"	May 12, 2022	-
An episode involving a Facebook group about chickens that gets invaded by cryptocurrency users.
188	"Into the Depths"	May 12, 2022	-
An episode inspired by the Depths of Wikipedia involving the show's producers explaining articles they found interesting, including "cute aggression", the Pittsburgh toilet, and the drama over a picture of Guy Standing, sitting.
189	"Goodbye All"	June 23, 2022	-
An episode summarizing the show, answering some last few questions listeners had. Featuring Breakmaster Cylinder.
