= List of music podcasts =

The following is a list of music podcasts.

== List ==
Podcast	Year	Host(s)	Produced by	Ref
Above the Basement	2016–present	Chuck Clough and Ronnie Hirschberg	Independent	
The Adam Buxton Podcast	2015–present	Adam Buxton	Independent	
All Songs Considered	2018–present	Bob Boilen and Robin Hilton	NPR	
Amy Schumer Presents: 3 Girls, 1 Keith	2018–present	Amy Schumer, Bridget Everett, Rachel Feinstein, and Keith Robinson	Spotify Studios	
And the Writer Is...		Ross Golan	Big Deal Music / Mega House Music	
Are and Be			Spotify Studios	
The Art Of Process		Ted Leo and Aimee Mann	Maximum Fun	
Bandsplain	2021– present	Yasi Salek	The Ringer	
Bandtastic	2019	Drennon Davis and Mike Phirman	Himalaya Media	
Brainwashed Podcast	2004–present	Various	Independent	
Broken Record	2017–present	Rick Rubin, Malcolm Gladwell, Bruce Headlam and Justin Richmond	Pushkin Industries	
Bugeye’s Rock Pop Rambles	2020–present	Angela Martin, Paula Snow, Kerrie Smith, and Grace Healy	Independent	
California Love	2020–present	LAist Studios	Spotify Studios	
Centuries of Sound	2017–present	James Errington	Independent	
City Soundtracks	2017	Hrishikesh Hirway	Google Play Music	
Clarify	2013–2017		Spotify Studios, Mic, and Headcount.org	
Classical Kids Storytime	2018–present	Various	American Public Media	
Cocaine & Rhinestones	2017–present	Tyler Mahan Coe	Independent	
Country Shine with Graham Bunn	2020–present	Graham Bunn and Camryn Irwin	Spotify Studios	
Coverville	2004–present	Brian Ibbott	Independent	
David Walliams' Marvellous Musical Podcast	2019	David Walliams	Classic FM	
David's out for a Good Time	2018–2019	David Olshanetsky and Naledi Dube	Spotify Studios	
Desert Island Discs	2002–present	Roy Plomley, Michael Parkinson, Sue Lawley, Kirsty Young, and Lauren Laverne	BBC	
Destroy! The influence of punk.	2024–present	Richard Smith	BRB Studios	
Disgraceland	2018–present	Jake Brennan	Amazon	
Dissect	2018–present	Cole Cuchna	Spotify Studios	
Dolly Parton's America	2019	Jad Abumrad	WNYC Studios	
Elevenses	2020–present	Danielle Perry	Bauer Media	
Fabcast	2016-Present	Howie Edelson and Stephen Bard	Independent	
Fest and Flauschig	2016–2021	Jan Böhmermann and Olli Schulz	Spotify Studios	
A Folk Song a Day	2010-2011	Jon Boden	Independent	
Hip Hop Saved My Life		Romesh Ranganathan	RangaBee Productions and Mr Box	
A History of Rock Music in 500 Songs	2018–present	Andrew Hickey	Independent	
Hit Parade	2017–present	Chris Molanphy	Slate Podcasts	
Jacked: Rise of the New Jack Sound	2020–present	Taraji P. Henson	Universal Music Group & Wondery	
James Acaster’s Perfect Sounds	2020–present	James Acaster	BBC Radio	
The Joe Budden Podcast	2015–present	Joe Budden	Spotify and independent starting in 2020	
Lost Notes	2018–2020	Hanif Abdurraqib	Spotify Studios & KCRW	
Louder Than A Riot	2020–present	Rodney Carmichael and Sidney Madden	NPR	
LSQ		Jenny Eliscu	Independent	
Made in Medellín	2020–present	J. Balvin	Spotify Studios	
The Messenger	2021–present	Abbas Hamad	Spotify Studios & Dreamville	
Microphone Check	2018–2019	Frannie Kelley and Ali Shaheed Muhammad	Spotify Studios	
The MJCast	2015–present	Jamon Bull and Elise Capron	Independent	
Mogul	2017–2020	Brandon Jenkins	Gimlet and Spotify Studios	
MotoGP	2020–present	Steve English and Alberto Naska	Spotify & Dorna Sports	
The Music Box: Global Explorations	2017–present	Faith Murphy	Louisville Public Media	
Music Business Worldwide	2015–present	Music Business Worldwide	Music Business Worldwide	
Music History Project	2017-present	Dan Del Fiorentino	NAMM	
The Music Podcast for Kids	2019–present	Bill Henry and Bruce Fite	Mr. Henry's Music World	
My 90s Playlist	2020–present	Tracy Clayton and Akoto Ofori-Atta	Sony Music & Multitude	
No Effects	2014–2018	Jesse Cohen	Independent	
Noodle Loaf	2018–present	Dan Saks	Independent	
OTHERtone with Pharrell, Scott, and Fam-Lay	2020–present	Pharrell Williams	OTHERtone	
Pitch		Whitney Jones and Alex Kapelman		
Popcast	2015–present	Knox McCoy and Jamie Golden	Wondery	
Punch Up the Jam	2017–2022	Miel Bredouw, Demi Adejuyigbe, Andrew and Evan Gregory	Headgum	
Questlove Supreme	2019–present	Ahmir Khalib Thompson	iHeartRadio	
Rap Radar Podcast		Elliott Wilson	Rap Radar	
Riffs On Riffs	2018–present	Joe Watson and Toby Brazwell	Evergreen Podcasts	
The Ringer Music Show	2020–present	Charles Holmes and Grace Spelman	Spotify Studios & The Ringer	
Rolling Stone: Music Now	2016–present	Various	Rolling Stone	
Saturday Morning Cereal Bowl	2020–present	Dave Loftin	Independent	
Shaking out the numb	2020	Sylvan Esso	Art19	
Showstopper	2017–2018	Naomi Zeichner	Spotify Studios & FannieCo	
Song Exploder	2014–present	Hrishikesh Hirway and Thao Nguyen	Independent	
Song vs. Song	2019–present	Todd Nathanson	Independent	
Soul Stories	2020–present	Kemp Powers	Spotify Studios & Disney	
Spare the Rock, Spoil the Child	2009–present	Bill Childs, Ella Childs, and Liam Childs	WGC	
Speed of Sound	2020–present	Steve Greensberg	iHeartRadio	
Switched on Pop	2014–present	Nate Sloan and Chris Harding	Vulture	
Tales From No Man’s Land	2019	Frank Turner	Xtra Mile Recordings and Somethin' Else Productions	
Talkhouse	2014–present	Elia Einhorn	Talkhouse Media	
Tape Notes	2017–present	John Kennedy	In The Woods	
They Might Be Giants Podcast	2014–2019	They Might Be Giants	Independent	
Tiny Desk Concerts	2017–present	Bob Boilen	NPR	
Transmissions: The Definitive Story of Joy Division & New Order	2020	Joy Division / New Order	Spotify Studios	
Under Cover	2018–2019		Spotify Studios	
Unpacked	2017–present	Micah Tatebe	Spotify Studios	
Washed Up Emo	2011–present	Tom Mullen	Independent	
Wind of Change	2020–present	Jon Favreau, Jon Lovett, and Tommy Vietor	Spotify Studios, Pineapple Street Studios, and Crooked Media	
Your Favorite Band Sucks	2017–present	Mark Mosley and Tyler Mahan Coe	Independent	
The Zane Lowe Interview Series	2019–present	Zane Lowe	Apple Music	

== See also ==
- Music
- Music radio
- Popular music
- List of popular music genres
