= Eulogy (disambiguation) =

A eulogy is a speech in praise of someone, typically someone that has recently died.

Eulogy or Eulogies may also refer to:

== Places ==
- Eulogy, Mississippi, a community in the United States

== Film and television ==
- Eulogy (film) a 2004 comedy film directed by Michael Clancy
- "Eulogy", a season 2 episode of Sanctuary
- "Eulogy", a season 1 episode of the 2018 reboot of Lost in Space
- "Eulogy" (Black Mirror), an episode of the seventh series of Black Mirror

== Music ==
- Eulogy Recordings, a music label specializing in hardcore punk bands
- Eulogies (band), an indie-rock band from Los Angeles
- Eulogies (Eulogies album), their 2007 self-titled debut album
- Eulogies (Wolves at the Gate album), 2022 album
- Eulogy, composition for viola and eight instruments by Mark-Anthony Turnage

=== Songs ===
- "Eulogy", a song by Tool from Ænima
- "Eulogy", a song by Saves the Day from their 2006 album Sound the Alarm
- "Eulogy", a song by Gang Starr from their 2003 album The Ownerz
- "Eulogy", a song by Judas Priest from their 2005 album Angel of Retribution
- "Eulogy Song", a song performed by Andrew Hansen on the TV show The Chaser's War on Everything
- "Eulogy", a song by Frank Turner on his 2011 album England Keep My Bones
- "Eulogy", by Suicideboys from their 2022 album Sing Me a Lullaby, My Sweet Temptation
- "Eulogy", a song by Grandson from his 2023 album I Love You, I'm Trying
- "Eulogy", a song by Joey Badass from the 2022 album 2000

== Other uses ==
- Eulogy Recordings, American independent record label

== See also ==
- Eulogia
