= List of rewatch podcasts =

A rewatch podcast is a podcast hosted by cast members (sometimes leads, sometimes supporting actors) and/or crew members (such as writers or directors) of a popular television show or film series where they "rewatch" and discuss past episodes or installments.

== List ==
Podcast	Television show(s) or film series	Host(s)	Start date
The Pondcast	Doctor Who	Karen Gillan, Arthur Darvill	TBA
A Full Circle	Stargate SG-1	Michael Shanks, David Read	October 17, 2026
A Different World View with Darryl & Kadeem	A Different World	Darryl M. Bell, Kadeem Hardison	October 15, 2026
Countdown to Avengers: Doomsday Official Podcast	Marvel Cinematic Universe	Iman Vellani, Frank Alvarez	August 27, 2026
Podlandia: A-O Rewatch	Portlandia	Fred Armisen, Carrie Brownstein	July 16, 2026
Still Hot in Cleveland	Hot in Cleveland	Valerie Bertinelli, Todd Milliner	June 17, 2026
Blocc Party: An Insecure Podcast	Insecure	Issa Rae, Prentice Penny	May 13, 2026
Best of Both Our Worlds	Hannah Montana	Jason Earles, Douglas Lieblein, Shannon Flynn	March 17, 2026
Who Needs? A My Boys Rewatch Podcast	My Boys	Jamie Kaler, Michael Bunin	February 10, 2026
How We Got Away with Murder	How to Get Away with Murder	Jack Falahee, Matt McGorry	January 22, 2026
Welcome to the Family	Family Matters	Telma Hopkins, Kellie Shanygne Williams	November 5, 2025
Viva Betty	Ugly Betty	Ana Ortiz, Mark Indelicato	October 2, 2025
The TV Police	The Mentalist	Owain Yeoman, Tim Kang	September 30, 2025
Desperately Devoted	Desperate Housewives	Teri Hatcher, Andrea Bowen, Emerson Tenney	September 9, 2025
DeGrads	Degrassi: The Next Generation	Shane Kippel, Mike Lobel	September 2, 2025
By Order of the Faithfuls	The Traitors	Tamra Judge, Dolores Catania, Wells Adams	August 11, 2025
Peacemaker: The Official Podcast with James Gunn	Peacemaker	James Gunn, Jennifer Holland, Steve Agee	July 24, 2025
The Bitch Is Back	Buffy the Vampire Slayer; Angel	Charisma Carpenter	June 24, 2025
Northern Disclosure	Northern Exposure	Rob Morrow, Janine Turner	May 20, 2025
RePhrasing: An Archer ReWatch Podcast	Archer	Amber Nash	May 13, 2025
ReLiving Single	Living Single	Erika Alexander, Kim Coles	May 7, 2025
We're Knot Done Yet	Knots Landing	Michele Lee, Donna Mills, Joan Van Ark	April 1, 2025
The Big Bang Theory Podcast	The Big Bang Theory	Jessica Radloff	March 17, 2025
Pod of Rebellion	Star Wars Rebels	Vanessa Marshall, Tiya Sircar, Taylor Gray, Jon Lee Brody	March 11, 2025
How We Made Your Mother	How I Met Your Mother	Josh Radnor, Craig Thomas	March 10, 2025
Still Ugly	Ugly Betty	Michael Urie, Becki Newton	February 19, 2025
Sweep the Pod	Cobra Kai	Dan Ahdoot, Bret Ernst	February 12, 2025
Are You A Charlotte?	Sex and the City	Kristin Davis	January 13, 2025
The Severance Podcast	Severance	Ben Stiller, Adam Scott	January 7, 2025
Spark + Chaos	My Hero Academia	Kyle Phillips, Leah Clark	December 31, 2024
Spare Parts	Letterkenny	Evan Stern, Michelle Mylett	November 12, 2024
Homicide: Life On Repeat	Homicide: Life on the Street	Kyle Secor, Reed Diamond	September 27, 2024
Sidebar: A Suits Watch Podcast	Suits	Patrick J. Adams, Sarah Rafferty	September 24, 2024
Boneheads	Bones	Emily Deschanel, Carla Gallo	September 18, 2024
Middling	The Middle	Eden Sher, Brock Ciarlelli	July 31, 2024
RE-VAMPED (previously known as Slayin' It)	Buffy the Vampire Slayer	Juliet Landau; Christopher Feinstein, Frank Bonacci (episodes 1–7); Rebecca Ralph Farella, Deverill Weekes (episode 8 onwards)	July 30, 2024
Still The Place	Melrose Place	Laura Leighton, Courtney Thorne-Smith, Daphne Zuniga	July 8, 2024
Catching up with the Camdens!	7th Heaven	Beverley Mitchell, David Gallagher, Mackenzie Rosman	July 1, 2024
Off Duty: An NCIS Rewatch	NCIS	Michael Weatherly, Cote de Pablo	June 4, 2024
That Was Us	This Is Us	Mandy Moore, Sterling K. Brown, Chris Sullivan	May 14, 2024
Beyond the OC	The O.C.	Melinda Clarke, CG Mirich	May 2, 2024
Pretty Little Liars: True Crime	Pretty Little Liars	Lindsey Shaw, Tammin Sursok	April 29, 2024
The Lonely Island and Seth Meyers Podcast	Saturday Night Live (SNL Digital Shorts)	Seth Meyers, Andy Samberg, Akiva Schaffer, Jorma Taccone	April 8, 2024
Dear Felicity	Felicity	Amanda Foreman, Greg Grunberg, Juliet Litman	March 13, 2024
Keanan and Lakin Give You Déjà Vu	Step by Step	Staci Keanan, Christine Lakin	February 28, 2024
The History of Curb Your Enthusiasm	Curb Your Enthusiasm	Jeff Garlin, Susie Essman	February 1, 2024
Prison Breaking	Prison Break	Sarah Wayne Callies, Paul Adelstein	January 31, 2024
Magical Rewind	The Wonderful World of Disney; Disney Channel Original Movies	Will Friedle, Sabrina Bryan	January 24, 2024
Little House 50	Little House on the Prairie	Pamela Bob, Alison Arngrim, Dean Butler	January 11, 2024
Con-Versailles-Tions	Versailles	George Blagden, Alexander Vlahos	November 16, 2023
The Trainer's Guide	Pokémon	Veronica Taylor, Rena Taylor	September 20, 2023
Sex, Lies, and Spray Tans	Dancing with the Stars	Cheryl Burke	September 18, 2023
How Rude, Tanneritos!	Full House	Jodie Sweetin, Andrea Barber	July 25, 2023
Full House Rewind	Full House	Dave Coulier; Marla Sokoloff (episode 32 onwards)	July 21, 2023
Just Jack & Will	Will & Grace	Sean Hayes, Eric McCormack	June 22, 2023
My Mrs. Maisel Pod	The Marvelous Mrs. Maisel	Kevin Pollak	June 5, 2023
Living Lizzie - A Very McGuire Podcast	Lizzie McGuire	Jake Thomas, Davida Williams	March 15, 2023
Even More Stevens	Even Stevens	Christy Carlson Romano, Nick Spano, Steven Anthony Lawrence	March 2, 2023
Ned's Declassified Podcast Survival Guide	Ned's Declassified School Survival Guide	Devon Werkheiser, Lindsey Shaw, Daniel Curtis Lee	February 15, 2023
Unpacking The Toolbox	Scandal	Katie Lowes, Guillermo Díaz	February 9, 2023
Wizards of Waverly Pod	Wizards of Waverly Place	Jennifer Stone, David DeLuise	February 6, 2023
Howler Back Now	Teen Wolf	Holland Roden	January 9, 2023
The Lost Girl Rewatch Podcast	Lost Girl	Anna Silk	November 24, 2022
ReWives	The Real Housewives	Bethenny Frankel	November 14, 2022
It's Not Only Football: Friday Night Lights and Beyond	Friday Night Lights	Scott Porter, Zach Gilford, Mae Whitman	November 10, 2022
The Grimmcast	Grimm	Claire Coffee, Bitsie Tulloch, Bree Turner	November 8, 2022
And That's What You REALLY Missed	Glee	Kevin McHale, Jenna Ushkowitz	October 31, 2022
The House of Halliwell	Charmed	Holly Marie Combs, Brian Krause, Drew Fuller; Shannen Doherty (relaunch, episodes 1–2 and 4–7)	September 3, 2022; July 8, 2024 (relaunch)
Girls Next Level	The Girls Next Door	Holly Madison, Bridget Marquardt	August 22, 2022
Back to the Beach	Laguna Beach: The Real Orange County	Kristin Cavallari, Stephen Colletti	July 19, 2022
Talk Ville	Smallville	Tom Welling, Michael Rosenbaum	July 13, 2022
Was it Real? The Hills Rewatch	The Hills	Audrina Patridge, Brody Jenner, Frankie Delgado; Heidi Montag (season 2)	July 12, 2022
Pod Meets World	Boy Meets World; Girl Meets World	Rider Strong, Danielle Fishel, Will Friedle	June 26, 2022
Back to the Barre	Dance Moms	Christi Lukasiak, Kelly Hyland	June 6, 2022
Taskmaster: The People's Podcast	Taskmaster	Jack Bernhardt; Lou Sanders (episodes 1–73); Jenny Eclair (episode 74 onwards)	April 15, 2022
Return to the Shadows	Shadowhunters	Dominic Sherwood, Katherine McNamara	April 11, 2022
The Twilight Effect	The Twilight Saga	Ashley Greene, Melanie Howe	March 15, 2022
Truest Blood	True Blood	Deborah Ann Woll, Kristin Bauer van Straten	February 14, 2022
The Real Brady Bros	The Brady Bunch	Barry Williams, Christopher Knight	February 1, 2022
XOXO	Gossip Girl	Jessica Szohr	January 26, 2022
Supernatural Then and Now	Supernatural	Rob Benedict, Richard Speight Jr.	January 24, 2022
The Mess Around (previously known as Welcome to Our Show)	New Girl	Hannah Simone, Lamorne Morris; Zooey Deschanel (season 1)	January 24, 2022
The Always Sunny Podcast	It's Always Sunny in Philadelphia	Rob McElhenney, Glenn Howerton, Charlie Day	November 18, 2021
The Psychologists Are In	Psych	Maggie Lawson, Timothy Omundson	November 11, 2021
Second in Command: A Veep Rewatch	Veep	Matt Walsh, Timothy Simons	October 12, 2021
Clear Eyes, Full Hearts	Friday Night Lights	Derek Phillips, Stacey Oristano	September 28, 2021
Parks and Recollection	Parks and Recreation	Rob Lowe, Alan Yang (seasons 1–3); Jim O'Heir, Greg Levine (seasons 4–5)	September 14, 2021
Avatar: Braving the Elements	Avatar: The Last Airbender; The Legend of Korra	Janet Varney, Dante Basco	June 22, 2021
Drama Queens	One Tree Hill	Sophia Bush, Bethany Joy Lenz; Hilarie Burton (seasons 1–6); Robert Buckley (seasons 7–9)	June 21, 2021
Questie Besties	Mythic Quest	Charlotte Nicdao, Ashly Burch, Imani Hakim, Jessie Ennis, David Hornsby	June 15, 2021
Return to Beacon Hills	Teen Wolf	Will Wallace, Kate Colvin, Kalissa Mullis	June 5, 2021
I Am All In	Gilmore Girls	Scott Patterson	May 3, 2021
Welcome to the OC, Bitches!	The O.C.	Rachel Bilson, Melinda Clarke	April 27, 2021
Ty & That Guy	The Expanse	Wes Chatham, Ty Franck	February 10, 2021
90210MG	Beverly Hills, 90210	Jennie Garth, Tori Spelling	November 9, 2020
Taskmaster The Podcast	Taskmaster	Ed Gamble	October 15, 2020
Zack to the Future	Saved by the Bell	Mark-Paul Gosselaar, Dashiell Driscoll	July 29, 2020
Victory the Podcast	Entourage	Doug Ellin, Kevin Dillon, Kevin Connolly	June 24, 2020
PANTS	The L Word	Katherine Moennig, Leisha Hailey	June 17, 2020
Pretty Little Wine Moms	Pretty Little Liars	Lesley Fera, Holly Marie Combs, Nia Peeples	May 29, 2020
#ReaperReviews	Sons of Anarchy	Theo Rossi, Kim Coates	May 27, 2020
The Delta Flyers	Star Trek: Voyager; Star Trek: Deep Space Nine	Garrett Wang, Robert Duncan McNeill; Terry Farrell, Armin Shimerman (Star Trek: Deep Space Nine)	May 3, 2020
Talking Sopranos	The Sopranos	Michael Imperioli, Steve Schirripa	April 6, 2020
Fake Doctors, Real Friends	Scrubs	Zach Braff, Donald Faison	March 31, 2020
Gangster Goddess Broad-cast (previously known as Made Women)	The Sopranos	Drea de Matteo, Chris Kushner	March 23, 2020
Showmance: Glee Recap Edition	Glee	Kevin McHale, Jenna Ushkowitz	January 16, 2020
Office Ladies	The Office	Jenna Fischer, Angela Kinsey	October 16, 2019
The 7th Rule	Star Trek: Deep Space Nine; Star Trek: The Next Generation; Star Trek: The Original Series	Cirroc Lofton, Ryan T. Husk; Aron Eisenberg (Star Trek: Deep Space Nine season 1); Denise Crosby (Star Trek: The Next Generation season 1); Walter Koenig (Star Trek: The Original Series seasons 2–3)	January 16, 2019
Battlestar Galacticast	Battlestar Galactica	Tricia Helfer, Marc Bernardin	December 11, 2018
Race Chaser	RuPaul's Drag Race	Alaska Thunderfuck, Willam Belli	July 18, 2018
The Good Place: The Podcast	The Good Place	Marc Evan Jackson	June 1, 2018
The West Wing Weekly	The West Wing	Hrishikesh Hirway, Joshua Malina	March 23, 2016
