= Music podcast =

Genre of media

A music podcast is a genre of podcasts covering topics related to music and musicians, which often includes reviews, interpretations, new releases, musician interviews, music history, music creation, and music theory.

== History ==
Music podcasts date back to the dawn of podcasting when former MTV VJ Adam Curry and tech columnist and former TechTV Host John C. Dvorak coined the term podcast. Among the first music podcasts was AudioFile Airwav, a digital audio counterpart to the TechTV music series AudioFile which featured interviews with popular musicians, digital music trends and music related gear reviews. Created and hosted by Kris Kosach, AudioFile Airwav was initially available only through techtv.com and syndicated on TechTV Radio until it was uploaded by James Kim to the iTunes Music Store in 2005. It remained there until the company was sold to Comcast. Another early music podcast, called Coverville, was started in 2004. Accident Hash and Irish & Celtic Music Podcast and began podcasts the following year.

Positive Feedback Magazine began hosting one of the earliest music podcast in the Fall of 2005. The show, hosted by Austin Jackson, was called the Boston Audio HiFi Industry Podcast. In each episode, Austin Jackson would take user-submitted questions and spend thirty minutes interviewing musicians and other figures in the music industry.

Spotify was one of the earliest platforms to produce music podcasts and has launched the most music podcasts when compared with other platforms. Spotify launched their first Spotify original music podcast, entitled Clarify, in the Fall of 2016. They announced on February 23, 2017, that they would be launching three additional Spotify original music podcasts. The first was entitled Showstopper, which discussed memorable music moments on TV. The next was Unpacked, a podcast focused on interviewing music festival goers across the United States. The third podcast, originally called The Chris Lighty Story but later renamed to Mogul, was about the life and career of the late music executive Chris Lighty. In 2018, Spotify signed exclusive deals with two more music podcasts—The Joe Budden Podcast and Dissect. However, Joe Budden took his podcast off of Spotify two years later when he decided that the company was too difficult to work with and was "pillaging his audience." In 2020, Spotify celebrated Latinx Heritage Month by promoting latinx music and podcasts, which included the music podcasts entitled Sound Stories: Reggaeton, Made in Medellín, and California Love. The platform also hosted the Spotify exclusive music podcast entitled Transmissions: The Definitive Story of Joy Division & New Order and The Ringer Music Show. Spotify launched the platform exclusive country music podcast entitled Country Shine with Graham Bunn. In 2020, The platform released the Spotify exclusive Disney music podcast entitled Soul Stories on Christmas Day. In 2021, the platform partnered with Dreamville to launch the Spotify original music podcast entitled The Messenger. The podcast was based on Bobi Wine's life. Other music podcasts that are Spotify exclusives include Wind of Change and Lost Notes.

Many other music services, radio stations, and news organizations have produced or funded music podcasts, which are sometimes exclusive to their own platforms. For instance, Sony Music released the music podcast My 90s Playlist, Universal Music Group and Wondery launched Jacked: Rise of the New Jack Sound, iHeartRadio released Speed of Sound, and NPR launched Louder Than A Riot. Sony Music, however, has stated that they did not intend to only produce music podcasts. In June 2020, iTunes started hosting the music podcast entitled The Zane Lowe Interview Series hosted by Zane Lowe. The Talkhouse podcast is also on iTunes. One of the top music podcasts on iTunes was Cocaine & Rhinestones in 2018. Google launched its first music podcast, entitled City Soundtracks, around the same time Spotify released Showstopper. Music podcasts have also been produced independently by musicians or music enthusiasts. For example, Sylvan Esso and Pharrell Williams have created their own independent podcasts as well as They Might Be Giants. The IndieFeed Podcast Network, founded in 2004, offered new music from independent artists through single-song episodes across genre-specific channels such as Alternative/Modern Rock, Hip Hop, and Electronica. It was named one of the best podcasts of 2007 and 2008, and Mashable named it one of seven essential podcasts to add to a playlist in 2010.

== Music in podcasts and licensing ==
Creating music for podcast transitions and backgrounds has been a way for music students and obscure bands to showcase their work. For example, Mark Henry Phillips the composer of the music for the podcast Serial. Music podcasts play a role in obscure artists to getting interviews and publicity.

Some music podcasts have been removed from platforms for containing music that wasn't licensed by the podcaster, which has been an issue for transition and background music in the podcasting scene as well.

== Reception ==
According to Marcus J. Moore of the Washington Post, the All Songs Considered and Tiny Desk Concerts podcasts consistently top the iTunes and Stitcher charts with 2.3 million downloads a month as of April 2016.

Forbes mentions Washed Up Emo, Song Exploder, and City Soundtracks as examples of music podcasts and discusses the profitability of podcasts. Music streaming services began expanding into podcasting because music podcasts are complementary to music and draw a wider audience to their platforms.

== Notable examples ==
Emma Carey of Esquire Magazine compiled a list of the best music podcasts for discovering and digesting music. The list included Song Exploder hosted by Hrishikesh Hirway, Dissect hosted by Cole Cuchna, Louder Than a Riot hosted by Rodney Carmichael and Sidney Madden, Switched on Pop hosted by Nate Sloan and Charlie Harding, Questlove Supreme hosted by Ahmir Khalib Thompson, Rolling Stone: Music Now hosted by Rolling Stone Magazine, All Songs Considered hosted by Bob Boilen and Robin Hilton, Talkhouse host by the Talkhouse Media, Lost Notes hosted by KCRW, and No Effects hosted by Jesse Cohen.

Dan Price of Make Use Of Magazine compiled a list of the best 2019 music podcasts that are Spotify originals or hosted exclusively on the Spotify platform. The list included Showstopper hosted by Naomi Zeichner, The Joe Budden Podcast hosted by Joe Budden, Dissect hosted by Cole Cuchna, Microphone Check hosted by Frannie Kelley and Ali Shaheed Muhammad, Fest and Flauschig hosted by Jan Böhmermann and Olli Schulz, MotoGP Podcast hosted by Spotify Studios and Dorna Sports, Are and Be hosted by Spotify Studios, David's out for a Good Time hosted by David Olshanetsky, Under Cover hosted by Spotify Studios, and Amy Schumer Presents: 3 Girls, 1 Keith hosted by Amy Schumer.

John Kennedy of Clash Magazine compiled a list of the best music podcasts to listen to during the COVID-19 pandemic lock down. The list included Tape Notes hosted by John Kennedy, The Adam Buxton Podcast hosted by Adam Buxton, James Acaster's Perfect Sounds hosted by James Acaster, Elevenses hosted by Danielle Perry, Bugeye's Rock Pop Rambles hosted by Angela Martin, and Tales From No Man's Land hosted by Frank Turner.

Bianca Rodriguez of Marie Claire Magazine compiled a list of the best music podcasts. The list included Song Exploder, Broken Record, Desert Island Discs, Hit Parade, Tiny Desk Concerts, Riffs On Riffs, Popcast, Your Favorite Band Sucks, Rolling Stone Music Now, Song vs. Song, and Disgraceland.

Anne Bensfield and Pamela Rogers of the School Library Journal compiled a list of the best music podcasts for starting off the year 2021.

== Adaptions ==
Music podcasts have been adapted into other mediums such as Song Exploder, which was adapted into a Netflix original film.

== Awards ==
Above the Basement won the 2020 Boston Music Awards for best Music Podcast / Radio Show of the Year.

The 2020 iHeartRadio nominees for best music podcast included All Songs Considered by NPR, Bobbycast by iHeartRadio, Broken Record with Malcolm Gladwell, Rick Rubin, and Bruce Headlam by Pushkin Industries, DISGRACELAND by iHeartRadio, expediTIously with Tip 'T.I.' Harris by PodcastOne, Song Exploder by Radiotopia, Sound Opinions by WBEZ Chicago. The winner of the 2020 iHeartRadio award for best music podcast was DISGRACELAND.

The 2021 iHeartRadio nominees for best music podcast include Bobbycast by The Nashville Podcast Network, Broken Record by Pushkin Industries, Disgraceland by Jake Brennan, Dolly Parton's America by WNYC & OSM Audio, and Song Exploder by Hrishikesh Hirway. Dolly Parton's America by WNYC & OSM Audio won the 2021 iHeartRadio award for best Music Podcast.

The People's Choice Podcast Award for Best Music Podcast has been awarded to Coverville, Accident Hash, Catholic Rockers, Irish & Celtic Music Podcast, JuRY, The Modern Vinyl Podcast, and Switched on Pop.

== See also ==
- Music
- Music radio
- Popular music
- List of popular music genres
