= Operation Cutting Edge =

Initiative by the New York City Police Department to reduce knife violence

Operation Cutting Edge was an initiative by the New York City Police (NYPD) to reduce knife related violence. Introduced in 2016 in response to heightened "slashings", the operation had the goal of documenting and tracking the attacks on computers, and sending additional police to areas known for knife deaths.

== Background ==
In the 1990s, the NYPD began classifying gun deaths in a different category, along with using CompStat to track crime datapoints to draw conclusions. Based on this computer system, the NYPD would allocate police to more parts of the city where crime was more common. While it is debated whether the program helped fix the issue of homicide by gun, gun crime in the city fell. However, in 2016, the rate of deaths by knife had risen, and the police force decided they needed to investigate and take action against that type of crime.

== Operation ==
In response to the growing knife death rates, Bill de Blasio NYPD planned to add 2000 police to their force and allocate more police to areas notorious for slashings, such as the subway. Additionally, more officers will be officers will be placed in these areas during the early hours of the morning, when slashings are most common. Along with other violent crime, the NYPD will add slashings to the CompStat system to draw conclusions.
