= John Maple =

John Maple may refer to:

- John Blundell Maple, English business magnate who owned the furniture maker Maple & Co.
- John Maple (furniture maker), founder of the furniture makers and upholsterers Maple & Co.
- Jack Maple (1952–2001), New York City Police Deputy Commissioner

== See also ==
- John Maples (1943–2012), British politician
