= The One AM Radio =

American band

- Origin: New Haven, Connecticut
- Genres: Electronica, ambient, indie
- Years active: 1999–present
- Labels: Dangerbird, Level Plane, Translucence
- Website: theoneamradio.com

The One AM Radio is a band consisting of Hrishikesh Hirway, a composer and songwriter from Los Angeles. The One AM Radio's sound is often characterized by Hirway's lush vocals over dream-like instrumental arrangements. He does most of his own recording, playing several of the instruments and producing all the beats; the style borders electronica, folk, post-rock, chamber music, and ambient music.

Born in Massachusetts, Hirway began The One AM Radio while a student at Yale University, where he studied art and film.

Songs by The One AM Radio have appeared in the television shows Chuck, Gossip Girl, One Tree Hill, in ads for Pontiac and Rdio, and the films Save the Date and The End of Love. The One AM Radio's second album, A Name Writ In Water, was named by Time Out New York as one of the top 10 albums of 2004.

== Discography ==
=== Albums ===
- Heaven Is Attached By A Slender Thread (2011), Dangerbird Records
- This Too Will Pass (2007), Dangerbird Records
- A Name Writ In Water (2004), Level Plane Records
- The Hum of the Electric Air! (2002), CD released by Translucence and Alone Records, LP released by The Electric Human Project

=== Remixes ===
- Now, Now - Thread (The One AM Radio Remix) (2013)
- Sea Wolf - "Old Friend (The One AM Radio Remix featuring Abigail Spencer) (2013)
- Poliça - "Wandering Star" (The One AM Radio Remix) (2012)
- Giraffage feat. XXYYXX - "Even Though (The One AM Radio Remix)" (2012)
- Dntel - "Rock My Boat (The One AM Radio Version)" (2011)
- Baths - "Hall (The One AM Radio Remix feat. The Los Feliz Ladies Choir)" (2010)
- James Figurine - "Apologies (The One AM Radio Remix)" (2009)
- Lymbyc Systym - "Astrology Days (Remix by The One AM Radio)" (2008)
- Silversun Pickups - "Little Lover's So Polite (The One AM Radio Remix)" (2007)

=== Guest appearances ===
- alias - "The Weathering", on Resurgam (2008)
- Caural - "Cold Hands", on Mirrors For Eyes (2006)
- Daedelus - "Thanatopsis", on Exquisite Corpse (2005)

=== EPs ===
- On the Shore of the Wide World (2005), Level Plane
- An Assembly (2003), Translucence
- A Cloud's Fear of Kites : A Kite's Fear of Heights (2000), Garbage Czar

=== 7”s ===
- "Accidents & Good Intentions" (2012)
- Credible Threats (2010)
- I Think This Is My Exit (2002), Troubleman Unlimited

=== Splits ===
- Night Falls split CD/12" with The Wind-Up Bird, CD released 2002 on Alone Records; 12-inch released 2006 on Paramnesia
- split CD with Tracy Shedd (2002), Translucence and Alone Records
- split 7-inch with Jeromes Dream (2001), Garbage Czar
- split 7-inch/CD with Ted Leo and the Pharmacists, 7-inch released 1999 on Garbage Czar Records; CD single released 2003 on Translucence

=== Compilation Appearances ===
- "Old Men" on Give Listen Help, Volume 5 (2008), Urban Outfitters/Filter Magazine
- "You Can Still Run" on 80 Records And We're Still Not Broke (Yet) (2005), Level Plane
- "Shortest Day of the Year" on Tea at the Palaz of Hoon (1998), Cosmodemonic Telegraph

=== Production ===
- Eulogies by Eulogies, co-producer (Dangerbird, 2007)
- Tempted to Do Nothing EP by Eulogies, co-producer (Dangerbird, 2008)
- Here Anonymous by Eulogies, co-producer (Dangerbird, 2009)
