= Centuries of Sound =

Music mix podcast

Presentation
- Hosted by: James Errington
- Genre: History of recorded sound, Music podcast, Sound collage
- Language: English

Production
- No. of episodes: 51

Publication
- Original release: January 1, 2017
- Cited for: Bronze Bullseye Award, British Podcast Awards 2019

Related
- Website: https://centuriesofsound.com/series/centuries-of-sound/

Centuries of Sound is a series of mixes and podcasts presenting a history of recorded sound, produced independently by Cambridge-based sound artist James Errington. Each mix presents sounds recorded in a single year, and episodes are released monthly, in chronological order. Errington also presents a monthly show of the same name on Cambridge 105 Radio in which he discusses the music of a year with a guest. Centuries of Sound has been reviewed by multiple publications and received a British Podcast Award in 2019.

== Background ==
Errington researched and sourced music from a number of sources, including Archive.org, Rate Your Music and Acclaimed Music. The first mixes include early sound recordings made by Édouard-Léon Scott de Martinville in 1860, and the earliest episodes are shorter and cover multiple years, due to a lack of surviving recordings. Each mix contains not just music but layered speech and other sounds. Contemporary "preview" mixes were also posted for the years 2016 to 2019 and there are annual Christmas and Halloween episodes covering particular eras.

== Reception ==
Notable individual episodes include the 1927 mix, reviewed in The New Yorker, the 1901 mix, which was one of Indiewire's 50 best podcast episodes of 2018, the 1931 mix, which was podcast of the week in The Financial Times, the 1943 mix, reviewed by Cory Doctorow, and the 2016 mix, covered in Hyperallergic. Centuries of Sound received a bronze Bullseye Award at the 2019 British Podcast Awards.
