= The West Wing Weekly =

American television podcast

Cast and voices
- Hosted by: Hrishikesh Hirway; Joshua Malina

Publication
- Original release: March 23, 2016 – January 29, 2020
- Provider: Radiotopia

Related
- Website: thewestwingweekly.com

The West Wing Weekly is an American podcast hosted by Hrishikesh Hirway and Joshua Malina. In each episode, the hosts discuss one episode of the television program The West Wing, which originally aired on NBC from 1999 to 2006. The podcast, which ran from 2016–2020, features various cast and crew members including series creator Aaron Sorkin, director Tommy Schlamme, series actors Martin Sheen, Rob Lowe, Bradley Whitford, Richard Schiff, Allison Janney, Janel Moloney, Marlee Matlin, and Dulé Hill, longtime series writer-producers Eli Attie and Lawrence O'Donnell, and many former government officials, academics, and pundits, among others, including several live tapings with an audience.

The New York Times described the podcast as "taking a fine-tooth comb to each episode of [the] political drama".

== History ==
Joshua Malina, who played Will Bailey in The West Wing, said, "I've been a frequent guest on other people's podcasts, and I have always wanted to find something that I could call my own," collaborating with his friend and the host of the podcast Song Exploder, Hrishikesh Hirway, to start the podcast. The first episode was released on March 22, 2016 and new episodes are released weekly on Wednesdays, the night on which The West Wing originally aired. In September 2016, the podcast was added to the Radiotopia network.

== Episodes ==
=== Season 1 ===
The podcast debuted on March 22, 2016 with an episode discussing the pilot episode of The West Wing. The first guest of the podcast was Dulé Hill, who played the role of Charlie Young on the series. Other guests during the season included cast members Janel Moloney, Richard Schiff, Melissa Fitzgerald, William Duffy, Peter James Smith, Liza Weil, Kathleen York, Bill O'Brien, and Tim Matheson, series writer-producer Eli Attie, series costumer Lyn Paolo, and other guests such as Ronald Klain, Senator Bob Casey Jr., former White House spokesperson Jay Carney, Patrick Murphy, and Mayor Karen Freeman-Wilson. The season also included a 10 year reunion episode with The West Wing cast at the ATX Television Festival and a discussion panel with the FiveThirtyEight team.

=== Season 2 ===
The second season episodes began on September 20, 2016 with a discussion with series creator Aaron Sorkin. The second season included Tommy Schlamme, set decorator Ellen Totleben, cast members Bradley Whitford, Emily Procter, Michael O'Neill, Dave Chameides, Kim Webster, Nina Siemaszko, Rob Lowe, Marlee Matlin, Oliver Platt as well as other guests including Eric Fanning, Congressman Brendan Boyle, Congressman Steve Gunderson, former White House Communications Director, Donald A. Baer. The season also featured a Q&A episode with the hosts, called "Big Block of Cheese", named after the eponymous day from the episode "The Crackpots and These Women", and a live episode at SF Sketchfest with Bradley Whitford.

=== Season 3 ===
The third season began on April 5, 2017 with the discussion of 9/11 special episode Isaac and Ishmael, with Ajay Naidu and former White House Press Secretary, Mike McCurry. It included interviews with guest star Mark Harmon, composer W. G. Snuffy Walden, writer Eli Attie, Canadian Prime Minister Justin Trudeau, a previously unaired interview with John Spencer and a live taping for the season finale episode with Aaron Sorkin and Allison Janney.

=== Season 4 ===
The fourth season began on October 4, 2017 with a special episode featuring Martin Sheen. It featured interviews with guest stars John Gallagher Jr., Clark Gregg, and Aimee Mann, director Christopher Misiano, and former Education Secretary John King Jr. The season concluded with a retrospective live episode at The Town Hall in New York City with guests Aaron Sorkin and Emily Procter.

=== Season 5 ===
The fifth season began on May 29, 2018 with a live episode recorded at Georgetown University featuring Bradley Whitford and Ronald Klain. It included interviews with writers Lauren Schmidt Hissrich and Alexa Junge, Lawrence O'Donnell, Debora Cahn, and Josh Singer; guest stars Bellamy Young, Wilson Cruz and Jason Isaacs; and real life political staffer Jennifer Palmieri, and former politicians John Tierney and Tom Daschle.

=== Season 6 ===
The sixth season began on December 4, 2018, with special episodes replacing regular episodes in the last week of each month. Regular episodes featured interviews with cast members Allison Janney, Mary McCormack, Bradley Whitford, Richard Schiff and Alan Alda; guest stars Penn & Teller, Evan Arnold and Karis Campbell; politicians Jacob Walles, Pete Buttigieg and Tony Blinken; and Professor Lawrence Lessig, who was portrayed by Christopher Lloyd on an episode of the TV series. Special episodes included interviews with writer Paul Redford, political consultant David Axelrod, graphic designer Michael Bierut and actor Gary Cole and producer David Mandel from Veep.

=== Season 7 ===
The seventh and final season began on July 9, 2019.

== Reception ==
The New York Times called it "A podcast with a ringer". The Guardian also reviewed it positively calling it, "The new West Wing podcast is a tonic to Trumpmania".

== See also ==
- Political podcast
- The West Wing Thing
