= Kris Kosach =

- Occupations: Television host and radio personality

Kris Kosach is an American television host and radio personality, producer, and writer. She is best known for her work as one of the first VJs on MTV2 and as a Music Host for TechTV. She has also hosted multiple shows for Travel Channel.

== Career ==
Kosach began her career in radio, working at Alternative Rock stations before being recruited as one of the first VJs to launch the all-music network MTV2, then known simply as M2. Kosach hosted daily sample blocks of M2's eclectic playlists on parent network MTV and was the face of Viacom's first Live Stream.

Following MTV, Kosach Hosted the music technology series AudioFile for TechTV. The show was shot on location in music locales around the globe and throughout the United States. AudioFile covered all aspects of music production from artist releases to creation to distribution. The show included a music news segment and was ground-breaking for its coverage of industry issues such as music piracy, and events including the first stream of the Grammy Awards. The series followed the evolution of the music industry through the digital age, earning it an Emmy Award.

With her background in radio, Kosach repurposed AudioFile's A-List artist interviews to create a stand-alone digital audio series, or what would later be described as a podcast. Prior to the iTunes platform, "AudioFile AirWav" was available as a downloadable MP3 on techtv.com. Today, "AudioFile AirWav" is regarded as one of the first music podcasts. Kosach was later named the network's Entertainment Reporter where she covered the NAPSTER scandal, Hollywood CGI effects and an exclusive look at the first streaming broadcast of the Grammys music awards in addition to being a contributor to ABC News and CNN.

In 2004, Kosach hosted the multiple award-winning series Travel Gear for Travel Channel, concurrently, writing the first blog for Discovery. In 2010, she hosted CNN's first podcast. She currently lives with her family in Los Angeles.

== Personal life ==
Kosach is married to television executive Alex Wellen.
