= Here Anonymous =

Studio album by Eulogies
- Released: April 7, 2009
- Recorded: 2008 – Los Angeles
- Genre: Indie rock
- Length: 41:03
- Label: Dangerbird Records
- Producer: Peter Walker; Hrishikesh Hirway

Eulogies chronology
Eulogies (2007)	Here Anonymous (2009)

Professional ratings
Review scores
Source	Rating
Pitchfork Media	(6.3/10)

Here Anonymous is the second studio album of Los Angeles–based indie rock group Eulogies, released by Dangerbird Records on April 7, 2009, on CD as well as 12" vinyl.

The album was co-produced by Peter Walker and Hrishikesh Hirway (The One A.M. Radio), who also worked together on Eulogies' self-titled debut album in 2007. Noted producer Tony Hoffer served as executive producer and mixer of the album. Founding member and bassist Tim Hutton left the band shortly after recording resumed for this album, and he was replaced by Garrett Deloian in January 2009. Guitarist Drew Phillips makes his recording debut with the band on Here Anonymous as well.

Nikki Monniger, bassist and singer for the indie rock band Silversun Pickups provides vocals on the single "Two Can Play"

== Track listing ==
All songs written by Peter Walker.

1. "Day to Day" – 3:24
2. "Eyes on the Prize" – 3:01
3. "Bad Connection" – 3:28
4. "Two Can Play" (featuring Nikki Monninger) – 2:21
5. "How to Be Alone" – 3:35
6. "This Fine Progression" – 4:33
7. "Out of Character" – 3:24
8. "A Dark Place" – 2:10
9. "Goodbye" – 3:06
10. "The Fight (I've Come to Like)" – 3:59
11. "Stranger Calliope" – 3:59
12. "Is There Anyone Here?" – 4:05

== Credits ==
- Peter Walker – vocals, guitar, keyboards
- Tim Hutton – bass, backing vocals
- Chris Reynolds – drums
- Drew Phillips – guitar
- Produced by Peter Walker and Hrishikesh Hirway
- Executive produced and mixed by Tony Hoffer
- Engineered by Ryan Hewitt
- Guest vocals on "Two Can Play" by Nikki Monninger
- Guest flute on "Stranger Calliope" by Laura Darlington
- Guest guitar throughout by Hrishikesh Hirway
- Jeff Castelaz – A&R
- Glenn Davis – legal representation
