= How We Made Your Mother =

American rewatch podcast

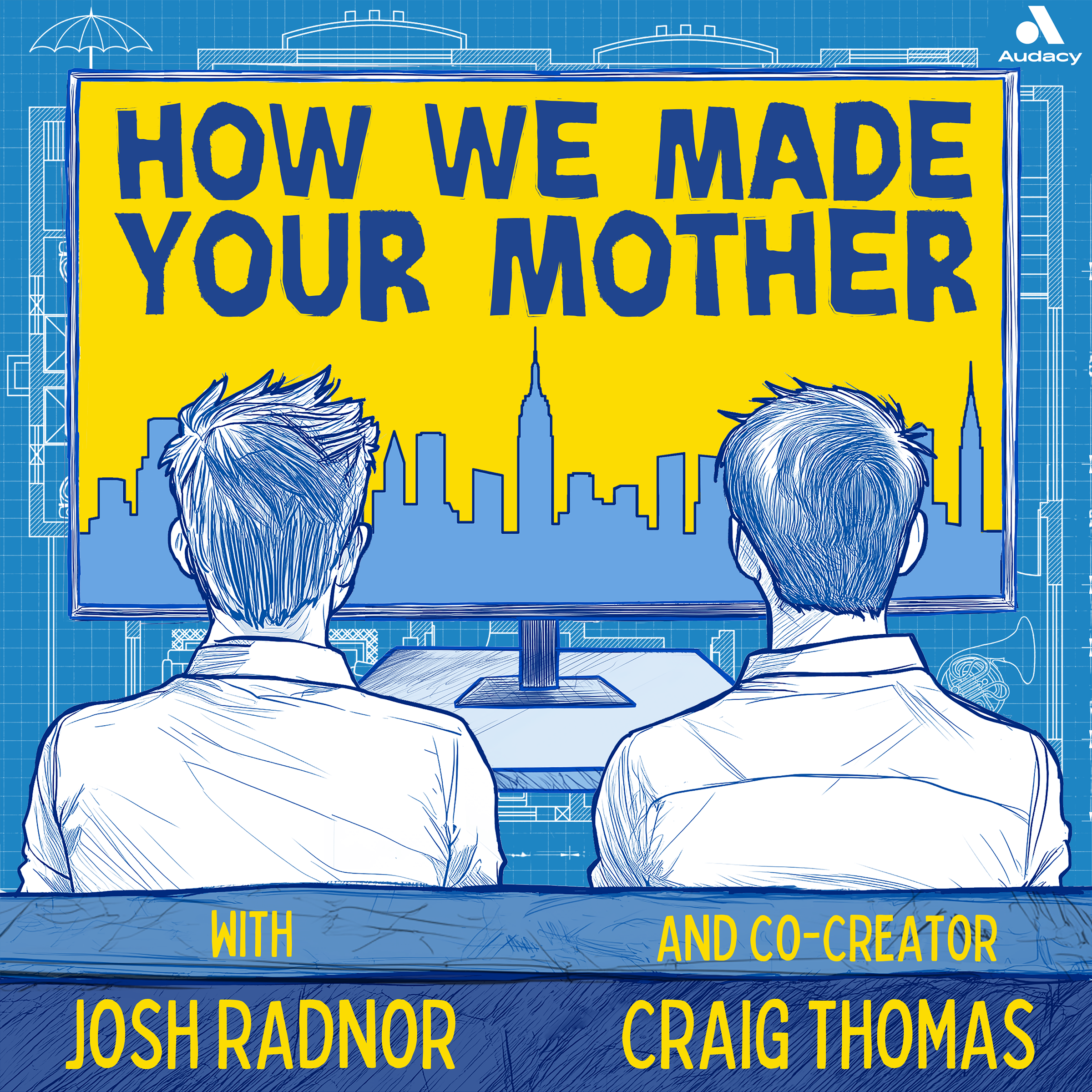
- Genre: Rewatch
- Language: English

Cast and voices
- Hosted by: Josh Radnor; Craig Thomas

Music
- Opening theme: "New York City" by Josh Radnor

Publication
- No. of episodes: 78
- Original release: March 10, 2025
- Provider: Audacy
- Updates: Weekly

Related
- Related shows: How I Met Your Mother
- Website: www.howwemadeyourmother.com

How We Made Your Mother is a rewatch podcast hosted by Josh Radnor and Craig Thomas, the lead actor and co-creator, respectively, of the American television sitcom How I Met Your Mother. The podcast premiered on 10 March 2025, ahead of the series' twentieth anniversary, and is produced by Alek Lev.

The podcast moved to Audacy and joined the Office Ladies Network for its second season in October 2025. A two-part interview with Neil Patrick Harris released in March 2026 generated coverage across major entertainment publications in the United States and abroad.

== Overview ==
Each episode of the podcast revisits an episode of How I Met Your Mother, with Radnor and Thomas providing behind-the-scenes commentary, reflections on the series' development, and responses to listener questions. Episodes also feature interviews with cast members, writers, directors, and producers from the original series. The podcast is structured to follow the sitcom's nine-season, 208-episode run.

== Production ==
The concept for the podcast originated when Radnor's wife, Jordana Jacobs, who had never seen the series, expressed interest in watching it. As Thomas explained to People, "I think Josh was really happy to meet and fall in love with and marry somebody who didn't come in with 208 episodes of 'How I Met Your Mother' memorized." Radnor and Thomas subsequently developed the idea into a rewatch podcast format focused on creative process and long-form storytelling.

Radnor has described the rewatch process as a form of personal reconciliation with the original series after years of distance from the Ted Mosby character. In an interview with the New York Post, Radnor noted that the podcast allowed him to approach the show with greater compassion for both the material and his past performance. Radnor also noted that the timing aligned with the hosts approaching the age of the series' narrator: "There's a lot of stuff baked into the podcast that parallels the ethos of the show, because Craig and I are approaching the age that older Ted was when he told this story to his kids."

In October 2025, the podcast entered a partnership with the audio platform Audacy and joined the Office Ladies Network for its second season. As part of the agreement, Radnor, Thomas, and Office Ladies hosts Jenna Fischer and Angela Kinsey were named executive producers. The podcast is co-produced by Doug Matejka, with Alex Reeves serving as audio engineer.

== Notable episodes ==
=== Neil Patrick Harris two-part interview ===
In March 2026, the podcast released a two-part interview with Neil Patrick Harris, who played Barney Stinson in the original series. The first part aired on 16 March 2026, with the second part following on 23 March 2026. The interview received coverage from numerous entertainment publications.

In the interview, Harris defended the controversial 2014 series finale, stating that Barney's character arc remained consistent with the show's original storytelling logic. Harris also reflected on what he described as a disconnect between himself and Radnor during the original production. According to BuzzFeed, Harris explained that his focus on comedic performance made him indifferent to the show's emotional dimension, and Radnor responded by acknowledging he had sometimes confused the character of Barney with Harris.

In a separate People article, Harris attributed part of the show's longevity to the cast's persistent concern about cancellation. Entertainment Weekly reported on Harris's reflections on the show's enduring appeal. Entertainment Tonight covered the on-set drama revealed in the episodes. Additional coverage appeared in Yahoo Entertainment.

== Reception ==
The podcast has received coverage from entertainment publications in the United States and internationally. Variety described the podcast as a fit within Audacy's entertainment slate when announcing the network partnership. Office Ladies hosts Jenna Fischer and Angela Kinsey praised the podcast in their welcome statement, describing it as "funny, warm, and thoughtful." TVLine identified the podcast as a key venue for Thomas's retrospective reflections during the show's twentieth anniversary in September 2025.

In a profile of Radnor's personal life for Kveller, writer Lior Zaltzman described the podcast as "excellent and quite illuminating." The podcast has also received coverage from international outlets, with Belgian public broadcaster RTBF covering revelations made by guest Cobie Smulders.

Following the Neil Patrick Harris episodes in March 2026, Parade highlighted the podcast's role in revisiting the most debated narrative choices of the original series. BuzzFeed writer Ellen Durney characterized the Harris interview as a candid reframing of the original cast dynamic.

In an interview with People, Radnor described the process of rewatching and discussing the show as "healing," stating that it allowed him to approach the series with greater distance and compassion for both the material and his past performance.

== Episodes ==
How We Made Your Mother releases weekly episodes featuring hosts Josh Radnor and Craig Thomas discussing episodes of How I Met Your Mother, as well as bonus episodes featuring cast, crew, and other guests.
