= Wizards of Waverly Pod =

Rewatch podcast

- Genre: Rewatch
- Language: English

Cast and voices
- Hosted by: Jennifer Stone; David DeLuise

Publication
- No. of episodes: 77
- Original release: February 6, 2023
- Provider: The Podcast Company
- Updates: Weekly on Mondays

Related
- Related shows: Wizards of Waverly Place

Wizards of Waverly Pod is a rewatch podcast of the popular Disney Channel series Wizards of Waverly Place (WOWP), hosted by Jennifer Stone and David DeLuise. Announced in December 2022, the podcast produced by The Podcast Company premiered on February 6, 2023.

== Premise ==
In the podcast, Stone and DeLuise dish on some of the behind-the-scenes details, as well as unscripted moments and the life of the actors from Wizards of Waverly Place, the movie and Alex vs. Alex, and sequel, Wizards Beyond Waverly Place. Interviews with the cast and crew, as well as other Disney Channel alums are featured on the show. Listeners can interact with DeLuise and Stone during their Q&A segments, and questions can be submitted through the podcast's Instagram stories. WOWP's lead cast member, Selena Gomez, was featured as a guest in the first episode, and in subsequent episodes.
