= Eulogia =

Ecclesiastical term

The term eulogia (Ancient Greek: εὐλογία, eulogía), Greek for "a blessing", has been applied in ecclesiastical usage to "a blessed object". It was occasionally used in early times to signify the Holy Eucharist, and in this sense is especially frequent in the writings of St. Cyril of Alexandria. The origin of this use is doubtless to be found in the words of St. Paul (1 Corinthians 10:16); to poterion tes eulogias ho eulogoumen. But the more general use is for such objects as bread, wine etc., which it was customary to distribute after the celebration of the Divine Mysteries. Bread so blessed, we learn from St. Augustine (De pecat. merit., ii, 26), was customarily distributed in his time to catechumens, and he even gives it the name of sacramentum, as having received the formal blessing of the Church: "Quod acceperunt catechumeni, quamvis non sit corpus Christi, sanctum tamen est, et sanctius quam cibi quibus alimur, quoniam sacramentum est" (What the catechumens receive, though it is not the Body of Christ, is holy — holier, indeed, than our ordinary food, since it is a sacramentum). For the extension of this custom in later ages, see Antidoron; Sacramental bread.

The word eulogia has a special use in connection with monastic life. In the Benedictine Rule monks are forbidden to receive "litteras, eulogias, vel quaelibet munuscula" without the abbot's leave. Here the word may be used in the sense of blessed bread only, but it seems to have a wider signification, and to designate any kind of present. There was a custom in monasteries of distributing in the refectories, after Mass, the eulogize of bread blessed at the Mass.

== Sources ==
- Herbermann, Charles, ed. (1913). "Eulogia". Catholic Encyclopedia. New York: Robert Appleton Company.

== See also ==
- Eulogy (disambiguation)
