= Switched on Pop =

Podcast by Nate Sloan and Charlie Harding

Switched On Pop
- Genre: Music podcast
- Language: English

Cast and voices
- Hosted by: Nate Sloan, Charlie Harding

Production
- Production: New York Magazine, Vox Media

Publication
- No. of episodes: 453 (As of 8 January 2026)
- Original release: Oct 2014
- Updates: Weekly

Related
- Website: switchedonpop.com

Switched on Pop is a podcast about popular music. The show was created in 2014. It is hosted by musicologist Nate Sloan and songwriter Charlie Harding.

== Reception ==
The show has received generally very positive reviews, with acclaim from many leading media outlets. In a review for The New Yorker, music critic Alex Ross praised Switched On Pop saying “the show’s hosts deliver charmingly rigorous dissections of Taylor Swift and Weeknd songs, slipping in a fair amount of music history and theory." Rolling Stone said "music theory class was never this fun or addictive." The show was named one of The Atlantic's Top 50 podcasts of 2019, one of the Guardian's best music podcasts in 2021 for its "forensic music analysis," one of Time Out's best podcasts of 2022, one of Vogue's top podcasts of 2023, and one of Esquire's best podcasts in 2024.

== Background ==
Nate Sloan is a musicology professor at the Thornton School of Music of the University of Southern California. Charlie Harding is a songwriter, adjunct professor at New York University, and an Associate Professor at Berklee College of Music. Harding and Sloan started their podcast in October 2014. In the podcast, which is produced in partnership with New York magazine, the duo discuss and analyze the musical concepts behind popular music.

=== Awards ===
Award	Year	Category	Result	Ref.
Signal Awards	2025	Best Music Podcast (Gold)	Won	
Signal Awards	2025	Best Original Score (Bronze)	Won	
Signal Awards	2023	Best Music Podcast	Won	
PROSE Awards	2021	Music & The Performing Arts	Won	
Webby Awards	2020	People's Voice Award for Best Arts & Culture Podcast	Won	
People's Choice Podcast Awards	2019	Best Music Podcast	Won	

Switched on Pop: How Popular Music Works, and Why it Matters
- Author: Charlie Harding; Nate Sloan
- Subject: Pop music
- Publisher: Oxford University Press
- Publication date: 2019
- Pages: 224
- ISBN: 978-0-190-05665-0
- LC Class: ML3470 .S6 2020

== Book adaptation ==
Switched on Pop: How Popular Music Works, and Why it Matters is a 2019 nonfiction book written by Charlie Harding and Nate Sloan with illustrations provided by Iris Gottlieb. The book covers pop music from a musicological perspective. The book is a literary component to the podcast Switched on Pop which is co-hosted by Harding and Sloan and similarly analyzes pop music in a more academic style. The title of both the book and podcast is a play on the debut album by the American composer Wendy Carlos Switched-On Bach. In an interview with The Wall Street Journal, Harding and Sloan revealed they decided to write the book because "the book allows us to think about the things we’ve learned and put them in historical context" and because listeners wanted a "comprehensive guide to how to listen more thoughtfully."

== Chapters ==
The book contains 16 chapters. Each chapter focuses on a pop song from the previous twenty years and uses it to explain a specific musical concept. For example, "Oops!... I Did It Again" by Britney Spears is used to explain counterpoint and "Paper Planes" by M.I.A. is used to highlight the historical and legal aspects of sampling. "Call Me Maybe" by Carly Rae Jepsen and "Get Enough" by Paul McCartney are also analyzed in the introduction and conclusion, respectively, without an associated musical concept.

Songs featured in Switched on Pop
Musical concept	Song title	Artist
Meter	"Hey Ya!"	Outkast
Melody	"You Belong with Me"	Taylor Swift
Harmony	"We Are Young"	Fun.
Form	"We Found Love"	Rihanna
Timbre	"Chandelier"	Sia
Lyric	"What Goes Around... Comes Around"	Justin Timberlake
Hook	"Break Free"	Ariana Grande
Rhyme	"God's Plan"	Drake
Syncopation	"Swimming Pools (Drank)"	Kendrick Lamar
Modulation	"Love On Top"	Beyoncé
Counterpoint	"Oops!... I Did It Again"	Britney Spears
Sampling	"Paper Planes"	M.I.A.
Sound design	"Scary Monsters and Nice Sprites"	Skrillex
Tonal ambiguity	"Despacito"	Luis Fonsi
Genre	"Since U Been Gone"	Kelly Clarkson
Musical identity	"Made in America"	Jay-Z and Kanye West

== Book reception ==
Switched on Pop received positive reviews from critics. Hannah Giorgis of The Atlantic praised the book, writing "Switched on Pop is a far less foreboding sensory experience than 'Swimming Pools,' but it’s no less immersive." Emily Bootle of the New Statesman noted that the "required understanding of music theory leads to necessarily laborious explanations, but also allows for the authors' most illuminating insights". Neil Shah of The Wall Street Journal lauded the book for its "sophisticated but accessible discussion" of the selected musical tracks. The book won the 2021 PROSE Award Subject Category Winner for Music & the Performing Arts.

== See also ==
- Music podcast
