= Acclaimed Music =

Swedish music aggregation website

- Website type: Review aggregator and database
- Available in: English
- Owner: Henrik Franzon
- Creator: Henrik Franzon
- Website: acclaimedmusic.net
- Commercial: No
- Registration: Forum only, optional and free
- Launched: September 2001; 25 years ago
- Current status: Active

Acclaimed Music is a website created by Henrik Franzon, a statistician from Stockholm, Sweden, in September 2001. Franzon has statistically aggregated hundreds of published lists that rank songs and albums into aggregated rankings by year, decade and all-time. Lists that are submitted by readers to magazines or websites are excluded from the aggregation. Author Michaelangelo Matos writes that "Franzon's methods are imperfect, but as indicators of overall critical appeal go, it's hard to beat."

The site's aggregated lists name the Beach Boys' Pet Sounds (1966) as the most highly rated album of all time, and Bob Dylan's "Like a Rolling Stone" (1965) as the most highly rated song of all time. Additionally, the Beatles are the most acclaimed band, Dylan is the most acclaimed male solo artist, and Madonna is the most acclaimed female artist.

On July 8, 2025, Franzon announced that the site will no longer be updated due to an ongoing health issue which has prompted him to stop updating the site due to stress.
