= Pittsburgh toilet =

Toilet common in older American houses

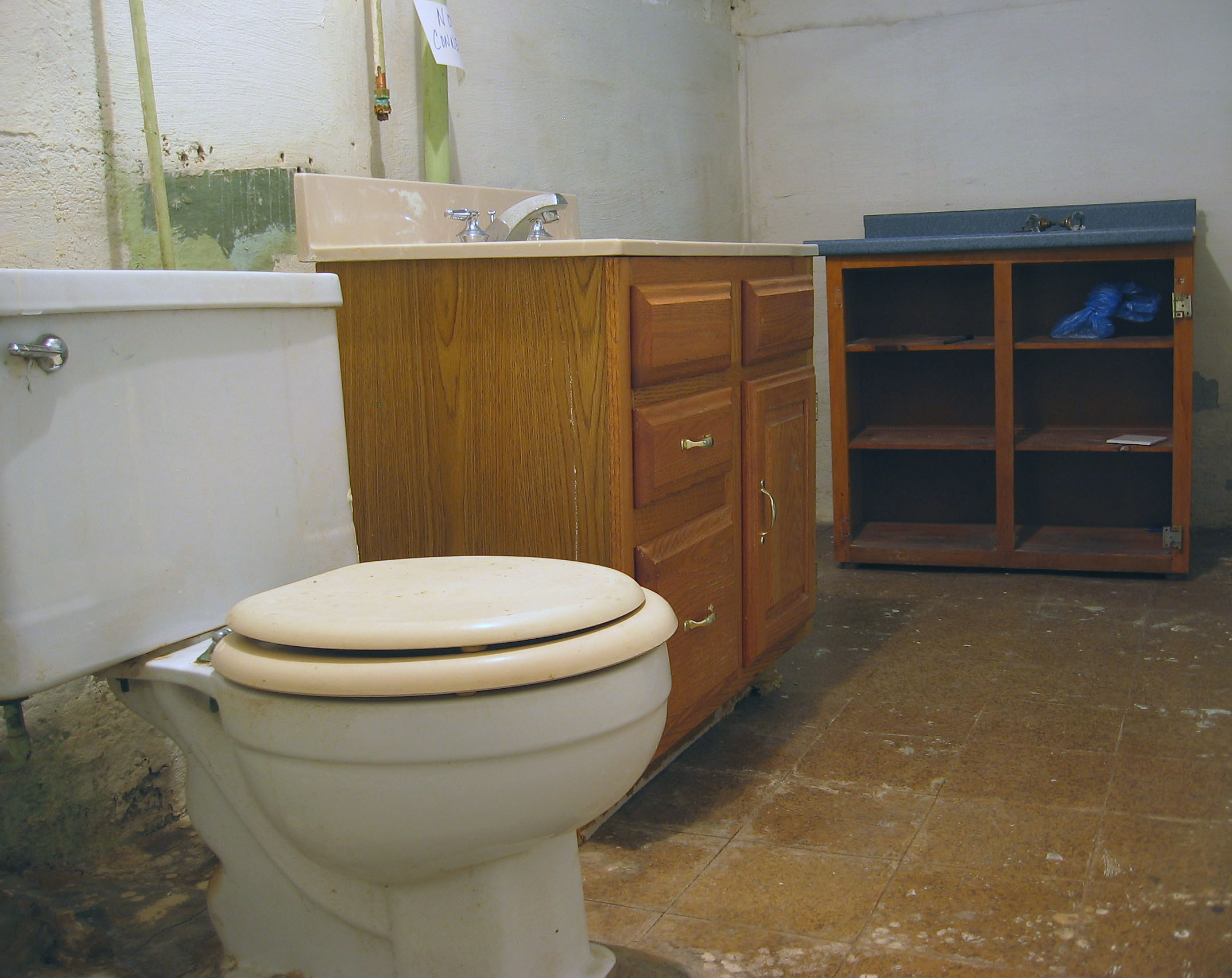
A Pittsburgh toilet

A Pittsburgh toilet, or Pittsburgh potty, is a basement toilet found in some single-family houses in Pittsburgh and other parts of the United States. It consists of an ordinary flush toilet with no surrounding walls. This toilet is often next to other bathroom and laundry room plumbing fixtures, such as a crude shower, a large sink, and a washing machine.

== Origin ==
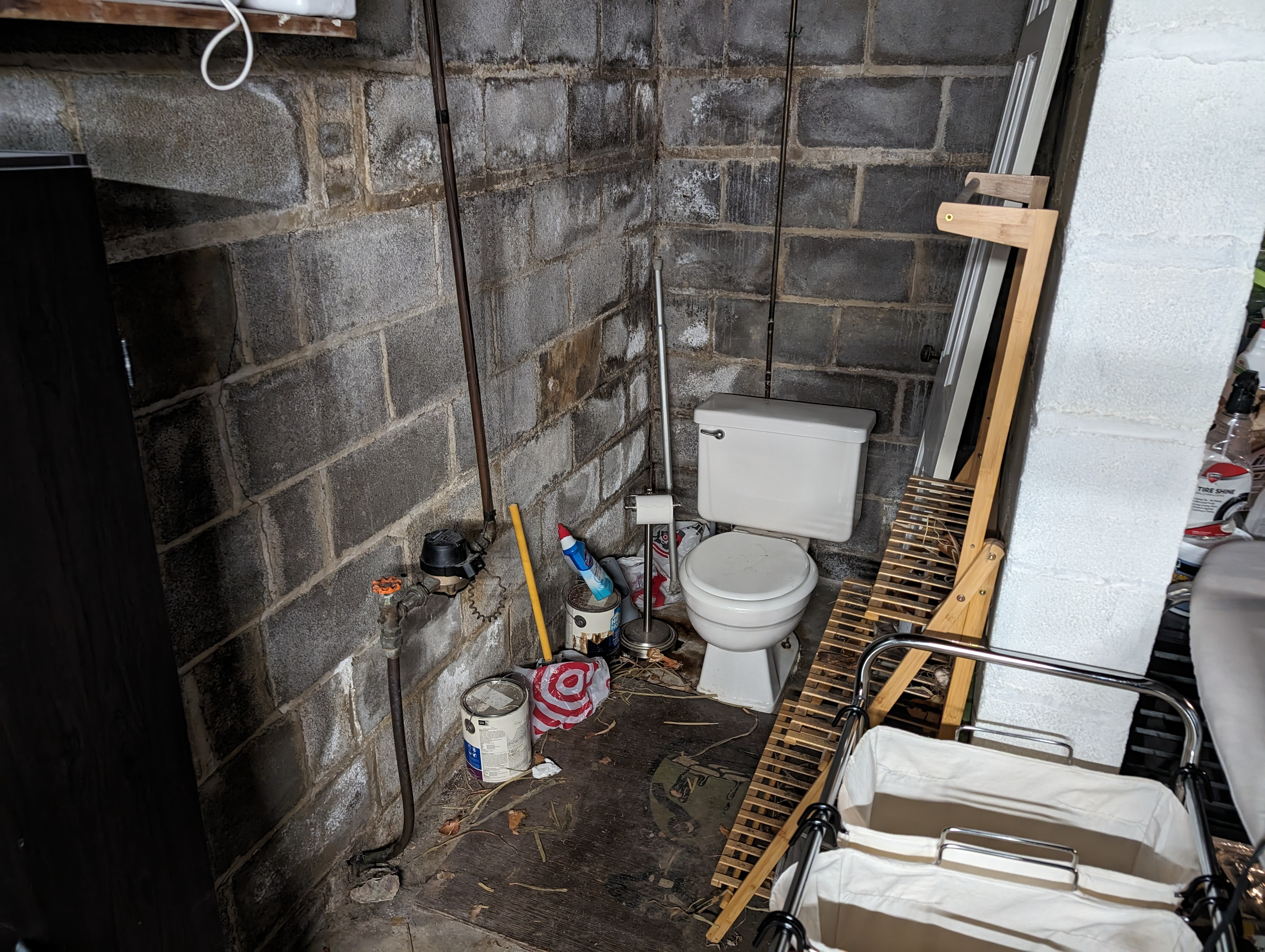
A Pittsburgh-style toilet in the basement of a home in Cleveland, Ohio

The most popular explanation for the Pittsburgh toilet is related to Pittsburgh's status as a major industrial city in the 20th century. According to this explanation, toilets such as these were said to be used by steelworkers and miners who, grimy from the day's labor, could use an exterior door to enter the basement directly from outside and use the basement's shower and toilet before heading upstairs.

Alternatively, they may have served to prevent sewage backups from flooding the living areas of homes. As sewage backups tend to flood the lowest fixture in a residence, a Pittsburgh toilet would be the fixture to overflow, containing the sewage leak in the basement.

In older houses, these toilets may have been the first indoor toilet installed in the house, as a relatively inexpensive installation option that also had less risk of damaging the house if they flooded.

== Distribution ==
In Pittsburgh, these basement toilets are most commonly found in houses built between about 1880 and 1910, along with some built in the 1920s and 1930s. This toilet arrangement is also found in older houses in cities around the country, such as in the midwest, including Cleveland and Milwaukee, parts of the northeast including New Jersey and New York, and in Oregon.
