= Ashley Feinberg =

American journalist

- Born: Dallas, Texas, U.S.
- Education: Trinity University
- Occupation: Journalist
- Writing career
- Period: 2011–present
- Subjects: American politics; social media
- Notable awards: Forbes 30 Under 30
- Website: ashleyfeinberg.com

Ashley Feinberg is an American journalist, covering politics, media, and technology. She is known for her internet sleuthing, through which she has uncovered information about the online activity of public figures.

== Education ==
Feinberg was born in Dallas. She attended Trinity University and studied English and Communication, graduating in 2012.

== Career ==
Feinberg began her journalism career in 2011 as an intern at the San Antonio Current. She joined Gizmodo in 2013 as an Editorial Assistant.

Feinberg drew attention with how-to story about the "creepiest things you can do on Facebook, such as tagging yourself in someone else’s engagement photo and requesting a relationship status." She later was promoted as a staff writer at Gawker. Discussing Gawker's closing in 2016, HuffPost cited Feinberg's work for the site among the reasons that "[i]f you care about free speech, then you should care about Gawker."

In August 2015, Feinberg broke news of 19 Kids and Counting participant and conservative Christian activist Josh Duggar's use of Ashley Madison, an online dating service marketed to married people seeking extramarital affairs. Duggar's paid account was exposed in a July 2015 hacking of the site.

In March 2017, she discovered FBI director James Comey's secret Twitter and Instagram accounts, which he confirmed later that year. Comey had previously mentioned a secret account in an interview and Feinberg connected the pseudonym "Reinhold Niebuhr", who was the subject of Comey's college thesis.

In October 2017, Feinberg joined HuffPost. In November 2017, according to Fox News, Feinberg tweeted, "Congratulations to John McCain's wife and children on their upcoming tax-free inheritance", alluding to McCain's treatment for brain cancer. She subsequently received significant criticism, and later deleted the tweet and apologized. She later joined Slate, in May 2019.

Writing in the Columbia Journalism Review, Matthew Kassel said, "Feinberg's highly ironized persona gives her the air of a digital-era Andy Kaufman." Feinberg's Gawker colleague John Cook described her as "sort of an anti-troll ... She uses the weapons of the troll for the forces of good."

Her interview with Twitter CEO Jack Dorsey was reported internationally, with Dorsey and commentators saying that it made Dorsey "look bad".

Feinberg was chosen for the 2019 Forbes 30 Under 30 in Media list, which noted she is "known for uncovering secrets about public figures through digital sleuthing, having discovered Donald Trump Jr.’s hundreds of posts on an online hunting forum, Sebastian Gorka’s Amazon wishlist and James Comey’s once-private Twitter account" as well as Duggar's Ashley Madison account.

In March 2019, Feinberg reported in HuffPost that American news website Axios had paid a firm to improve its reputation by lobbying for changes to the Wikipedia articles on Axios and Jonathan Swan.

In August 2019, Feinberg and her former employer, HuffPost, were sued for defamation by Professor Derrick Evans for a 2018 article alleging he and Douglas Kennedy had supplied cocaine to fellow students at Georgetown Preparatory School during Brett Kavanaugh's time there, while also insinuating a connection to the drug overdose death of Kennedy's brother.

In October 2019, Feinberg uncovered an anonymous Twitter account that Republican senator Mitt Romney had used to, among other political comments, post criticism of Donald Trump.

In December 2019, Feinberg investigated editors on the English Wikipedia who made edits that appeared to have been written either by Pete Buttigieg or by an individual with intimate knowledge of his early life, family, education, friends, and career. The Buttigieg campaign responded by claiming that these editors were not Buttigieg.
