= This Website Will Self-destruct =

Experimental website

This Website Will Self-Destruct was a website created by comic artist FemmeAndroid (Note: pseudonym) in April 2020. Created in the midst of the COVID-19 pandemic in 2020 for the Ludum Dare game jam, it was a high concept website with the premise that it would self-destruct if nobody posted on it in a 24-hour period. The website allowed visitors to anonymously submit messages, and view other's messages at random. FemmeAndroid announced it had shut down itself in December 2023.

== Overview ==
The website displayed a welcome message, along with a button labelled 'Read a message' which, when clicked, displayed random messages by other visitors. Below that was a form for visitors to write and submit messages anonymously. Upon reading a message, the reader could "heart" it. This action had no effect on the site or the message, but was recorded on the backend per the developer.

There was also a timer counting down from 86,400 seconds on the top, which reset every time a message was posted by anyone.

The welcome message read as follows:

Hi,

I’m a website. I’ll be gone soon, and that’s okay. You can send me messages using the form below. If I go 24 hours without receiving a message, I’ll permanently self-destruct, and everything will be wiped from my database. That’s okay though. Until then, let me know how you’re doing. Other people will be able to read what you write, but your name or identity won’t be attached to anything, so feel free to say what’s on your mind. It’s been a rough month.

With love,

ThisWebsiteWillSelfdestruct (dot) com

PS. I don’t collect any data about you other than the text you send me. I don’t believe in tracking people, so no analytics are kept about users. Consider this my privacy policy and terms of service.

== History ==
A comic artist going by the name FemmeAndroid coded the website for the 46th edition of Ludum Dare - a game jam competition - held in April 2020. According to a post she made on her Patreon page, she had made it in 6 hours as a submission under the theme 'Keep It Alive'. She had initially doubted if it would survive until the judging period. But it did, and blew up in popularity after being posted on the Reddit community r/InternetIsBeautiful.

Upon seeing an influx of sad or suicidal messages, a 'Feeling down?' button which linked to mental health helplines was added.

After the website became popular, targeted transphobic abuse towards FemmeAndroid, who is a trans woman, was posted on the website. A bomb threat towards Charlottesville Fashion Square was also posted.

FemmeAndroid announced it had shut down on her Twitter page in December 2023, after it failed to receive any non-spam messages in a 24-hour period.

== Reception ==
According to the developer, the site received over 15,000 letters that were read over a combined million times in its first weekend. By 31 May 2020, it had received over 115,000 messages that had been read over a combined 15 million times. It went on to receive over 200,000 messages in its first year.

Mark Wikson of Fast Company praised it for its simplicity:

No, This Website Will Self-Destruct is just a website. It’s a place to jot down some thoughts, have a two-second laugh or cry, and kill some time until nobody cares about it anymore. And that moment that its purpose has been served, don’t worry—it’s happy to see itself out.

The website's anachronistic nature was noted by several commentators. Brittany Roston of SlashGear called it a time capsule. Adi Robertson of The Verge also suggested it should be kept as a time capsule, pointing out the unique context of the site amidst the pandemic: "...But the site feels impossible to really understand without the context of the pandemic without instinctively understanding how many posts are about a single event that’s consumed much of the world..."
