= Save the Date (film) =

- Poster
- Directed by: Michael Mohan
- Written by: Jeffrey Brown; Egan Reich; Michael Mohan
- Produced by: Jordan Horowitz; Michael Huffington
- Starring: Lizzy Caplan; Alison Brie; Martin Starr; Geoffrey Arend; Mark Webber
- Cinematography: Elisha Christian
- Edited by: Christian Masini
- Music by: Hrishikesh Hirway
- Production companies: Gilbert Films; XYZ Films
- Distributed by: IFC Films
- Release dates: January 22, 2012 (Sundance Film Festival); November 8, 2012
- Running time: 98 minutes
- Country: United States
- Language: English
- Box office: $5,719

Save the Date is a 2012 American romantic comedy-drama film directed by Michael Mohan. It stars Lizzy Caplan and Alison Brie. It won the Achievement Award at the 2012 Newport Beach Film Festival and was nominated for the Grand Jury Prize at the 2012 Sundance Film Festival.

== Plot ==
Sisters Sarah and Beth are in relationships with bandmates Andrew and Kevin. Beth is making plans for her wedding with Andrew. Sarah, an artist, moves in with Kevin but struggles to overcome her ambivalence.

At a performance by Kevin, Sarah is approached by Jonathan, who has a crush on her and has been hanging around the bookstore she manages. He decides to approach her but starts to withdraw when he overhears she's living with Kevin. Sarah calls him over when she spots him, but Beth's approach abruptly cuts them off.

Kevin, with a rush of adrenalin after a successful set and ignoring warnings from Andrew, proposes to Sarah from the stage. Overwhelmed, she runs out of the venue, moves out and gets her own apartment. She talks to Jonathan at the bookstore and a new relationship blossoms.

Out with Beth and friends, Sarah gets wasted so one of their friends drives her home. Unfortunately, she takes her to Kevin's, not knowing Sarah had moved. She goes in anyway, as the band is meant to be out of town. Kevin is there, as they had to cancel the tour since he is grieving. He makes a pass, but she gives him closure.

Beth, in the meantime, has become obsessive about her upcoming wedding plans, causing friction with Andrew and Sarah. Sarah feels isolated when she discovers she's pregnant, taking a test while away with Beth and their family. She then pulls away from Jonathan without explanation.

When Sarah eventually tells Beth, and she takes it as an attempt to ruin her wedding plans, as the February wedding date would be near the due date. So at Sarah's first solo show of her work, Andrew, Kevin, and Jonathan all attend, but Beth doesn't. The opening at the gallery acts as a catalyst, and all things come to a head.

Andrew gets angry at Beth for not showing up at the gallery. He wakes to find a note from Beth who is waiting for him at the synagogue. Meanwhile, Kevin shows up at Sarah's apartment and wants to date her again. Sarah rejects him, saying that she is pregnant and the child is not his. The next day Kevin beats up Jonathan at his aquarium, but later apologizes and tells him everything.

Beth and Andrew postpone their wedding. Sarah visits a clinic to get an abortion, but Beth meets her before it happens and she changes her mind. When Sarah reaches home she finds Jonathan with her cat who was missing. Kissing him, the movie ends with Sarah saying "Jonathan...".

== Cast ==
- Lizzy Caplan as Sarah
- Alison Brie as Beth
- Martin Starr as Andrew
- Geoffrey Arend as Kevin
- Mark Webber as Jonathan
- Melonie Diaz as Isabelle
- Timothy Busfield as Benjie
- Gigi Bermingham as Mom
- Grant Harvey as Trevor
- Devin Barry as Soul Patch
- Jacob Womack as Jonathan's Friend
- Ray Conchado as Steppenwolf

== Production ==
The film was co-written by cartoonist Jeffrey Brown who also provided the illustrations for the film. Brown and co-writer Egan Reich workshopped the story, and writer-director Michael Mohan finalized the script.

== Release ==
The film was released for a limited one week run in two theatres grossing $5,719

== Reception ==
On Rotten Tomatoes the film has an approval rating of 47% based on reviews from 30 critics. On Metacritic the film has a score of 54 out of 100 based on reviews from 17 critics.
