= Eulogies (Eulogies album) =

Studio album by Eulogies
- Released: September 11, 2007
- Studio: Sunset Sound, Hollywood
- Genre: Indie rock
- Length: 39:13
- Label: Dangerbird Records
- Producer: Peter Walker; Hrishikesh Hirway

Eulogies chronology
Eulogies (2007)	Here Anonymous (2009)

Professional ratings
Review scores
Source	Rating
Pitchfork	6.3/10
The Red Alert	positive
The Music Box	3/5 stars

Eulogies is the debut album of American indie rock group Eulogies, released by Dangerbird Records on September 11, 2007. The album was co-produced by Peter Walker and Hrishikesh Hirway (The One A.M. Radio). A music video was produced for the song "One Man."

A picture disc 7" single was released for "If I Knew You" (with the B-side "Fires Out") in limited quantities. A split single was released on 7" vinyl in 2007, featuring "If I Knew You" by Eulogies on one side, and "You're a Wolf" by Sea Wolf on the other.

== Track listing ==
All tracks written by Peter Walker.

1. "Inward" – 0:25
2. "One Man" – 2:58
3. "Life Boat (Suicide)" – 2:06
4. "If I Knew You" – 4:30
5. "Under the Knife" – 2:48
6. "Can't Relate" – 4:09
7. "Compromise" – 2:38
8. "Running in the Rain" – 2:38
9. "Useless Amends" – 3:57
10. "Little Davie" – 3:39
11. "Can't Relate" (Reprise) – 2:11
12. "Big Eyes" – 4:07
13. "Blizzard Ape" – 3:07

== Personnel ==
- Peter Walker – vocals, guitar, keyboards
- Tim Hutton – bass, backing vocals
- Chris Reynolds – drums
- Produced by Peter Walker and Hrishikesh Hirway
- Recorded by Mike Cresswell at Sunset Sound, Hollywood, California
- Mixed by John Goodmanson at Robert Lang Studios, Seattle, Washington
- "Can't Relate" mixed by Mike Cresswell at Sunset Sound
- Mastered by Dave Cooley at Elysian Masters, Echo Park, California
- Hrishikesh Hirway – guitar on "Little Davie" and "Blizzard Ape"
- Badgie Miller – French horn on "Can't Relate"
- Engineering assistance by Clifton Allen, Graham Hope, John Ziemski, Jason Mott and Bill Mims
- Jeff Castelaz – A&R
- Aaron Burtch – art
- Art and design by Sara Cumings
