= David Olshanetsky =

British-Israeli Tumblr blogger and entrepreneur (born 1997)

- דוד אולשניצקי
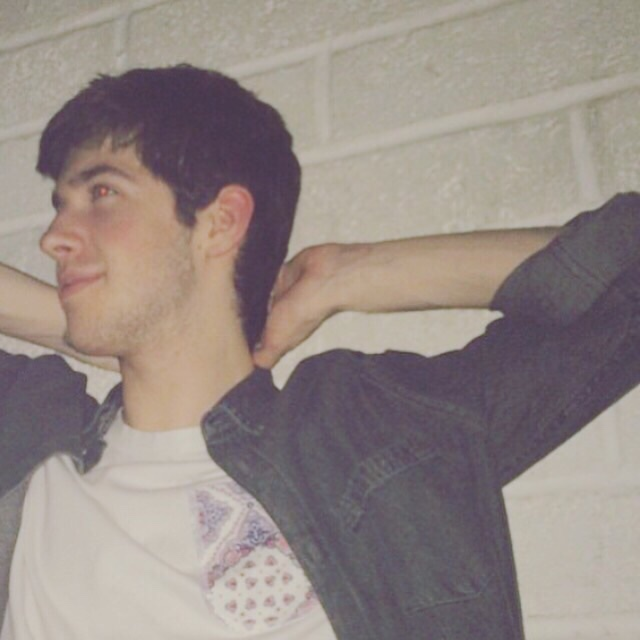
- Olshanetsky in 2015
- Born: 1997 (age 28–29)
- Other name: TheShitneySpears on Tumblr
- Occupations: Blogger; entrepreneur
- Years active: 2013–present

David Olshanetsky (Hebrew: דוד אולשניצקי; born 1997) is a British-Israeli Tumblr blogger and entrepreneur. He is also known and posts under TheShitneySpears, the name of his Tumblr blog.

== Personal life ==
Olshanetsky was born in Israel in 1997. His family travelled to Russia and the United States, before finally settling in Surrey, United Kingdom. He began blogging on Tumblr at the age of 14.

He is studying English & Media BA at Goldsmiths, University of London.

Olshanetsky came out as bisexual to his followers on 20 September 2016.

== Career ==
David Olshanetsky's popularity increased after followers became interested in his diary style entries about his relationships in 2013. On 16 September 2015, he released a collaborative post with Charli XCX sponsored by Red Bull. In 2016 he was shown by Tumblr as the most popular male account in Europe, and fifth most popular account globally.

In the summer of 2017, Olshanetsky worked with Festival Republic and Live Nation to lower homophobia and hate crime rates at the most popular British music festivals. He reported on behalf of Tumblr at V Festival the same year. In 2018 he co-presented an episode of The Calum McSwiggan Show on Fubar Radio,

In 2018 he launched the Spotify podcast David's out for a good time covering LGBTQ and pop culture topics.
