= Hrishikesh Hirway =

American musician, podcaster, and TV host

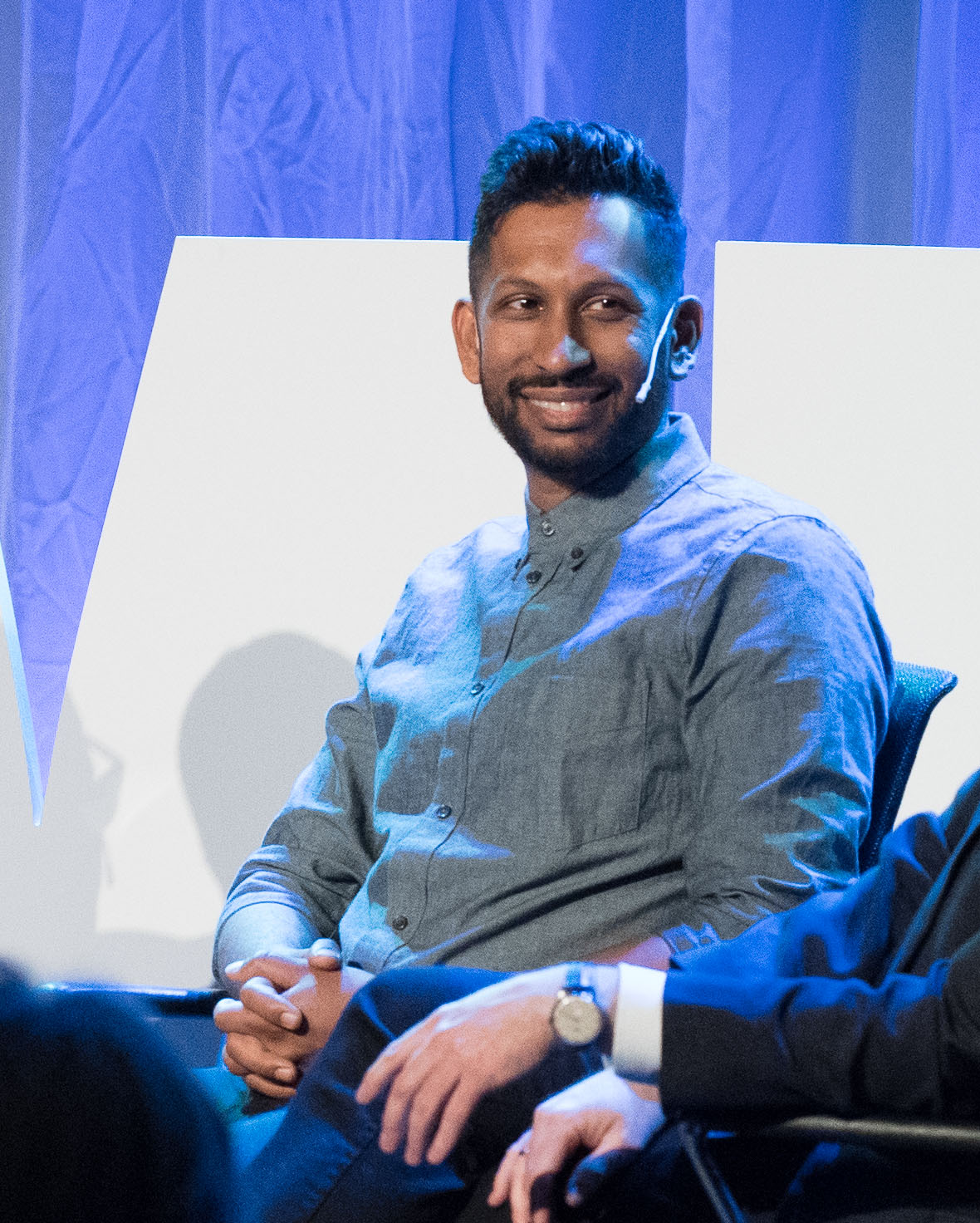
- Hirway in 2018

Background information
- Born: February 1, 1979 (age 47); Peabody, Massachusetts, U.S.
- Occupations: Musician, producer, podcaster
- Years active: 1999–present
- Website: hrishikesh.co

Hrishikesh Hirway (born February 1, 1979) is an American musician, producer, and podcast and television host. He has made four albums under the name The One AM Radio, and has a side project with LaKeith Stanfield called Moors. He is the creator and host of the podcasts Song Exploder, The West Wing Weekly (with co-host Joshua Malina), Home Cooking (with co-host Samin Nosrat), and Partners. He is the executive producer and host of the Netflix television adaptation of Song Exploder. As a composer, Hirway scored the Netflix television show Everything Sucks! and the films Our Nixon, Save the Date, and Companion.

== Early life ==
Hirway was born in Peabody, Massachusetts. He attended Phillips Exeter Academy for high school and then Yale University, where he majored in art.

== Career ==
=== Music ===
Hirway began making music under the name The One AM Radio in 1999. His first release was a split 7” with Ted Leo, recorded by Ted Leo after the two met at a show. There are four One AM Radio albums, released between 2002 and 2011.

Moors is a project with rapper and actor LaKeith Stanfield that began in 2013. Hirway writes and produces the music, and Stanfield writes the lyrics. The duo released an EP in 2014 on Haven Records.

Hirway has made remixes as The One AM Radio, as Moors and as Hrishikesh Hirway.

He co-produced two albums for the band Eulogies.

In August 2021, Hirway played a new song, "Between There and Here (feat. Yo-Yo Ma)" during his TED talk titled What you discover when you really listen.

=== Podcasts ===
In 2014, Hirway launched the Song Exploder podcast, where musicians break down one of their songs and the creative process that went into it. Hirway is the host, producer, and editor. The show was named Podcast of the Year by Quartz in 2015, Best of iTunes in 2015, and Best Music Podcast in 2017 and 2018 by the Academy of Podcasters.

In 2016, along with actor Joshua Malina, Hirway created The West Wing Weekly podcast. The show is an episode-by-episode discussion of The West Wing, featuring guests from the cast and crew, as well as real-life political figures like Canadian Prime Minister Justin Trudeau, then-mayor Pete Buttigieg and White House Chief of Staff Ronald Klain.

Hirway is the host, producer, and editor of the Partners podcast, which features two people in noteworthy partnerships telling the story of how they met and how their dynamics work. In the show's trailer, he says, “Every successful partnership, no matter what kind, is sort of a love story.” Vanity Fair called Partners one of the podcasts that defined 2020.

Along with chef and author Samin Nosrat, Hirway co-hosts the Home Cooking podcast, which they launched at the start of the COVID-19 pandemic. It won the 2021 iHeartRadio award for Best Food Show, and was named one of the best podcasts of 2020 by Time, Rolling Stone, Vulture, The Economist, and The Atlantic.

=== Television ===
In 2020, Hirway adapted Song Exploder into a series for Netflix with Oscar-winning director and producer Morgan Neville. Hirway served as host and executive producer. The series features the artists Alicia Keys, Lin-Manuel Miranda, R.E.M., Ty Dolla Sign, Dua Lipa, Nine Inch Nails, Natalia Lafourcade, and The Killers. In each episode, the artists break down one of their songs and tell the story of how it was made. In The New York Times review, Pulitzer Prize-winning critic Wesley Morris called it "exhilarating TV".

== Discography ==
=== Albums ===
- In the Last Hour of Light (2026), Keeled Scales
- Rooms I Used to Call My Own (2022)
- The Red Lantern (2020), Translucence
- Heaven Is Attached by a Slender Thread (2011), Dangerbird Records
- This Too Will Pass (2007), Dangerbird Records
- A Name Writ in Water (2004), Level Plane Records
- The Hum of the Electric Air! (2002), Translucence

=== EPs ===
- MOORS (2013)
- Accidents and Good Intentions (2012)
- On the Shore of the Wide World (2005), Level Plane
- An Assembly (2003), Translucence
- A Cloud's Fear of Kites : A Kite's Fear of Heights (2000), Garbage Czar

=== Singles ===
- "What's Next?" (featuring Lin-Manuel Miranda) (2017)
- "Between There and Here" (featuring Yo-Yo Ma) (2021)
- "Home" (feat. Jay Som) (2022)

=== Guest appearances ===
- alias - "The Weathering", on Resurgam (2008) (as The One AM Radio)
- Caural - "Cold Hands", on Mirrors for Eyes (2006) (as The One AM Radio)
- Daedelus - "Thanatopsis", on Exquisite Corpse (2005) (as Hrishikesh Hirway)
- Diplo - Under Ancient Skies (as Hrishikesh Hirway)

=== Remixes ===
- Jenny Owen Youngs - Vampire Weeknight (The One AM Radio Remix) (2020)
- ALA.NI - "Cherry Blossom (Moors Remix)" (2017)
- Girls - "Slow Magic (Moors Remix)" (2015)
- James Vincent McMorrow - "Cavalier (Moors Remix)" (2015)
- Lusine - "Arterial (Moors Remix)" (2015)
- Baths - "Miasma Sky (Moors Remix)" (2014)
- Now, Now - Thread (The One AM Radio Remix) (2013)
- Sea Wolf - "Old Friend (The One AM Radio Remix feat. Abigail Spencer) (2013)
- Poliça - "Wandering Star" (The One AM Radio Remix) (2012)
- Giraffage feat. XXYYXX - "Even Though (The One AM Radio Remix)" (2012)
- Dntel - "Rock My Boat (The One AM Radio Version)" (2011)
- Baths - "Hall (The One AM Radio Remix feat. The Los Feliz Ladies Choir)" (2010)
- James Figurine - "Apologies (The One AM Radio Remix)" (2009)
- Lymbyc Systym - "Astrology Days (Remix by The One AM Radio)" (2008)
- Silversun Pickups - "Little Lover's So Polite (The One AM Radio Remix)" (2007)

=== Production ===
- Eulogies by Eulogies, co-producer (Dangerbird, 2007)
- Here Anonymous by Eulogies, co-producer (Dangerbird, 2009)

=== Scoring ===
- Companion (feature film, Warner Bros. Pictures) (2025)
- The Red Lantern (video game, Timberline Studio) (2020)
- Everything Sucks! (television series, Netflix) (2018)
- Our Nixon (documentary film, CNN Films) (2013)
- Save the Date (feature film, IFC Films) (2012)

=== Themes ===
Hirway has written the theme songs for several podcasts:

- Song Exploder (2014)
- What's the Point? (FiveThirtyEight, 2015)
- It's a Long Story (Sydney Opera House, 2016)
- The West Wing Weekly (2016)
- 30 for 30 Podcasts (ESPN, 2017)
- The Jump (Mailchimp, 2019)
- Home Cooking (2020)
- Partners (2020)

== Podcasts ==
- Song Exploder (host and creator, 2014 to present, Radiotopia)
- Home Cooking (co-host and producer, 2020 to present, Radiotopia)
- The West Wing Weekly (co-host and producer, 2016 to 2020, Radiotopia)
- Partners (host and creator, 2020, Mailchimp and Radiotopia)
- The Jump (executive producer, 2019 to present, Mailchimp)
- City Soundtracks (host, 2017, Google)
