= Lost Notes =

Music podcast by KCRW

Related
- Website: www.kcrw.com/culture/shows/lost-notes

Lost Notes is a music podcast that was hosted by Jessica Hopper and later hosted by Hanif Abdurraqib and produced by KCRW.

== Background ==
The first two seasons of the podcast were hosted by Jessica Hopper. The second season dedicates three episodes to lost music. The season two finale discusses gun violence at concerts. The third season of the podcast, Lost Notes 1980, discusses musicians The Sugarhill Gang, Grace Jones, Miriam Makeba, and Hugh Masekela. There are seven episodes in the third season of Lost Notes. Season three was hosted by Hanif Abdurraqib.

== Reception ==
Nicholas Quah wrote in Vulture that the podcast is an "excellent music-documentary" that is "genuinely beautiful". Sarah Larson wrote in The New Yorker that the podcast is "bursting with melody and insight". Emma Carey wrote in Esquire that the podcast is a "thoughtful meditation". Steve Greene wrote in IndieWire that the podcast is "profound" and is "a tribute to the idea that music is something made to be rediscovered". Peter Larsen wrote in The Orange County Register that the podcast digs "deep into history and meaning with strong standalone narratives". The show won the Directors' Choice Award at the 2021 Third Coast International Audio Festival.
