= Jack Maple =

American police officer

- Born: September 23, 1952; Richmond Hill, New York, U.S.
- Died: August 4, 2001 (aged 48); Manhattan, New York City, U.S.
- Other name: The Jackster
- Police career
- Department: NYC Transit PD (1970–1992); Boston PD (1992–1994) NYPD (1994–1996)
- Rank: Deputy Commissioner of Operations and Crime Control Strategies

Jack Maple (September 23, 1952 – August 4, 2001) was a New York City Transit officer who is remembered for holding the first newly created position of deputy police commissioner for operations and crime control strategies, succeeded by Ed Norris. He created the CompStat methodology of crime fighting and law enforcement strategy, co-authored the book The Crime Fighter, and inspired the television series The District.

== Early life and education ==
John Edward Maple was born in 1952 and grew up in Richmond Hill, New York on the corner of Forest Park at 108th Street and Park Lane South.

He attended Brooklyn Technical High School for four years and followed the Aeronautical Engineering major. He worked odd jobs during the day and earned his high school diploma equivalence at night.

== Career ==
Maple became a transit police officer, during a time when the position was considered one of the most dangerous jobs in New York. Maple rose from an undercover detective patrolling Times Square and the 42nd Street station at Eighth Avenue to the rank of Lieutenant in the New York City Transit Police.

=== COMPSTAT ===
Robberies were the majority of violent crime in the subways. Maple tracked the robberies by pinpointing them on several hundred maps on his wall. Some officers called the maps "wall paper." Maple called the maps the "Charts of the Future". He used them to discern underground crime patterns and dispatched police officers accordingly. Maple noticed by placing officers at these locations, the robberies were being displaced to other areas of the subway. He dispatched officers in what he called a "rapid response". Crime was reduced in the subway by 27% using Maple's methods.

Bill Bratton, head of the New York transit police department while Maple worked as a lieutenant, noticed that Maple's way of crime fighting showed a dramatic decrease in robberies. When Bratton was promoted to police commissioner in 1994, he took Maple with him as Deputy Police Commissioner to One Police Plaza. Maple called his strategy computer analysis of computer statistics—COMPSTAT.

The COMPSTAT program revolutionized the department and became a symbol of police accountability. Maple would have weekly COMPSTAT strategy meetings. COMPSTAT has become innovative in police departments across the nation. Almost every mid to large city in the U.S. has implemented COMPSTAT in their department's crime fighting.

== Later life and death ==
60 Minutes aired a special on the new crime fighting technique, including Maple and Bratton. Maple and Bratton became known as the Crime Fighting Kings. Maple and one of Bratton's aides, John Linder, founded a police consultant business and traveled around the country to help police departments with their crime problems.

The New Orleans Police Foundation, a group concerned about crime and police ineffectiveness in New Orleans, hired Maple and Linder for $1 million in consulting fees. New Orleans' per-capita murder rate was five times that of New York, with almost one person murdered each day.

Maple implemented COMPSTAT in New Orleans. In 1996, crime statistics in New Orleans went down 22 percent in nine months and kept going down for four and half years. In late 1997, Ed Bradley returned to New Orleans for another 60 Minutes special. He did a glowing report, reporting that with COMPSTAT in New Orleans, it is becoming one of the safest cities in America.

More cities hired Maple and Linder as consultants, including Newark, New Jersey, Baltimore, Maryland, and Istanbul, Turkey. In 1999, Maple co-wrote a book, The Crime Fighter: Putting the Bad Guys Out of Business, published by Doubleday. Maple also began to co-write the prototype for the weekly television series The District.

During this time, Maple was diagnosed with colon cancer. He still had a sense of humor, dismissing it as a bump in the road. The cancer progressed very rapidly though. Maple said that he wanted his funeral in the late afternoon, and he wanted the procession to go up 42nd Street, past Grand Central Terminal right around rush hour. He knew it would tie up traffic, saying "For once they could wait for the fat cop". At Maple's funeral, Mayor Rudy Giuliani hailed him as a great innovator in law enforcement who helped make New York City the safest large city in the U.S. He died of cancer in 2001 at age 48.

== Personal life ==
Maple was known as a sharp dresser. He would be seen walking around the city wearing a Homburg hat, polished wing-tipped shoes with spats, and a tailored three-piece suit with a bow tie. He was photographed by photographer Helmut Newton in 1996 in a session to Vanity Fair.

The April 11, 1983 issue of New York Magazine contains an article on Maple, called "The Cop Who Loved the Oak Bar"; the article was written by Michael Daly, and appears on pages 34–37.

Maple left behind his wife, Bridgette, and his son, Brendan, who is now an NYPD Detective.

== Media portrayals ==
Domenick Lombardozzi portrayed Jack Maple in the third season of the HBO series The Deuce.

Police appointments
Preceded by Position established	Deputy Commissioner of Operations and Crime Control Strategies, New York City Police Department; 1994-1996	Succeeded by Ed Norris
