= CompStat =

Police management system created by the New York City Police Department

CompStat (also written COMPSTAT) is a police management system created by the New York City Police Department in 1994 with assistance from the New York City Police Foundation. Today, variations of the system are used in police departments worldwide. Under CompStat, the police department keeps a daily-updated digital record of crimes reported and in weekly meetings the department's leadership gathers to review trends in the data. During its early years, it was credited with decreased crime rates in NYC, though scholars are divided on whether it played a role. It has also been criticized in NYC for leading to data manipulation and increased stop-and-frisk searches.

== Origins ==
CompStat (in NYPD it is said to be short for "compare stats", but in LAPD it is said to be short for “computer statistics”) is a management system created in April 1994 by Bill Bratton and Jack Maple, whom Bratton met while he was chief of the New York City Transit Police and later hired as the NYPD's top anti-crime specialist when he became Police Commissioner in 1993. CompStat began as weekly meetings at One Police Plaza where officers were randomly selected from precincts and quizzed about crime trends in their districts and how to respond. At the time, the NYPD collected crime statistics every 6 months; under threat of transfers, they began to collect information daily. In February 1994, the department heads provided a hand count of major crimes in the first 6 weeks of 1993 and 1994.

Maple drafted junior staffer John Yohe to modify an existing program (known as "compare stats", and that name became the basis for the CompStat name) to analyze the data. It was originally run on Informix's SmartWare desktop office system before being replaced by Microsoft's FoxPro database for business. The Patrol Bureau's staff computerized the information provided by department heads and created the first 'CompStat' book, collating the information by precinct, patrol borough, and city. The New York City Police Foundation significantly funded the NYPD's initial development of the program; they also acquired and gifted the department the first CompStat system.

The weekly CompStat sessions were initially open to the public and commanders would be denigrated by management if they had failed; three-quarters were dismissed over 18 months for failing to bring the numbers down. The sessions were closed to the public in the late 2000s but since 2010 have been more amiable with commanders sent DVD recordings of sessions for review.

== Impact ==
CompStat shifted the focus of the NYPD from 'service and the beat cop' to 'crime and commanding officers': a greater emphasis was placed on issuing formal arrests and summonses and the NYPD shifted towards a centralized and top-down scientific management approach. Crime rates decreased while CompStat was implemented, leading to widespread public praise of the program. At the same time, civilian complaints against the NYPD increased. Scholars have inconclusively debated whether CompStat played a role. Proponents of CompStat have argued that the program was responsible for the decrease, others have noted decreases in other cities with different policing models during the same period.

An anonymous survey of retired high-ranking police officials found that pressure to reduce crime prompted some supervisors and precinct commanders to distort crime statistics. In 2010 NYPD officer Adrian Schoolcraft released recordings of his superiors urging him to manipulate data: his captain demanded an increase in summonses issued under threat of retaliation. In 2014 Justice Quarterly published an article stating that there was statistical evidence of the NYPD manipulating CompStat data. A 2021 study found that CompStat led to an increase in minor arrests but no impact on serious crime and led police to engage in data manipulation. In Floyd v. City of New York (2013), Judge Scheindlin ruled that CompStat led to pressure to conduct more stop-and-frisk searches without review of their constitutionality and "resulted in the disproportionate and discriminatory stopping of blacks and Hispanics".

Bratton heavily marketed CompStat and used it to market himself in the press. When he became the LAPD Chief of Police in 2002, he quickly installed the system there as well. In 2004, a survey found 11% and 32% of small and large police departments respectively had adopted a CompStat-like program. A 2011 survey by the Police Executive Research Forum (PERFS) found that 79% of their member agencies utilized CompStat and 52% had begun using it between 2006 and 2010. The program has been adopted globally, notably in the United Kingdom, France, Canada, Australia, and Mexico. A report by the Brennan Center for Justice in 2016 found that mass incarceration had a minimal effect on reducing crime in the United States but CompStat had a modest one. It noted that the NYPD's implementation might be an outlier due to its size and unique implementation. The program has also been adopted as an all-purpose management technique; in 2010 Mayor Bloomberg had every city service subjected to a CompStat-like evaluation.

== Notable Persons ==
- Jack Maple, First person to be created Deputy Commissioner of Operations and Crime Control Strategies (1994-1996) and Louis Anemone, Chief of Department (1995-1999) and Chief of Patrol (1994-1995)
- John Timoney (police officer), Chief of Department (1994-1995)
- Edward Norris, Deputy Commissioner (1996-2000)
- Joseph Dunne, Chief of Department (1999-2000)
- Garry McCarthy, Deputy Commissioner (2000-2006)
- Joseph Esposito, Chief of Department (2000-2013)
- Phil Pulaski, Deputy Commissioner (2006-2009)
- Patrick Timlin, Deputy Commissioner (2010-2012)
- John Bilich, Deputy Commissioner (2012-2014)
- Dermot Shea, Deputy Commissioner and Chief of Crime Control Strategies (2014-2018)
- Lori Pollack, Chief of Crime Control Strategies (2018-2019)
- Michael LiPetri, Chief of Crime Control Strategies (2019-present)

== In popular culture ==
- In the CBS TV series The District, inspired by the real-life experience of former New York Deputy Police Commissioner Jack Maple, statistics clerk Ella Mae Farmer (played by Lynne Thigpen) was shown to be a wiz at using the system, which proved invaluable to the success of Washington, D.C. Police Chief Jack Mannion and to the department, and which contributed to her promotion from an obscure position located in an out-of-the-way office to Director of Administrative Services.
- The Law and Order: SVU episode "Limitations" features a NYPD CompStat meeting at One Police Plaza.
- The system is shown in use in The Wire on HBO, though in the show it is referred to as "ComStat". This was accurate to the real world Baltimore Police Department, however, after the show had concluded, a similar system known as "CitiStat" replaced it.
- The podcast Reply All aired two episodes regarding CompStat, titled "The Crime Machine Part I" and "The Crime Machine Part II".

== See also ==
- Crime mapping
