= Eulogies (band) =

American rock band based in Los Angeles, California, US

- Origin: Los Angeles, California
- Genres: Indie rock Indie pop
- Years active: 2008 – 2012
- Labels: Dangerbird Records
- Members: Peter Walker; Drew Phillips; Chris Reynolds; Garrett Deloian
- Past members: Tim Hutton
- Website: Official site

Eulogies was an American rock band based in Los Angeles, California. The final lineup consisted of Peter Walker on guitar and vocals, Drew Phillips on guitar, Chris Reynolds on drums, and Ashley Dzerigian on bass.

Former Eulogies bass player Tim Hutton and Chris Reynolds originally began playing with Peter Walker under the aegis of his solo work. After touring the US extensively in 2006, the trio was reborn under the name Eulogies. Drew Phillips joined the band in 2008, while Garrett Deloian joined the band in January 2009 (replacing bassist Tim Hutton, who left Eulogies shortly after recording resumed for their second album). They are signed to Los Angeles indie label Dangerbird Records, through which they released their self-titled debut album on September 11, 2007. The album was co-produced by fellow Dangerbird labelmate Hrishikesh Hirway (The One A.M. Radio). Eulogies toured North America in support of that album in summer 2007 with Sea Wolf and in fall 2007 with Film School.

A second album, entitled Here Anonymous, was released on April 7, 2009, and was preceded by the EP Tempted to Do Nothing on November 4, 2008. North American tour dates with The Dears and Middle Distance Runner followed in spring 2009.

Their third and final full-length album, Tear The Fences Down, was released on January 18, 2011 exclusively on digital and vinyl formats. The CD version was released in March 2011.

== Discography ==
=== Albums ===
- Eulogies (September 11, 2007)
- Here Anonymous (April 7, 2009)
- Tear the Fences Down (January 18, 2011)

=== Singles ===
- "If I Knew You" (2007, Dangerbird Records)
- "Two Can Play" (featuring Nikki Monninger of Silversun Pickups) (2009, Dangerbird Records)
- "You Hide" (2010, Dangerbird Records)

== EPs ==
- Tempted to Do Nothing EP (November 4, 2008, Dangerbird Records)

== Appearances in television shows and movies ==
- Eulogies' song "One Man" was played in episode 10 ("The Devil's Threesome") of the American television drama Californication.
- Peter Walker's song "39 Stars," from his 2006 solo album Young Gravity, featured in the thrift store scene of the 2008 film The Wrestler.
- Eulogies' song "Day to Day" was played in the film Leap Year and In USA Network's Royal Pains Television Show.
- "Bad Connection", "Anyone Here?" and "Under The Knife" have been featured in the ABC Family show "Kyle XY"
- Eulogies' have had the songs "(The Fight) I've Come To Like", "Eyes On The Prize", "Tempted To Do Nothing", "Big Eyes" and "Under The Knife" in A&E's "The Cleaner" starring former "Law and Order" star, Benjamin Bratt.
- "(The Fight) I've Come To Like" was also played in the college comedy television show, "Greek" that is on the ABC Family network.
- "The City", a spinoff of MTV's "The Hills", and USA network's "Royal Pains" has also played has Eulogies' "Day to Day"
- CW network show, "Reaper" has played "Running In The Rain"
- "Two Can Play", a duet with Silversun Pickups' Nikki Monninger, was featured in the ABC Family series Make It or Break It.
