= Song Exploder =

Music podcast

- Genre: Music podcast
- Language: English

Cast and voices
- Hosted by: Hrishikesh Hirway (2014–18, 2019–present); Thao Nguyen (2018–19)

Production
- Production: Hrishikesh Hirway (Exec.)

Publication
- No. of episodes: 314 (as of May 20, 2026) (Note: 333, including Bonus episodes, Specials, and "Key Change", etc.)
- Original release: January 1, 2014
- Provider: Maximum Fun (2014–15); Radiotopia (2015–present)

Related
- Website: Song Exploder

Song Exploder is a music podcast created and hosted by Hrishikesh Hirway, which debuted in January 2014. It is part of the Radiotopia podcast network from PRX. The show features musicians talking about the creative process behind an individual song while breaking down the song into its component parts. In 2020, the podcast was adapted into a Netflix original series.

The podcast launched on the Maximum Fun network, became independent in February 2015 and joined Radiotopia in June 2015.

== Format ==
Each episode begins with the host introducing the show's featured musician (or musicians) and giving a brief history of the musical act or television program with which they are associated. The artist then discusses the creative process used in the creation of a particular song. This may include anything from songwriting to recording to post-production. The discussion is interspersed with short clips of separate tracks from the song isolated to illustrate the topics being discussed – for example, the drum track might be played to demonstrate how a particular beat was used in the song. The episode ends by playing a recording of the featured song in its entirety. Hirway edits his side of the conversation out of the recording with the purpose of condensing the contents of the podcast around the song's creation and how the artist brought it to life.

== Subjects ==
Song Exploder has taken a deep-dive into more than 200 tracks, including: Kiss from a Rose with Seal and Trevor Horn and into Blue Monday with Peter Hook—formerly of New Order.

Furthermore, the podcast has also analysed theme music from Downton Abbey and Game of Thrones, as well as music from La La Land and Moonlight.

== Reception ==
The show receives generally positive reception and has been featured at the Sundance Film Festival, SXSW, Noise Pop Festival, and Moogfest.Vulture said, "Song Exploder is probably the best use of the podcast format ever," and named it one of the Top 10 Podcasts of 2015. It was also named Best of iTunes in 2015, and Quartz named it the Best Podcast of 2015, saying, "It is possibly the most perfect podcast, really." Pete Naughton of The Daily Telegraph called Song Exploder an "excellent podcast" and placed it on his list of top music podcasts in August 2014. The A.V. Club praised the podcast's "beautiful production and thoughtful editing" in June 2014. It has also received favorable reviews from Spin, Gizmodo, Slate, and The Atlantic.

Creator Hirway has discussed Song Exploder at conferences like the Google Design Conference and AIGA Design Conference. In 2016, the Sydney Opera House hosted a Song Exploder Residency.

The show won the 2016 and 2017 Academy of Podcasters award for best music podcast.

=== Awards ===
Award	Year	Category	Result	Ref.
Academy of Podcasters	2015	Music & Commentary	Finalist	
Academy of Podcasters	2016	Music & Commentary	Won	
Academy of Podcasters	2017	Music	Won	
iHeartRadio Podcast Awards	2019	Best Music Podcast	Nominated	
iHeartRadio Podcast Awards	2020	Best Music Podcast	Nominated	
iHeartRadio Podcast Awards	2021	Best Music Podcast	Nominated	
iHeartRadio Podcast Awards	2022	Best Music Podcast	Won	
Adweek Podcast Awards	2021	Best Creativity Podcast	Won	
Webby Awards	2022	Best Music Podcast	Won	

== TV show ==
On September 17, 2020, a television series based on the podcast was announced, which premiered on October 2, 2020 on Netflix, with 4 episodes:

Series overview
Season	Episodes	Originally released
Volume 1	4	October 2, 2020
Volume 2	4	December 15, 2020

=== Volume 1 (2020) ===
No. overall	No. in season	Title	Original release date
1	1	"Alicia Keys: 3 Hour Drive"	October 2, 2020
Far from her newborn son, Alicia Keys collaborates with Sampha, who has just lost his mother. Together, they give a longing melody life.
2	2	"Lin-Manuel Miranda: Wait for It"	October 2, 2020
In his quest to capture Aaron Burr's voice, Lin-Manuel Miranda finds his lines on the subway. Many breathless choruses later, can he relate to Burr?
3	3	"R.E.M: Losing My Religion"	October 2, 2020
No obvious chorus plus a lead mandolin and handclaps equals the least likely chart-topper of the '90s. R.E.M. looks back at the life-changing track.
4	4	"Ty Dolla $ign: LA"	October 2, 2020
Ty Dolla $ign pens a verse in minutes, picks up multiple instruments and brings in Kendrick Lamar and Brandy for this moving love song to his city.

=== Volume 2 (2020) ===
No. overall	No. in season	Title	Original release date
5	1	"Dua Lipa: Love Again"	December 15, 2020
When a bad breakup spills into the studio, Dua Lipa finds release in high-drama strings, throwback analog synths and memories of her parents' faves.
6	2	"The Killers: When You Were Young"	December 15, 2020
Eager to beat the sophomore album slump, the Killers dusted off three chords to capture their desert home of Las Vegas — and mine for pop anthem gold.
7	3	"Nine Inch Nails: Hurt"	December 15, 2020
Broken-down sounds, damaged vocals and naked emotion make a chilling coda to a blockbuster LP as Trent Reznor talks about transforming pain into art.
8	4	"Natalia Lafourcade: Hasta la Raíz"	December 15, 2020
After stepping back from stardom, Natalia Lafourcade rediscovers her roots, which are planted deep in Veracruz and the rhythm of huapango folk music.

== See also ==
- Music podcast
