= Breakmaster Cylinder =

American musician

- Also known as: The Mysterious Breakmaster Cylinder; BmC; The Master
- Born: unknown United States
- Genres: Soundtracks; Hip hop Electronic dance music
- Occupation: Composer
- Instruments: Piano, synthesizers
- Years active: 2006–present
- Website: www.breakmastercylinder.com

Breakmaster Cylinder, also known as The Mysterious Breakmaster Cylinder, by the initials BmC, or simply as "The Master,” is a musical composer and producer who has provided title themes and background music for a number of radio shows and podcasts. Cylinder came to notoriety with the launch of Gimlet Media's Reply All in 2016 and was a fixture on that show until it ended in 2022. Known for their pseudonymity, Breakmaster Cylinder does not make public appearances and has employed stand-ins for interviews, photographs, and other media engagements.

== Development and early career ==
Breakmaster Cylinder grew up playing piano, learning to perform classical compositions by Johann Sebastian Bach and others. They first began working with music sampling using ping-pong recording techniques between two cassette tape decks, and then later acquired a keyboard with loop-recording capabilities. Cylinder's first releases were DIY albums of trance music made just for friends. Cylinder spent more than a decade composing and producing music before finding a wider audience.

In 2006 Breakmaster Cylinder self-released their first album Spasmodic Symmetry, followed by 2009's Logic Pro-driven Method Man/Monty Python mashup Dolomite! Cylinder's next albums, Say Hello to Klaus (2010) and See You Around (2011) were released under the Breakbit Music label. In 2013, Cylinder started to get some press with the release of Big Schnitzel, an audio mash-up sampling food references made by the Notorious B.I.G.

In their early days as a composer, Cylinder worked as a food delivery driver and often wrote music while parked on the side of the road. They produced many of their early works using a Novation Launchpad mini drum machine and Fruityloops software before switching to the Cubase digital audio workstation. Aside from Bach as a recurring theme in their music and imagery, Breakmaster Cylinder has also cited Art Tatum, The Beatles, Nine Inch Nails, and Squarepusher as influences on their work.

== Podcasting work ==
"Stumpbox"
Theme used for the Reply All podcast's "Super Tech Support" segment.

Cylinder's career took off after scoring the theme for TL;DR, an internet-themed segment hosted by Alex Goldman and PJ Vogt for the WNYC Studios public radio program On the Media. Goldman enlisted Cylinder as the show's composer after seeing a music video that they had made for their remix of The Chordettes' song "Mr. Sandman" set to a montage of film clips from horror cinema. Goldman and Vogt then brought Cylinder along to Gimlet Media when they started the podcast Reply All, for which Cylinder also composed the beginning and closing themes. In an interview for Hrishikesh Hirway’s podcast Song Exploder, Cylinder revealed that they derived Reply All's opening theme's chord structure from Bach's "Prelude in C Major" mixed with acoustically recorded drums, a MIDI-derived bass line, and the sounds of rolling jars, spinning coins, and a hammer shattering a small glass. By episode 16 of Reply All, Cylinder had contributed some 25 audio pieces to the show's music library for use as themes in various recurring segments, as well as music beds to convey moods in the show's journalistic pieces. These themes would grow to number in the hundreds by the time Reply All ran its final episode in June 2022.

Cylinder also created satirical cut-ups from pieces of Reply All episodes that were run post-show as incentive for continued listenership through the podcast's end credits and final ad block. For one season of Reply All, this idea was expanded into a serialized audio story that appeared at the end of each episode. The space opera-esque serial featured Cylinder and a canine companion, known as "Dog", visiting alien planets while lost in outer space without any guidance from the internet. In 2020 Cylinder released the series as the album, BMC and Dog In Space: The Complete Series, via multiple online platforms.

Reply All's success led to Cylinder taking jobs creating themes for more than 60 other podcasts in the next three years, as well as music for film, advertisements, and video games. In 2015, Cylinder collaborated—via Twitter and Dropbox—with the Switched on Pop podcast to reconstruct then-current compositions by Justin Bieber. In 2018 Cylinder collaborated with fellow pseudonymous media artist Zardulu to produce the track "Ablanathanalba" following Reply All's exposé on Zardulu's viral Pizza Rat phenomenon.

After an open-source theme for a Changelog podcast appeared in a Disney commercial, The Changelog’s founders commissioned Breakmaster Cylinder to compose and produce the theme music for all of their podcasts as a means of ensuring that their theme music would be unique while also unifying the sound of all of the podcasts across the network. in 2023 Cylinder compiled and released their themes for Changelog’s podcasts into a pair of albums catalogued as Volume 0 and Volume 1, followed by Changelog Beats Volumes [2]: Dance Party in 2024 and Changelog Beats Volumes [3]: After Party in 2025.

Breakmaster Cylinder licenses all of their music through their own publishing company, Person B (stylized as Person^{♭}) Productions. Since 2015, Cylinder has curated their assorted radio and podcasting themes into several albums, each titled Songs for Broadcast followed by a volume number. In December 2022 Cylinder announced that the ninth volume would be the last because "it caps a trilogy of trilogies". Cylinder released a tenth volume of Songs for Broadcast in 2024 and an eleventh volume in 2025.

== Albums and collaborators ==
"Paint Your Grandma's Portrait"
Sound clip of Breakmaster Cylinder's work with rapper and frequent collaborator Dislotec.

Many of Breakmaster Cylinder's albums are thematic, and include mixtapes, collections of ringtones, and music made for podcasts. The 2014 album Pineapple Princess was partially derived from hearing Alanis Morissette’s music being played in supermarket produce sections. The 2017 album Pickled Beets Part III features a year's worth of weekly submissions to the Stones Throw Records beat-writing competition, Stones Throw Beat Battle. One of these submissions, "Drumcorpscore" was designed to be a backing track for Britney Spears’ song "Toxic". "Drumcorpscore" and many other of the weekly submission tracks were later repurposed, with samples removed, for use in scoring Reply All. Also in 2017, Cylinder remixed a version of the traditional folk song "Down by the Bay" as sung by popular children's music artist Raffi. Breakmaster Cylinder explained, "That song says it isn't safe to go home because Mom will say some crazy shit to you, which is a weird message for a children's song, but is actually how many adults I know feel about [going home for the holidays]." Cylinder released this, along with two other political songs on the Singable Songs For The Increasingly Enraged EP and included a note encouraging fans to donate to Planned Parenthood, an organization for which Cylinder had previously fundraised with their music.

Cylinder has also been known to use their craft to mess with public radio culture as heard in their parodic remixes of radio themes such as that of Morning Edition. A reviewer described Cylinder’s mash-up "The NPR Drop" as "a wonderfully bizarre amalgamation of dubstep, Lakshmi Singh, and the All Things Considered horns."

Breakmaster Cylinder is a proponent of the indie music site Bandcamp through which they make all of their music available to stream or download. A decade of collaboration with rapper Dislotec resulted in a series of singles released from 2015–2019 and an album issued as a reward to Cylinder's Kickstarter backers. Also in 2019, Cylinder collaborated with Australian comedian Bec Hill on her live show I'll Be Bec, which was filmed for online video streaming just before the coronavirus pandemic.

== Persona ==
Since Cylinder's earliest contributions to TL;DR, radio hosts have credited the composer as "The Mysterious Breakmaster Cylinder" and claimed to never have met nor spoken with them, nor to have any knowledge of who Cylinder actually is. Cylinder has perpetuated this mystique of pseudonymity in interviews stating, "I guess the anonymity is interesting", and, "My face (if I have a face) doesn't matter". In the final episode of Reply All, Cylinder revealed that they are a Taurus and have lived in three different sections of the United States.

During his time at Gimlet Media, Reply All host Alex Goldman asserted that he and his staff did not know Cylinder's secret identity. "I found him, or they—we don't really know—on the internet," Goldman said in an interview with the Sydney Morning Herald. "I contacted him and he agreed to work with us, so long as he could remain anonymous." Jerod Santo and Adam Stacoviak from podcasting network The Changelog exclusively use Breakmaster Cylinder's music to score all of their shows, yet claim to not know if Cylinder is a "guy [or] girl—we're not sure if it's one person [or] many people." For an interview with The Secret Room podcast, Cylinder fielded questions through a mix of flying saucer-style mashups of pop songs and an old Speak & Spell on the fritz. In an audio story about Breakmaster Cylinder's compositional and recording techniques, Song Exploder producer Hrishikesh Hirway states, "I interviewed Breakmaster Cylinder, but out of respect for his or her privacy and mystery, I had an actor replace Breakmaster Cylinder's voice... Or did I?".

Cylinder appeared on the July 22, 2025 episode of pop music criticism podcast Switched on Pop, interviewed by host Charlie Harding, in which they appeared to be, and admitted to, using their real voice for the interview. Cylinder answered many questions regarding their desire for anonymity and their history of obscuring their appearance and voice, yet remained evasive about their identity.

It has been speculated on Reddit that the name "Breakmaster Cylinder" is a portmanteau of "breakmaster", a musician who works with breakbeats, and "master cylinder", an automotive component that regulates the brakes of a car, truck, or motorcycle. When asked about their gender, Cylinder has referred to themself using the singular they pronoun. In photographs, Cylinder appears as a head shrouded in a black motorcycle helmet painted with white bug-eyes that are actually a pair of full stop marks that form the base of two exclamation points. Their head is shown on a variety of different bodies and gender expressions, and occasionally on a manipulated portrait of Johann Sebastian Bach. Despite their allure of secrecy, Cylinder has gained repute for responding to fan letters and being easily accessible via the internet.

== Output ==
=== Podcast and radio themes ===
- Absolutely Crushed
- AFK (Changelog)
- All Consuming
- The Axe Files (CNN Audio)
- Battle Born Tech (KNVC FM)
- Be Less Typical
- Ben Franklin's World (Omohundro Institute)
- {Blank}+{Blank}=Fun (Gimlet Media)
- Bleeped
- Blogtacular
- Business Casual (Morning Brew)
- Business/Disrupted
- The Changelog (Changelog Media)
- Completely Optional Knowledge
- Crazy Genius (The Atlantic)
- Creatures
- Darknet Diaries
- Decoder (Vox Media)
- Dedicate It
- Discomfort Zone
- The Drunk Projectionist
- The Europe Desk
- The Ezra Zaid Project
- Fabulous Flying Merkins (Indaba)
- Feminist Furies
- Fictional
- Footloose & Fancy Free
- For The Record
- Founder's Talk (Changelog)
- Gameplay
- Gender Reveal
- Get More Smarter`
- Girl's Girls (Curvy Girl Media)
- Glow Girl (Curvy Girl Media)
- Go Time (Changelog)
- The Greatest Gift
- Hello Monday! (LinkedIn)
- Hit Enter: Stories from the Inbox
- The Hungry Fan
- Hyperfixed (Radiotopia)
- Imagined Life (Wondery)
- Indie Romp
- Into It (Vox Media)
- Jobs Club
- JS Party (Changelog)
- Know It All
- <~> (Less Than, Approximately, Greater Than)
- Meat and Three (Heritage Radio Network)
- Meet Your Maker
- Met Nerds om Tafel
- Methods
- Moonshot (Lawson Media)
- Outside/In
- Nothing Is Boring
- NZZ am Sonntag (NZZ)
- Ohrensessel
- Otakon
- The Payoff (Mic)
- Personal Best (CBC Radio)
- The Pitch (Gimlet Media)
- Play It Back
- PodSAM
- Practical AI (Changelog)
- Preserve This Podcast
- RehabCast
- Reply All (Gimlet Media)
- Request for Commits (Changelog)
- Reset (Vox Media)
- Sandwich Podcast (Sandwich)
- Sanity Podcast
- Say Something Worth Stealing
- The Secret Room
- Ship It (Changelog)
- Sidedoor (Smithsonian Institution)
- Signl.fm
- The Soak
- Soapboxers
- Special Relationship (The Economist)
- Sorry, What?
- Spotlight (Changelog)
- STEM Diversity Podcast
- Stories of Our Times (The Times)
- Switched On Pop
- Talking Points
- There Will Be Spoilers
- Think Again (Big Think)
- The Third Web
- The Ticket
- Time Well Spent
- TL;DR (WNYC Studios)
- Today Explained (Vox Media)
- True North
- Undefined
- UnMonumental
- We The Ppl
- Welcome to Macintosh
- With Good Reason (Virginia Humanities)
- Yarn Stories
- Yes Was
- Yesterday's Technology Tomorrow
- YM Answers
- You Can't Do That
- 88% Parentheticals (Gimlet Media)
- 100% Related? (Gimlet Media)

=== Albums ===
- Spasmodic Symmetry (2006)
- Dolomite! (EP, 2009)
- Remix One (2009)
- Say Hello to Klaus (2010)
- Musique Pour Les Pubs De Nourriture Pour Chiens (2011)
- See You Around (EP, 2011)
- BMC: Remixed (2011)
- Tokyo (EP, 2012)
- Blithering Heights (Mixtape, 2012)
- The BMC Fine Ringtones Collection (2013)
- Remix Two: Short Attention Span Theater (2013)
- Big Schnitzel (EP, 2013)
- Pineapple Princess (EP, 2014)
- Pickled Beets: Part I (2015)
- Songs For Broadcast: part I (2015)
- The BMC Fine Ringtones Collection: 2nd Issue (2015)
- Pickled Beets: Part II (2015)
- Songs For Broadcast: part II (2016)
- BMC: Live From Gimlet's Executive Washroom (2016)
- Songs For Broadcast: part III (2016)
- I Wanna Hear The Music (EP, 2017)
- Pickled Beets: Part III (2017)
- BMC ONE: Video Collection 2007–2017 (2017)
- Songs For Broadcast: part IV (2018)
- Singable Songs For The Increasingly Enraged (EP, 2017)
- Songs For Broadcast: part V (2018)
- Blithering Heights 2 (Mixtape, 2018)
- Songs For Broadcast: part VI (2018)
- Remix Three (2018)
- Mono Planet EP (2019)
- Songs For Broadcast: part VII (2020)
- BMC and Dog In Space: The Complete Series (2020)
- Breakmast of Champions (2020)
- Dead Legends (OST, 2021)
- Songs For Broadcast: part VIII (2022)
- Songs For Broadcast: part IX (2022)
- Mr. Stockdale (OST, 2023)
- The Moon & All That (2023)
- Changelog Beats Volumes [0]: Theme Songs (2023)
- Changelog Beats Volumes [1]: Next Level (2023)
- BMC's Voicemail: Fall 2018 (2023)
- Polter Pals (OST, 2023)
- Songs For Broadcast X (2024)
- Changelog Beats Volumes [2]: Dance Party(2024)
- 12 Months (OST, 2024)
- Slash Quest (OST, 2024)
- Changelog Beats Volumes [3]: After Party (2025)
- Changelog Beats Volumes [2]: Dance Party(2025)
- It's clipping., bmch (EP, 2025)
- Songs For Broadcast XI (2025)

=== Collaborations with Dislotec ===
Singles

- "Solfeggio" (2015)
- "Superflypapertrailblazer" (2016)
- "Warning Signs" (2018)
- "Tiny Marshmallows" (2018)
- "Pitbull" (2018)
- "Westwood" (2018)
- "I Don't Wanna Talk To My Neighbors" (2019)
- "Zombies" b/w “Eject / Reject” (2019)
- "Dollar Of Damage" (2019)

Album

- Tiny Marshmallows (2026)

=== Contributions to other media ===
- Computer Show (scored "computer music" for 1980s TV spoof)
- Life's Wonders (RV series composer)
- MetaLetters DAO (Metaversal)
- Our Story - The Indigenous Led Fight to Protect Greater Chaco (contributed original music to 2022 documentary film)
- Pakistani Reactions (theme for video series)
- Slash Quest (Green Pillow/Noodlecake Games)
