= List of health and wellness podcasts =

The following is a list of health and wellness podcasts.

== List ==
Podcast	Year	Starring, Narrator(s), or Host(s)	Produced by	Ref
Ali On The Run	2019–present	Ali Feller	Independent	
Black Girl In Om	2016–present	Lauren Ash	Independent	
Body Kindness	2016–present	Rebecca Scritchfield	Independent	
Call Your Girlfriend	2014–present	Ann Friedman and Aminatou Sow	Independent	
Get Lit	2019–present	Becki Rabin	Independent	
Goop	2018–present	Gwyneth Paltrow and Erica Chidi	Cadence13	
Kailyns Coffee Talk	2018–present	Kalyn Nicholson	Studio71	
Maintenance Phase	2019–present	Aubrey Gordon, Michael Hobbes	Independent	
Mental Illness Happy Hour	2012–present	Paul Gilmartin	Independent	
Metta Hour	2014–present	Sharon Salzberg	Be Here Now Network	
On Purpose	2019–present	Jay Shetty	Independent	
Soul On Fire	2018–2019	Jordan Younger	Tebalicious	
TEDTalks Health	2020–present	Various	TED	
That’s So Retrograde	2015–present	Elizabeth Kott and Stephanie Simbari	Dear Media	
The Food Heaven Podcast	2015–present	Wendy Lopez and Jessica Jones	Dear Media	
The Highest Self Podcast	2017–present	Sahara Rose	Independent	
The Life Stylist	2019–present	Luke Storey	Independent	
The Mindbodygreen Podcast	2017–present	Jason Wachob	mindbodygreen	
Sawbones	2013–present	Sydnee McElroy and Justin McElroy	Maximum Fun	
Science Vs	2015–present	Wendy Zukerman	Gimlet Media	
Sincerely, Hueman	2017–present	Various	Hueman Group Media	
Sleep With Me	2018–present	Andrew Ackerman	Dearest Scooter	
Stuff Mom Never Told You	2009–present	Anney and Samantha	iHeartRadio	
Ten Percent Happier	2016–present	Dan Harris	Independent	
Unlocking Us	2020–present	Brené Brown	Parcast Network	
