= This American Life (TV series) =

American television series

- Host Ira Glass sitting at his desk in a promotional card
- Directed by: Christopher Wilcha
- Starring: Ira Glass
- Country of origin: United States
- No. of seasons: 2
- No. of episodes: 13

Production
- Executive producers: Ira Glass; Banks Tarver; Ken Druckerman; Christine Vachon; Jocelyn Hayes; Christopher Wilcha
- Running time: 26 minutes

Original release
- Network: Showtime
- Release: March 22, 2007 – May 28, 2009

This American Life is an American television series based on the radio program of the same name. Like the radio program, the series is hosted by Ira Glass. The series premiered on March 22, 2007. Two seasons of the show aired on Showtime. The second season finale aired on September 3, 2008, and Showtime aired one final episode in May 2009.

In September 2009, Glass announced that he and the other creators of the show had "asked to be taken off TV", largely in part to the difficult schedule required to produce a television program. He went on to state that the show is officially "on hiatus", but would like to do a television special at some point in the future. From January 10 to April 4, 2011, Current TV re-aired the series in its entirety.

== Adaptation for television ==
The television version of This American Life is a twofold shift in media from public radio to commercial television. The TAL staff had already attempted to move their program to television once before in 1999. Even though two different networks offered to screen a pilot, the TAL staff ultimately decided that it would be too difficult to make a television show that reflected its already successful weekly radio show. In 2002, Showtime offered to shoot a pilot, to which the TAL staff eventually agreed. In 2007, the first episode, "Reality Check", aired on television. When the staff was asked why the show moved to a commercial television station, Showtime, instead of public television (i.e., PBS), it responded that Showtime invited them to do a television show while PBS did not. This American Life still runs weekly on public radio distributed by the program's producers through Public Radio Exchange (formerly distributed by Public Radio International, which was merged into PRX in 2018).

== Episodes ==
=== Season 1 (2007) ===
No.	Title	Original release date
1	"Reality Check"	March 22, 2007
Plans that started out as a good idea or a dream come true, but turn sour: the unpleasant experience known as a "reality check". All of the stories had been aired previously on the radio show, but were developed into film for the TV series.: Prologue: Pee Girl – Heather McElhatton; Act I. If by Chance We Meet Again – Jane Feltes/Ira Glass (originally from radio episode #291); Ralph and Sandra Fisher's gentle and beloved Brahman bull "Chance" was nearing the end of his long life. The Fishers couldn't bear to live without Chance, so they asked researchers at Texas A&M University to clone him–the result being the first ever bull clone, whom they dub "Second Chance". But Second Chance is not as gentle as his namesake.; Act II. The Spy Who Loved Everyone – Jorge Just (originally from radio episode #286); The flash mob group Improv Everywhere decides to give Vermont band Ghosts of Pasha their "Best Gig Ever" and pack a small club posing as highly devoted fans. But when the band realizes it was a prank, the effect is devastating.
2	"My Way"	March 29, 2007
An exploration of the benefits and costs of stubbornness.: Prologue: Side by Side – Ira Glass interviews Larry Wegielski, a man who spends several hours a day with his wife, in the family mausoleum.; Act I. Untitled – Ira Glass; Joe Kendrick, age 14, doesn't want to fall in love. Thus, he has chosen to never fall in love.; Act II. And Nothing but the Truth – Nazanin Rafsanjani; Dr. Brad Blanton ran for Congress in 2006 under a platform of Radical Honesty, i.e. refusing to lie.; Act III. Still Life – Josh Seftel (part of his upcoming documentary feature); Photographer Marcus Halevi discusses a sequence of tragic photos he took that led him to change his career path.
3	"God's Close-Up"	April 5, 2007
Stories where the faithful and the not-so-faithful cross paths, and where unexpected things happen when people try to get closer to God through pictures: hundreds of Polaroid camera-toting believers gather in the Mojave Desert each month hoping to see God. And an artist, his Jesus model, the model's atheist girlfriend, and her religious father face off over The Last Supper.
4	"The Cameraman"	April 12, 2007
Stories of how people act differently behind the camera can change a person, even if the camera isn't real.: Prologue: Untitled – Cartoonist Chris Ware illustrates a story of an elementary school art project and how a camera, even though it wasn't real, changed the way kids acted; Act 1. The Cameraman; G. J. Echternkamp makes a documentary of his family life in order to humiliate his parents (particularly his step-father, who was the bass player for the 1980s pop band OXO) for all the trouble they caused him. However, while doing this, he uncovers another side of his parents.
5	"Growth Spurt"	April 19, 2007
What do you do if you don't like where you are in life? You simply decide to move forward into the next stage by sheer force of will. A widow; an ambitious, first-time screenwriter; and a 13-year-old girl all charge forward into their futures with uneven results. The first-time filmmaker is screenwriter Susan Knode, who produced her short "Bandida" with help from her cohort at the Burbank Senior Arts Colony.
6	"Pandora's Box"	April 26, 2007
Three stories of consequences that follow from human beings doing what we do best: poking our noses everywhere, fixing things that may or may not be broken, and opening our big mouths. A hot dog stand in Chicago unleashes dark forces in the human soul and scientists try, unsuccessfully, to create perfect pigs.

=== Season 2 (2008−09) ===
No.	Title	Original release date
7	"Escape"	May 4, 2008
People escaping home without going very far away. In Philadelphia, teenaged boys find ways to impress girls and break out of the confines of their families, using technology that's been obsolete in their neighborhood since the 19th century. And a mother and son get caught up in a fight that many kids have with their parents. Except in their case, due to some very specialized circumstances, they go through the fight in slow motion, over the course of years.
8	"Two Wars"	May 11, 2008
Two foreigners try to make sense of life in the United States in the aftermath of two very different wars. A young Iraqi ends up in America after fleeing Iraq and goes on a road trip full of questions for Americans about the War. And a Bulgarian man in Rhode Island realizes that an ongoing argument with his American wife has to do with the life he left behind 20 years ago, on the other side of the Iron Curtain.
9	"Going Down in History"	May 18, 2008
Stories of people trying to make, and remake, history, while others go down in history in ways they never intended. Two Wisconsin convicts gain local fame for almost escaping prison using dental floss. High school students pose for smiley yearbook snapshots, which capture nothing of the dramas in their lives. A man creates his own World War II inspired safe-haven after an attack left him brain damaged. And a man with a 30-year obsession with one particular bird unveils the grainy, Bigfoot-style video evidence that he saw it.
10	"Underdogs"	May 25, 2008
There's a whole world of boxing way down the food chain from championship fights, and the stakes are high even without media hype and massive cash prizes. Two boxers in Tennessee who've known each other all their lives face off in a match that neither can afford to lose.
11	"Every Marriage Is a Courtroom"	June 1, 2008
Cartoonist Chris Ware animates a true story that demonstrates that every marriage–even the happiest–is a courtroom. But most of the episode is devoted to the slow-motion disintegration of one couple's marriage. The husband's obsession with a legal battle forces the most basic marital questions into the open: what do I need? And what can I put up with?
12	"John Smith"	June 8, 2008
The story of one life, told through the lives of people from all over the country, all named John Smith. Baby John Smith is 11 weeks old, in South Carolina, and his parents are still reeling from the sonograms that predicted he would be a girl. By the time he's 23, John Smith in Laramie, Wyoming, has made some mistakes and is appearing in front of a judge. At 46, he's in Texas, welcoming his oldest son back from Iraq. In-depth portraits of people growing up, growing old, and figuring out how to be fathers, husbands, and men in America today.
13	"No Respect"	May 28, 2009
This episode examines comedians and their audiences. It includes segments about performing for a rowdy crowd, and a piece about Mike Birbiglia's worst gig ever.

== Reception ==
=== Critical reviews ===
Season one was well received. Giving the program four stars, People magazine said the series has an "offbeat sensibility and a reflective, compassionate intelligence," and said that the hosts "overarticulate the ironies instead of just letting you watch. Which you should do. Watch." Entertainment Weekly gave the show a B+, saying "handsomely produced experimental series ought to please flexible fans—as well as so many more who are new to the notion of an artful grab-bag documentary series about real people describing little realities." Commenting on where the program fell in "quirk" culture, Michael Hirschorn of the Atlantic said "the rhythms [of the show] are lulling, and everyone involved appears to be—is—smart, idiosyncratic, charmingly self-effacing, well-meaning," but added that "radio listeners can't really fight through Glass's scrim, so they have to take his word that the story is what he says it is. In the harsh light of television, however, the affectations of the radio show become glaringly clear."

Season two continued to get good reviews. Entertainment Weekly again gave the program a B+, saying, "Purists can rest easy, as the televised version continues to lose nothing in translation." People calls it a "superb series." The A.V. Club named the episode "John Smith" one of the top ten episodes of the decade, saying, "it successfully blends the atmosphere of the radio series with the approach of a top-notch documentary to create one of the most moving non-fiction films of the decade...It’s the kind of riveting television that you stumble upon at 1 a.m. in a motel room and can’t switch off.

=== Awards and nominations ===
In 2007, the series won two Primetime Emmy Awards: Outstanding Nonfiction Series and Outstanding Directing for Nonfiction Programming. It was also nominated for Outstanding Cinematography for Nonfiction Programming, Outstanding Writing for Nonfiction Programming and Outstanding Editing for Nonfiction Programming.

In 2008, the series was nominated for three Primetime Emmy Awards: Outstanding Cinematography for Nonfiction Programming, Outstanding Directing for Nonfiction Programming, and Outstanding Writing for Nonfiction Programming.

== Home releases ==
Season one of the series was released on DVD exclusively to Borders bookstores in January 29, 2008. On May 19, 2008, Showtime announced the release would "go wide" to other retailers on September 23, 2008.

Season two was released on DVD to Borders on January 20, 2009. The set was given a wide release on July 17, 2009.
