= List of 2005 This American Life episodes =

In 2005, there were 26 This American Life episodes.

- Episode 280 – "In Country"
  - Show description: On the experiences of United States National Guard reservists and Marines in post-invasion Iraq
  - Act 1: When Weekend Warriors Work on Weekdays – Ira Glass
  - Act 2: Marine Life – Jack Hitt
- Episode 281 – "My Big Break"
  - Show description: On personal struggles leading to unexpected success or failure
  - Act 1: Take My Break, Please – David Segal
  - Act 2: What Happens in Baghdad, Stays in Baghdad – Jen Banbury
  - Act 3: Oedipus Hex – Shalom Auslander
- Episode 282 – "DIY"
  - Show description: An entire episode of a story about the wrongful murder conviction of Collin Warner. After 21 years in prison, Warner's friends managed to prove Warner's innocence and free him from jail.
  - Act 1: Untitled – Anya Bourg
  - Act 2: The story of Collin Warner continues
- Episode 283 – "Remember Me"
  - Act 1: Thinking inside the box – David Wilcox
  - Act 2: Where's Walter? – Starlee Kine
  - Act 3: Giving up the ghosts – Shalom Auslander
- Episode 284 – "Should I Stay Or Should I Go?"
  - Act 1: The Karachi kid
  - Act 2: Not far from the tree – Amy O'Leary
  - Act 3: Because I'm the mommy, that's why
- Episode 285 – "Know Your Enemy"
  - Act 1: The Minister Meets the Martyr
  - Act 2: I Am Curious, Jello – David Segal
  - Act 3: Eight Percent of Nothing – Etgar Keret
- Episode 286 – "Mind Games"
  - Act 1: Untitled – Ira Glass
  - Act 2: The Spy Who Loved Everyone – Jorge Just
  - Act 3: Invisible Girl – Scott Carrier
- Episode 287 – "Backed Into a Corner"
  - Act 1: Working Class Hero Sandwich – Shirleen Holt
  - Act 2: Don't Drive Like My Brother – Jonathan Menjivar
  - Act 3: Confessions of a Not-So-Dangerous Mind – Brian Montopoli
- Episode 288 – "Not What I Meant"
  - Act 1: Froggy Goes A-Courtin' – Gabrielle Galanek
  - Act 2: Cat Got Your Tongue – David Sedaris
  - Act 3: Romance Languages – Ben Karlin
- Episode 289 – "Go Ask Your Father"
  - Act 1: Make Him Say Uncle – Ira Glass
  - Act 2: My Favorite Martian – Paul Tough
- Episode 290 – "Godless America"
  - Act 1: The Substance of Things Hoped For
  - Act 2: God Said, Huh? – Julia Sweeney
- Episode 291 – "Reunited (and It Feels So Good)"
  - Act 1: Not Your Parents' Parent Trap – Nazanin Rafsanjani
  - Act 2: If By Chance We Meet Again – Ira Glass
  - Act 3: French Kiss – Sarah Vowell
- Episode 292 – "The Arms Trader"
  - Prologue – Ira Glass on the Lackawanna 6
  - Act 1: Petra Bartosiewicz on the arrest and conviction of Hemant Lakhani
  - Act 2: continuation of Act 1
- Episode 293 – "A Little Bit of Knowledge"
  - Prologue: Ira Glass and Nancy Updike
  - Act 1: Small Thoughts in Big Brains – Alex Blumberg
  - Act 2: And Daddy Makes Three – Dan Savage
  - Act 3: Sucker MC-Square – Robert Andrew Powell
  - Act 4: The Art of Adult Conversation – Alexa Junge
- Episode 294 – "Image Makers"
  - Act 1: Dewey Decibel System – Alex Blumberg
  - Act 2: Goldstein on Goldstein – Jonathan Goldstein
  - Act 3: Hearth Shaped Box – Julie Hill
- Episode 295 – "Not What I Signed Up For"
  - Act 1: The Double Whammy – Ira Glass
  - Act 2: Small Fish, Smaller Pond – Nick Hornby
- Episode 296 – "After the Flood"
  - Show description: Stories from survivors of Hurricane Katrina.
  - Prologue: Ira Glass interviews William Nichelson about the role of state and federal authorities
  - Act 1: Middle of Somewhere – Ira Glass interviews Denise Moore, a hurricane survivor
  - Music interlude: Memphis Minnie, When the Levee Breaks
  - Act 2: Forgotten, But Not Lost – Alex Blumberg interviews Lorrie Beth Slonsky and Debbie Zelinsky about an occurrence at the Pontchartrain Expressway bridge
  - Music interlude: Fats Domino, "Walking to New Orleans"
  - Act 3: Social Studies Lesson – Alex Blumberg interviews Ashley Nelson
  - Ray Charles, Them That Got
  - Act 4: Diaspora – Cheryl Wagner
  - Act 5: Displaced Persons Camp – Lisa Pollak interviews survivors of Hurricane Charley in Florida
- Episode 297 – "This Is Not My Beautiful House"
  - Show description: Stories from the Houston Astrodome and New Orleans about survivors of Hurricane Katrina.
  - Act 1: Let it Snow, Let it Snow, Let it Snow – Jane Feltes
  - Act 2: No Place Like Dome – Ira Glass
  - Act 3: Land Grab – Lisa Pollak
  - Act 4: The Long Way Home – Nick Spitzer
  - Act 5: Water Bed – Alex Kotlowitz
- Episode 298 – "Getting and Spending"
  - Act 1: Mothers of Invention – Alex Kotlowitz and Amy Drozdowska-McGuire
  - Act 2: That Guy – Diane Cook
  - Act 3: Mall Rat – John Hodgman
- Episode 299 – "Back From The Dead"
  - Act 1: In the Event of An Emergency – Ira Glass
  - Act 2: 'P' Is For Porta-Potty – Sarah Koenig
  - Act 3: Friday Night Floodlights – Lisa Pollak
- Episode 300 – "What's in a Number?"
  - Act 1: Truth, Damn Truth, and Statistics – Alex Blumberg
  - Act 2: Not Just a Number – Ryan Gist
  - Act 3: What do we do with these numbers anyway? – Ira Glass
- Episode 301 – "Settling the Score"
  - Air date: November 11, 2005
  - Prologue – Ira Glass
  - Act 1: One Good Deed – Erin Einhorn
  - Act 2: The Things That Money Can Buy – Beau O'Reilly
- Episode 302 – "Strangers in a Strange Land"
  - Air date: November 18, 2005
  - Prologue – Ira Glass
  - Act 1: Not Just Tourists, Tourists Who Care – Chris Tenove
  - Act 2: Johnny Get Your Mouse – Amy O'Leary
- Episode 303 – "David and Goliath"
  - Act 1: Lab Rugrats – Ira Glass
  - Act 2: Dreams of Distant Factories – Rachel Louise Snyder
  - Act 3: Adventures at Poo Corner – David Sedaris
- Episode 304 – "Heretics"
  - Act 1: Rise – Russell Cobb
  - Act 2: Fall
- Episode 305 – "The "This American Life" Holiday Spectacular"
  - Act 1: Twas the Morning After – David Rakoff
  - Act 2: No Tenenbaum, No Tenenbaum – John Hodgman
  - Act 3: My So-Called Jesus – Heather O'Neill
  - Act 4: An Animal Farm Christmas – David Sedaris
  - Act 5: Christmas at Valley Forge – Sarah Vowell
  - Act 6: What Would Joseph Do? – Jonathan Goldstein
