= Human Rights First =

US-based non-profit organization

- Formation: 1978
- Headquarters: New York, New York
- President/CEO: Uzra Zeya (human rights policy expert)
- Website: humanrightsfirst.org

Human Rights First (formerly known as the Lawyers Committee for International Human Rights) is a nonpartisan, 501(c)(3), international human rights organization based in New York City, Los Angeles and Washington, D.C. The organization was renamed the Lawyers Committee for International Human Rights in 1986 and, in May 2004, changed its name again to Human Rights First. Its work centers on four main issue areas: authoritarianism, extremism, systemic injustice and the abuse of technology. It closely works with lawyers, veterans and security experts, technologists, and allied advocates to further its policy agenda. In 2004, it launched an "End Torture Now" campaign. The organization also runs the Fighting Discrimination program which focuses on hate crimes.

In January 2026, it became known that the organization had been declared an undesirable in Russia.

== Board of directors ==
Human Rights First is governed by a board of directors composed of 92 members, including a 30-person Board of Advocates and a 13-person Emeritus Board.

Members of the board include:

- Jay Carney, Global Head of Policy and Communications at Airbnb
- Sarah Cleveland, Professor of Human and Constitutional Rights Columbia University Law School
- Ben Jealous, Executive Director of the Sierra Club
- Kerry Kennedy, President of RFK Human Rights
- Robert A. Mandell, former Ambassador to Luxembourg; Chairman and CEO of Greater Properties, Inc. (Ret.)
- Carlos Pascual, Senior Vice President at IHS Markit
- Nazanin Rafsanjani, former head of New Show Development at Gimlet Media and Spotify
- Mona Sutphen, Senior Advisor at The Vistria Group

== Selected publications ==
- The War Against Children: South Africa's Youngest Victims, Desmond Tutu, 1986. ISBN 9780934143004.
- Vigilantes in the Philippines: A Threat to Democratic Rule, Diane Orentlicher, 1988. ISBN 9780934143035.
- Refuge Denied: Problems in the Protection of Vietnamese and Cambodians in Thailand and the Admission of Indochinese Refugees into the United States, Albert Santoli, 1989. ISBN 9780934143202.
- Paper Laws, Steel Bayonets: Breakdown of the Rule of Law in Haiti, Elliot Schrage, 1990. ISBN 9780934143387
- Childhood Abducted: Children Cutting Sugar Cane in the Dominican Republic, Theresa A. Amato, 1991. ISBN 9780934143424.
