= Alex, Inc. =

American sitcom

- Genre: Sitcom
- Created by: Matt Tarses
- Based on: StartUp by Gimlet Media, Inc.
- Starring: Zach Braff; Tiya Sircar; Hillary Anne Matthews; Elisha Henig; Audyssie James; Michael Imperioli
- Composers: Rob Simonsen; Duncan Blickenstaff
- Country of origin: United States
- Original language: English
- No. of seasons: 1
- No. of episodes: 10

Production
- Executive producers: Matt Tarses; Zach Braff; John Davis; John Fox; Alex Blumberg; Chris Giliberti; Matt Lieber
- Producers: Patrick Kienlen; Paul O'Toole; Andy St. Clair
- Cinematography: Eric Edwards
- Camera setup: Single-camera
- Running time: 21–22 minutes
- Production companies: Davis Entertainment; Two Soups Productions; ABC Studios; Sony Pictures Television

Original release
- Network: ABC
- Release: March 28 – May 16, 2018

Alex, Inc. is an American sitcom created by Matt Tarses that aired on ABC from March 28 to May 16, 2018. Based on Gimlet Media, Inc.'s StartUp, the series stars Zach Braff, Tiya Sircar, Hillary Anne Matthews, Elisha Henig, Audyssie James and Michael Imperioli. The series was produced by Davis Entertainment, Two Soups Productions, ABC Studios and Sony Pictures Television.

== Premise ==
The series follows Alex Schuman, a radio journalist, husband, and father of two, who decides to quit his job and start his own company.

== Cast and characters ==
=== Main ===
- Zach Braff as Alex Schuman, a radio journalist, Rooni's husband, and father of Ben and Soraya, who has left his old job to start his own podcast company
- Tiya Sircar as Arunima “Rooni” Schuman, a lawyer, Alex's wife, and mother of Ben and Soraya
- Hillary Anne Matthews as Deirdre, a producer at Alex's old job who left with him for his new company
- Elisha Henig as Ben Schuman, Alex and Rooni's son
- Audyssie James as Soraya Schuman, Alex and Rooni's daughter
- Michael Imperioli as Eddie, Alex's cousin and an investor in the new company

=== Notable guest stars ===
- Natalie Morales as Serena Bans (episode: "The Rube Goldberg Contraption")

== Production ==
=== Development ===
On August 29, 2016, it was announced that ABC had ordered Start Up, a single-camera comedy television series, as a put pilot. Matt Tarses, Zach Braff, John Davis, John Fox, Chris Giliberti, Alex Blumberg, and Matt Lieber serve as executive producers. Zach Braff also serves as director. The series is a production of Davis Entertainment and is based on the podcast StartUp. On January 25, 2017, it was announced that a pilot for the series was officially picked up. On May 11, 2017, it was announced that the series was officially picked up. The series is further a production of Sony Pictures Television and ABC Studios. On May 16, 2017, it was announced that the series was renamed to Alex, Inc. On January 8, 2018, it was announced that the series would premiere on March 28, 2018. On May 9, 2018, it was announced that the series was canceled after one season.

=== Casting ===
On August 29, 2016, it was announced that Zach Braff was cast in the series. On February 15, 2017, it was announced that Tiya Sircar was cast in the series. On March 8, 2017, it was announced that Michael Imperioli was cast in the series. On March 14, 2017, it was announced that Hillary Anne Matthews was cast in the series. On March 22, 2017, it was announced that Chris Sacca would play himself in the series. On May 11, 2017, it was announced that Elisha Henig and Audyssie James were cast in the series. On February 8, 2018, it was announced that Sophia Bush would guest star in the series.

== Episodes ==
No.	Title	Directed by	Written by	Original release date	Prod. code	U.S. viewers (millions)
1	"The Unfair Advantage"	Zach Braff	Matt Tarses	March 28, 2018	100	4.60
Radio journalist Alex Schuman has tired of only being allowed to do feel-good stories, so he quits his job and decides to instead create his own podcast through which he believes he can change the world. The sudden death of his intended first interviewee (a supposedly wrongly convicted murderer) and continuous problems with financing make Alex drop the project, but Ben's magic show makes Alex change his mind, and he successfully pitches an idea to Chris Sacca: a podcast about Alex and his family's everyday lives. Guest stars: Chris Sacca as himself, Austin Pendleton as Wesley Harman, Ashleigh Murray as Melissa
2	"The Wax Museum"	Zach Braff	Matt Tarses	April 4, 2018	101	3.73
Alex has barely begun working on his podcast, but is already feeling the pressure of trying to juggle his private life and work. Meanwhile, Deirdre and Eddie are arguing and eventually sabotage each other by scheduling two important meetings at the same time; both of which Alex has to attend. All of this makes Alex doubt himself, but Ben's wax museum project makes Alex change his mind, and he successfully convinces advertisers and a major interview subject to support his podcast. Guest star: Morgan Krantz as Jack Miller
3	"The Butterfly Pavilion"	Richie Keen	Vanessa McCarthy	April 11, 2018	103	3.53
Eddie ignores a decision by Alex and installs a recording booth at the office. Alex feels his authority is being undermined by this (and Eddie's behaviour in general), and the two have an altercation which quickly turns physical. Meanwhile, Rooni chaperones Soraya's school trip to the Butterfly Pavilion, where Rooni accidentally commits a murder. Guest stars: Kelly Perine as Marion, Candice Azzara as Aunt Louise, Jill Johnson as Teacher
4	"The Nanny"	Alisa Statman	Juliet Seniff	April 17, 2018	106	4.85
With Alex having started his own company and also having to hire an assistant, he and Rooni need to cut down on expenses. As a result, they fire their beloved babysitter Rosalba and instead hire Ben to look after Soraya; a job Ben proves utterly incapable of doing. Due to a misunderstanding, Rosalba believes she instead has gotten the assistant job; a job she proves utterly incapable of doing. Guest stars: Robert Clendenin as Dave Felix, Philip Anthony-Rodriguez as Nelsen Munoz
5	"The Mother-in-Law"	Michael Patrick Jann	Dan Rubin	April 18, 2018	102	2.76
Alex struggles to name his company while also having to deal with his judgmental mother-in-law Joya. He eventually gives up and hires a branding agency to name the company. But after Joya tell him about her childhood experience of being sent to the market alone for the first time and overcoming her fear of "ajana," the unknown, Alex decides to name the company Ajana. Guest stars: Anjali Bhimani as Joya, John Patrick Jordan as Harley, Courtney Richards as Emile
6	"The Cop Car"	Zach Braff	Andy St. Clair & Paul O'Toole	April 25, 2018	104	2.94
To promote his podcast Our Family's Business, Alex goes on the raunchy Vanessa Stanhope Show where he is baited into revealing he had sex with Rooni on their first date. Rooni gets angry but when Alex eventually apologizes to her, she reveals her anger stems from Alex paying attention only to his company and not to his family. Meanwhile, Deirdre's former employer offers her a job, and Ben realizes his bandmate has a crush on him. Guest star: Sophia Bush as Vanessa Stanhope
7	"The Grande Apologano"	Zach Braff	Lisa McQuillan	April 25, 2018	107	2.49
Alex's company Ajana is looking for potential podcasts to produce, but none of the pitches they receive seem quite right. After Rooni makes a great teaser for a true-crime podcast, Alex decides to produce the podcast but cut her out of the process since he finds her too controlling in work situations. This leads to a row between the two, making Alex leave the project and the inexperienced Rooni take over. Meanwhile, Ben's relationship with Emily is getting crowded by her friend Lauren, and Deirdre goes out on a date with a prospective podcaster. Guest stars: Matt Walsh as Detective Phipps, Joel Kelley Dauten as Jeremy
8	"The Internet Trolls"	Phil Traill	Joshua Corey & Brian Kratz	May 2, 2018	105	3.06
Rooni and Ben work hard on Soraya's diorama for school, but only get a B. Meanwhile, Ajana's teaser for their Our Family's Business podcast is met by a barrage of trolling, deeply hurting Alex's feelings and making him worry he will let down his family and employees. He decides to stay home, rather than go to the launch party, but a talk with Rooni makes Alex change his mind and attend the party.
9	"The Fever"	Chris Koch	Morgan Beck & Dan Rubin	May 9, 2018	108	3.03
Alex has put an expensive focus group on Ajana's new podcast, but Deirdre accidentally deletes all the feedback. To avoid Alex finding out, she creates her own, free focus group to get new data. Meanwhile, Alex's mother-in-law is visiting. Alex worries she is badmouthing him whenever she talks in Bengali, so he downloads a translating app which accidentally reveals a big secret. In addition, Alex discovers Soraya is pretending to be sick for reasons she won't reveal. Guest star: Anjali Bhimani as Joya
10	"The Rube Goldberg Contraption"	John Putch	Joshua Corey & Brian Kratz	May 16, 2018	109	3.24
Our Family's Business unexpectedly becomes the most downloaded podcast in the US, so main investor Chris Sacca wants Ajana to create five new podcasts with the help of famous podcast producer Serena Bans. This in turn leads to conflict within the office. Meanwhile, Alex worries he and Ben are drifting apart and tries to rectify that by making a live podcast about Ben. Special guest star: Natalie Morales as Serena Bans Guest stars: Sam Lloyd as Dr. Gibbs, Dean Cameron as Bruce

== Reception ==
=== Critical ===
On the review aggregator website Rotten Tomatoes, the series has an approval rating of 40% based on 15 reviews, with an average rating of 4.46/10. The site's critics consensus reads, "By failing to establish the credibility of its lead, Alex, Inc loses sight an appealing premise and strands a likable Zach Braff in a sea of wasted potential." Metacritic, which uses a weighted average, assigned a score of 49 out of 100 based on 10 critics, indicating "mixed or average reviews".

=== Ratings ===
==== Season 1 ====
Viewership and ratings per episode of Alex, Inc.
No.	Title	Air date	Rating/share (18–49)	Viewers (millions)
1	"The Unfair Advantage"	March 28, 2018	1.1/4	4.60
2	"The Wax Museum"	April 4, 2018	0.9/4	3.73
3	"The Butterfly Pavilion"	April 11, 2018	0.9/4	3.53
4	"The Nanny"	April 17, 2018	1.3/5	4.85
5	"The Mother-in-Law"	April 18, 2018	0.6/3	2.76
6	"The Cop Car"	April 25, 2018	0.7/3	2.94
7	"The Grande Apologano"	April 25, 2018	0.6/3	2.49
8	"The Internet Trolls"	May 2, 2018	0.8/4	3.06
9	"The Fever"	May 9, 2018	0.7/3	3.03
10	"The Rube Goldberg Contraption"	May 16, 2018	0.8/3	3.24

==== Overall ====
Viewership and ratings per season of Alex, Inc.
Season	Episodes	First aired		Last aired		Avg. viewers (millions)
Season	Episodes	Date	Viewers (millions)	Date	Viewers (millions)	Avg. viewers (millions)
1	10	March 28, 2018	4.60	May 16, 2018	3.24	3.42
