= Science Vs =

Science podcast

- Genre: Science
- Format: Single Topic, Scientist Interviews
- Language: English

Creative team
- Created by: Wendy Zukerman

Cast and voices
- Hosted by: Wendy Zukerman
- Narrated by: Wendy Zukerman

Music
- Composed by: Bumi Hidaka, Peter Leonard, Marcus Bagala, Emma Munger, Bobby Lord

Production
- Direction: Blythe Terrell
- Production: Nick DelRose, Peter Leonard, Rose Rimler, Emma Munger, Meryl Horn, Michelle Dang, Taylor White
- Length: 30–50 minutes

Publication
- No. of seasons: 10
- No. of episodes: 346
- Original release: 2015
- Provider: Spotify
- Updates: Periodic

Reception
- Ratings: 4.4/5

Science Vs is a science podcast created and hosted by Wendy Zukerman. The show takes a myth-busting approach to controversial topics and current events, with fact checking and research of the scientific literature, as well as interviewing relevant experts. A typical show will have over a hundred citations and involve background interviews of dozens of scientists in addition to the scientists who speak on the show.

== History ==
The show was first produced and distributed in 2015 by the Australian Broadcasting Corporation (ABC) as part of ABC Radio's First Run podcast program. Science Vs was picked up by Gimlet Media, a Brooklyn-based digital media company. Originally, Zukerman had to do all the research herself, but under Gimlet she was able to hire a dedicated research team. Episode topics have included immigration, gun control, ghosts, climate change, acne, and antidepressants, among others. Zukerman has said that the idea for Science Vs came from news headlines about Gwyneth Paltrow wanting women to participate in a "health practice" of vaginal steaming, which she thought could combine science with humor. Zukerman summarized her podcast's position against false equivalences, saying, "If there's a 95 percent consensus among scientists, you report the consensus."

In 2019 the show, along with other Gimlet Podcasts, was acquired by Spotify.

In February 2022 Zukerman announced that in response to COVID-19 misinformation spread by The Joe Rogan Experience, another Spotify podcast, Science Vs would suspend regular programming and air only shows that fact-check other Spotify podcasts. Zukerman called the platform's support of Rogan's COVID-19 misinformation "a slap in the face" in an email to Spotify CEO Daniel Ek. The February 25, 2022 episode of the podcast was devoted to refuting claims about the COVID-19 vaccine made on an episode of Rogan's podcast by virologist Robert Malone.

== Reception ==
The show was a 2020 nominee for a Podcast Award, and the host Wendy Zukerman is a nominee for a 2021 Podcast Academy "Ambie" Best Host Award.

It was Spotify's #1 Science podcast in the US and #20 overall.

== See also ==
- List of health and wellness podcasts
