= Arlan Hamilton =

American investment fund founder

- Born: October 30, 1980 (age 45)
- Occupations: Founder and managing partner, Backstage Capital

Arlan Hamilton (born 1980) is an American Venture capitalist, investor, author, and entrepreneur. She is the founder and managing partner of Backstage capital, a venture capital firm established in 2015 that invests in startups led by founders who are traditionally underrepresented in the technology industry.

Hamilton is the author of It's About Damn Time: How to Turn Being Underestimated into Your Greatest Advantage (2020), a memoir and career guide chronicling her path to founding a venture capital firm.

== Career ==
Prior to her venture capital role, Hamilton founded and published the indie magazine Interlude and prior to that, served as tour manager to Atlantic Records recording artist Janine.

In May 2018, Hamilton announced her firm would also attempt to raise a $36 million fund specifically for black female founders.

Hamilton was the subject of a six-episode series on the Gimlet Media podcast Startup. Hamilton is mostly complimentary about the podcast series, but did take issue with how she was portrayed, especially in sequences that cast her in an irresponsible light. Hamilton's Backstage Capital's podcast The Bootstrapped VC features episodes that are reactions to the Gimlet series.

In June 2019, Hamilton received recognition from Business Insider as one of the 23 most powerful LGBTQ+ people in tech.

In June 2022, TechCrunch reported that BackStage Capital had laid off most of its staff and was pausing net new investments.

In March 2024, Hamilton was announced as a strategic advisor for the Inpink platform by Gritty in Pink alongside Melissa Etheridge and Live Nation.

Hamilton has funded a scholarship for black female pilots, and a scholarship for black students at the University of Oxford.

== Personal life ==
In 2019, Hamilton married German composer and actress, Anna Eichenauer.

In 2021, Hamilton paid $112,500 for a 1956 Chevy truck owned by her personal icon Janet Jackson.

== Writing ==
Before becoming a venture capitalist, Hamilton gained notoriety as a blogger on "Your Daily Lesbian Moment," a blog site and point of connection for women seeking both platonic and romantic relationships with other women.

In May 2020, Hamilton published the book entitled, "It's About Damn Time," written with Rachel L. Nelson. The book is part memoir and part how-to for people who are generally underestimated in society. In the book, Hamilton details her early career as a music tour producer and, on pivoting to venture capital, the tactics she used to start the VC fund Backstage Capital.

- It's About Damn Time. Penguin Random House. 2020. ISBN 9780593136416.
- Your First Million: Why You Don’t Have to Be Born into a Legacy of Wealth to Leave One Behind. Little, Brown Spark. 2024. ISBN 9780316507967.

== Awards ==
- 2018 – Fortune 40 Under 40
- 2021 — Fast Company Queer 50
- 2022 — Fast Company Queer 50
