= Wendy Zukerman =

Australian-American podcaster and science journalist

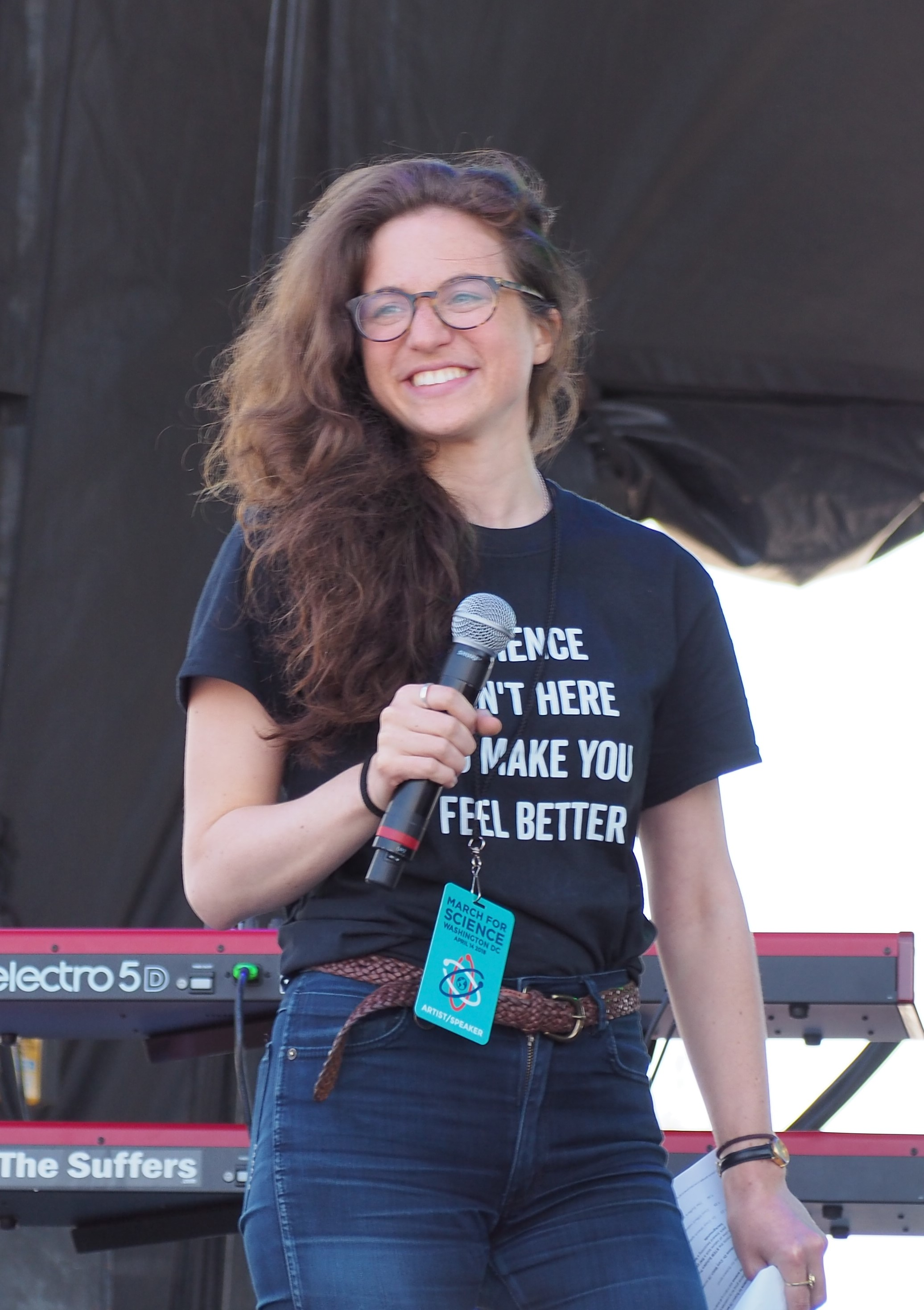
- At the March for Science 2018 in Washington, D.C.
- Occupation: Science journalist
- Notable work: Science Vs
- Relatives: Ashley Zukerman (brother)

Wendy Zukerman is an Australian science journalist and podcaster. She is best known as the host of Science Vs, a program that dissects areas of scientific controversy and public confusion. She is the sister of Australian actor Ashley Zukerman.

== Early life and education ==
Wendy Zukerman was born in the United States but raised in Melbourne, Australia. She attended Monash University and received a biomedical science and law degree.

== Career ==
Zukerman worked for the Australian Broadcasting Corporation (ABC) on the documentary television program Catalyst and the consumer affairs television program The Checkout.

She has also written for many different publications, including New Scientist, Cosmos, The Age, The Australian, and Saturday Paper.

In 2014 and 2015, she spoke at Storyology, an annual festival of journalism and media. In March 2018, she spoke at a SXSW panel event called, "What Podcasts Ate for Dinner".

=== Science Vs ===
Zukerman's podcast Science Vs was initially produced and distributed by the Australian Broadcasting Corporation as part of ABC Radio's First Run podcast program. In October 2015, Gimlet Media, an American digital media company based in Brooklyn, New York, took over the production of the podcast.

Science Vs focuses on communicating science to non-scientists. The show takes a myth-busting approach, and topics on the show generally come from controversial topics or current events. Episode topics have included immigration, gun control, ghosts, climate change, acne, and antidepressants, among others. Zukerman has said that the idea for Science Vs came from news headlines about Gwyneth Paltrow wanting women to participate in a "health practice" of vaginal steaming, which she thought could present in a way that combined science with humour. Zukerman summarised her podcast's position against false equivalences, saying, "If there's a 95 percent consensus among scientists, you report the consensus."

== Recognition ==
In 2021, Zukerman was amongst the first nominees of the Podcast Academy's new "Ambie" awards. She was one of seven nominees for the Best Host award.

== Personal life ==
Her brother is actor Ashley Zukerman, and they have another sister, Debbie. As of 2016 Zukerman was living in New York City.
