= Elisha Henig =

American actor

- Occupation: Actor
- Years active: 2015–present

Elisha Henig is an American actor.

== Personal life and career ==
Elisha Henig grew up in Portland, Oregon, and became interested in acting after taking a Shakespeare class at the age of eight. He began acting in guest roles in various TV productions at the age of 10, such as Grey's Anatomy, Adam Ruins Everything and Mr. Robot. Henig was a main cast member playing the protagonist role of Julian in the second season of the USA Network drama The Sinner, and alongside Zach Braff in Alex, Inc. Other roles include Miles in Season 2 of American Vandal, young Ramy Youssef in an episode of Ramy that dealt with growing up during 9/11 and garnered media attention. In 2020, he played the role of Pootie-Shoe, a video game streamer, in Mythic Quest. He played Levi in the Duplass brothers produced cringe comedy The Drop (2022). In 2025, he wrote the screenplay for the standalone episode of Mythic Quest's final season, reprising Pootie-Shoe opposite special guest star Charlie Day. Also in 2025, he released his debut EP of music MaryAnne and Clockface kill time in the san fernando valley under the artist name Situationist. Henig is Jewish and had his bar mitzvah in early 2018.

== Filmography ==
Year	Title	Role	Notes
2015	Leo & Clark	Leo	Short film
2015	Nicky, Ricky, Dicky & Dawn	Lucas	2 episodes
2015	CSI: Cyber	Timmy Martola	1 episode
2015	Grey's Anatomy	Kamal	1 episode
2016	Code Black	Luke Barton	1 episode
2016	Game Shakers	Lance	1 episode
2016	Colony	Harris	1 episode
2016	Rizzoli and Isles	Jared Daniels	1 episode
2016	Legendary Dudas	Payton Bolas	1 episode
2016	Lab Rats: Elite Force	AJ	2 episodes
2016	School of Rock	Holden	1 episode
2016	The Librarians	Vern	1 episode
2016	Transparent	Young Simon	1 episode
2017	Adam Ruins Everything	Stuart	1 episode
2017	Mr. Robot	Mohammed	1 episode
2018	MacGyver	Ethan Jerico	1 episode
2018	Alex, Inc.	Ben Schuman	Series regular
2018	American Vandal	Myles Crimmins	5 episodes
2018	The Sinner	Julian Walker	Lead role, season 2
2018	Future World	Grandson	
2019	Ramy	Young Ramy	1 episode
2019	Cipher	Kyle	1 episode
2021	Just Beyond	Graham	1 episode
2022	The Drop	Levi	co-lead
2020; 2025	Mythic Quest	Brendan / Pootie_Shoe	7 episodes
