= Ali on the Run =

Fitness podcast

Ali on the Run is a fitness podcast hosted by race announcer, blogger and former journalist Ali Feller. Over the podcast's more than five hundred episodes, Feller's subjects have ranged from everyday runners to Olympic marathoners, and she talks about issues that face the entire running community. The podcast is amongst the top running podcasts and is ranked as the #1 running podcast by Chartable. Feller lives in New Hampshire, but began her podcast in 2017 while living in New Jersey, following a career writing for a number of fitness and dance publications.

== Host ==
Ali Feller (b. 1985) was raised in Hopkinton, New Hampshire and began running when she was living in New York City after college and couldn't afford a gym membership. She is an announcer for New Hampshire-based Millennium Running and has announced for World Marathon Major races, including the New York City Marathon and Boston Marathon. Ali was married to entrepreneur Brian Cristiano until 2024 and together they had a daughter, Annie.

In 2023, Feller was diagnosed with breast cancer and on June 6, 2025, she announced a recurrence that had spread to her bones.

== See also ==
- List of health and wellness podcasts
