= Emmanuel Dzotsi =

English American radio journalist

Emmanuel Dzotsi (born in 1993) is an English American radio journalist. He was a co-host of the podcasts Serial and Reply All.

== Early life and education ==
Dzotsi was born in Streatham, London. His parents' families immigrated to the United Kingdom from Dominica and Ghana. His family moved several times because of his father's work, and he lived in Shropshire and Belgium before emigrating to the United States, where they settled in Toledo, Ohio in 2005.

He attended The Ohio State University, where he studied political science and strategic communications. In college, Dzotsi produced a feature-length film, played mellophone in the Ohio State University Marching Band and delivered a TEDx Talk about storytelling. He graduated in 2015.

== Career ==
Dzotsi moved to Chicago after graduating from Ohio State, interning for WBEZ before becoming a fellow at This American Life.

In 2018, he hosted the third season of Serial alongside Sarah Koenig. Unlike previous seasons, which focused on single cases, it told multiple people's stories as told from the Justice Center in Cleveland, where Dzotsi lived for eight months to report the series.

In October 2020, Dzotsi became a co-host of Reply All alongside Alex Goldman and PJ Vogt. The show went on hiatus in February 2021 after controversy erupted over "The Test Kitchen," a limited series about the workplace culture at Bon Appétit, as well as wider issues around Gimlet Media's acquisition by Spotify. Vogt resigned shortly afterward. In a June 2021 episode relaunching Reply All, Dzotsi commented that "we don't know if it's going to work."

In June 2022, Dzotsi and Goldman left Reply All, coinciding with the end of the show. Dzotsi has continued to contribute to This American Life.
