= Surprisingly Awesome =

American comedy podcast

Presentation
- Hosted by: Adam Davidson, Adam McKay, and Rachel Ward
- Genre: Humor, Human Interest
- Updates: Occasionally

Publication
- Original release: November 3, 2015 – January 19, 2017
- Provider: Gimlet Media

Related
- Website: Official website

Surprisingly Awesome was an American podcast formerly hosted by Adam Davidson and Adam McKay and subsequently hosted by Rachel Ward and frequently guest hosted by John Hodgman. In each episode, one of the hosts would take a seemingly boring topic, and try to make the other believe that it is interesting. These topics have varied from mold to interest rates. The podcast was hosted by Gimlet Media.

The idea for the podcast came from the friendship that developed when McKay and Davidson worked together on The Big Short. McKay and Davidson would have long conversations when they would try to "out-fascinate" each other and make dull subjects seem interesting.

After searching for a new host for the show, Gimlet chose former Science Friday correspondent Flora Lichtman to take over, but decided to rebrand the show under a new name. On April 12, 2017, Gimlet CEO Alex Blumberg announced that Surprisingly Awesome was cancelled and would be replaced by Lichtman's new show, Every Little Thing.

== Episodes ==
Episode #	Title	Description	Original Release Date
1	Mold	Adam Davidson tries to convince his co-host that mold is awesome.	November 3, 2015
2	Free Throws	Adam McKay tries to make free throws interesting	November 5, 2015
3	Concrete	The two try to drum up interest in concrete Guest: La La Anthony	November 17, 2015
4	Tubthumping	They dig deeper into the 1990s hit "Tubthumping"	December 1, 2015
5	Interest Rates	The hosts try to convince Adam McKay's daughter that interest rates are awesome	December 15, 2015
6	Broccoli	Adam and Rachel investigate the many forms of broccoli	January 12, 2016
7	Adhesive	Adam and Rachel investigate perfect adhesive, including a look at gecko feet	January 26, 2016
8	Frequent Flyer Miles	Guest host John Hodgman discusses frequent flyer miles.	March 8, 2016
9	Pigeons	Topic: Pigeons	March 22, 2016
10	Circle of Fifths	Topic: Circle of fifths	April 5, 2016
11	Boredom	Topic: Boredom	April 19, 2016
12	Mattresses	Davidson and McKay investigate if the cost and quality of mattresses make a difference in sleep comfort.	May 3, 2016
13	Insults	Adam McKay and Rachel M Ward discuss insults such as Yo Mamma; Guest: E. Patrick Johnson	May 17, 2016
14	I Told You Sos	Adam Davidson and Adam McKay discuss psychology and implications of saying I Told You So; Guest: Janeane Garofalo	May 23, 2016
15	Extinct Hockey	John Hodgman learns that extinct hockey is not the only awesome form of sport. With Rachel Ward.	June 14, 2016
16	Follow ups	Alex Blumberg, Adam Davidson and Rachel Ward follow up some of the stories covered earlier such as concrete, free throws, mattresses.	June 29, 2016
17	Flossing	Rachel Ward and Maeve Higgins discuss flossing with a dentist.	July 27, 2016
18	Yoga	Adam Davidson and Rachel Ward examine merits of Yoga. Guest: Wendy Doniger, Michelle Goldberg	August 10, 2016
19	Cardboard	Topic: Cardboard	August 24, 2016
20	Crying		September 7, 2016
21	Postal Addresses		September 21, 2016
22	Wedding Planning		October 5, 2016
23	Update	Rachel Ward announces that she is moving on from Surprisingly Awesome to another Gimlet Media project. The search for a new host is on. This episode is also a preview for Twice Removed.	January 19, 2017
24	A Message from Gimlet CEO Alex Blumberg	Alex Blumberg announces that Surprisingly Awesome has been cancelled and gives a preview of a new show called Every Little Thing.	April 12, 2017

== Reception ==
The Guardian reviewed the show positively saying, "Three episodes in, Surprisingly Awesome has managed to live up to its name and its mission."
