= Fighting Discrimination =

Program of the organization Human Rights First

The Fighting Discrimination Program of Human Rights First focuses on the violence known as hate crimes or bias crimes. Because equality is a cornerstone of human rights protection, discrimination in all its forms is a violation of human rights. Discrimination can take the form of violence generated by prejudice and hatred founded upon a person's race, ethnicity, religious belief, sexual orientation, gender, disability, age or other such factors. Through the Fighting Discrimination Program, Human Rights First seeks to combat discrimination by reversing the tide of antisemitic, anti-immigrant, and anti-Muslim violence and reducing other bias crime in North America, Europe, and the Russian Federation.

In this effort, the Program looks at both the reality of violence driven by discrimination in each country and at two principal ways in which this violence can best be confronted.

The first is through hate crimes legislation and effective and equitable enforcement of criminal law to protect often vulnerable minorities. The Program's premise is that hate crimes should be treated as the exceptional crimes that they are and prosecuted as such, including with enhanced penalties.

Second, the fight against discrimination requires the monitoring and statistical reporting of incidents and crimes in which bias is an element – in order to provide analytical tools for policy makers and effective action to confront violence. Official anti-discrimination bodies can play a pivotal role in ensuring that monitoring occurs and effective anti-discrimination policies are then implemented.

== Advocacy efforts ==
In pursuing policy changes, the Fighting Discrimination Program works in cooperation with nongovernmental organizations throughout Europe and North America and advocates directly with the governments concerned and through intergovernmental organizations, such as the Organization for Security and Co-operation in Europe (OSCE), the United Nations (UN), the Council of Europe (CoE), and the European Parliament (Europarl).

Fighting Discrimination focuses on fifty-six countries of the OSCE.

The Organization for Security and Cooperation in Europe: the OSCE provides the main stage for the Fighting Discrimination Program's advocacy on the intergovernmental level. Human Rights First is well-established and respected within this important organization that brings together 56 countries in North America, Europe, and Central Asia. The OSCE has been very receptive and supportive of the program's activities during the past years. Human Rights First has consistently maintained a vocal presence at the annual Human Dimension Implementation Meetings (HDIMs) and was invited to participate in various roundtables and events hosted by the OSCE Office for Democratic Institutions and Human Rights (ODIHR).

The United Nations: the Fighting Discrimination Program was initiated in the aftermath of the 2001 Durban UN World Conference Against Racism (WCAR), which was attended by senior staff of Human Rights First. Hence, the UN is an important stage for the Program's initiatives. Apart from engaging in various advocacy opportunities at the UN, Fighting Discrimination has also played a role in moving the venue for the Durban Review Conference from South Africa to the Geneva, Switzerland. Human Rights First representatives took part in several Preparatory Committee Meetings and will be present at the Durban Review in 2009.

Over the years, the Fighting Discrimination Program has also been in direct contact with important government officials who deal with the issues of discrimination, hate crime, national minorities, antisemitism, and others. Human Rights First has established good rapport with the offices of the Council of Europe Commissioner for Human Rights, the OSCE High Commissioner on National Minorities, the Chair of the European Monitoring Centre on Racism and Xenophobia, the United States Special Envoy for Monitoring and Combating Antisemitism, and the OSCE Personal Representatives of the Chairman-in-Office on Combating Intolerance and Discrimination (Combating Racism, Xenophobia and Discrimination, Combating Antisemitism, and Combating Intolerance and Discrimination against Muslims), and the Russian Ombudsman for Human Rights.

The Fighting Discrimination Program often collaborates with other nongovernmental nonprofit organizations based in different countries. Combined advocacy efforts are known to have deeper impact and wider public reach. Some of the FD Program's NGO partners include the Sova Center for Information and Analysis, Amnesty International, Human Rights Watch, Human Rights Without Frontiers, International Service for Human Rights, Freedom House, Union of Councils for Soviet Jews, HIAS, Anti-Defamation League, American-Arab Anti-Discrimination Committee, Romani CRISS, ILGA-Europe, Center for Women's Global Leadership, and many others.

== Reports and publications ==
Since 2001, the Fighting Discrimination Program produced several groundbreaking comprehensive reports on hate crime, which were hailed by NGOs, the media, and representatives of governments and intergovernmental organizations. All publications are available for free on the Fighting Discrimination website. Starting in 2007, the program began producing the Annual Hate Crime Survey, supplemented with an online-based Hate Crime Report Card.

Hate Crime Survey
The 2008 Hate Crime Survey by Human Rights First provides the most comprehensive and up-to-date overview of hate crime in the 56 countries comprising the Organization for Security and Cooperation in Europe (OSCE). The Survey includes sections examining six facets of violent hate crime: Violence Based on Racism and Xenophobia, Antisemitic Violence, Violence Against Muslims, Violence Based on Religious Intolerance, Violence Against Romani, and Violence Based on Sexual Orientation and Gender Identity Bias.

The Survey also examines government responses to violent hate crimes in sections on Systems of Monitoring and Reporting and The Framework of Criminal Law and includes a Ten-Point Plan for governments to strengthen their responses. The Survey includes an in-depth look at the Russian Federation, Ukraine, and the United States and contains a Country Panorama section that profiles individual hate crime cases from more than 30 countries within the OSCE.

The Survey's unique and progressive presentation style allows separate chapters to be used as stand-alone reports. Thus, each section can be presented as a report on a particular dimension of bias-motivated violence.

Covers of all stand-alone reports in the 2008 Survey

Hate Crime Report Card
The Report Card — updated annually — is a useful web-based resource produced by Human Rights First to monitor government response to bias-motivated violence. Hate crimes have occurred at alarmingly high levels throughout much of Europe and North America. The first Human Rights First Hate Crime Survey documents dozens of hate crime cases, analyzes trends, and discusses the causes and consequences of hate crime violence. The Report Card is an innovative tool that examines hate crime laws and monitoring and reporting systems in the states that comprise the OSCE, regrettably finding that a majority of European governments get a poor grade in their efforts to tackle hate crimes. All 56 countries that comprise the OSCE are rated in the Report Card.

Country Focus
The 2008 Hate Crime Survey also takes an in-depth look at the Russian Federation, Ukraine, the United States, and contains a Country Panorama section that profiles individual hate crime cases from more than 30 countries within the Organization for Security and Cooperation in Europe.

Stand-alone reports on Russia, Ukraine, the United States, and Country Panorama

== Recommendations ==
The Fighting Discrimination Program's "Ten-Point Plan" for Combating Hate Crime was prepared to reference and guide the 56 participating states of the Organization for Security and Cooperation in Europe. The Ten-Point Plan call the governments to:

A full version of the Ten-Point Plan and specific recommendations to governments are available at the Program's Website.

== See also ==
- Hate crime
- Racism by country
