= The Giant Pool of Money =

2008 episode of the radio show This American Life

"The Giant Pool of Money" is an episode of the radio show This American Life which originally aired on May 9, 2008. The episode described to a general audience the causes and factors which led to the subprime mortgage crisis. Specifically, the show aimed to show the chain of people who were "participants up and down the subprime food chain".

The show featured Adam Davidson, a business correspondent for National Public Radio and Alex Blumberg, a producer for the show, interviewing and reporting on the 2008 financial crisis. Blumberg described it as trying to answer the question "why are they lending money to people who can't afford to pay it back?"

== Content of the show ==
The episode's name "The Giant Pool of Money" is derived from the description used in the show of fixed-income securities; it was identified in passing with the global saving glut. Davidson described it as follows:

Most people don't think about it but there's this huge pool of money out there, which is basically all the money the world is saving now. Insurance companies saving for a catastrophe, pension funds saving money for retirement, the central bank of England saving for whatever central banks save for. All the world's savings.

The show begins at a black tie gala, where an award is being presented for CDO of the year. The show does not lay blame on the financiers directly, going so far as to say "Let me just say, they're aware that there's a certain irony, giving awards to the instrument that almost destroyed the world's economy. They did consider canceling this year but it's been a really tough year, it's been really gloomy for them." They then proceed to the opposite end of the spectrum, with a borrower whose mortgage is in default.

After some background on what caused a shift in capital to mortgages, which they hypothesize to be Alan Greenspan's keeping fed funds rates low during the early 2000s, the show moves to Mike Francis, a Wall Street financier who worked at Morgan Stanley. From there, the show describes "another Mike", Mike Garner, who worked down the chain, at Silver State Mortgage. He described the pressures and motivations faced by mortgage salesmen. After describing that area of the chain, they moved on to a CDO investment management firm run by Jim Finkel of Dynamic Credit, LLC. Davidson through an interview with Finkel describes the nature and creation of CDOs.

After describing these market players, the show goes on to discuss the nature of the speculative bubble, highlighting real estate TV shows that sprung up during the bubble, such as A&E's Flip This House. The show then revisits some of the interviewees, describing the bursting of the bubble, both in terms of their business and personal fortunes. Blumberg and Davidson end with a prognosis of the financial system. Blumberg states "there's more talk that the next few years will feel like the 1970s. There are lots of technical differences between this crisis and Jimmy Carter's malaise. But for the average person, it could feel the same."

== Reception and legacy ==
The show was well received by listeners, stimulating ten times more listener feedback than average, all of it positive according to reporter Adam Davidson. In February 2009, Adam Davidson and Alex Blumberg were awarded the Polk Award for the episode. Chicago Public Radio's This American Life and National Public Radio, News Division won a Peabody Award for the episode, which the awards body deemed "impressive for the arresting clarity of its explanation of the financial crisis we're in, and even more so for its having aired so early – May 2008."

In 2010, "The Giant Pool of Money" was chosen by New York University's Arthur L. Carter Journalism Institute as one of the top ten works of journalism from the 2000s decade, ranking it number 4. In 2014, Slate ranked the episode on its list of "The 25 Best Podcast Episodes Ever" at number 2.

In 2021 the episode was deemed "culturally, historically, or aesthetically significant" by the Library of Congress and selected for preservation in the United States National Recording Registry, making it the first podcast to be added to the registry.

== Continuing coverage ==
The same team of producers have created three follow-up episodes to "The Giant Pool of Money" as "Your Guide to the Meltdown". On October 3, 2008, This American Life broadcast "Another Frightening Show About the Economy", examining what regulators could have done to prevent the economic crisis. "Bad Bank" aired February 27, 2009, explaining insolvent banks and toxic assets. Finally, on June 5, 2009, "The Watchmen" aired and examined the role of Congress and regulators since the creation of the American financial system in the 1930s.

A fifth episode, entitled "Return to the Giant Pool of Money" was aired on September 25, 2009. Davidson and Blumberg have also gone on to work with other NPR reporters on a regular podcast covering economics, global finance, and other business topics using similar storytelling techniques: NPR's Planet Money.
