= Adam Davidson (journalist) =

American journalist

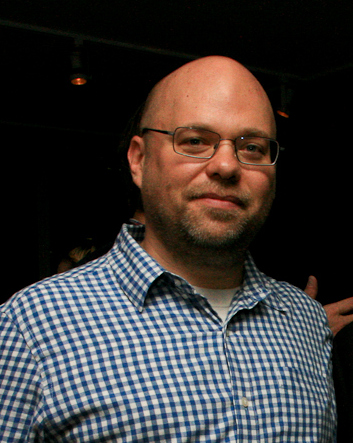
- Davidson in 2012
- Born: 1970 (age 55–56)
- Education: University of Chicago
- Occupation: Journalist
- Father: Jack Davidson
- Awards: George Polk Award

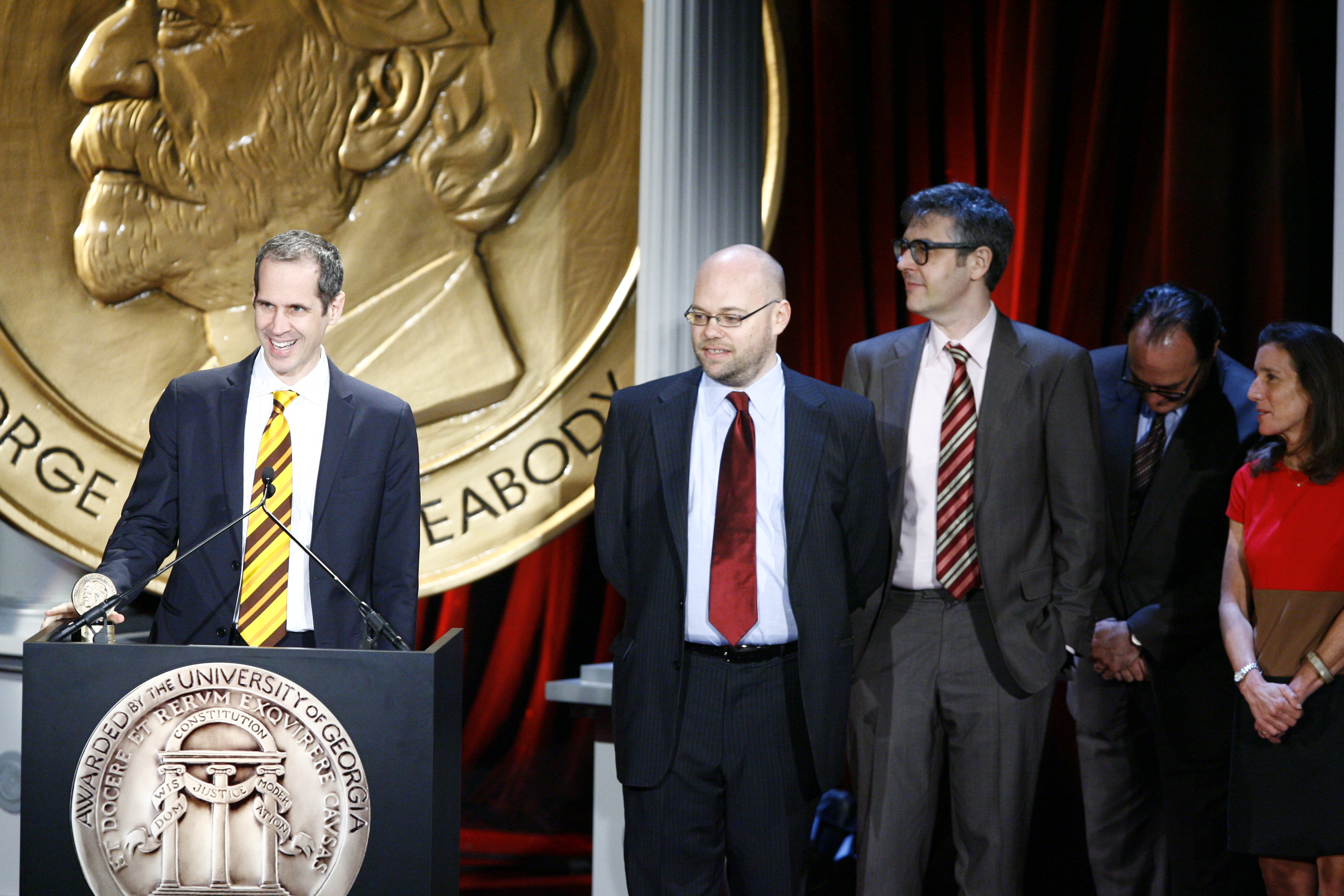
Alex Blumberg and the This American Life crew at the 68th Annual Peabody Awards for The Giant Pool of Money (left to right: Alex Blumberg, Adam Davidson, Ira Glass, Torey Malatia and Ellen Weiss)

Adam Davidson (born 1970) is an American journalist. He was a co-founder of NPR's Planet Money program. Previously he has covered globalization issues, the Asian tsunami, and the war in Iraq, for which he won the Daniel Schorr Journalism Prize. He and Adam McKay were former co-hosts of Surprisingly Awesome from Gimlet Media. Davidson worked as an economics columnist for The New York Times Magazine and in 2016 took a position at The New Yorker.

== Early life and education ==
Davidson's father, Jack Davidson, was a film and television actor, and he grew up in the Westbeth Artists Community in Manhattan's West Village. He attended college at the University of Chicago, graduating in 1992. Adam is an atheist of Jewish descent.

== Career ==
Davidson worked at PRI as a Middle East correspondent for Marketplace and then went on to work at NPR as the international business and economics correspondent. In 2008, Davidson, along with Alex Blumberg founded Planet Money on NPR.

He went on to write for the New York Times Magazine as an economics columnist. In 2016, he joined The New Yorker as a staff writer. In 2018, he left that position, but remained a contributing writer to the magazine. About a NewsGuild unionization drive which was promising to protect New Yorker writers from firings and unwanted editorial input, Davidson summed up the writers' consensus opinion, saying “None of us want to do anything that could jeopardize the magazine we love. We don’t want so strong a union that mediocrity reigns and it’s impossible to get rid of poor performers. We actually kind of like the feeling that we need to continue to earn our place."

In 2020 Davidson published a business advice book, The Passion Economy. He currently maintains a coaching practice for business storytelling.

== Awards ==
Davidson won the George Polk Award in Radio Reporting for his reporting with Alex Blumberg for a May 2008 show titled "The Giant Pool of Money". The piece explained the highly complex chain of events that led to the subprime mortgage crisis by showcasing interviews with participants at each sector of the crisis. The episode was linked widely in the blogosphere and remains one of the show's most-downloaded podcasts.

== Bibliography ==
- Davidson, Adam (April 13, 2016). "Bernienomics might not be feasible—but it's useful". The New York Times journal.
- — (March 13, 2017). "Donald Trump's worst deal : the President helped build a hotel in Azerbaijan that appears to be a corrupt operation engineered by oligarchs linked to Iran's Revolutionary Guard". A Reporter at Large. The New Yorker. Vol. 93, no. 4. pp. 48–57.
- — (April 24, 2017). "Sweet smell of success". The Financial Page. The New Yorker. Vol. 93, no. 10. p. 39.
- — (August 21, 2017). "No questions asked : Trump's firm barely vetted its foreign partners. Was this a lapse–or a business strategy?". A Reporter at Large. The New Yorker. Vol. 93, no. 24. pp. 20–28.
- — (April 14, 2018). "Michael Cohen and the End Stage of the Trump Presidency". News Desk. The New Yorker.
- — (2020). The Passion Economy: The New Rules for Thriving in the Twenty-First Century. Knopf Doubleday.
