= Diane Orentlicher =

American international law professor

Diane Orentlicher (/ˌɔːrəntˈlɪkər/ OR-ənt-LIK-ər) is a professor of international law at American University's Washington College of Law in Washington, D.C., and serves as Co-Faculty Director of its Center on Human Rights and Humanitarian Law. In the mid-1990s, she founded the law school's War Crimes Research Office, which provides legal analysis in support of international and transitional justice initiatives.

== Early career ==
Orentlicher, a native of Washington, DC, practiced international law at Steptoe and Johnson after graduating from law school. In 1983, she became the first deputy director of what was then called the Lawyers Committee for International Human Rights (now Human Rights First) and directed its Human Rights Program. During her years there, she undertook human rights field missions to the Philippines, Cambodia, Chile, Nicaragua, El Salvador, Honduras, Israel and other countries while supervising the organization's work in South Africa, Pakistan, Poland and other countries. Her mission to Cambodia in 1984, with Floyd Abrams, was the first time a Western group was allowed to visit territory controlled by the Khmer Rouge since it was ousted from Phnom Penh at the beginning of 1979.

She began teaching human rights as an adjunct professor at Harvard Law School in 1985, and has also taught at Yale, Columbia and Oxford Universities. In the late 1980s and early 1990s, she helped pioneer the subdiscipline of international business and human rights. She developed, and co-taught, the first course on the subject at Columbia University's business school and authored or co-authored several publications on the subject in the early 1990s. In 1992, she joined the faculty of American University Washington College of Law.

== Professional career ==
In the early 1990s, Orentlicher helped develop the legal framework for the field of transitional justice. In 1991, she published a seminal article on the international legal obligations of governments to address mass atrocities of a prior government. In the early 2000s, she served as the United Nations Independent Expert on combating impunity, updating the UN Set of Principles to Combat Impunity, a key "soft law" instrument guiding States’ efforts to address serious human rights violations in light of their international legal obligations. Since the mid-1990s, Orentlicher has also been involved in the field of international criminal justice, and on accountability for war crimes. She provided legal analysis to the first Prosecutor of the International Criminal Tribunal for the former Yugoslavia in The Hague and the International Criminal Tribunal for Rwanda.

Orentlicher has published numerous articles and books on international and transitional justice, often addressing the social and political impact of war crimes courts in countries emerging from violence. She is a member of the Council on Foreign Relations.

== Government Service ==
During the first term of the Obama Administration, Orentlicher served from 2009 through 2011 as Deputy, Office of War Crimes Issues, in the Department of State. In that capacity, she worked on the administration's review of United States’ policy toward the International Criminal Court and implementing the policy that emerged from that review; strengthening efforts to prevent violence against women; developing the administration's atrocities prevention initiative; and supporting international and hybrid tribunals.

In 1999, Orentlicher served as Special Advisor to the High Commissioner, on secondment from the U.S. Department of State.

== Selected publications ==
- Kampuchea, after the worst: A report on current violations of human rights, Human Rights First, 1985. ASIN B0006ELVLC
- Vigilantes in the Philippines: A Threat to Democratic Rule, Human Rights First, 1988. ISBN 9780934143035
- Human Rights in Indonesia and East Timor, Human Rights Watch, 1989. ISBN 9780929692074
- Human Rights, Foundation Press, 2001. ISBN 9781587780547
- ‘Settling Accounts’ Revisited: Reconciling Global Norms with Local Agency, International Journal of Transitional Justice, 2007. doi:10.1093/ijtj/ijm010
- Some Kind of Justice: The ICTY’s Impact in Bosnia and Serbia, Oxford University Press, 2018. ISBN 9780190882273
