= Zardulu =

Performance artist

Zardulu the Mythmaker is a performance artist based in New York City. Her identity is unknown, but she rose to prominence after several of her performance pieces went viral as hoax videos in 2015 and 2016. These videos included "Selfie Rat", "Three Eyed Fish", and others. The New York Times published an article discussing Zardulu's process and the nature of the videos themselves. Additionally, the Huffington Post ran an investigative article discussing the possibility that Zardulu herself might well be a hoax invented by one of the "actors" in her videos. Zardulu was also the subject of the February 25, 2016 episode of the podcast Reply All, "Zardulu." In fall 2018, TRANSFER, a New York gallery, hosted an exhibition of the artist's work at 321 Canal Street in collaboration with Wallplay and Vibes Studios' ON CANAL project.
