= It's About Damn Time =

2020 American book

It's About Damn Time: How to Turn Being Underestimated into Your Greatest Advantage
- Author: Arlan Hamilton
- Language: English
- Genre: Non-fiction
- Publisher: Penguin Random House
- Publication date: 2020
- Publication place: United States
- ISBN: 978-0-593-13641-6

It's About Damn Time: How to Turn Being Underestimated into Your Greatest Advantage is a 2020 American book written by Arlan Hamilton with Rachel L. Nelson. It's About Damn Time is "an empowering guide to finding your voice, working your way into any room you want to be in, and achieving your own dreams".

== Overview ==
Arlan Hamilton is an investor and the founder and managing partner of Backstage Capital. In 2015, Hamilton founded Backstage Capital, a fund that invests in underestimated founders: women, people of color, and members of the LGBT community. To date, Backstage Capital has invested in more than 180 startups.

The book's title refers to Hamilton's 2018 launch of a $36 million fund earmarked for companies founded by Black women. "They like to call it a diversity fund," Hamilton said, announcing the fund at the United State of Women Summit. "I call it the about damn time fund."

== Release ==
It's About Damn Time was first published in the United States by Penguin Random House in hardcover and e-book formats on May 5, 2020. An audiobook release narrated by Hamilton herself was released simultaneously.

== Reception ==
It's About Damn Time was named one of the 10 Best Business Books of The Year by Fortune.
