= Sandra (podcast) =

Fiction podcast by Gimlet

Sandra is a fiction podcast by Gimlet Media starring Alia Shawkat. The show follows Helen as she starts a new job at a tech giant that developed a virtual assistant called Sandra.

== Background ==
The podcast is produced by Gimlet Media. Sandra is the second fiction podcast by Gimlet. Alia Shawkat stars as the protagonist of the show named Helen. Sandra is the fictional equivalent of Amazon Alexa. All seven episodes were released on April 18, 2018. The show was written by Kevin Moffett and Matthew Derby. Sandra is powered by humans instead of AI. Helen starts working at a tech giant as a Sandra operator. The tech giant that developed Sandra is called Orbital Teledynamics. The company is based in her hometown of Guymon, Oklahoma. The rights to adapt the podcast into a television series were acquired by Wiip—the independent studio owned by Paul Lee. The show was adapted for Mexico and Brazil. The show has been compared to Black Mirror.
