= Nazanin Rafsanjani =

American television and radio producer

- Born: Iran
- Occupation: Producer
- Known for: The Rachel Maddow Show, Gimlet Media
- Spouse: Alex Blumberg

Nazanin Rafsanjani is an American television and radio producer. She was the head of new show development for Gimlet Media until 2020, and before that served as Gimlet's creative director and a senior producer for The Rachel Maddow Show.

== Education ==
Rafsanjani received her bachelor’s degree from UC Berkeley and completed her master’s in journalism at Columbia University.

== Career ==
In 2006, Rafsanjani reported on the Caspian Sea region as a NPR-Bucksbaum International Reporting Fellow. She was a producer at WNYC in 2010, then worked for MSNBC as a senior producer for The Rachel Maddow Show. She has also contributed to This American Life.

Rafsanjani was featured in the first season of Gimlet's podcast StartUp, consulting with her husband Alex Blumberg as he launched a media company then called American Podcasting Corporation. As the business grew, Rafsanjani elected to join the team to develop branded podcasts (podcasts produced by Gimlet on behalf of advertisers) as a source of revenue for the firm. Consequently, Rafsanjani left her position at MSNBC in 2015 to join Gimlet as the creative director.

The first branded podcast from Rafsanjani's four-person creative team at Gimlet was a six-episode series for eBay called Open for Business, which hit number one on the iTunes podcast chart. She has been praised for the journalism and producing skills she brought to Gimlet's marketing projects, hiring fellow journalists for her team at Gimlet Creative including Katelyn Bogucki from The Huffington Post and Frances Harlow from NPR's Planet Money. Rafsanjani later became the head of new show development at Gimlet, a role she continued to hold after Gimlet was sold to Spotify in 2019.

Rafsanjani has served on the board of directors of Human Rights First since 2021. Additionally, she is a member of the 2022-23 editorial board of the Brooklyn Law Review.

== Honors and awards ==
In 2013, Rafsanjani was nominated for an Emmy Award, with The Rachel Maddow Show team, for Outstanding News Discussion and Analysis.

In 2018, she was named one of Fast Company's "Most Creative People in Business."
