= Hyperfixed =

Documentary podcast by Alex Goldman

- Genre: Documentary
- Language: English

Cast and voices
- Hosted by: Alex Goldman

Publication
- Original release: October 2, 2024
- Provider: Radiotopia (PRX)
- Updates: Biweekly

Related
- Website: hyperfixedpod.com

Hyperfixed is a documentary problem-solving podcast created and hosted by journalist and audio producer Alex Goldman. Produced in partnership with Radiotopia from PRX, the show debuted on October 2, 2024.

== Format ==
Listeners submit dilemmas ranging from minor annoyances to life decisions. Goldman investigates each submission, interviewing experts and participants, tracing the systems behind the problem, and working toward a resolution or explanation. Episodes typically run 30–60 minutes and release biweekly.

== Production ==
Goldman independently owns Hyperfixed and distributes it through a partnership with Radiotopia from PRX. Emma Courtland and Amor Yates produced the show's early episodes. A premium tier via Supporting Cast offers ad-free and bonus episodes.

== Reception and notable coverage ==
Writing in The Times, critic James Marriott called Hyperfixed "just wonderful," comparing its inquisitive tone to Goldman's earlier work on Reply All and singling out episodes on supermarket fridges and measurement systems for their humor. The Financial Times praised Goldman's solo hosting and the show's investigative format, highlighting episodes on supermarket energy efficiency and whether to have children. Radio New Zealand also reviewed the show, describing it as Goldman's new listener-problem format. TechCrunch profiled Goldman's production setup as part of its "How I Podcast" series.

== See also ==
- Reply All (podcast)
