= Reply All (podcast) =

American podcast from Gimlet Media

- Genre: Technology; human interest

Cast and voices
- Hosted by: Alex Goldman; PJ Vogt; Emmanuel Dzotsi

Publication
- No. of episodes: 189
- Original release: November 24, 2014 – June 23, 2022
- Provider: Gimlet Media

Reception
- Ratings: 1,000,000

Related
- Website: gimletmedia.com/reply-all/

Reply All is an American podcast from Gimlet Media that ran from 2014 to 2022, featuring stories about how people shape the Internet, and how the Internet shapes people. It was created by P. J. Vogt and Alex Goldman, who were the show's original hosts; they had previously hosted the technology and culture podcast TLDR for WNYC. Emmanuel Dzotsi became a third cohost in 2020.

The podcast received critical acclaim, winning several awards. In 2021, Vogt and another producer left the show following backlash critical of the work environment. Both Goldman and Dzotsi left the show in 2022 with the final episode released on June 23 of that year.

== History ==
Reply All was an American podcast from Gimlet Media, hosted by Alex Goldman and PJ Vogt, with Emmanuel Dzotsi joining on as a host in October 2020. Before joining Gimlet, Vogt and Goldman hosted a technology and culture podcast called TLDR for WNYC. Reply All premiered November 24, 2014, the second podcast to be developed by Gimlet Media. The Atlantic included the episode "Shine on, You Crazy Goldman" on their list of "The 50 Best Podcast Episodes of 2015".

Producers of Reply All included Phia Bennin, Tim Howard, Damiano Marchetti, Anna Foley, Jessica Yung, Lisa Wang, and formerly Sruthi Pinnamaneni. The music is by Breakmaster Cylinder. In 2020, Dzotsi became a third cohost.

In early 2021, the podcast began releasing a series of episodes called "The Test Kitchen", which covered allegations of a racist and toxic work environment at the food magazine Bon Appétit. After the second episode aired, accusations from former employees of a "near identical" environment at Gimlet were reported online. On February 17, 2021, both Vogt and Pinnamaneni announced they were leaving the show. The show was then placed on a hiatus until June 10, 2021.

On May 18, 2022, it was announced that hosts Dzotsi and Goldman were leaving the show and the current iteration of Reply All would end on June 23, 2022.

== Format ==
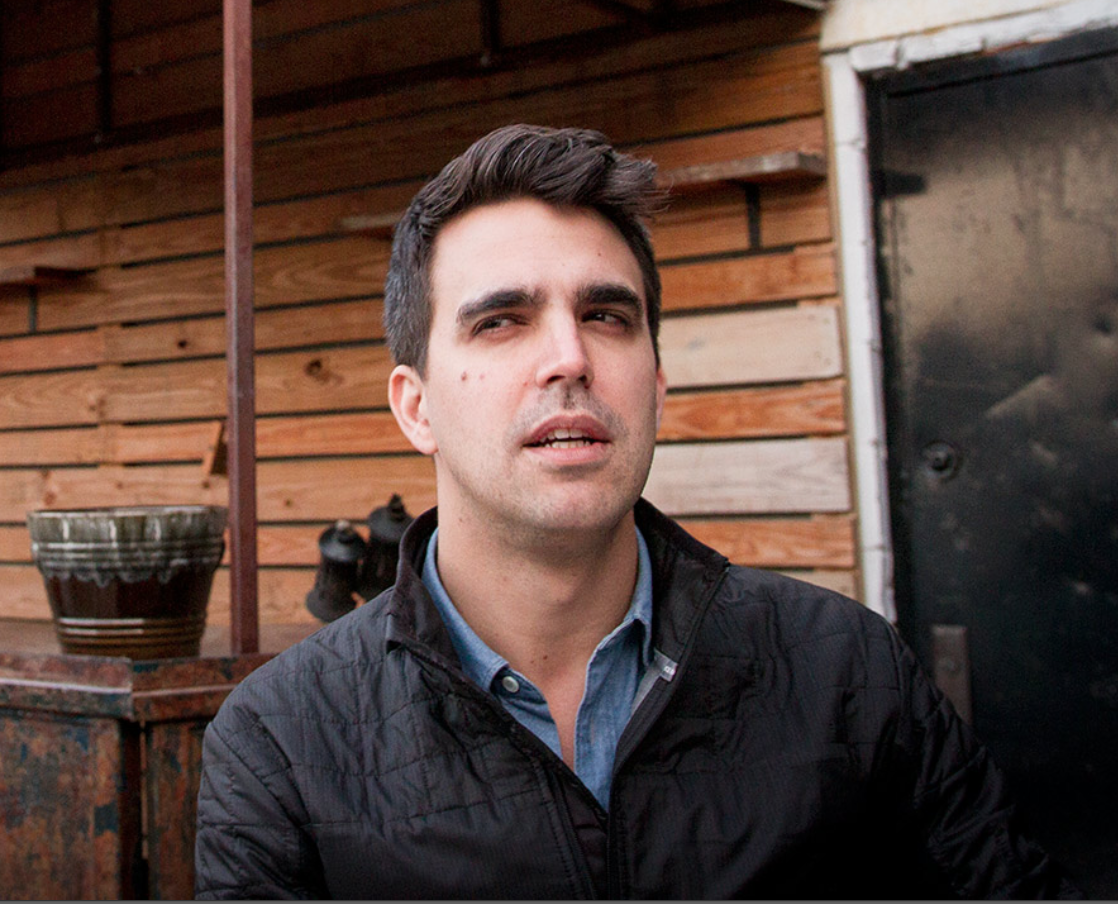
Former co-host P. J. Vogt

Each episode varies in format, with some recurring segments, including "Yes, Yes, No" which debuted in episode 10, in which Vogt and Goldman explain Internet trivia to Alex Blumberg, co-founder of Gimlet Media, with occasional help from outside guests. In a variation on this segment called "Sports, Sports, Sports", Blumberg instead explains sports-related tweets to Vogt and Goldman. The segment debuted in episode 106, "Is that You, KD?". In another recurring segment, called "Super Tech Support" which debuted in episode 33, the Reply All team—particularly Goldman, who previously worked as a network administrator—takes on odd or especially complex tech support issues that the listeners or friends of the hosts have encountered. An annual segment, Email Debt Forgiveness Day, created an annual holiday on April 30 inviting listeners to send responses to old emails no matter how overdue.

== Episodes ==
Reply All released 189 episodes from 2014 to 2022.

== Reception ==
The podcast was nominated in 2015 and 2016 for a Shorty Award. The nomination cited its unusual social media presence, including an event where the hosts accepted phone calls from listeners for 48 hours straight. In 2016, the Mixcloud Online Radio Awards (MORA) nominated it as "Best Online Talk Show" in education. The show was also nominated for a Webby Award for Best Podcast. The podcast won the 2015 Academy of Podcasters Awards in the category "Technology."

In 2017, it was announced that director Richard Linklater would direct a movie about American quack physician John R. Brinkley, to star Robert Downey Jr., based on the 2017 Reply All episode "Man of the People".

In 2017, Quartz awarded episode 102, "Long Distance", as "Best Tech Episode" of the year. In 2019, the podcast was named the best podcast of the year by Dutch newspaper De Volkskrant and the sixth best podcast of the year by The New Yorker.

In March 2020, the podcast released episode 158, "The Case of the Missing Hit" to wide acclaim. The New York Times reported that the number of overall listeners to the show increased 35 percent across platforms in the days after its release. Hannah J. Davies of The Guardian called it "perhaps the best-ever episode of any podcast" and "an incredibly emotive piece of storytelling."

== See also ==
- Hyperfixed
- Internet culture
- List of technology podcasts
