= The Pitch (podcast) =

Business podcast

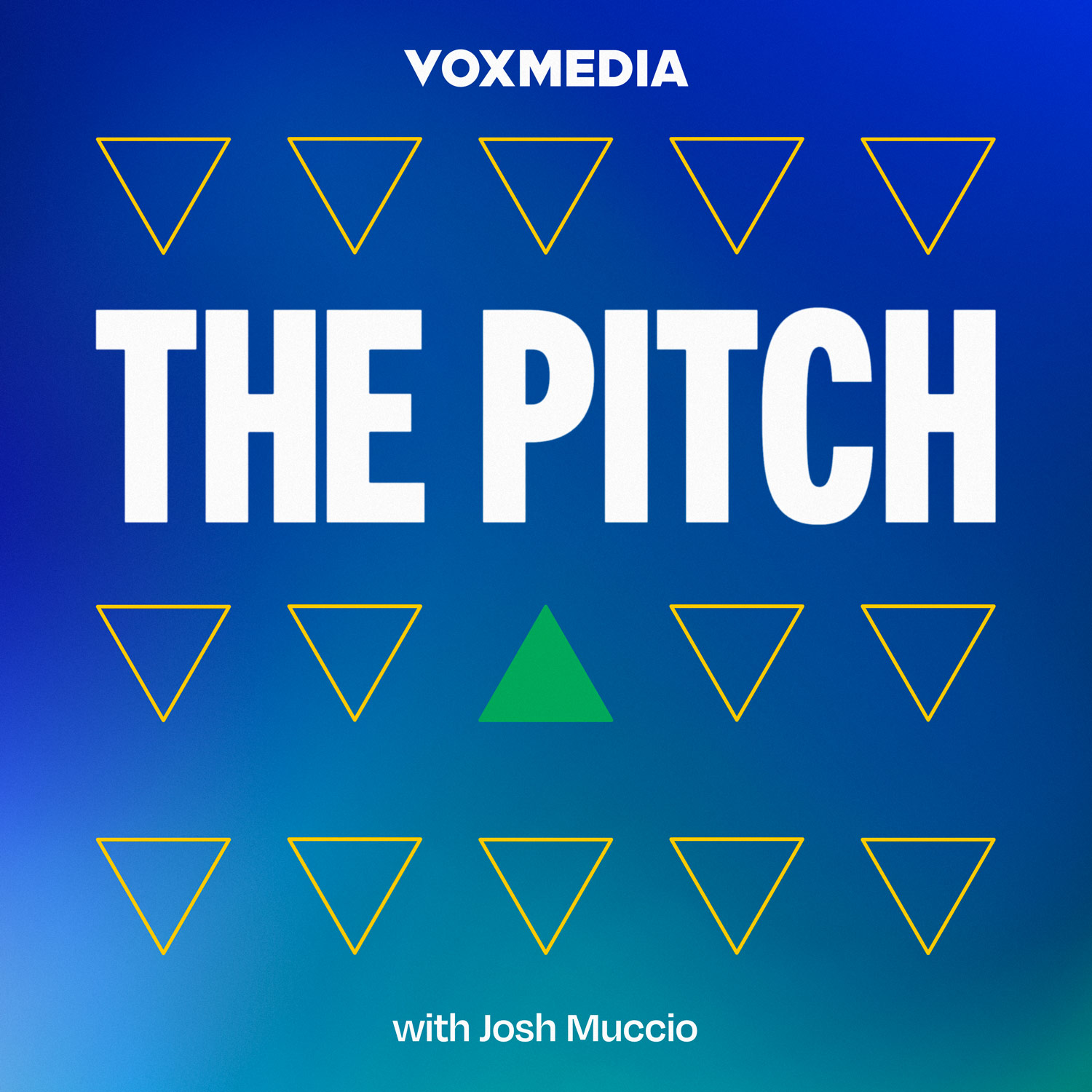
- Genre: Business, Startup, Venture capital
- Language: English

Cast and voices
- Hosted by: Josh Muccio

Publication
- No. of episodes: 100
- Original release: 2015
- Provider: Josh Muccio
- Updates: Active, weekly

Reception
- Cited as: 13 Entrepreneur Podcasts You Should Be Listening to Right Now 12 Best Podcasts For Entrepreneurs

Related
- Website: www.thepitch.show

The Pitch is an American podcast hosted by Josh Muccio, produced in partnership with Vox Media. The show features entrepreneurs in need of venture funding as they pitch to a live panel of investors, similar to ABC's hit TV series Shark Tank. Billed as, "A show where real entrepreneurs pitch to real investors—for real money", the podcast aims to capture the essence of what happens when entrepreneurs pitch investors.

== History ==
The first episode of The Pitch premiered on June 21, 2015, with investor Sheel Mohnot appearing as Muccio's cohost. In September 2016, it was announced that the second season of the podcast would begin airing in 2017 and feature a panel of VC's making investment decisions on the spot. In June 2017, it was announced that The Pitch had joined Gimlet Media. They produced eight seasons of the show with Gimlet from 2017 to 2020.

Then in July 2022, after the sale of Gimlet Media to Spotify, host Josh Muccio purchased The Pitch back from Gimlet for an undisclosed sum. Four months later it was announced that the show had signed a new partnership with Vox Media. The podcast would remain independently owned and produced while Vox would handle sales, marketing and distribution.
