= Lisa Pollak =

American journalist and author (born c. 1970)

- Education: Medill School of Journalism
- Occupation: Journalist
- Employers: The Baltimore Sun (1996–2004); This American Life (2004–2013)
- Awards: Pulitzer Prize for Feature Writing (1997)
- Website: www.lisapollak.com

Lisa Pollak (born c. 1970) is an American journalist and author. She won the 1997 Pulitzer Prize for Feature Writing.

== Education and career ==
She published her first professional newspaper article in 1985 as a high school student in Bloomfield Hills, Michigan, an account of a Tu B'Shevat tree planting ceremony for the Detroit Jewish News.

She earned a B.A. in American Culture from the University of Michigan, Ann Arbor while working for the student newspaper The Michigan Daily. After graduating in 1990, she earned a master's degree in journalism from the Medill School of Journalism at Northwestern University in 1992. She worked as a reporter at The Charlotte Observer from 1992 to 1994 and for The Raleigh News and Observer from to 1994 to 1996. For the latter paper, she earned the Ernie Pyle Award for Human Interest Writing in 1995.

Pollack was a reporter for the Baltimore Sun from 1996 to 2004. She was awarded the Pulitzer Prize for her 1996 Baltimore Sun story "The Umpire's Son," about the family of baseball umpire John Hirschbeck, whose son died of adrenoleukodystrophy (ALD) in 1993 at age 8. The Pulitzer citation stated the award was "for her compelling portrait of a baseball umpire who endured the death of a son while knowing that another son suffers from the same deadly genetic disease."

From 2004 to 2013, Pollak was a producer and reporter for This American Life. She is currently an independent journalist and adjunct professor at the Columbia University Graduate School of Journalism.

Pollak is married to journalist Chuck Salter.
