= StartUp (podcast) =

Business podcast

- Genre: Radio podcast on business

Cast and voices
- Hosted by: Alex Blumberg and Lisa Chow

Publication
- No. of seasons: 8
- No. of episodes: 93
- Original release: September 5, 2014 – present
- Provider: Gimlet Media
- Updates: Weekly

Reception
- Ratings: 1,000,000 (roughly, per month)

Related
- Adaptations: Alex, Inc.
- Website: www.gimletmedia.com/startup/

StartUp is an American podcast from Gimlet Media hosted by Alex Blumberg and Lisa Chow. While the first two seasons follow stories of starting businesses – Season 1 about the starting of Gimlet Media itself, and Season 2, a dating company called "Dating Ring" – the third season follows one business per episode. Season 4 began by following Gimlet Media again, then aired episodes focusing on other companies. Season 6 followed the making of the TV series created about the podcast. The most recent season covers the founding of Success Academy Charter Schools in New York City. The final season of Startup premiered in late 2019 and covered the process of selling Gimlet Media to the streaming media company Spotify.

The first episode was released on September 5, 2014, featuring Alex Blumberg pitching his company to venture investor Chris Sacca. As of February 2015, the podcast received roughly 1,000,000 listens per month.

Alex, Inc., a sitcom based on the podcast, premiered on ABC on March 28, 2018. The series stars Zach Braff, with Blumberg serving as an executive producer. The series was cancelled after the first season.

== Reception ==
Jack Conway of Podcast Review called the show "[c]onfessional and genuinely thrilling."

=== Awards ===
Award	Year	Category	Result	Ref.
Academy of Podcasters	2015	Business	Finalist	
Academy of Podcasters	2016	Business	Won	
