= Vaginal steaming =

Pseudoscientific form of alternative medicine

Vaginal steaming, sometimes shortened to V-steaming and also known as wormwood steaming, is an alternative health treatment wherein a woman squats or sits over steaming water containing herbs such as mugwort, rosemary, wormwood, and basil. It has been practiced in Africa (Mozambique, South Africa), Asia (Indonesia, Thailand), and Central America (among the Q'eqchi' people).

Vaginal steaming is described in spas as an ancient Chinese treatment for reproductive organ ailments and is claimed to have other benefits. No empirical evidence supports any of these claims. It has become a fad for women in the Western world.

There is no evidence that vaginal steaming has any benefits, while there is evidence that it can be dangerous.

== Prevalence ==
According to a study on vaginal practices by the World Health Organization published in 2011, one of the ways in which women practice vaginal care is by "Vaginal steaming or smoking: the 'steaming' or 'smoking' of the vagina, by sitting above a source of heat (fire, coals, hot rocks) on which water, herbs, or oils are placed to create steam or smoke". For that study, over 4,000 women in Tete (Mozambique), KwaZulu-Natal (South Africa), Yogyakarta (Indonesia), and Chonburi (Thailand) were asked about their vaginal care. When it came to vaginal steaming/smoking, very different results were obtained, and very different reasons were given for using the practice: in Chonburi, 67% of women reported having performed vaginal steaming or smoking, "which they associated with maintaining wellness and feminine identity", especially after having given birth (85.5%). In Tete, only 10% of women practiced steaming or smoking, "mostly intended to enhance male sexual pleasure by causing vaginal tightening (64.1% of users) and drying (22.9%)". In the two African locations, 37–38% of women said they practiced it to enhance "male sexual pleasure"; in the two Asian ones, 0% gave that answer. Conversely, of the Asian women 26% reported their "feminine identity" was a reason, compared to 0% of the African women.

== Risks ==
Side effects and potential dangers include allergic reactions, second-degree burns if the steam is too close, and vaginal infections like yeast infections and urinary tract infection (uti).

== Society and culture ==
In a paper for Culture, Health & Sexuality, Vandenburg and Braun argue that the rhetoric of vaginal steaming mirrors sexist Western discourse about the supposed inherent dirtiness of the female body, and that its claims of improved fertility and sexual pleasure continue the view that the female body exists for male sexual pleasure and childbearing.

=== Marketing ===
Vaginal steaming is marketed with the pseudoscientific notions of "balancing" female hormones and "revitalizing" the uterus or vagina. In an article for Goop, actress Gwyneth Paltrow, in reviewing a Santa Monica, California spa, described several of their treatments and said of one, "[y]ou sit on what is essentially a mini-throne, and a combination of infrared and mugwort steam cleanses your uterus, et al". A report in The Guardian responded by debunking the claim of the heat, steam, and mugwort having any benefit, and noted it could be harmful.

A 2017 survey by Vandenburg and Braun (taking as its title one observer's characterization – "Basically, it's sorcery for your vagina") analyzed "90 online items related to vaginal steaming", including from newspapers and magazines, blogs, and providers of the practice. They identified a general theme, that of the "self-improving woman", which they argue fits in perfectly with modern constructions of what scholarship has called the "neoliberal" woman, a woman who, free of outside influences, seeks to optimize herself and her health (see Healthism). Within that theme, they found four attitudes that promote healthist practices such as vaginal steaming:

1. The female body is inherently defective and dirty, and deteriorates with age: "the female body [is] situated within this biologically-determinist narrative of inevitable decline" which can be resisted.
2. Western medicine and bodily care (including tampon use, for instance) make the female genitalia unnaturally full of toxins, a process that can be reversed by the natural practice of vaginal steaming (the authors note that such accounts use language derived from Western medicine—"symptoms", "decline", "ailments").
3. Health enhancement, and the optimization of the body, specifically fertility and sexual pleasure, with much of the language used by advertisers of spas focusing on "maintenance" and "restoration", reinforcing both healthism and the fetishization of youth; vaginal steaming, it is claimed, improves marriages and the male libido. According to the authors, "the sexual and reproductive enhancement focus mirrors the two modes through which Western societies have traditionally valued women: sexual availability for men (within marriage) and childbearing".
4. The pampering of the self-assured woman, a luxury as well as a right that they have earned, with advertising playing on the "reawakening" of the "inner goddess": "To awaken your inner goddess, please call us at..." The idea is that the practice allows a woman to reach her true potential, her true self.

The authors conclude that vaginal steaming is one of many practices that fit "neoliberal, postfeminist and healthist ideologies, colliding with pervasive sociocultural understandings of the female reproductive body both as core of womanhood and as 'embodied pathology'".
