= Alex Blumberg =

American radio journalist

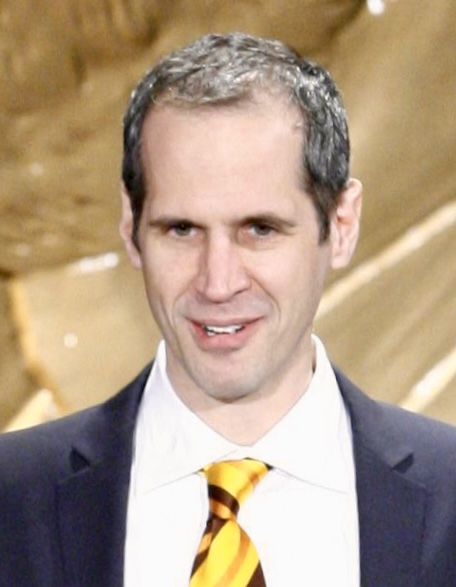
- Blumberg at the 68th Annual Peabody Awards in 2009.
- Education: Oberlin College
- Occupations: Producer, Journalist
- Spouse: Nazanin Rafsanjani
- Writing career
- Notable awards: George Polk Award

Alex Blumberg is an American entrepreneur, radio journalist, former producer for public radio and television, best known for his work with This American Life, Planet Money, and How to Save a Planet. He was the co-founder and CEO of the podcast network Gimlet Media.

== Career ==
Blumberg received a B.A. from Oberlin College and is currently an adjunct professor of journalism at Columbia University. After graduating, Blumberg lived in Russia for a year before returning to his hometown of Cincinnati, Ohio and eventually moving to Chicago. In Chicago, he taught science at a private school for four years. In 1994, he spent the summer interning at Harper's Magazine in Brooklyn. Later, he was introduced to Ira Glass through a mutual connection and was able to land a position as an administrative assistant on This American Life. From 1999 to 2014 he was the producer for the public radio show This American Life and his stories were regularly featured on the show. From 2007 to 2009 he was the executive producer of the television version of This American Life.

Prior to This American Life, he worked as a freelance radio reporter, contributing to This American Life, the Savvy Traveller and Chicago Public Radio. In 2008 he collaborated with National Public Radio economics correspondent Adam Davidson to co-host the Planet Money podcast, which posts new episodes twice weekly.

In August 2014, he started Gimlet Media along with Matthew Lieber. Initially pitched as the American Podcasting Corporation (APC), Gimlet Media is a podcasting business. Blumberg documented the startup process in the first season of a podcast hosted on Gimlet Media, titled StartUp. The second season follows "Dating Ring", another startup company. Apart from StartUp, Gimlet Media has launched several other podcasts, including Mystery Show, Surprisingly Awesome, and Reply All. The company raised $1.5 million in seed funding. After raising most of its initial capital from investment firms Betaworks, Lowercase Capital, and Knight Enterprise Fund, Gimlet invited the listeners of its shows to help raise the last $200,000 through crowdfunding platform Alphaworks. In December 2015, Gimlet closed a Series A round of funding that raised $6 million at a $30 million valuation. On February 6, 2019, the Swedish audio streaming service Spotify announced that it had entered into a definitive agreement to acquire Gimlet Media. Blumberg departed Spotify in November 2022, after his remaining projects were cancelled by the parent company, and many employees were laid off. In June 2023, Gimlet ceased to exist and remaining projects and employees were absorbed into Spotify Studios.

== Awards ==
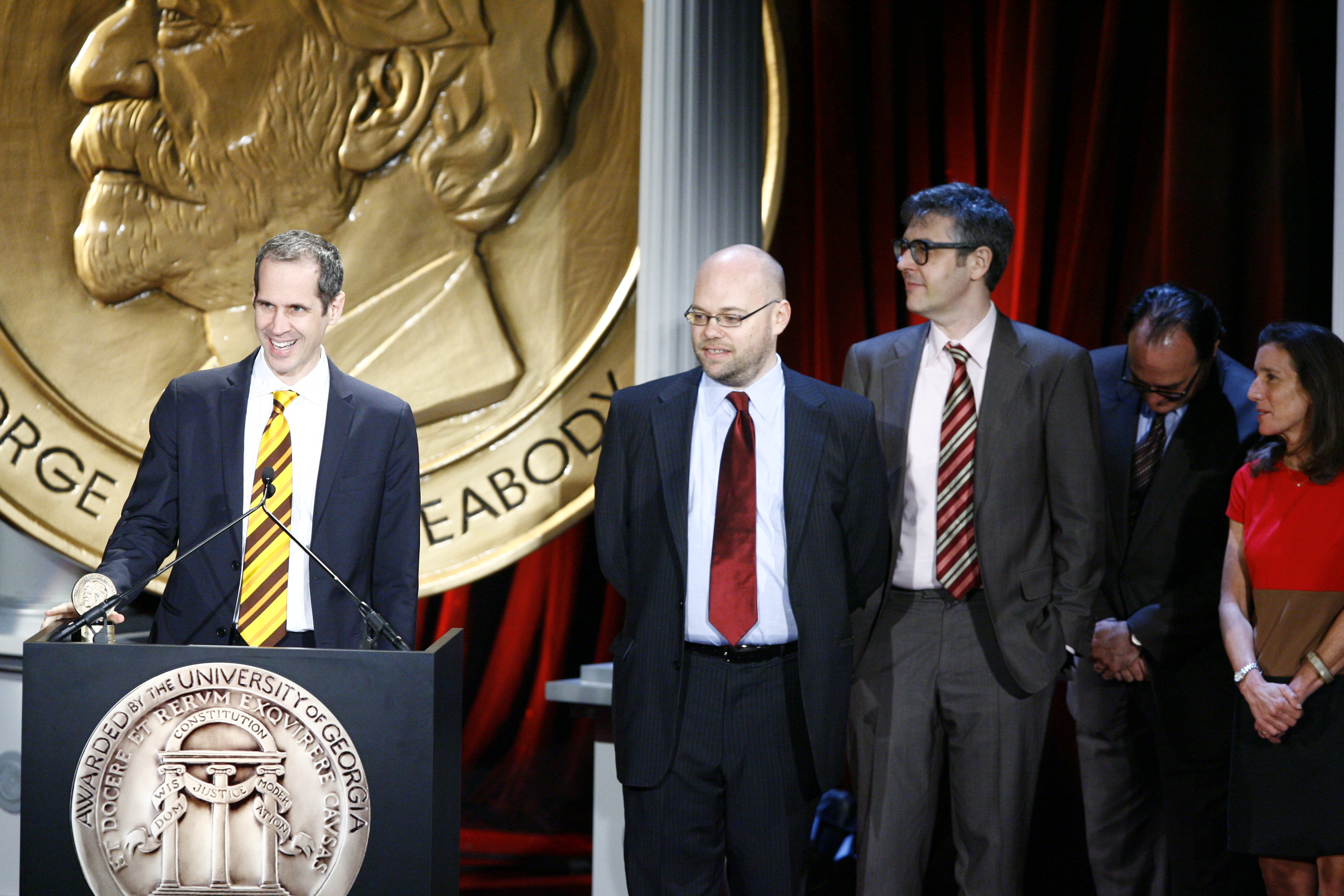
Alex Blumberg and the This American Life crew at the 68th Annual Peabody Awards for The Giant Pool of Money (left to right: Alex Blumberg, Adam Davidson, Ira Glass, Torey Malatia and Ellen Weiss)

Blumberg won the George Polk Award in Radio Reporting for his reporting with Adam Davidson for a May 2008 This American Life show titled "The Giant Pool of Money". The piece explained the highly complex chain of events that led to the subprime mortgage crisis by showcasing interviews with participants at each sector of the crisis. The episode was linked widely in the blogosphere and remains one of the show's most-downloaded podcasts.

He won first place at the 2002 Third Coast International Audio Festival for his story "Yes, There is a Baby." His story on clinical medical ethicists won the 1999 Public Radio News Directors Incorporated (PRNDI) award for best radio documentary. In 2009, he appeared on an April 12 Episode of NBC's Meet the Press to discuss the 2008 financial crisis.

He shared three Gerald Loeb Awards: the 2013 Broadcast Enterprise award for "When Patents Attack" on This American Life, the 2014 Online award for "Planet Money Makes A T-Shirt," and the 2017 Audio award for his story "Dov Charney’s American Dream".
