= Gimlet Media =

Digital media company

Gimlet Media LLC
- Type: Subsidiary
- Industry: Radio
- Genre: Podcasts
- Founded: 2014
- Founders: Alex Blumberg; Matthew Lieber
- Defunct: 2023
- Headquarters: New York, New York, US
- Key people: Alex Blumberg (CEO)
- Products: StartUp; Reply All; Crimetown; The Pitch; Science Vs
- Parent: Spotify (2019–2023)
- Website: gimletmedia.com

Gimlet Media LLC was a digital media company and podcast network, focused on producing narrative podcasts and headquartered in Brooklyn, New York. The company was founded in 2014 by Alex Blumberg and Matthew Lieber, who served as the company's CEO and president respectively until both left the company in 2022. In February 2019, Spotify announced it had entered into a definitive agreement to acquire Gimlet for $230 million. In 2023, Spotify announced that they were merging Gimlet and Parcast into Spotify Studios.

== History ==
Gimlet was founded in August 2014 with the launch of its flagship podcast StartUp hosted by Alex Blumberg. Originally billed as the American Podcasting Corporation (APC), Blumberg was eventually convinced to change the company's name. After working with Lexicon Branding, Blumberg and Lieber chose the name Gimlet Media.

The company raised $1.5 million in seed funding at a $10 million valuation. After raising most of its initial capital from investment firms Betaworks, Lowercase Capital, and Knight Enterprise Fund, Gimlet invited the listeners of its shows to help raise the last $200,000 through equity crowdfunding. The company was estimated to bring in $2 million in advertising revenue in 2015. In December 2015, Gimlet closed a Series A round of funding that raised $6 million at a $30 million valuation.

In July 2015, Gimlet announced it would add the option to pay for membership, a decision motivated by a desire to diversify revenue streams to include more than advertising. Members were given early access to pilots for new Gimlet shows, a Gimlet T-shirt, and access to the company's Slack channel. Gimlet then hired Blumberg's spouse and former Rachel Maddow Show producer Nazanin Rafsanjani to explore other ways to diversify the company's revenue. Rafsanjani spearheaded Gimlet Creative, a wing of the company that, it said, "creates highly produced narrative audio in partnership with brands."

On August 2, 2017, Gimlet announced it closed a $15 million Series B investment round, led by Stripes Group. Emerson Collective, Graham Holdings, Betaworks, and Cross Culture Investors also contributed to the round. In September 2017, British advertising firm WPP announced it was investing $5 million in Gimlet for a minority stake in the company.

On February 6, 2019, Spotify announced that it had entered into a definitive agreement to acquire Gimlet for $230 million. One month later, 75% of staff at Gimlet Media went public with their union campaign, signing cards and seeking voluntary recognition. In April 2021, the employees ratified their first collective agreement. It would last 3 years, with minimum base salary of $73,000 for Gimlet producers. Absent was any provision over worker ownership of content. In the summer of 2022, Lieber left his role as president but remained an advisor to Spotify. In November 2022, Alex Blumberg also departed Gimlet and Spotify. On June 5, 2023, Spotify sent a memo to staff announcing that Gimlet will be merged with Parcast into a single Spotify Studios division, as part of a restructuring that also included the elimination of 200 jobs.

== People ==
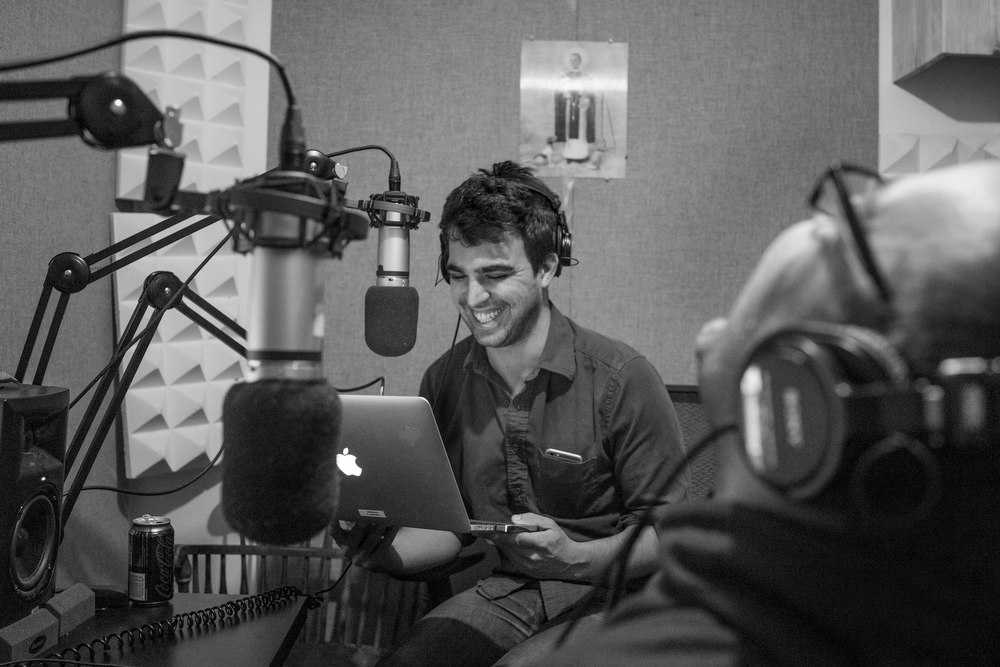
Former Reply All host PJ Vogt recording at Gimlet Media Office

Alex Blumberg, a radio journalist, producer for This American Life, and co-founder of Planet Money, came up with the idea of a for-profit podcast network after the success of a T-shirt fundraising campaign for Planet Money. He chose to document the foundation of Gimlet in the first season of StartUp, the company's first show.

Gimlet's co-founder, Matthew Lieber, holds an MBA from the MIT Sloan School of Management, is a former radio producer at WNYC, and worked as a management consultant with the Boston Consulting Group.

Lydia Polgreen was managing director until she left for The New York Times.

== Shows ==
Title	Host(s) / Cast	Genre	Debut	Last episode
Science Vs	Wendy Zukerman	Science	July 28, 2016^{*}	
Heavyweight	Jonathan Goldstein	Documentary	September 23, 2016	December 21, 2023
Crimetown	Marc Smerling and Zac Stuart-Pontier	Documentary	November 20, 2016	March 11, 2019
Every Little Thing	Flora Lichtman	Documentary	April 17, 2017	October 11, 2023
The Pitch	Josh Muccio	Business documentary	June 14, 2017^{**}	Dec 9, 2020
Mogul	Reggie Osse (season 1), Brandon Jenkins (season 2)	Hip-hop documentary	June 16, 2017	July 28, 2021
Uncivil	Chenjerai Kumanyika. Jack Hitt cohosted season 1	History	October 4, 2017	November 9, 2018
Story Pirates	The Story Pirates	Kids	November 20, 2017^{***}	August 11, 2022
Chompers	Rachel Ward	Kids	March 1, 2018	July 30, 2023
Without Fail	Alex Blumberg	Talk show	October 1, 2018	April 20, 2020
Conviction	Saki Knafo	Investigative journalism	February 4, 2019	March 24, 2023
Motherhood Sessions	Alexandra Sacks	Family life	April 11, 2019	March 19, 2020
The Two Princes	Noah Galvin, Ari'el Stachel, Christine Baranski, Shohreh Aghdashloo, Matthew Rhys, Samira Wiley	Scripted	June 4, 2019	October 20, 2020
The Journal.	Kate Linebaugh and Ryan Knutson	Journalism	June 26, 2019	
Motherhacker	Carrie Coon, Tavi Gevinson, Lucas Hedges, Pedro Pascal, and Alan Cumming	Fiction, Scripted	November 13, 2019	June 7, 2021
The Scaredy Cats Horror Show	PJ Vogt and Alex Goldman	Pop Culture	April 30, 2020	June 23, 2020
How to Save a Planet	Alex Blumberg, Ayana Elizabeth Johnson, Kendra Pierre-Louis	Climate journalism	July 31, 2020	October 6, 2022
Resistance	Saidu Tejan-Thomas Jr.	Politics, Current Events	October 14, 2020	December 15, 2021
Reply All	Alex Goldman, PJ Vogt (2014−2021), and Emmanuel Dzotsi (2020−2022). Dzotsi joined in October 2020. Vogt departed amid controversy in February 2021.	Internet culture	November 23, 2014	June 22, 2022
Mystery Show	Starlee Kine	Mystery	May 22, 2015	July 31, 2015
Sampler	Brittany Luse	Podcasts	January 20, 2016	October 17, 2016
Undone	Pat Walters	Documentary	November 14, 2016	January 23, 2017
Surprisingly Awesome	Adam Davidson and Adam McKay (2015–2016); Rachel Ward (2016)	Documentary	November 3, 2015	April 12, 2017*
Twice Removed	A. J. Jacobs	Genealogy	December 16, 2016	June 16, 2017
StartUp	Alex Blumberg (Season 1−) and Lisa Chow (Season 2−)	Business documentary	September 5, 2014	October 18, 2019
The Nod	Brittany Luse & Eric Eddings	Culture	July 17, 2017	January 20, 2020
The Cut on Tuesdays	Molly Fischer	Journalism	October 16, 2018	December 17, 2019

^{*} Science Vs was originally launched and produced by the Australian Broadcasting Corporation (ABC) as part of ABC Radio's First Run digital-first podcast program, before Gimlet announced in October 2015 the podcast was moving to and relaunching on their network in 2016.

^{**} The Pitch was originally launched as an independent podcast in July 2015 and joined Gimlet in 2017. The show returned to independent production in 2022.

^{***} Story Pirates was originally launched independently in October 2013, later joining Gimlet in 2017.

=== Science Vs ===
In October 2015, it was announced that the podcast Science Vs, hosted by Australian science journalist Wendy Zukerman, would move to Gimlet Media after previously being produced by the Australian Broadcasting Corporation (ABC) as part of ABC Radio's First Run digital-first podcast program.

The program dissects fads that are framed as scientific facts.

=== Heavyweight ===
In September 2016, Gimlet released the first episode of the podcast Heavyweight with Jonathan Goldstein. The company describes the format as stories "about journeying back to the moment when everything went wrong".

Heavyweight was cancelled by Spotify in December 2023. Goldstein has stated he hopes to find another production partner to continue the podcast. Heavyweight relaunched in 2025 with Puskin Industries.

=== Crimetown ===
Crimetown, a documentary series "centered on organized crime" debuted in 2016. The first season focused on organized crime in Providence, Rhode Island. The show is hosted by Marc Smerling and Zac Stuart-Pontier. The two previously worked together on the HBO documentary series The Jinx and the documentary film Catfish.

Season two of Crimetown, which focuses on police corruption and brutality in 1970s Detroit, Michigan, began on October 2, 2018. Unlike season 1, it was released exclusively on Spotify.

=== Every Little Thing ===
Every Little Thing premiered on April 17, 2017, as the successor to Surprisingly Awesome. In finding a new host in former Science Friday producer Flora Lichtman, Gimlet decided that what they were creating was "a whole new thing" and decided to change the show's name to reflect that. Every Little Thing was cancelled and aired its final episode on October 11, 2022.

=== The Pitch ===
In June 2017, it was announced that the podcast The Pitch, hosted by Josh Muccio, would move to Gimlet Media after previously being produced independently. The Pitch returned to independent production in July 2022 following Muccio's buyback of the show from Spotify.

The program features entrepreneurs in need of venture funding as they pitch to a live panel of angel investors. It has been described as similar to ABC's hit TV series Shark Tank.

=== Mogul ===
Mogul is produced by Gimlet in collaboration with Loud Speakers Network and premiered on Spotify on April 27, 2017, with a general release via other channels on June 16, 2017. The series is a six-episode documentary podcast that tells the story of Violator's Chris Lighty and his career as a music executive. The last episode of season 1 was on September 28, 2017 and at age 53 on December 20, 2017, host Reggie Ossé passed away."

A second season of Mogul exploring the growth of Southern hip hop premiered on September 18, 2019, with new host Brandon Jenkins.

=== Uncivil ===
Hosted by journalists Jack Hitt and Chenjerai Kumanyika, Uncivil confronts the official version of the Civil War with previously-untold stories about covert operations, corruption, resistance, mutiny, counterfeiting, and more, looking to trace their effect to the modern political climate. The show debuted on October 4, 2017.

Uncivil's premiere episode "The Raid" won a 2017 Peabody Award for News, Radio, Podcast, and Public Service Programming. This was the first Peabody award for Gimlet Media.

=== Story Pirates ===
Hosted by the Story Pirates performance group, Story Pirates takes original stories submitted from kids and turns them into comedy shows. The Story Pirates crew includes actors, comedians, improvisers and musicians on a rotating basis. The show debuted on November 20, 2017.

=== Chompers ===
Hosted by Rachel Ward, Chompers is a twice daily show designed to help kids develop good tooth brushing habits. The show is designed to help kids brushing for the full two minutes that dentists recommend by integrating jokes, riddles, stories, fun facts, silly songs and more. Chompers is the first Gimlet-produced podcast that is directly integrated into an Amazon Alexa Skill. The show debuted on March 1, 2018.

=== Without Fail ===
Billed as Gimlet's first interview show, Without Fail features CEO Alex Blumberg interviewing new guests in each episode. Each episode includes a guest who has taken a big professional risk, with the interview discussing why and how that risk came to be. The first season debuted on October 1, 2018. Guests on the show included Sophia Amoruso, Andre Iguodala, and Andrew Mason.

=== Conviction ===
On February 4, 2019, Gimlet released the first season of its investigative true crime series Conviction. All seven episodes of the season were released together. Intended to focus on a new story each season, the first season is hosted by Saki Knafo and covers reporting he did involving a series of NYPD officers and some of the people they arrested. The first season was released in partnership with The New York Times Magazine and Type Investigations.

=== Motherhood Sessions ===
In April 2019, Gimlet released Motherhood Sessions, a show about the challenges and new experiences for mothers. The show is hosted by Alexandra Sacks, a psychiatrist who specializes in reproduction and family life. The show's topics include dealing with divorce, careers, a financial strain for new or expecting mothers.

=== The Two Princes ===
Gimlet released The Two Princes, described as an "LGBTQ fantasy project", on June 4, 2019. The scripted series was created by Kevin Christopher Snipes, directed by Mimi O'Donnell, and features characters voiced by Noah Galvin, Ari'el Stachel, Christine Baranski, Shohreh Aghdashloo, Samira Wiley, and Matthew Rhys.

The Journal.

In June 2019, Gimlet released The Journal., a business podcast in co-production with The Wall Street Journal.

=== Motherhacker ===
In November 2019, Gimlet released Motherhacker. The scripted series is written by Sandi Farkas and executive produced and directed by Amanda Lipitz. The series focuses on Bridget, a stay at home mother with a husband in rehab, who begins vishing over the phone for a sketchy identity theft company to make ends meet. The show released its second season in June 2021, but was not renewed for further seasons.

=== The Scaredy Cats Horror Show ===
In May 2020, Reply All co-hosts launched a new spin-off podcast where an avowed horror film fan, Alex Goldman, screens a scary movie for his cohost PJ Vogt, a noted "scaredy cat", with the desire to learn if someone can learn to enjoy fear.

=== Resistance ===
In October 2020, Gimlet released Resistance, with Saidu Tejan-Thomas Jr. as its host. According to Gimlet, it is "a show about refusing to accept things as they are. Stories from the front lines of the movement for Black lives, told by the generation fighting for change."

=== Reply All ===
On November 24, 2014, Gimlet's second show, Reply All, made its debut. Billed as "a show about the internet", Reply All was hosted by Alex Goldman and Emmanuel Dzotsi and formerly by PJ Vogt. Vogt and Goldman previously worked on WNYC's On The Media before creating and hosting the technology and culture podcast TLDR.

In February 2017, Variety reported that Richard Linklater was attached to direct a movie based on the Reply All episode "Man of the People". The film, which as of August 2017, remains untitled, cast Robert Downey Jr. as John Brinkley, and was to be produced by Annapurna Pictures and Team Downey. In addition to Linklater and Downey, three members of the Reply All team signed on as co-producers, including PJ Vogt, Tim Howard, and Chris Giliberti.

In October 2020, Emmanuel Dzotsi joined as the third co-host.

In February 2021, former Gimlet producer Eric Eddings revealed in a Twitter thread that Vogt and Reply All producer Sruthi Pinnamaneni had opposed staff unionization efforts and contributed to a "toxic culture" at the show, particularly for staffers of color. Vogt and Pinnamaneni apologized and both later left the show. Goldman and Dzotsi continued the show together before deciding to end it in 2022, and a final regular episode was released on June 23.

=== Mystery Show ===
Mystery Show, Gimlet's third show, was launched on May 22, 2015. The show featured host Starlee Kine solving mysteries that could not be solved by using the Internet, brought to her by listeners and friends. The mysteries tended to deal with missing objects, people, or other day-to-day questions.

The final episode of Mystery Show's first season was released in July 2015. On October 6, 2016, Alex Blumberg announced on an episode of StartUp that Mystery Show had been canceled.

=== Sampler ===
In January 2016, Gimlet launched the podcast Sampler, hosted by Brittany Luse, which, according to the producers, was "devoted to bringing you the best moments from the world of podcasting" by presenting excerpts from other, non-Gimlet podcasts and interviewing their makers. On October 17, 2016, Blumberg and Luse announced on the Sampler season finale that the podcast had been canceled.

=== Undone ===
In November 2016, Gimlet described their new documentary series Undone as a show about "the things that happened when you weren't looking." It was hosted by Pat Walters, who had previously been a producer for Radiolab. During the show's season finale, Walters announced that Undone would not be returning for another season.

=== Surprisingly Awesome ===
Gimlet launched Surprisingly Awesome, originally featuring Adam Davidson and Adam McKay, on November 3, 2015. Producer Rachel Ward filled in for Davidson or McKay throughout season 1 when one or both were unavailable. On October 5, 2016, Ward announced that Davidson and McKay had left the podcast. In episode 23, on January 19, 2017, Ward announced that she would be moving on to another Gimlet project and the show was then replaced by Flora Lichtman's Every Little Thing.

The premise of the show was to take seemingly uninteresting topics and, by exploring their stories, show that they are actually of interest.

=== Twice Removed ===
Twice Removed was a family history podcast, which Gimlet claimed aimed to prove "we're one big family." The show was announced on December 5, with the first season debuting on December 16, 2016. Featured individuals included Abbi Jacobson of Broad City, Ted Allen of the Food Network, and writer Dan Savage. On June 16, 2017, Gimlet announced that no new episodes would be produced beyond a series finale released that same day.

=== StartUp ===
StartUp's first episode aired on September 5, 2014, and was hosted by Alex Blumberg. Through documentary-style storytelling, the podcast shares Blumberg's experience building Gimlet Media from an idea through to a startup business. In episode 12 of season 1, Blumberg announced his new co-host, Lisa Chow. The podcast has won a Gracie Award as well as a Gerald Loeb Award for Distinguished Business and Financial Journalism.

While the initial podcast subject of the development of Gimlet Media is routinely addressed, subsequent seasons have featured an array of different startups and business personalities, including American Apparel founder Dov Charney, venture capitalist Arlan Hamilton, a church plant applying business practices to the non profit sector, and the rise of Success Academy Charter Schools among others.

The final season of Startup covered the process of Gimlet's acquisition by Spotify and the podcast formally concluded with its final regular episode on October 18, 2019.

Alex, Inc., a TV sitcom based on Blumberg, StartUp, and Gimlet Media, debuted on ABC on March 28, 2018.

=== The Nod ===
The Nod was a culture podcast designed to "gleefully explore all the beautiful, complicated dimensions of Black life." Anchored by Mogul producer Eric Eddings and former Sampler host Brittany Luse, The Nod premiered in July 2017, supplanting their former self-produced For Colored Nerds podcast. The Nod ended in early 2020 due to Eddings and Luse moving to a new daily short form show on Quibi also entitled The Nod.

=== The Cut on Tuesdays ===
A co-production with New York Magazine, The Cut on Tuesdays featured journalist Molly Fischer discussing current events including politics, fashion, and pop culture. The show was intended to be "the premier destination for dynamic conversations about issues that matter to women". The show debuted on October 16, 2018, and ended in December 2019.

=== Limited-run shows ===
The following series were launched as a limited number of episodes.

Title	Host(s)	Genre	No. of episodes	First episode	Last episode
Homecoming	Catherine Keener, Oscar Isaac, David Schwimmer	Radio drama	12	November 16, 2016	August 23, 2017*
Sandra	Alia Shawkat, Kristen Wiig	Radio drama	7	April 18, 2018	April 18, 2018**
The Habitat	Lynn Levy	Documentary	7	April 18, 2018	April 18, 2018**
We Came To Win	Nando Vila	Documentary	10	April 25, 2018	June 15, 2018
The Horror of Dolores Roach	Daphne Rubin-Vega, Bobby Cannavale	Radio drama	13	October 17, 2018	October 16, 2019**
The Clearing	Josh Dean, April Balascio	True crime documentary	8	July 18, 2019	August 29, 2019

* Season 1 of Homecoming ran weekly from November 16 to December 21, 2016. Season 2 began on July 19 and wrapped up on August 23, 2017.

** All episodes of Sandra, The Habitat, and The Horror of Dolores Roach were each released as complete series on the same day to promote binge listening.

==== Homecoming ====
Homecoming, announced in November 2016, is Gimlet's first fictional podcast. It is a psychological thriller starring Catherine Keener, David Schwimmer, and Oscar Isaac. Season two began on July 19, 2017, and ran for six episodes.

In December 2016, Universal Cable Productions purchased the rights to produce Homecoming as a TV series. Amazon gave the show a two-season order. In July 2017, Variety reported that Julia Roberts was set to star in the series, replacing Keener's role from the podcast. The show's first season, starring Roberts, Bobby Cannavale, Stephan James, Shea Whigham, Alex Karpovsky, and Sissy Spacek, premiered on Amazon Video on November 2, 2018. Sam Esmail, who created Mr. Robot, produced and directed the show. The podcast's original staff, including Eli Horowitz and Micah Bloomberg, as well as other Gimlet staff members, assisted in writing and producing the show. A second season of the TV series premiered on May 22, 2020, following a new story inspired by the podcast but going into a new direction.

==== Sandra ====
Sandra is Gimlet's second fictional podcast. The show follows the character Helen (voiced by Alia Shawkat), who lands a job at the company that makes Sandra (voiced by Kristen Wiig), a popular Artificial Intelligence product. "But working behind the curtain isn't quite the escape from reality that Helen expected." Sandra debuted on April 18, 2018.

==== The Habitat ====
Hosted by Lynn Levy, The Habitat follows the crew of a simulated Mars Mission crew isolated in the HI-SEAS habitat on the Hawaiian islands for a full year. The series documents the six person crew of HI-SEAS IV "from the moment they set foot in their habitat, communicating with them through audio diaries that detail their discoveries, their frustrations, and their evolving and devolving relationships with each other." The Habitat debuted on April 18, 2018.

==== We Came to Win ====
Hosted by Nando Vila, We Came to Win is Gimlet's first sports podcast. The show focuses on world of soccer and the FIFA World Cup. It debuted on April 25, 2018.

==== The Horror of Dolores Roach ====
A scripted fiction horror podcast, The Horror of Dolores Roach follows the titular character after her release from prison as she attempts to reintegrate to her old neighborhood. The show stars Daphne Rubin-Vega as Dolores Roach and Bobby Cannavale as an old friend she reunites with. Other voices include Abigail Spencer, David Zayas, John Douglas Thompson, Margaret Cho, and Richard Kind. The first season consists of eight episodes, and was first released on October 17, 2018, and a second season was released on October 16, 2019.

A television series adaptation of the same name is in works in partnership with Amazon and Blumhouse Productions. The project had given a series order in February 2022, with Justina Machado will star.

The Clearing

Hosted by Josh Dean, The Clearing explores April Balascio father, serial murderer Edward Wayne Edwards, and investigates her father's history and potential additional unsolved crimes he may have committed. The Clearing is a co-production with Pineapple Street Media.

== Gimlet Creative ==
In 2016, Gimlet launched Gimlet Creative, the company's branded podcast division. Gimlet Creative works with sponsors to create podcasts that are then released under Gimlet Creative's channel, with a clear distinction drawn to separate from the company's editorial and journalism shows. Branded podcasts from Gimlet Creative include:

- Open for Business, with eBay
- DTR, with Tinder
- The Venture, with Virgin Atlantic
- .future (pronounced "dot future"), with Microsoft
- The Secret to Victory, with Gatorade
- Why We Eat What We Eat, with Blue Apron
- Fortune Favors the Bold with MasterCard
- Flipping the Game with Reebok
- Casting Call with Squarespace
- Pick Me Up with Lyft
- Earning Curve with Interac
- Wireframe with Adobe
- Dress Codes with New Balance

In addition to individual shows, Gimlet Creative also produced the in house ads featured on other Gimlet podcasts.

== Gimlet Pictures ==
Gimlet Pictures was created in 2017 as a new business group of Gimlet Media, specifically focusing on adaptation of Gimlet's Podcast content into Television, Movies, and other visual platforms. The explosive growth of podcasts as a medium has created opportunities to adapt and license that content for other platforms.

== GimletFest ==
In 2018, Gimlet announced their creation of a festival, called GimletFest. GimletFest took place on June 16–17 in Brooklyn, New York, and featured live podcast shows and panels with podcast hosts.

== See also ==
- List of podcasting companies
