= List of 2003 This American Life episodes =

In 2003, there were 28 This American Life episodes.

- Episode 228 – "You Are So Beautiful... To Me"
  - Act 1: Polly Wants More Than a Cracker – Veronica Chater
  - Act 2: On the Border Between Good and Bad – Russell Banks
- Episode 229 – "Secret Government"
  - Act 1: Until the End of the War – Jack Hitt
  - Act 2: Secret Trials and Secret Deportations – David Kestenbaum
  - Act 3: Secret Wiretaps from a Secret Court – Blue Chevigny
- Episode 230 – "Come Back to Afghanistan"
  - Susan Burton and Hyder Akbar won the Third Coast Festival Silver Award for Best Documentary for this episode
  - Act 1: Teenage Embed – Hyder Akbar and Susan Burton
- Episode 231 – "Time to Save the World"
  - Act 1: The Rundown – Starlee Kine
  - Act 2: Heather Help Me – Jessica Riddle
  - Act 3: Fools Rush In, Where Mommies Fear to Tread
  - Act 4: The Science of Good and Evil – Susan Drury
- Episode 232 – "The Real Story"
  - Act 1: Jarhead – Anthony Swofford
  - Act 2: What's the Truth Good For, Anyway? – Ira Glass
  - Act 3: Jar Jar Head – John Hodgman
- Episode 233 – "Starting from Scratch"
  - Act 1: Puppy Love – Molly FitzSimons
  - Act 2: Making Money the Old Fashioned Way – Mary Beth Kirshner
  - Act 3: The First Starting from Scratch – Jonathan Goldstein
- Episode 234 – "Say Anything"
  - Act 1: How to Write a Note – Jake Warga
  - Act 2: The Battle of Words vs Fear – Michael Bernard Loggins
  - Act 3: When a City Opens its Big Mouth
  - Act 4: Wedding Bells and Door Bells – Elizabeth Gilbert and Jonathan Goldstein
- Episode 235 – "The Balloon Goes Up"
  - Act 1: Bombs over Baghdad – Ira Glass
  - Act 2: Tice Ridley is a first Lieutenant in the Army
  - Act 3: What's French for French Fries? – David Sedaris
  - Act 4: Fighting the Previous War – Sarah Vowell
  - Act 5: What Peacetime Forgets about Wartime – Lee Sandlin
  - Act 6: Lessons from Ancient Wars – Mary Zimmerman and Ira Glass
- Episode 236 – "My Two Cents"
  - Act 1: Dave Knows – Susan Drury
  - Act 2: Stock Making Sense – Alex Blumberg
  - Act 3: A View from the Mop – Greg Tate
- Episode 237 – "Regime Change"
  - Act 1: Unconquerable – Katie Davis
  - Act 2: Or Give Me Death – Sarah Koenig
  - Act 3: The Heart is a Lonely Junta – Ira Glass and Jeffrey Brown
- Episode 238 – "Lost in Translation"
  - Act 1: The Chasm Between Comedy and Music – Jonathan Goldstein and Starlee Kine
  - Act 2: Star of Bethlehem – Nancy Updike
  - Act 3: Translating for the Very, Very, Very, Very Tall – Jesse Hardman
- Episode 239 – "Lost in America"
  - Act 1: Losing It – Jonathan Goldstein
  - Act 2: Teacher Hit Me With a Ruler – Sarah Vowell
  - Act 3: I Found Your Letter – Davy Rothbart
- Episode 240 – "I'm In Charge Now"
  - Act 1: It's Not Just the Aces That Are Wild – David Sedaris
  - Act 2: Playing Clinton in the Bush Leagues – Katy Vine
  - Act 3: You Talkin' to Me? – Adam Davidson
- Episode 241 – "20 Acts in 60 Minutes"
  - Act 1: Don't I Know You? – Tate Donovan and Starlee Kine
  - Act 2: No of Course I Know You – Scott Carrier
  - Act 3: It's Commerce that Brings Us Together – Susan Drury
  - Act 4: The Sound of One Hand Waving – Patty Martin
  - Act 5: The Sound of No Hands Clapping – Viki Merrick, Eric Kipp, and Jay Allison
  - Act 6: Reaching Out with Radio – "Joey" and "Jake" with Blunt Youth Radio Project
  - Act 7: Up Where the Air is Clear – Jonathan Goldstein
  - Act 8: The Greatest Dog Name in the World – Valion Loetz, Paris Loetz and Katie Adone
  - Act 9: Of Dogs and Men – Elaine Boehm and Jim Sultzer
  - Act 10: Untitled – Neo-Futurists
  - Act 11: Etiquette Lesson – David Sedaris
  - Act 12: To Tell the Truth – Brent Runyon
  - Act 13: More Lies – Catharyn and Ira Glass
  - Act 14: Call in Colonel Mustard or That's What Happens when you Don't Use a Condoment Kids – Ira Glass
  - Act 15: Mr. Prediction – David Rakoff
  - Act 16: That One Guy at the Office – ?Drewdanna Gustafson?
  - Act 17: You Can't Choose Your Gift – ?Richard Carry? and Jim Sultzer
  - Act 18: Party Talk – Chuck Klosterman
  - Act 19: The Hard Life at the Top – David Lipsky
  - Act 20: The Greatest Moment I Saw On Stage – Ira Glass
- Episode 242 – "Enemy Camp"
  - Act 1: Confession – Carl Marziali
  - Act 2: Blood Agent – Ira Glass
  - Act 3: And I Love Her – Etgar Keret
  - Act 4: Yet another ineffective road map for world leadership – Blue Chevigny
- Episode 243 – "Later That Same Day"
  - Act 1: The Hiker and the Cowman Should be Friends – Scott Carrier
  - Act 2: Scrapbook, the Verb
  - Act 3: Slingshot – John Hodgman
- Episode 244 – "MacGyver"
  - Act 1: Bolt of Lightning, Pro and Con – Ira Glass
  - Act 2: Files in Cakes, Ha! – Angelo
  - Act 3: So Crazy It Just Might Work – Elizabeth Gilbert
  - Act 4: A Girl's Guide to Mending the Unmendable – Susan Burton
- Episode 245 – "Allure of the Mean Friend"
  - Act 1: Return to the Scene of the Crime – Jonathan Goldstein
  - Act 2: Does Niceness Pay? – Ira Glass
  - Act 3: And What's Going on With You? – Mike Albo and Virginia Heffernan
  - Act 4: Keeping It in the Family – Bernard Cooper
- Episode 246 – "My Pen Pal"
  - Act 1: Who Put the "Pistol" in "Epistolary"? – Ira Glass
  - Act 2: Pen Pal Husband – Janice Powell
- Episode 247 – "What Is This Thing?"
  - Act 1: Inside the Romance Industry – Robin Epstein
  - Act 2: View from the Other Half – Griffin Hansbury
  - Act 3: A Love Story – Sarah Vowell
- Episode 248 – "Like It Or Not"
  - Prologue – David Rakoff
  - Act 1: If It Drives, Go Live – Starlee Kine follows up on a 2001 low speed car chase in Los Angeles
  - Act 2: Don't Just Stand There – Sheila Peabody
  - Act 3: Hello, Baby – David Rakoff
  - Act 4: On the Eighth Day, God Created Tartar Sauce – Curtis Sittenfeld on a Mobile Bay jubilee
- Episode 249 – "Garbage"
  - Act 1: Oh, Mr. San Man – Ira Glass
  - Act 2: Except for the Smell, I Think I Have a Crush on You – Luis Urrea
  - Act 3: "I'm a Legitimate Businessman ... Waste Management."
- Episode 250 – "The Annoying Gap Between Theory and Practice"
  - Act 1: Rock, Paper, Computer – Jack Hitt
  - Act 2: Detroit Is In the House – Alex Blumberg
  - Act 3: Zero Divided By Zero Is Still Zero – Adrian Nicole LeBlanc
- Episode 251 – "Brother's Keeper"
  - Act 1: Whatever Happened to Baby Cain? – Jonathan Goldstein
  - Act 2: This Land is Your Land, This Land Is My Land – Nancy Updike
  - Act 3: Neighbor's Keeper – Robert Kurson
- Episode 252 – "Poultry Slam '03"
  - Act 1: Duki
  - Act 2: Winged Warrior
  - Act 3: Chicken Diva – Jack Hitt
  - Act 4: Trying to Respect the Chicken – Ira Glass
- Episode 253 – "The Middle of Nowhere"
  - Act 1: No Island Is An Island – Jack Hitt
  - Act 2: On Hold, No One Can Hear You Scream – Julie Snyder
- Episode 254 – "Teenage Embed, Part Two"
  - Act 1: Part One – Hyder Akbar
  - Act 2: Part Two – Hyder Akbar
- Episode 255 – "This American Life's Holiday Gift-Giving Guide"
  - Act 1: Make a Joyous Noise Unto Your Mom – Ian Brown
  - Act 2: A Christmas Memory
  - Act 3: Secret Santa – Caitlin Shetterly
