= List of 2002 This American Life episodes =

In 2002, there were 25 This American Life episodes.

- Episode 203 – "Recordings for Someone"
  - Act 1: Love Story – Ira Glass
  - Act 2: War Story – John Brasfield
  - Act 3: Special Effects Story – Kevin Murphy
  - Act 4: Buddy Picture – Jonathan Goldstein
- Episode 204 – "81 Words"
  - Show description: Devoted entirely to Alix Spiegel's feature on the removal of homosexuality as a form of mental illness from the DSM-II during the 1973 meeting of the APA. Spiegel won the 2002 Livingston Award for National Reporting for this episode.
  - Act 1: Untitled – Alix Spiegel
  - Act 2: Untitled – Alix Spiegel
- Episode 205 – "Plan B"
  - Act 1: It's Another Tequila Sunrise – John Hodgman
  - Act 2: Why Talk? – Starlee Kine
  - Act 3: Kidnapping as Plan B – Ira Glass
  - Act 4: A Fate Most of Us Fear – Jonathan Goldstein
  - Act 5: The Accursed Items – J. Robert Lennon
- Episode 206 – "Somewhere in the Arabian Sea"
  - Act 1: Untitled – Wendy Dorr, Alex Blumberg and Ira Glass
- Episode 207 – "Special Ed"
  - Act 1: Get on the Mic – Ira Glass
  - Act 2: Black Hole Son
  - Act 3: Walkout – Veronica Chater
- Episode 208 – "Office Politics"
  - Act 1: Hang In There Kitty Cat, It's Almost Friday – Starlee Kine
  - Act 2: Sheetcakes in the Conference Room, Whiskey After Dark – David Rakoff
  - Act 3: When the Job That Takes You Off the Streets Is On The Streets – Julie Snyder
    - A story about the culture and politics of street vendors and panhandlers in New York City
- Episode 209 – "Didn't Ask to Be Born"
  - Act 1: The chronicle of a family that unravelled – Debra Gwartney and Sandy Tolan
  - Act 2: Untitled – Brent Runyon
- Episode 210 – "Perfect Evidence"
  - Act 1: Hawks and Rabbits – Shane DuBow
  - Act 2: Snitch
- Episode 211 – "Naming Names"
  - Act 1: How Britain Nearly Saved America – Jon Ronson
  - Act 2: One Crucible Leads to Another – Elia Kazan and Arthur Miller
  - Act 3: Beating the Erasers – Susan Drury
- Episode 212 – "The Other Man"
  - Act 1: Psychic Buddha, Qu'est-ce Que C'est – Davy Rothbart
  - Act 2: The Jackson Two – Ira Glass
  - Act 3: Mr. Fun – Jonathan Goldstein and Heather O'Neill
- Episode 213 – "Devil On My Shoulder"
  - Act 1: It's Fun to Make Hell on Earth – George Ratliff
  - Act 2: Sixteen Candles Can Lead to a Lot of Fire – Ira Glass
  - Act 3: Devil in Angel's Clothing, or Is It the Other Way Around? – Sarah Koenig
- Episode 214 – "Family Physics"
  - Act 1: Occam's Razor – Cris Beam
  - Act 2: The Trajectory and Force of Bodies in Orbit – Jon Ronson
  - Act 3: Conservation of Energy and Matter – David Sedaris
- Episode 215 – "Ask An Expert"
  - Act 1: An Epidemic Created by Doctors – Alix Spiegel
  - Act 2: Not Stella Adler, Just Stellllaaah – Jod Kaftan
- Episode 216 – "Give the People What They Want"
  - Act 1: Let Them Eat Cake, Wedding Cake – Ira Glass
  - Act 2: God Shed his Grace on Thee – Jack Hitt
  - Act 3: Have Paint, Will Travel – Alex Kotlowitz and Amy Dorn
  - Act 4: Handing People Their Dreams – Ali Davis
  - Act 5: What Daddy Wants – Curtis Sittenfeld
- Episode 217 – "Give It to Them"
  - Act 1: Life Indoors – Nancy Updike
  - Act 2: Here and There in the Land of Israel – Ira Glass
  - Act 3: What's a Moderate? – Nancy Updike
- Episode 218 – "Act V"
  - Act 1: Act Five, Scene 1 – Jack Hitt
  - Act 2: Act Five, Scene 2 – Jack Hitt
- Episode 219 – "High Speed Chase"
  - Act 1: Cowboys and Indians, Part 1 – Susan Burton
  - Act 2: Cowboys and Indians, Part 2 – Susan Burton
- Episode 220 – "Testosterone"
  - Act 1: Life at Zero – Ira Glass
  - Act 2: Infinite Gent
  - Act 3: Contest-osterone
  - Act 4: Learning to Shut Up – Miriam Toews
- Episode 221 – "Fake I.D."
  - Act 1: Pole Vault – Ira Glass
  - Act 2: This Blessed House – Jhumpa Lahiri
  - Act 3: The Lie that Binds – David Sedaris
- Episode 222 – "Suckers"
  - Act 1: No Receipt, No Surrender – "Jen"
  - Act 2: The Stereo Type – Shane DuBow
  - Act 3: Suckers in the Promised Land – Adam Davidson
  - Act 4: Mother Sucker – Heather O'Neill
- Episode 223 – "Classifieds"
  - Centered on classified ads appearing on the same day in the Chicago Sun-Times and the Chicago Reader
  - Act 1: Lost and Found Ads – Todd Bachmann
  - Act 2: Help Wanted – Joe Richman
  - Act 3: Musicians Classifieds – Starlee Kine
  - Act 4: Personal Ads – Jonathan Goldstein
  - Act 5: For Sale – Jay Allison
- Episode 224 – "Middlemen"
  - Act 1: Show Me the Monet – Alex Blumberg and Davy Rothbart
  - Act 2: Stuck inside of Memphis
  - Act 3: What it Takes to Tromp Through the Desert – Wendy Dorr
- Episode 225 – "Home Movies"
  - Act 1: The Big Night – Jonathan Goldstein
  - Act 2: The Kids Stay in the Picture – Ira Glass
  - Act 3: A Half-Million Home Videos Can't be Wrong – Ira Glass
  - Act 4: The Cinema of Upward Mobility – Susan Burton
  - Act 5: Untitled – David Sedaris
- Episode 226 – "Reruns"
  - Act 1: Action! Action! Action! – Starlee Kine talks about Trent Harris' Beaver Trilogy
  - Act 2: Marriage as Rerun, featuring John Hodgman and Robert Krulwich – Ira Glass
  - Act 3: Reruns at the back of the Bus – Sarah Vowell
- Episode 227 – "Why We Fight"
  - Act 1: Senator's Proxy – Ira Glass
  - Act 2: When Firas Comes Marching Home Again – Adam Davidson
  - Act 3: Realism 101 – Ira Glass
  - Act 4: Who Cares?
