= List of 2004 This American Life episodes =

In 2004, there were 24 This American Life episodes.

- Episode 256 – "Living Without"
  - Act 1: Do You Hear What I Hear? – Nubar Alexanian
  - Act 2: The Journalism of Deprivation – Sarah Vowell
  - Act 3: The Call of the Great Indoors – Chelsea Merz
  - Act 4: Tin Man – Judith Budnitz
- Episode 257 – "What I Should've Said"
  - Act 1: Freeze Frame – Jonathan Goldstein
  - Act 2: In the Bush Leagues – Charles Monroe-Kane
  - Act 3: A Can of Worms – David Sedaris
  - Act 4: Life Sentence – Mike Miller
- Episode 258 – "Leaving the Fold"
  - Act 1: I've Got a Secret I've Been Hiding From You – Alex Blumberg
  - Act 2: God and Hockey – Ira Glass
  - Act 3: Nuns Amok – Susan Drury
- Episode 259 – "Promised Land"
  - Act 1: Across the Street from Heaven – Starlee Kine
  - Act 2: Life in the Fast Lane – David Rakoff
  - Act 3: Mystery Train – Hillary Frank
- Episode 260 – "The Facts Don't Matter"
  - Act 1: Straight Eyes on the Quirin Guys – Chris Neary
  - Act 2: Mush Polling – Sarah Koenig
- Episode 261 – "The Sanctity of Marriage"
  - Act 1: What Really Happens in Marriage – Ira Glass
  - Act 2: The Defense of Marriage Act – Adam Felber
  - Act 3: I Want to be a Statistic – Starlee Kine
- Episode 262 – "Miracle Cures"
  - Act 1: Changing the Channeler – Davy Rothbart
  - Act 2: The Entities Known as The Food and Drug Administration – Ira Glass
- Episode 263 – "Desperate Measures"
  - Act 1: Hasta La Vista, Arnie – Scott Miller
  - Act 2: We Built This City on Rock and Coal – Ira Glass
  - Act 3: The Router Less Taken
  - Act 4: The Rocks at Rock Bottom – Hillary Frank
- Episode 264 – "Special Treatment"
  - Show description: On the ethics and reality of preferential treatment
  - Act 1: Lunchtime with the King of Ketchup – Jonathan Goldstein
  - Act 2: Except for that One Problem, it's Perfect – Gregory Warner
  - Act 3: Mommie's Psychic Helper – Aimee Phan
  - Act 4: The Way to a Boy's Heart Is Through His Stomach – Lisa Carver
- Episode 265 – "Fake Science"
  - Show description: On cranks, distortions of science, and the application of pseudo-scientific methods to questions outside the realm of science
  - Act 1: Spook Science – Jake Warga
  - Act 2: Government Science – Alex Blumberg
  - Act 3: Beauty Science – Adam Sternbergh
  - Act 4: Radio Science – Brent Runyon
- Episode 266 – "I'm From the Private Sector and I'm Here to Help"
  - Show description: On the work of private defense contractors in post-invasion Iraq
  - Act 1: Airport – Nancy Updike
  - Act 2: Hank – Nancy Updike
  - Act 3: Green Zone – Nancy Updike
  - Act 4: Electricity – Nancy Updike
  - Act 5: Karen – Nancy Updike
  - Act 6: Cops – Nancy Updike
  - Act 7: Hank Redux – Nancy Updike
- Episode 267 – "Propriety"
  - Show description: On civility, profanity, and the Federal Communications Commission
  - Act 1: Government Says the Darnedest Things – Ira Glass
  - Act 2: Dems Gone Wild! – Ken Kurson
  - Act 3: Swiss Near-Miss – Samantha Hunt
- Episode 268 – "My Experimental Phase"
  - Act 1: That's Funny, You Don't Look Jewish – David Segal
  - Act 2: Miami Vices – Sascha Rothchild, Mortified
- Episode 269 – "Someone to Watch Over Me"
  - Act 1: Doctoring the Doctor – Jo Giese
  - Act 2: The Over-Protective Kind
  - Act 3: Are You a Man or a Mouse? – Aimee Bender
- Episode 270 – "Family Legend"
  - Act 1: Take My Cheese, Please – Ira Glass
  - Act 2: We Don't Talk About That – Kevin O'Leary
  - Act 3: Admissions – Katia Dunn
- Episode 271 – "Best Interests"
  - Act 1: I'd Rather Not – Ira Glass
  - Act 2: Exodus of One – Alex Kotlowitz
- Episode 272 – "Big Tent"
  - Show description: On the Republican Party during the campaign season preceding the U.S. presidential election, 2004
  - Act 1: Pink Elephant – Patrick Howell
  - Act 2: Right and Righter – Alex Blumberg
  - Act 3: Indecent Proposal – Shane DuBow
  - Act 4: It's My Party
- Episode 273 – "Put Your Heart In It"
  - Show description: On motivation and passion, especially regarding career choices
  - Act 1: Farm Eye for the Farm Guy – George DeVault
  - Act 2: Diary of a Long-shot – Teal Krech
  - Act 3: Contrails of My Tears – Brett Martin
- Episode 274 – "Enemy Camp '04"
  - Show description: On the Iraq war and the war on terrorism (a discussion with James Fallows and Richard Perle), the Roman Catholic Church sex abuse scandal, and parasites
  - Act 1: Our Own Worst Enemy? – Ira Glass
  - Act 2: Confession – Carl Marziali
  - Act 3: Blood Agent – Ira Glass
  - Act 4: And I Love Her – Etgar Keret
- Episode 275 – "Two Steps Back"
  - Show description: On the decline of Washington Irving Elementary School in Chicago, once a model for success in public education reforms
  - Act 1: 1994 – Ira Glass
  - Act 2: 2004 – Ira Glass
- Episode 276 – "Swing Set"
  - Show description: On swing voters, who were thought to play an important role in the U.S. presidential election, 2004, which took place a few days after the episode first aired
  - Act 1: My Buddy, Hackett – Ira Glass
  - Act 2: Cold-Cock the Vote – Jack Hitt
  - Act 3: One Son, One Vote – Sarah Koenig
  - Act 4: He's Got Legs – Lisa Pollak
- Episode 277 – "Apology"
  - Show description: On apologizing
  - Act 1: Repeat After Me – David Sedaris
  - Act 2: Dial "S" for Sorry – Ira Glass
  - Act 3: Two Words You Never Want to Hear From Your Doctor – Starlee Kine
- Episode 278 – "Spies Like Us"
  - Show description: On surveillance and eavesdropping by private citizens
  - Act 1: The Lobbyist – Burt Covit
  - Act 2: Life With the Haters – Beth Lisick
  - Act 3: Mystery Shoppers – Lisa Pollak
  - Act 4: Stop Bugging Me – Jane Feltes
- Episode 279 – "Auto Show"
  - Show description: On dB drag racing, vehicle theft, car salespeople, and elderly drivers
  - Act 1: Crunk in the Trunk – David Segal
  - Act 2: Baby You Can't Drive My Car – Jamie Kitman
  - Act 3: Objects in the Rear View Mirror May Be Alarmingly Familiar – Curtis Sittenfeld
  - Act 4: Not Your Father's Chevrolet Salesman – Sarah Koenig
  - Act 5: End of the Road – Lisa Pollack
