= List of 2001 This American Life episodes =

In 2001, there were 28 This American Life episodes.

- Episode 175 – "Babysitting"
  - Act 1: What Big Teeth You Have – Hillary Frank
  - Act 2: In the Event of an Emergency, Put Your Sister in an Upright Position – Susan Burton
  - Act 3: Yes There Is A Baby – Ira Glass
    - For their segment Yes There Is A Baby Jonathan Goldstein, Alex Blumberg and Ira Glass won the 2002 Third Coast International Audio Festival Gold Award for Best Documentary
- Episode 176 – "Two Nations, One President"
- Episode 177 – "American Limbo"
  - Act 1: The Family That Flees Together, Trees Together – Alex Blumberg
  - Act 2: What's French for 'Strike Three'? – Adam Gopnik
  - Act 3: It's Julie Andrews' World, Sylvia Just Lives In It – Sylvia Lemus and Ira Glass
- Episode 178 – "Superpowers"
  - Act 1: Invisible Man vs. Hawkman – John Hodgman
  - Act 2: Wonder Woman – Kelly McEvers
  - Act 3: The Green Team of Boy Millionaires, Beppo The Amazing Supermonkey from Planet Krypton, and The Man from Sram – Ira Glass and Jonathan Morris
  - Act 4: The Wonder Twins – Ira Glass and Jason Bleibtreu
- Episode 179 – "Cicero"
  - Act 1: Untouchables
  - Act 2: The Inevitable
  - Act 3: War By Other Means
  - Act 4: They Say Our Love is Here to Stay
- Episode 180 – "Return to Childhood"
  - Act 1: Once More, With Feeling – Jonathan Katz
  - Act 2: Punk in a Grey Flannel Suit – David Philp
  - Act 3: Ich... Bin... Ein .. Mophead – Alex Blumberg
  - Act 4: Every Day I Forget Something Else – Nicholson Baker
- Episode 181 – "The Friendly Man"
  - Act 1: The Test – Scott Carrier
  - Act 2: The Friendly Man – Scott Carrier
  - Act 3: Who Am I? What Am I Doing Here? – Scott Carrier
  - Act 4: The Day Mom and Dad Fell in Love – Scott Carrier
- Episode 182 – "Cringe"
  - Act 1: What We Cringe About When We Cringe About Love – Nancy Updike
  - Act 2: The Growing Aesthetic of Cringe – Adam Sternberg
  - Act 3: M*A*S*H Notes – Ira Glass
  - Act 4: Cringe and Purge – Bruce Jay Friedman
- Episode 183 – "The Missing Parents Bureau"
  - Act 1: Better Left to the Imagination – Alix Spiegel
  - Act 2: Tell it to the Void – Miriam Toews
  - Act 3: I'm an Orphan; Don't Tell My Mom – Starlee Kine
  - Act 4: Runaway Mom – Dan Savage
- Episode 184 – "Neighbors"
  - Act 1: Mr. Rothbart's Neighborhood – Davy Rothbart
  - Music interlude: Bing Crosby, Dear Hearts and Gentle People
  - Act 2: The Girl Next Door – Cheryl Wagner
  - Act 3: The Ratman Cometh – Katie Davis
  - Music interlude: Big Mama Thornton, I Smell a Rat
  - Music interlude: Jonathan Richman and the Modern Lovers, New Kind of Neighborhood
- Episode 185 – "Golden Calf"
  - Act 1: Bowing Before the Famous – Ann Hepperman
  - Act 2: Thou Shalt Worship No Other Trousers Before Me – Ira Glass
  - Act 3: Don't Have a Golden Cow – Iggy Scam
- Episode 186 – "Prom"
  - For her segment Tornado Prom Susan Burton won the 2001 Third Coast International Audio Festival Best New Artist award
  - Act 1: Tornado Prom – Susan Burton
  - Act 2: Save the Last Dance for Me... Again – Ira Glass
  - Act 3: Only Two Things Are Certain in Life: Death and Tuxes
  - Act 4: Only One Thing Missing – Wendy Dorr – Prom in Racine, Wisconsin
- Episode 187 – "Father's Day '01"
  - Act 1: Driving the Divorcemobile
  - Act 2: And If That Diamond Ring Don't Shine – Ian Brown
  - Act 3: Legend of a Bankrobber's Son – Nick Flynn
- Episode 188 – "Kid Logic"
  - Act 1: Baby Scientists with Faulty Data
  - Act 2: The Game Ain't Over til the Fatso Man Sings – Howie Chackowicz
  - Act 3: Werewolves in Their Youth – Michael Chabon
  - Act 4: One Brain Shrinks, Another Brain Grows – Julie Hill
- Episode 189 – "Hitler's Yacht"
  - Act 1: Part One – Alix Spiegel
  - Act 2: Part Two – Alix Spiegel
- Episode 190 – "Living the Dream"
  - Act 1: Girls Girls Girls – Cris Beam
  - Act 2: Agent to the Stars – John Hodgman
  - Act 3: Airel Sharon, Shimon Peres, David Ben Gurion, and Me! – Ira Glass and Adam Davidson
- Episode 191 – "I Know What You Did This Summer"
  - Act 1: Just Three Thousand More Miles to the Beach – Scott Carrier
  - Act 2: It's Not the Heat, It's the Humility – Jonathan Goldstein
  - Act 3: You Can Have Your Cave and Eat It Too – Sarah Vowell
- Episode 192 – "Meet the Pros"
  - Act 1: Crispy with the Rock – Joel Lovell
  - Act 2: Know When to Walk Away, Know When to Run – Ira Glass
  - Act 3: Martha My Dear – David Rakoff
- Episode 193 – "Stories of Loss"
  - Act 1: The Disappearance – Genevieve Jurgensen
  - Act 2: Look for the Union Label – Adrian LeBlanc
  - Act 3: Ashes – David Sedaris
- Episode 194 – "Before and After"
  - Act 1: In the After of Before and After – Lynn Simpson
  - Act 2: Watching from the River's Edge – David Rakoff
  - Act 3: Notes from the Underground – Haruki Murakami
  - Act 4: Far From Home – David Sedaris
  - Act 5: U.S.A., Me-S.A. – Ira Glass and Shirley Jahad
- Episode 195 – "War Stories"
  - Act 1: The Situation in the Field – Ira Glass and Tom Gjelten
  - Act 2: Letters to Home – Andrew Carroll and Estelle Lynch
  - Act 3: What Peacetime Forgets About Wartime – Lee Sandlin
  - Act 4: Are You Ready? – Scott Carrier
- Episode 196 – "Rashomon"
  - Act 1: 1001 Arabian Nightly Newscasts – Julie Snyder
  - Act 2: Bombs over Baghdad – Issam Shukri
  - Act 3: Toto, I don't Think We're in Vietnam Anymore – Alex Blumberg
- Episode 197 – "Before It Had a Name"
  - Act 1: Mr. Boder Vanishes – Carl Marziali
  - Act 2: Of Course I Remember Your Name – Heather O'Neill
  - Act 3: A Bad Day for Plates – Laura Tangusso
  - Act 4: You Call That Love? – Jonathan Goldstein
- Episode 198 – "How to Win Friends and Influence People"
  - Act 1: To Make a Friend, Be a Friend – David Sedaris
  - Act 2: Stay in Touch – Tami Sagher
  - Act 3: People Like You If You Put a Lot of Time Into Your Appearance – Luke Burbank
  - Act 4: Just Be Yourself – Jonathan Goldstein
- Episode 199 – "House on Loon Lake"
  - Act 1: Part One – Adam Beckman
  - Act 2: Part Two – Adam Beckman
- Episode 200 – "Hearts and Minds"
  - Act 1: Don't Believe Anything You Hear on the Radio – Nancy Updike
  - Act 2: Live on Stage by the Sword, Die on Stage by the Sword – Margy Rochlin
- Episode 201 – "Them"
  - Act 1: My Friend the Extremist – Jon Ronson
  - Act 2: Don't They Know It's Christmas After All – David Sedaris
  - Act 3: Newfies – Chris Brookes
- Episode 202 – "Faith"
  - Act 1: Adventures in Turning the Other Cheek – Ira Glass
  - Act 2: Does Size Matter If You're Talking About a Cross? – Josh Noel and Alex Blumberg
  - Act 3: The Epiphany Biz – Bill Lychak
  - Act 4: First Be Reconciled to Thy Brother, and Then Come and Offer Thy Gift – Susie Putz-Drury
