= Split =

Split(s) or The Split may refer to:

== Places ==
- Split, Croatia, the largest coastal city in Croatia
- Split Island, Canada, an island in the Hudson Bay
- Split Island, Falkland Islands
- Split Island, Fiji, better known as Hạfliua

== Arts, entertainment, and media ==
=== Films ===
- Split (1989 film), a science fiction film
- Split (2016 American film), a psychological horror thriller film
- Split (2016 Canadian film), also known as Écartée, a Canadian drama film directed by Lawrence Côté-Collins
- Split (2016 South Korean film), a sports drama film
- Split: A Divided America, a 2008 documentary on American politics
- The Split (film), a 1968 heist film
- The Split, or The Manster, a U.S.-Japanese horror film

=== Games ===
- Split (poker), the division of winnings in the card game
- Split (blackjack), a possible player decision in the card game
- Split (video game) (stylised as s.p.l.i.t), a 2025 horror video game

=== Music ===
==== Albums ====
- Split (The Groundhogs album), 1971
- Split (Lush album), 1994
- Split (Patricia Barber album), 1989
- The Split CD, a 1998 EP by Queens of the Stone Age and Beaver

==== Songs ====
- "Split" (KMFDM song), 1991
- "Split" (Tesla Boy song), from the album The Universe Made of Darkness
- "Split" (Yeat song), 2023
- "Split/Whole Time", a song from the Lil Yachty album Lil Boat 3
- "Split", by Jay Chou, from the 2002 album The Eight Dimensions
- "Split", by Willow, from the 2022 album Coping Mechanism

==== Other uses in music ====
- Split (composition), a 2015 orchestral composition by Andrew Norman
- Split album, an album by two or more artists

=== Television ===
- Split (TV series), an Israeli TV series
- The Split (TV series), a British TV series
- "Split" (Coupling), a 2002 episode

=== Other uses in arts, entertainment, and media ===
- Split (novel), a 2010 novel by Swati Avasthi
- Split (sculpture), a 2003 outdoor sculpture by Roxy Paine in Seattle, Washington, US
- Split Dynasty, an alien species of the X game series

== Naval vessels ==
- Yugoslav destroyer Split, decommissioned in 1980
- Yugoslav frigate Split, Koni-class

== Science and computing ==
- Split (graph theory)
- Split (mathematics), a property of an exact sequence
- Split Lie algebra
- Split (phylogenetics), a bipartition of a set of taxa in phylogenetics
- split (Unix), a Unix software utility (command) for dividing input into multiple files

== Sport and dance ==
- Split (bowling)
- Split (gymnastics), a body position often called the splits
- Split jump, a type of jump in figure skating
- Split leap or jumping, a class of dance leaps
- The split, two organisational fractures that occurred in American open-wheel car racing in 1979-1981 and 1996-2007

== Other uses ==
- Split (bottle size), a wine bottle size
- Split (divorce)
- Australian Labor Party split of 1955, or the Split
- Area code split, in telecommunications
- Stock split, a corporation dividing or consolidating its shares
- Split time, elapsed time between two points

== See also ==
- Banana split, a dessert
- Split system, a type of air conditioning system consisting of both indoor and outdoor units
- Phonemic split, an evolutionary change of a language in which one phoneme evolves into two discrete phonemes
- Split screen (disambiguation)
- Splitter (disambiguation)
- Split decision, combat sports term when a fight is scored non-unanimously for one fighter by all judges
