= Splitting =

Splitting may refer to:

- Splitting (psychology)
- Lumpers and splitters, in classification or taxonomy
- Wood splitting
- Tongue splitting

== Mathematics ==
- Heegaard splitting
- Splitting field
- Splitting principle
- Splitting theorem
- Splitting lemma
- Matrix splitting
- for the numerical method to solve differential equations, see Symplectic integrator

== See also ==
- Split (disambiguation)
- Splitter (disambiguation)
