= Death of Abdul Wali =

Afghan man killed in United States custody in 2003

Abdul Wali
- Born: 1974/1975; Afghanistan
- Died: June 21, 2003 (aged 28); Kunar Province, Afghanistan
- Cause of death: Injuries from torture
- Known for: Torture victim

David Passaro
- Born: 1966 (age 59–60); North Carolina, U.S.
- Status: Released
- Convictions: Assault resulting in serious bodily injury Simple assault (3 counts)
- Penalty: 8 years and 4 months imprisonment; commuted to 6 years and 8 months imprisonment

Abdul Wali was an Afghan farmer who was tortured to death in United States custody on June 21, 2003, at the age of 28. At the time of his death, he had been held for three days at the US base 10 miles (16 km) south of Asadabad, in Kunar Province, Afghanistan, on suspicion of involvement in a rocket attack on the same base, after voluntarily handing himself in. The local governor, Said Akbar, had told Wali to turn himself in so he could clear his name.

The cause of his death was at first reported to be a heart attack, but this came into question when three soldiers of the 82nd Airborne Division came forward to testify that Central Intelligence Agency contractor David Passaro assaulted Wali. Passaro, a former Army Ranger, allegedly beat Wali for two consecutive nights, causing grievous injuries including a fractured pelvis. Prosecutors would charge that Passaro ordered soldiers not to allow Wali to sleep, limited his access to food and water and subjected him to two consecutive nights of interrogation and beatings. Among other injuries, Wali suffered a suspected fractured pelvis that would have made it impossible for him to urinate. Witnesses testified that during one session Passaro, while wearing combat boots, kicked Wali in the groin hard enough to lift him off the ground, threw Wali to the ground, beat Wali on the arms and legs with a heavy Maglite flashlight, and vigorously thrust a flashlight into Wali's abdomen. After the second night of beatings, Wali begged the Americans to kill him and repeatedly moaned "I'm dying." Wali died on his fourth day in custody. He repeatedly denied any involvement in the rocket attacks.

Passaro was initially charged with two counts of assault with intent to do bodily harm and two counts of assault resulting in serious bodily injury. He faced up to 40 years in prison. However, Passaro was instead found guilty of one count of assault resulting in serious bodily injury, and three lesser counts of simple assault. Passaro faced a maximum of 11.5 years in prison. Said Akbar wrote to the judge, requesting that he impose the harshest sentence possible, saying Wali's death had helped terrorist recruiters. Passaro was sentenced to 8 years and 4 months in prison and three years of supervised release. This was over double what federal sentencing guidelines usually recommend for assault charges.

The judge told Passaro that he was lucky there was no autopsy report or else he likely would have been charged with murder. In 2010, Passaro's sentence was reduced to 6 years and 8 months. An appellate court ruled that the judge had failed to fully explain his reasoning for exceeding the guidelines. Passaro was released from prison on January 26, 2011.

During Passaro's trial, his ex-wife, Kerry, said he physically and emotionally abused her during their marriage. She later told a reporter that she was not surprised by what Passaro had done. He is the first and only person connected with the CIA to have been convicted in a post-September 11 abuse case. Passaro was also the first American charged under the U.S. Patriot Act, which extended the jurisdiction of U.S. federal courts to include certain violations of the law committed by military contractors overseas.

During his sentencing hearing, Passaro expressed regret over Wali's death. "He is a human being," he said. "I failed him. If I could go back and change things, it would have never happened. I wish I had never gone in to talk to him."

However, Passaro later said he thought his prosecution was political, telling Retro Report "I believe 100% that Abu Ghraib, when it kicked off and finally came to public's awareness, that they had to show they were going to hold the CIA accountable, so they had me." He said he did not regret what he did and would not have done anything different.

Wali's story in part was told on National Public Radio by Hyder Akbar for a 2003 show on the program This American Life. Akbar had escorted Wali to the US forces as a sign of protection and good will; Hyder Akbar's father Said Fazal Akbar was then Governor of Kunar Province where the incidents happened. Said Akbar has stated that Wali's death became a tool for insurgency recruiting and "created a huge setback for Afghanistan's national reconciliation efforts."
