= Heavyweight (podcast) =

Non-fiction short stories podcast

- Podcast art for Heavyweight
- Format: Non-fiction short stories
- Language: English

Creative team
- Created by: Jonathan Goldstein

Music
- Ending theme: "Sun in an Empty Room" by The Weakerthans

Production
- Production: Gimlet Media (2016-2023); Pushkin Industries (2025-present)
- Length: 40–60 minutes

Technical specifications
- Audio format: Stereophonic; MP3

Publication
- No. of seasons: 9
- No. of episodes: 66
- Original release: September 23, 2016 – present

Related
- Website: www.pushkin.fm/podcasts/heavyweight

Heavyweight is a podcast created and hosted by American-Canadian humorist Jonathan Goldstein where he helps people try to resolve a moment from their past that they wish they could change. Produced by Goldstein, Stevie Lane, and Kalila Holt, the show was launched on Gimlet Media in 2016 and has aired at Pushkin Industries since 2025.

== Podcast format ==
The podcast follows host Jonathan Goldstein as he helps a guest attempt to find closure about an unresolved question, relationship or event in their lives. Each episode begins with a phone call to Goldstein's friend, Jackie Cohen, before the introduction of a guest who may be known to Goldstein, like family or friends, or listeners who have contracted the show for assistance. The first episode featured Goldstein's father Buzz and his estranged brother, and the second featured Goldstein's friend Gregor who wanted a CD collection back from Moby.

== Production ==
Heavyweight is produced by Goldstein, along with Stevie Lane and Kalila Holt. The show's theme song, "Sun in an Empty Room" by The Weakerthans, plays at the end of each episode. Goldstein told Sarah Larson of The New Yorker that the name "Heavyweight" is meant to suggest the emotional burdens that each of us carry around.

The show launched in 2016 on Gimlet Media. The podcast later aired on Spotify following the company's 2019 acquisition of Gimlet, and cancelled in December 2023 as part of a move away from narrative-driven shows to personality focused productions. In February 2025, it was announced the they would be joining Pushkin Industries and begin producing new episodes later that year.

== Reception ==
Heavyweight has been positively reviewed in The New York Times, The New Yorker, The Atlantic, The Financial Times, The Irish Times and The Guardian. Writing in the Financial Times, Fiona Sturges called the show "terrifically moving".

The New Yorker wrote: "With gumption, empathy, and comic awkwardness, [Goldstein] ventures into people's lives and tries to help them resolve things from the past: an unsolved human mystery, lingering guilt, a falling-out, hurt that's turned to grievance." The Guardian wrote: "Goldstein leads his subjects back to that crucial moment when things went wrong and then helps them confront it so they can move on. Enthralling."

Over the years, Heavyweight has appeared on numerous critic's lists as one of the best podcasts in the industry. The show was named the Number One podcast of 2016 by The Atlantic, one of the best podcasts of 2019 by The Economist, and one of the best podcasts of 2023 by The Week and The New York Times.

The show spent 4 days at #1 on the US iTunes podcast charts in September 2016, following its series premiere. In Canada, the show was at #1 for thirteen days.

== Awards ==
Heavyweight has received 6 podcast industry honors, including 2 nominations for the Best Society and Culture Podcast through the Ambies. In 2020, the episode "The Marshes" was nominated for an IDA Documentary award for best audio documentary, and the Third Coast International Audio Festival gave the episode "Gregor" the TC/RHDF 2017 Skylarking Award in 2017. That episode was produced by Jonathan Goldstein, Chris Neary, Wendy Dorr and Kalila Holt.

== Series overview ==
Season	Episodes	Release date		Notes
Season	Episodes	First episode	Last episode	Notes
1	1. Buzz; 2. Gregor; 3. Tara; 4. Tony; 5. Galit; 6. James; 7. Julia; 8. Jeremy	September 23, 2016	November 15, 2016	
2	9. Milt; 10. Rose; 11. Christina; 12. Jesse; 13. Kenny; 14. Isabel; 15. Dina	October 26, 2017	December 7, 2017	
3	16. Rob; 17. Skye; 18. Sven; 19. Joey; 20. Soraya; 21. Rachael; 22. Marchel; 23. Alex	October 4, 2018	December 13, 2018	A special episode, a recording of a Heavyweight live show was released between episodes #18 and #19.
3.5	1. The Heavy Wait Diaries: Chapter 1; 2. The Heavy Wait Diaries: Chapter 2; 3. The Heavy Wait Diaries: Chapter 3; 4. The Heavy Wait Diaries: Chapter 4; 5. The Heavy Wait Diaries: Chapter 5; 6. The Heavy Wait Diaries: Chapter 6; 7. The Heavy Wait Diaries: Chapter 7; 8. The Heavy Wait Diaries: Chapter 8	August 1, 2019	September 19, 2019	The Heavy Wait Diaries: Short essays from Goldstein released in the lead up to Season 4. Episodes available only on Spotify
4	24. Jimmy and Mark; 25. Becky and Jo; 26. Beverly and Van; 27. Scott; 28. Dr Muller; 29. Elyse; 30. The Marshes; 31. Marie-Claude	September 26, 2019	December 19, 2019	
4.5	1. Heavyweight Checks In 1; 2. Heavyweight Checks In 2; 3. Heavyweight Checks In 3; 4. Heavyweight Checks In 4; 5. Heavyweight Checks In 5; 6. Heavyweight Checks In 6; 7. Heavyweight Checks In 7; 8. Heavyweight Checks In 8	March 8, 2020	June 18, 2020	Heavyweight Check in: Short stories primarily covering how Heavyweight cast and former guests are doing during the COVID-19 pandemic.
5	32. Vivian; 33. Bobby; 34. Annie; 35. Rachael and Jon	October 15, 2020	November 12, 2020	
5.5	1. Check In: Do You Like Music?; 2. Check In: Curtis Sittenfeld; 3. Check In: Holiday Special; 4. Heavyweight Short: Hallie; 5. Heavyweight Short: The Sharing Place; 6. Heavyweight Short: A Canadian Tale	December 3, 2020	July 15, 2021	Heavyweight Check in: Short stories primarily covering how Heavyweight cast and former guests as well as a Trio of "Shorts".
6	36. Brandon; 37. John; 38. Justine; 39. Stephen; 40. Barbara Shutt; 41. Barbara Wilson; 42. Mark; 43. Maura	September 30, 2021	December 16, 2021	The series transitioned to appearing exclusively on Spotify with episode #41.
7	44. Sara; 45. Sgt. John Kapphahn; 46. Dan; 47. Frederick J. Brown; 48. Ben; 49. Another Roadside Attraction; 50. Nick; 51. The Elliotts	September 22, 2022	December 22, 2022	
8	52. Lenny; 53. Leif; 54. Victor and Maite; 55. Toby; 56. 44 Photos; 57. The Budget Motel; Heavyweight Short: Yasser; Heavyweight Short: Loch: 58. Harry	October 5, 2023	December 21, 2023	
9	59. Etta; 60. The Messenger; 61. The Bank Robber; 62. Stefano; 63. Jasmine; 64. Heavyweight: Live from New York; 65. Kevin; 66. Meredith	September 18, 2025	December 18, 2025	
10	67. Jenna	September 17, 2026	Ongoing	
