= Lenny Bruce Is Dead =

Lenny Bruce is Dead is the first book by author and radio presenter Jonathan Goldstein. The story follows a lead character, Josh, through various events in his life, including a death in the family and his exploration of sexuality. The novel includes multiple themes, such as love, faith, a dysfunctional family, and wavering faith. Its title is a direct quote of the first line of the song "Lenny Bruce" by Bob Dylan (from his 1981 album Shot of Love).
