= Atheist Film Festival =

Film festival (2009–2014)

The Atheist Film Festival
- Location: San Francisco, California, United States
- Founded: 2009
- Founded by: David Fitzgerald, Hank Pellissier, Veronica Chater
- Language: English

The Atheist Film Festival was an annual event that ran from 2009-2014. When it launched, it was the world’s first film festival dedicated to showcasing feature films, documentaries, shorts and animated cinema created especially for the atheist community. It was founded by David Fitzgerald, Hank Pellissier and Veronica Chater and focused on films recognizing science, the distinction between church and state and more and as of 2012 was the only explicitly atheist film festival.

The Festival grew over the years from small films that the founders rented from Netflix to VIP receptions, and in its fifth year, programming at San Francisco's Roxie Theater.

In 2014 the founders announced the festival's end.

== See also ==
- Hank Pellissier
- Veronica Chater
- Netflix
- Roxie Theater
