= Splitter =

Splitter or splitters may refer to:

== Technology ==
- DSL filter or DSL splitter, in telecommunications
- Fiber-optic splitter
- Hybrid coil, a three windings transformer
- Power dividers and directional couplers, in RF engineering
- Siamese connection for hydrants and fire hoses
- Splitter (automotive), an aerodynamic feature in cars
- Splitter, a table saw safety device
- Y-cable, a type of cable containing three ends of which one is a common end that in turn leads to a split into the remaining two ends
- Phase splitter

== Science and mathematics ==
- Splitter (geometry), a line segment of a triangle
- Lumpers and splitters, opposing tendencies in any discipline which has to place individual examples into rigorously defined categories

== Sports ==
- Split-finger fastball, or splitter, a baseball throwing technique
- Mark Splitter, an American college football coach
- Tiago Splitter, a Brazilian basketball player

== Other uses ==
- Another name for fictional superhero Arm Fall Off Boy
- TimeSplitters, a first-person shooter video game

== See also ==
- File splitter, in computing, a media demultiplexer
- Splittermuster, a World War II-era German camouflage pattern
- Split (disambiguation)
- Splitting (disambiguation)
