= Bobby Hitt =

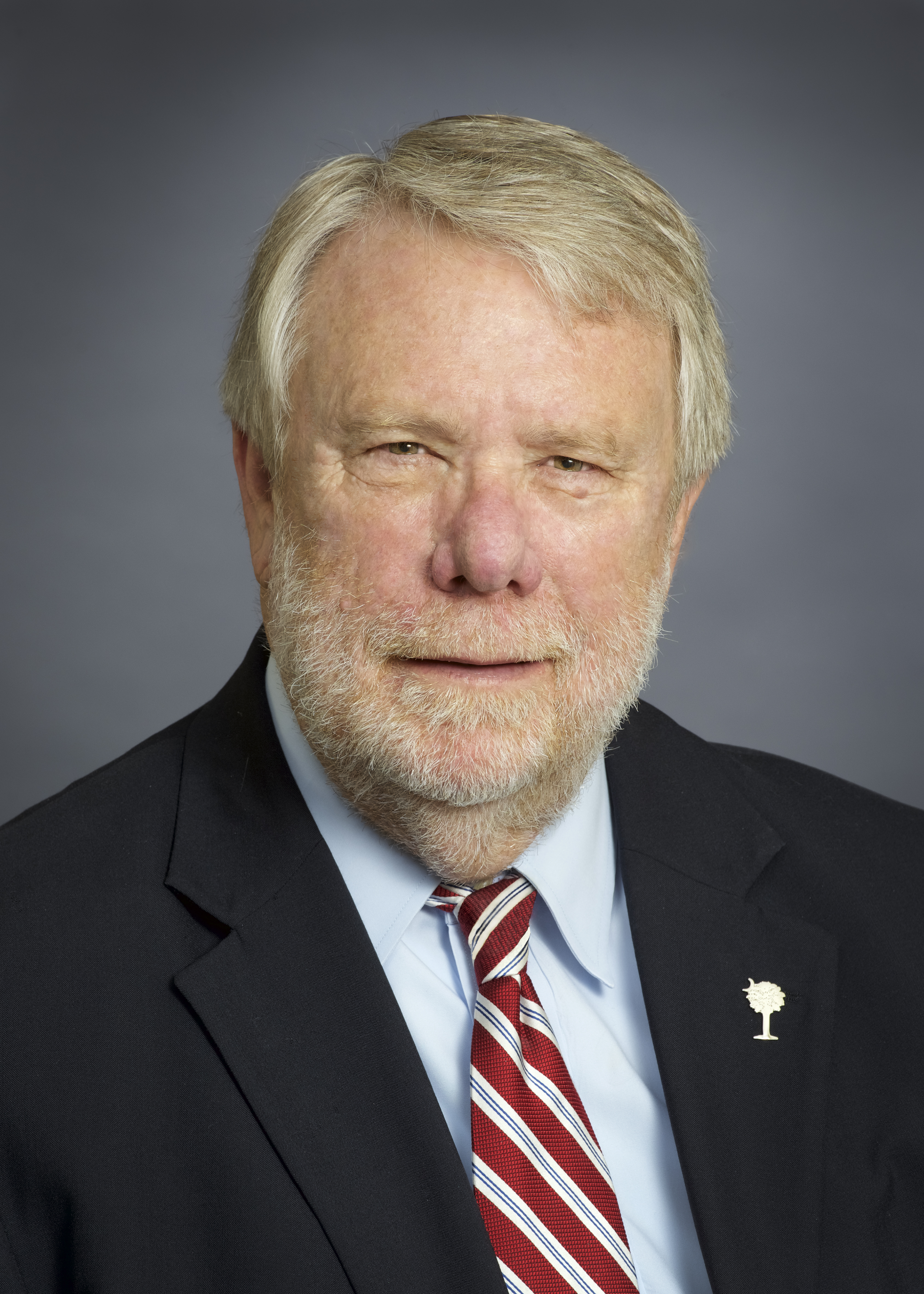

South Carolina Secretary of Commerce
- In office January 2011 – June 2021
- Preceded by: Joe E. Taylor, Jr.
- Succeeded by: Harry M. Lightsey III

Personal details
- Born: Robert M. Hitt III; December 27, 1949 (age 76) Charleston, South Carolina, U.S.
- Relatives: Jack Hitt (brother)
- Education: University of South Carolina

Robert M. Hitt III is a government and business leader in the State of South Carolina. A native of Charleston, South Carolina, he was appointed the state's Secretary of Commerce in January 2011. Hitt began his career as a journalist, following in the footsteps of both his father and grandfather. Over nearly two decades, he built a reputation as a dogged journalist for two of South Carolina's most respected newspapers. Prior to leading the state's economic development agency, Hitt served as an executive at the BMW plant in Spartanburg County, South Carolina.

== Personal life ==
=== Family ===
Hitt was born on December 27, 1949, to Ann Leonard Hitt and Robert M. "Red" Hitt, Jr. of Charleston. His youngest brother is the author and journalist Jack Hitt. A third-generation newspaper man, Hitt's father served as the editor of The Charleston Evening Post, which later merged with the Charleston News and Courier to form The Post and Courier. And, his grandfather, Robert Hitt, Sr. was editor of The Bamberg Herald. Today, Hitt is married to Gwen, and they have two sons, Lucas and Robert Paul.

=== Education ===
Hitt graduated from the University of South Carolina with a B.A. in Journalism in 1973. In 1987, as a recipient of the Neiman Fellowship for Journalists, Hitt studied for a year at Harvard University, focusing on the impact of social, political and economic change on the South.

== Career ==
=== Journalism ===
Hitt worked for 17 years at The State and the Columbia Record. He served as managing editor of the Columbia Record from 1980 to 1987 and served in the same role for The State from 1988 to 1991.

=== Industry ===
In 1991, Hitt left journalism to join Nelson Mullins Riley & Scarborough LLP as the director of planning and development. In that role, he assisted in the effort to recruit BMW to the State of South Carolina. On June 22, 1992, BMW announced that it had selected Spartanburg County, S.C. for the site of its first North American manufacturing plant. Subsequently, the German automaker hired Hitt to manage public affairs for the plant. He served as manager of corporate affairs for BMW until 2010.

=== Secretary of Commerce ===
In January 2011, South Carolina Governor Nikki Haley appointed Hitt state Secretary of Commerce. Throughout his tenure, the S.C. Department of Commerce has recruited approximately $30 billion in capital investment and 105,000 new jobs. Additionally, the state has secured significant investments from international brands, including BMW, Boeing, Bridgestone, Continental AG, Giti Tire, LPL Financial Holdings, Mercedes-Benz Vans, Michelin, Samsung, Toray and Volvo Cars.

Additionally, the state of South Carolina has achieved an export sales record in each year of Hitt's tenure. In 2016, the state exported more than $31 billion in products for the first time, leading the nation in the export sales of completed passenger vehicles and tires.

=== Honors ===
Throughout his career, Hitt has received several awards and accolades, including:

- Order of the Palmetto, the State of South Carolina's highest civilian honor
- Distinguished Journalism Alumni of the Year Award in 2006 from the University of South Carolina
- Third Annual Welling Collaboration Award from Ten at the Top
- Roger Milliken Defender of Manufacturing Award from the South Carolina Manufacturers' Alliance
- Spirit of the Upstate Award from the Upstate S.C. Alliance
- Public Servant of the Year from the Columbia Chamber of Commerce
- Distinguished German American of the Year from the German-American Heritage Foundation
