= Jake Warga =

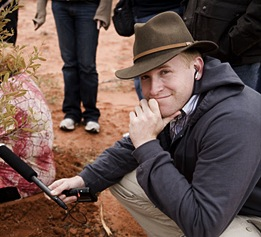
- Born: April 24, 1972 (age 53); California
- Education: University of California, Davis; Goldsmiths, University of London
- Occupations: Journalist and Lecturer
- Notable credit(s): All Things Considered (NPR); Day to Day (NPR); The World (PRI); Studio 360 (PRI); This American Life (PRI); The Savvy Traveler (PRI); Weekend America (APM); Hearing Voices; Seattle Stranger

Jake Warga (born 1972) is an American radio journalist, former Stanford University lecturer, and contributor to various public radio organizations, including National Public Radio, Public Radio International, and American Public Media. Warga is also a professional photographer and travel writer, having traveled to, and reported from, six of the seven continents.

== Life ==
Jake Warga was born in Hollywood, California, to Wayne and Carol Warga; his father was a writer for Life Magazine and the Los Angeles Times. Warga received a Bachelor of Arts in anthropology from UC Davis in 1995 and a Master of Arts in visual anthropology from Goldsmiths, University of London in 2003.

== Work ==
=== Film ===
During and after college, Warga worked as an assistant cameraman on several Hollywood films including, Witchboard 2: The Devil's Doorway (1993), Nice Guys Sleep Alone (1999), The Prophecy 3: The Ascent (2000), Mimic 2 (2001), and many others. He was also the cinematographer for the films Lineage (1997), Sleep When You're Dead (1997), and numerous short projects.

=== Radio ===
In 1996, while working in Hollywood, Warga became interested in public radio almost by happenstance. When a colleague asked him for help recording an audio documentary about homeless people's pets, he went online in search of technical help and found a website called Transom.org. Using tools recommended by Transom and working with Transom editors, Warga co-produced his first piece, "Street Dogs," which aired on Seattle's National Public Radio affiliate KUOW (94.9FM). Since then, Warga has contributed a number of stories to public radio programs, including National Public Radio's All Things Considered and Day to Day; American Public Media's Weekend America; and Public Radio International's The World, Studio 360, This American Life and The Savvy Traveler. His stories have been broadcast throughout the world and are archived on the Hearing Voices website and the Public Radio Exchange. A personal essay of his, "Father's Day," which aired on Weekend America, won the 2005 Golden Reel Award from the National Federation of Community Broadcasters.

From December 2009 to January 2010, Warga embedded with U.S. soldiers in Iraq, reporting for Marketplace and The World. He did a popular series of radio pieces asking what soldiers were listening to on their iPods as a way to understanding their personal experiences about deployment.

In December 2012, Warga embedded with U.S. Forces in Afghanistan to produce the radio series “The Things They Carry” for PRX.org, inspired by the Tim O’Brian book “The Things They Carried”.

=== Photography ===
In 2008, Warga published his first photo essay, Asses of the World, containing pictures of donkeys taken in various parts of the world set to humorous captions.

Warga recently had an exhibit at the Seattle Art Museum called “Faces”, a multi-media project combining one hundred photographic portraits of various Africans with ambient sounds collected from the field.

Warga's stock photography is represented by Getty Images.

=== Teaching ===
Warga was a lecturer in the Stanford Storytelling Program (2015-2019), and formerly a faculty member at Al Akhawayn University in Morocco at the School of Humanities and Social Sciences teaching various media production courses and general humanities core courses.

He also taught the following classes and workshops in the USA: Writing for Radio; Documentary Studies and Production; Photography, Cinematography, Mixed-Media, Production Sound and Lighting. Warga has been a guest lecturer at the University of London, the University of Southern California, the University of Washington, and the Australian Film, Television and Radio School.

== Awards ==
- Society for Professional Journalists' 2002 Mark of Excellence Award for "Radio Feature Reporting"
- National Federation of Community Broadcasters' 2005 Golden Reel Award for "Personal Essay"
- Golden Reel Award 2005 for "Father's Day," National Federation of Community Broadcasters
- Clarion Award—Association for Women in Communications (2x) for "Home from Africa" and "Islamic Feminism"

== See also ==
- List of 2003 This American Life episodes
- List of 2004 This American Life episodes
