= Ladies and Gentlemen, the Bible! =

Book by Jonathan Goldstein

- Author: Jonathan Goldstein
- Language: English
- Publication date: March 31, 2009
- ISBN: 9780143056546

Ladies and Gentlemen, the Bible! is a book written by author and radio presenter Jonathan Goldstein. The book is a comedic retelling of the Old Testament stories such as Adam and Eve, Samson, Noah, and David and Goliath. Ladies and Gentlemen, the Bible! includes a story narrated by Joseph, who is skeptical of believing in Immaculate Conception, which was broadcast on the "Holiday Spectacular" episode of This American Life.

== See also ==
- Lamb: The Gospel According to Biff, Christ's Childhood Pal
