= Return to Earth (film) =

- DVD cover art
- Genre: Biography; Drama
- Based on: Return to Earth by Buzz Aldrin with Wayne Warga
- Directed by: Jud Taylor
- Starring: Cliff Robertson; Shirley Knight; Charles Cioffi; Ralph Bellamy; Stefanie Powers
- Music by: Billy Goldenberg
- Country of origin: United States
- Original language: English

Production
- Executive producers: Rupert Hitzig; Alan King
- Producer: Jud Taylor
- Cinematography: Frank Stanley
- Editor: Ronald J. Fagan
- Running time: 74 minutes
- Production company: King-Hitzig Productions

Original release
- Network: ABC
- Release: May 14, 1976

Return to Earth is an American biopic television film that originally aired on May 14, 1976 on ABC. The film stars Cliff Robertson as astronaut Buzz Aldrin and Shirley Knight as Joan Aldrin. Based upon Aldrin's 1973 book of the same name, the film dramatizes the emotional difficulties of Aldrin's life following his 1969 trip to the Moon on Apollo 11. The film was directed by Jud Taylor, and Aldrin served as a consultant.

== Plot ==
Based upon his own book of his ordeals, the film is the story of Buzz Aldrin, the second man to walk on the Moon, and the problems he had after the mission and his return to Earth, including the breakup of his marriage, his struggles with clinical depression and alcoholism, and his hospitalization for psychiatric problems.

== Cast ==
- Cliff Robertson as Col. Edwin E. 'Buzz' Aldrin Jr.
- Shirley Knight as Joan Aldrin
- Charles Cioffi as Dr. Sam Mayhill
- Ralph Bellamy as Col. Edwin E. Aldrin
- Stefanie Powers as Marianne
- Kraig Metzinger as Andy Aldrin
- Alexandra Taylor as Jan Aldrin
- Tony Marks as Mike Aldrin
- Stephen Pearlman as Dr. Hotfield
- Stefan Gierasch as Al Davis
- Mark Roberts
- Lance Henriksen
- Conard Fowkes
- George D. Wallace
- Robert Karnes
- Davis Roberts
- Robert Williams
- Shelley Mitchell

== Production ==
Robertson's casting was announced in September 1975.

== Reception ==
The Los Angeles Times called it "decent, well acted, uninspired."
