= Wayne Warga =

Author and journalist

Wayne Philip Warga
- Born: January 26, 1938; Los Angeles, California
- Died: April 27, 1994 (aged 56); Los Angeles, California
- Education: University of Southern California (1960)
- Occupations: Author, journalist, and Foreign Correspondent
- Notable credit(s): Life magazine Los Angeles Times; USA Today: The Television Show; Entertainment Tonight; Return to Earth (novel, written with Buzz Aldrin), 1986; Natalie: A Memoir by Her Sister (with Lana Wood) (novel), Hardcover (novel), 1986; Fatal Impressions (novel), 1989; Singapore Transfer (novel), 1991

Wayne Philip Warga (January 26, 1938 – April 27, 1994) was an American author, journalist, and foreign correspondent who wrote largely about entertainment and penned several novels.

Warga was a foreign correspondent for Life magazine, covering hotspots from Cuba to East Berlin, was assistant editor of the "Calendar" section of the Los Angeles Times in the 1970s, wrote for the television program USA Today: The Television Show, and was the head writer for Entertainment Tonight/Entertainment This Week.

He later turned to books, writing both non-fiction and fiction. His nonfiction works included Return to Earth (1973) with astronaut Buzz Aldrin, which was later made into a movie, and Natalie: A Memoir by Her Sister (1984) with actress Natalie Wood's sister Lana Wood. Warga also wrote three mysteries: Hardcover (1986), for which he earned a Shamus Award, Fatal Impressions (1989), and Singapore Transfer (1991).

== Personal life ==
Warga was born to Wayne Arlington Warga, a studio employee, and Alma Joyce Warga Kelsey (Smith), a homemaker. Warga married Carol Reese, an artist and editor, on November 27, 1965, and was the father of writer, lecturer, and radio producer, Jake Warga. Warga was a collector of contemporary art and an avid fan of flying.

== Illness and death ==
In 1990, Warga fell ill from a contaminated batch of L-tryptophan manufactured by a Japanese company and distributed in the United States and eventually died after prolonged battle with cancer and several rounds of chemotherapy.

== Award ==
- Shamus Award for Best First P. I. Novel, "Hardcover" (1986)
