= Hyder Akbar =

American writer and entrepreneur in Afghanistan

- Born: 1984 (age 41–42); Peshawar, Pakistan
- Citizenship: Afghanistan; United States
- Education: Yale University
- Father: Said Fazal Akbar

Said Hyder Akbar (born 1984 in Peshawar, Pakistan) is an American writer and an entrepreneur in Afghanistan.

== Education and personal life ==
Akbar, a citizen of both Afghanistan and the United States, attended Diablo Valley College and transferred to Yale University. While a senior at Yale, Akbar became the subject of controversy when he and two other students were arrested for arson after he burned an American flag. Akbar admitted to burning the flag and had to perform 50 hours of community service.

Akbar is from a political family, including Said Shamsoudin Majroh, who was the architect of Afghanistan's first constitution in 1964 and who had served as the Minister of Justice and Head of Tribal Affairs; Said Bahaoudin Majroh, who had served as Governor and was considered one of Afghanistan's leading intellectuals; and another influential member of the family was Shal Pacha, a tribal leader whose influence was particularly strong in the eastern region as well as the FATA areas of Pakistan. His father is Said Fazal Akbar, a former governor of the Kunar Province of Afghanistan.

Akbar is fluent in English, Pashto, Dari, Hindi, and Urdu.

=== Work in Afghanistan ===
While assisting US forces, Akbar encouraged an Afghan man, Abdul Wali, to turn himself in and assured Wali he would not be mistreated. Akbar accompanied Wali to a US base, and served as a translator for David Passaro, a former special forces soldier, whom the CIA had hired, on contract, to serve as an interrogator—even though he had no background in interrogation. Akbar later described Passaro as "full of rage" and "a big a--hole". He said he had to stop translating because Passaro became too aggressive. After Akbar left, Wali was beaten by Passaro and later died from his injuries.

Based in part on Akbar's testimony and a letter from his father, who said Passaro created distrust and set back reconstruction efforts, Passaro was convicted of assault and sentenced to eight years and four months imprisonment on February 14, 2007.

=== Documentaries and writing ===
Akbar has also made two documentaries for the Peabody Award winning public radio program This American Life, both broadcast during 2003 (episodes 230 and 254). The first documentary focused on life in Kabul in post-Taliban Afghanistan and the challenges that faced the central government. The second was based on time spent in Kunar, Afghanistan – a volatile province on the border with Pakistan. Akbar's work received a National Journalism Award, a Third Coast International Silver Prize and an Overseas Press Club citation.

Akbar and radio producer Susan Burton later wrote a book about his experiences in Afghanistan, called Come Back to Afghanistan: A California Teenager's Story, published by Bloomsbury in 2005. The book received several honors: San Francisco Chronicle Book of the Year, New York Times Editor's Pick, USA Today’s Top 10 Memoirs, and ALA Top 10 Books for Young Readers.

== Media work and non-profit involvement ==
Akbar has appeared on Morning Edition, PBS and BBC World News among others. He has also been featured in GQ, New York Magazine, The Los Angeles Times, and various other publications. Akbar has also authored articles for The New York Times and Slate.

Along with his work in the media, Akbar has also been involved with the Hoover Institution in archiving and keeping records of Afghanistan's current events.

Akbar was also the founder and co-director of Wadan Afghanistan, an NGO focusing on quick impact reconstruction projects in his native province of Kunar. The NGO rebuilt schools and helped villages with access to water among other things.
