= Hank Pellissier =

American writer and activist

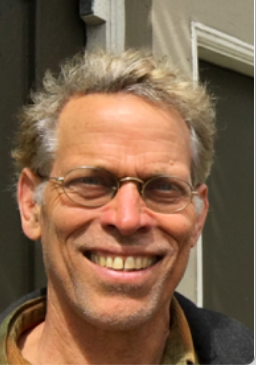
- Pellissier in 2008 Voice of Hank Pellissier
- Writing career
- Pen name: Hank Hyena

Hank Pellissier is a writer, editor, speaker, activist, political theorist, producer, and nonprofit director. He has been involved with transhumanist, atheist, educational, and humanitarian topics.

== Career ==
In the 1980s and 1990s, Pellissier used the moniker "Hank Hyena" as a San Francisco performance artist, slam poet, and metro/gonzo journalist. Reviews of his work varied. A Los Angeles Times headline of his 1992 performance art at the Burbage Theater claimed "Kids' Stuff Gets the Best of Hank Hyena" and said he appeared “Childish instead of childlike." Conversely John Strausbaugh, in a highly critical review of the anthology The Outlaw Bible of American Poetry for New York Press in 2015, described Hank Hyena as one of the "better representatives of the 90s shout-it-out school of poetry", and Matt Honan, co-founder of Gettingit.com, said, "Hank was insanely funny and would do – and write about – anything you asked. Literally, anything." As Hank Hyena, Pellissier contributed to Salon.com, SFGate.com, and GettingIt.com, performed at the Cleveland Performance Art Festival in 1991, and produced a "subversive" fashion show as part of a Mozart festival in San Francisco in 1991. Under his own name, Pellissier co-produced an Atheist Film Festival in San Francisco and was the “Local Intelligence” columnist for The New York Times in 2010".

Pellissier published transhumanist/futurist essays in HplusMagazine, and, in the early 2010s, wrote articles for the Institute for Ethics and Emerging Technologies (IEET) where he was appointed managing director in 2012. His essay “Eight Ways In-Vitro Meat Will Change Our Lives” was re-published in Best of H+ Magazine. He has also self-published the books Invent Utopia Now: Transhumanist Suggestions for the Pre-Singularity Era, and Brighter Brains – 225 Ways to Elevate or Injure IQ.

After leaving IEET, he started the nonprofit Brighter Brains Institute and produced eight "Transhuman Vision" conferences in the SF Bay Area. The Brighter Brains Institute built the "world’s first atheist orphanage" in Uganda in 2015. Pellissier stated that he finds "it appalling that people want to go to Mars but they neglect the fact that there are millions of people in the world who are starving." In 2020, his nonprofit changed its name to Humanist Global Charity, and in 2023 it changed its name again to Humanist Mutual Aid Network. In 2016, Pellissier was featured in TheHumanist.com as an "atheist missionary" and in 2022 he was interviewed on his humanitarian work by Pacific Coast TV.

== Political theories ==
Pellisier presented a position for Global Egalitarianism in a 2020 essay published by The Hampton Institute. In 2025, he aligned himself with "Limitarianism" and he established a website that advocates this radical wealth-and-power sharing philosophy.

== Activism ==
In 2023, Pellissier launched a street activist group that organized multiple protests for ceasefire in the Gaza War. The group received attention from radio channel KPFA in Berkeley, California, with the station stating: "A Mega Mouth Rebels rally is unlike any other rally, it mixes elements of theater to engage the audience on issues they champion, the interactive activism empowers people and brings them together."

== See also ==
- Atheist Film Festival
