= Humanist Mutual Aid Network =

Charity based in the US

- Abbreviation: HuMAN
- Formation: 2013
- Type: 501(c)(3) non-profit
- Legal status: Active
- Region served: Worldwide
- Key people: Phil Zuckerman (Executive Director) Karen Zelevinsky (Board President) Hank Pellissier (Founder, Program Director)
- Website: https://www.thehuman.team/

Humanist Mutual Aid Network (HuMAN) is a 501c3 non-profit in California.

HuMAN was founded by Hank Pellissier, who stated in an interview that the organization "works toward a world with humanist values that respects science, secular education, sustainability, kindness, peace and democracy". The nonprofit provides secular support to at-risk populations internationally, via educational opportunities, technological solutions, health assistance and small business grants. HuMAN's work funds secular education, humanist students, women's collectives, orphans, safe houses, and helplines. It also offers internships in Africa & India Development.

== History ==
HuMAN's original name was the Brighter Brains Institute, founder Hank Pellissier launched its activities in 2015 by starting the "world’s first atheist orphanage" in Muhokya, Uganda. The director - Bwambale Robert Musubaho - was orphaned himself at the age of five; he renounced religion in the early 2000s after researching his doubts and finding community on the internet. BBI raised enough money via crowdfunding to also build two ‘humanist’ primary schools and a secondary school near the orphanage. Freedom From Religion Foundation described the schools as "groundbreaking".

BBI expanded its secular activities throughout western Uganda, building classrooms for a remote school in the Rwenzori mountains, and constructing another humanist secondary school in Kanunga, the site of a 2000 Christian cult massacre. Brighter Brains Humanist Secondary School in Kanunga included a Richard Dawkins Science Laboratory and a Christopher Hitchens Freethinker Library. Funds were partially raised via promotion in the UK publication THE FREETHINKER.

In 2020–2021, BBI changed its name to Humanist Global Charity. While in 2024, it changed to Humanist Mutual Aid Network and has since then expanded internationally.

== Projects ==
Humanist Mutual Aid Network provides about $100,000 a year for humanitarian aid projects. In addition to founding and supporting several humanist schools and orphanages in Uganda, HuMAN has funded sixteen humanist clinics that provided free medicine, works to dispel belief in witch doctors, and distributes sanitary pads (AFRIPads) in Africa, India, and Nepal. HGC has partnered with women's collectives and LGBTQ organizations to emphasize equality and provide sex education, family planning, and birth control.

== Board of directors ==
- Steven Pinker PhD - Honorary Board Member
- Daniel Dennett - Honorary Board Member
- Jennifer M. Hecht PhD - Honorary Board Member
- Alice Greczyn - Honorary Board Member
- Karen Zelevinsky - President
- Phil Zuckerman PhD - Executive Director
- Mandisa Thomas - Board
- Yasmine Mohammed - Board
- Anthony Pinn PhD - Board
- Ophelia Benson - Board
- Jessica Ahlquist - Youth Activism
- Hank Pellissier - Founder, Program Director, Treasurer
