= Split (video game) =

2025 video game

s.p.l.i.t
- Developer: Mike Klubnika
- Engine: Godot
- Platforms: Windows; Linux
- Release: 24 July 2025
- Mode: Single-player

Split (stylised as s.p.l.i.t) is a 2025 psychological horror game developed and published by Estonian game developer Mike Klubnika.

== Gameplay ==
Split is a short linear single-player game in which the player controls a hacker named Axel. The game is played from a first-person perspective as Axel sits at his desk and interacts with diegetic computer interfaces. The Alt and A or D keys allow the player to look to the left or right of the desk to view a window or an electronic device respectively. At the desk, the player can switch between two computer screens: one displaying an IRC channel, and one displaying a text-only command-line interface similar to MS-DOS, Command Prompt, or the Unix command-line. Players interact with the game exclusively by typing on a keyboard, with no option for mouse or gamepad inputs. Similar to a typing game, the player types out Axel's anxious thoughts to dispel them and progress. The player receives instructions from Axel's hacker co-conspirators through the IRC chatroom, and typing using any keys allows Axel to respond with pre-written dialog. In the command-line interface, the player types commands to navigate the computer's files and solve puzzles. The game can be completed in approximately one to two hours and has two endings.

== Development and release ==
Split was developed by Estonian game developer Mike Klubnika, better known for the 2023 indie horror game Buckshot Roulette. Klubnika initially developed small games as a hobby while working and studying full-time, but the success of Buckshot Roulette, which sold over 6 million copies, allowed him to pursue game development as a career. First announced on 19 June 2026, Split launched on Steam for Windows and Linux (including SteamOS) on 24 July 2025.

== Reception ==
Split received "generally favorable" reviews from critics, according to review aggregator platform Metacritic. Nick Reuben of Rock, Paper, Shotgun recommended Split, calling it "tense and tactile" and noting its effective use of text and minimal imagery to indirectly convey a "richly nasty" setting in a short runtime. Drew Onia of Adventure Game Hotspot gave the game a score of 79%, praising the concept, storytelling, and atmosphere. Jessica Conditt of Engadget praised the satisfying puzzles and noted that the characters, interface, and soundtrack combined for a highly immersive experience.

== See also ==
- Pi (1998)
