= Jo Giese =

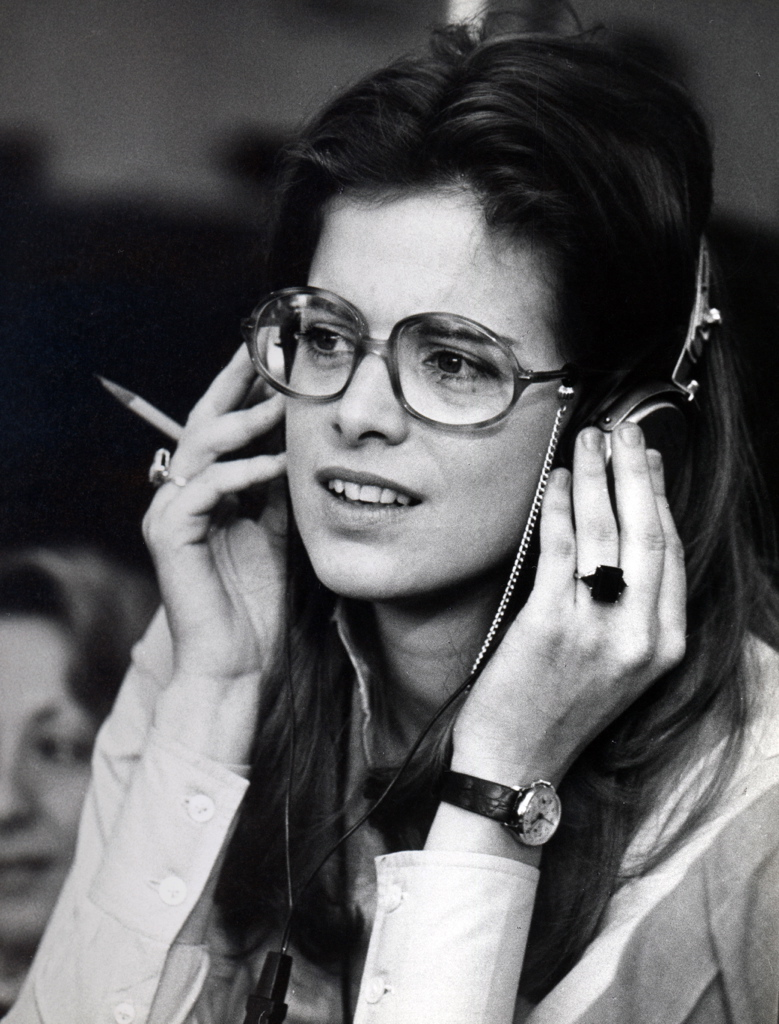
- Born: January 14, 1947 (age 79)
- Occupations: Journalist, Radio Correspondent
- Writing career
- Genres: Non-fiction, public radio
- Website: www.jogiese.com

Jo Giese (born January 14, 1947) is an American non-fiction author, essayist, and award-winning radio journalist. As a special correspondent, she was part of the Peabody Award-winning team at Marketplace, public radio’s daily business show. Her series Breaking the Mold, which featured women succeeding in male-dominated career fields, ran for three years, and won an EMMA—Exceptional Merit Media Award—for Exceptional Radio Story from the National Women’s Political Caucus, and a GRACIE for the “superior portrayal of the changing roles of women” from the Foundation of American Women in Radio and TV.

== Career ==
=== Books and publications ===
Giese authored The Good Food Compendium (Doubleday, 1981), A Woman’s Path (Golden/St Martin’s, 1998), and Never Sit If You Can Dance: Lessons from My Mother (She Writes Press, 2016), life lessons she learned from Babe, her mother.

Her writing has appeared in the New York Times, The Los Angeles Times, The Los Angeles Review of Books, Vogue, Ms, UTNE, LA Weekly, New Woman, European Travel & Life, BARK, and Montana Outdoors.

=== Radio ===
As a special correspondent Giese was part of the Peabody-award-winning team at Marketplace, public radio’s daily business show.

Her 33-part series Breaking the Mold, which featured woman succeeding in male-dominated career fields, ran for three years and was Marketplace’s longest-running series. For this series, Giese won an EMMA —Exceptional Merit Media Award (2002)—for Exceptional Radio Story from the National Women’s Political Caucus.

For her “superior portrayal of the changing roles of women,” Giese received a GRACIE (2001) from the Foundation of American Women in Radio and TV.

For This American Life with Ira Glass Giese contributed a half-hour documentary Doctoring the Doctor. This is the intimate story of Giese caring for her husband, a doctor, in a hospital she set up in their living room for the last year of his life.

=== Community activism ===
As Founder and President of the MalibuGreenMachine Giese helped raise $750,000 for a landscaping project on Pacific Coast Highway in Malibu. For this she was honored by the Malibu Times as 2005 Citizen of the Year, and was honored in 2008 with a Malibu Way of Life Award.

In the 90s, as part of the Venice Action Committee, she spearheaded a community effort to plant trees in Venice, California on Rose Avenue. The mature trees, from Main Street to Lincoln Blvd, remain to this day.
