= Split: A Divided America =

- Directed by: Kelly Nyks
- Written by: Peter D. Hutchison; Kelly Nyks
- Produced by: Jeff Beard; Peter D. Hutchison; Kelly Nyks; Jared P. Scott
- Starring: Tucker Carlson; Al Franken; Norman Ornstein
- Cinematography: Tarina Van Den Driessche
- Edited by: Jared P. Scott
- Music by: Malcolm Francis
- Production company: PF Pictures
- Distributed by: Feature Presentations
- Release date: April 1, 2008
- Running time: 90 minutes
- Country: United States
- Language: English

Split: A Divided America is a documentary film about partisan divides in American society. It examines perceived political divides between red and blue states, Conservatives and Liberals, and Republicans and Democrats from the perspective of cultural factors, including religion, urbanization, race, wealth, the modern media, contemporary campaigning strategies, and the "deterioration of civil discourse in our political experience".

Kelly Nyks directed, co-wrote, and co-produced the film with co-writer Peter Hutchison and Jeff Beard. The cast includes several real life political and media figures, including Bruce Bartlett, Tucker Carlson, Noam Chomsky, Thomas Frank, Al Franken, Jesse Jackson, Sharon Pratt Kelly, Norm Ornstein, Robert Putnam, and others.

The documentary was broadcast domestically on the Independent Film Channel (IFC) and was distributed to classrooms nationwide in collaboration with the National Association of Secondary School Principals (NASSP) and the National Council for the Social Studies (NCSS).

== Awards ==
- Jury Award, Best Documentary Feature at First Take Film Festival
- Audience Favorite Award, Best Documentary Feature at Riverside International Film Festival
- Best Political Documentary Feature at the Connecticut Film Festiva]
- Audience Favorite, Hulu Awards
- Target 10 Jury Prize Nominee, AFI Dallas International Film Festival

== Official festival selections ==
AFI Dallas International Film Festival, Sarasota Film Festival, Gloria Film Festival, Connecticut Film Festival, Berkshire International Film Festival, First Take Film Festival, Riverside International Film Festival, deadCENTER Film Festival, Sacramento Film Festival, Mexico City Documentary Film Festival, TallGrass Film Festival, We The People Film Festival, Cinesol Film Festival

== Reviews ==
Cinematical - review by Peter Martin
"Walking a veritable tightrope between red and blue states, Nyks travels across the country, talking to a wide cross-section of random citizens, party leaders, political celebrities and media pundits. He winds up with a sincere, thoughtful inquiry into the neuroses of a fractured nation.”

Moving Pictures Magazine - review by Elliot V. Kotek
“Journalists, civil libertarians and evangelists each get their say and Nyks, by serving up the information in bite-sized topical chunks, keeps the conversations tight and on point. By mixing the media with superb graphic animation, film clips and narrated cheat sheets that help keep track of historical context, Nyks not only helps us digest the discourse, but forces us to enjoy it. “

== Interviewees ==
- Al Franken
- Norm Ornstein
- Jesse Jackson
- Noam Chomsky
- Amy Goodman
- Thomas Frank
- Nicholas Kristof
- Bruce Bartlett
- Doug Bailey
- Robert Putnam
- Sheila Jackson Lee
- Jack Hitt
- Ted Rall
- Mark Green
