= Said Fazal Akbar =

Afghani politician

Said Fazal Akbar was the first governor of Kunar province in Afghanistan after the fall of the Taliban in 2001. He was an ex-Mujahideen who was running a clothing store in Oakland, California when he was appointed Governor by President Hamid Karzai. His governorship is chronicled in the book by his son, Hyder Akbar, "Come Back to Afghanistan, A California Teenager's Story"

Preceded by None	Governor of Kunar Province, Afghanistan; 2001-2005	Succeeded by Assadullah Wafa
