= Lee Sandlin =

American reviewer, journalist, and essayist

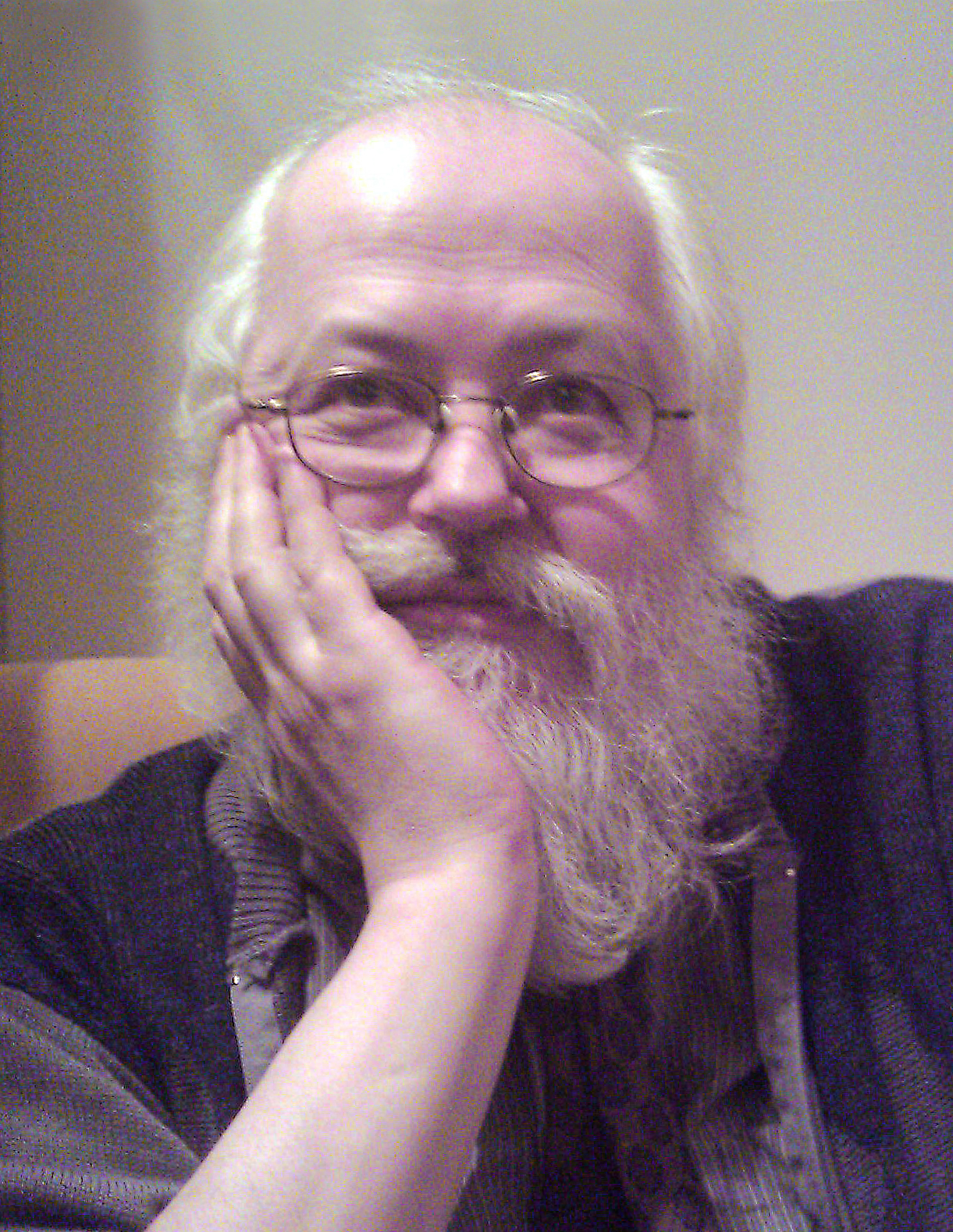
- Lee Sandlin in March 2012
- Born: August 15, 1956; Wildwood, Illinois, U.S.
- Died: December 14, 2014 (aged 58); Chicago, Illinois, U.S.
- Occupations: Journalist; reviewer
- Spouse: Nina Sandlin (m. 1985)
- Writing career
- Language: English
- Website: www.leesandlin.com

Lee Sandlin (August 15, 1956 – December 14, 2014) was an American Chicago-based journalist and essayist. Primarily associated with the Chicago Reader, Sandlin also contributed book reviews to the Wall Street Journal, reviewing books dealing with, among others, Thomas De Quincey, Robert Heinlein, Pauline Kael, and World War II-era novelist James Jones.

== Early life ==
Sandlin was born in Wildwood, Illinois, and grew up in the Chicago suburbs of Evanston and Winnetka. His father, a Korean War Air Force pilot, was involved in the construction of new subdivisions, which he later wrote about in his essay “The American Scheme.” He attended New Trier High School and then briefly the University of Chicago and Roosevelt University before leaving school to hitch-hike around the country. After settling in Chicago he worked for several years at Booksellers Row, a used-book store, before turning to writing full-time.

== Career ==
He wrote primarily for the Chicago Reader, where he was for many years the TV critic, writing reviews also on opera and classical music. He was known for a breadth of interests and is best remembered for his longer historical essays.

== Notable essays ==
Among Sandlin's most notable works is "Losing the War", a 1997 essay subtitled "World War II has faded into movies, anecdotes, and archives that nobody cares about anymore. Are we finally losing the war?" The piece is used in university syllabuses, and it is cited in discussions of WWII as well as broader concepts such as war, memory, sports, project management, and manliness. In 2001, a segment was adapted for broadcast by the public radio show This American Life and later anthologized by host Ira Glass in the 2007 collection The New Kings of Nonfiction.

Sandlin's memoir, The Distancers, appeared in the Chicago Reader as a 12-part serial in the spring and summer of 2004. It chronicled the American Midwest of several generations through the family history of the aunts and uncles with whom Lee spent summers as a boy in a small house in Edwardsville, Illinois.

Wicked River, a narrative history of the Mississippi River in the 19th century, was published in 2010 by Pantheon Books. Garrison Keillor called it “A gripping book that plunges you into a rich dark stretch of visceral history. I read it in two sittings and got up shaken.” Its account of the civilian experience of the Siege of Vicksburg was adapted as an article in the quarterly Journal of Military History.

== Personal life and death ==
Sandlin was working on another book when he died suddenly at his home in 2014.

== Selected publications ==
- Sandlin, Lee (2010). Wicked River: The Mississippi When It Last Ran Wild. New York: Pantheon. ISBN 978-0307378514.
- Sandlin, Lee (2013). Storm Kings: The Untold History of America's First Tornado Chasers. New York: Pantheon. ISBN 978-0307378521.
- Sandlin, Lee (2013). The Distancers: An American Memoir. New York: Vintage. ISBN 978-0345806765.
- Glass, Ira (2007). The New Kings of Nonfiction. New York: Riverhead Books. ISBN 978-1594482670.
