= Veronica Chater =

American writer

- Born: San Jose, California
- Children: 3
- Writing career
- Language: English

Veronica Chater is an American author and memoirist. Chater wrote a memoir of her childhood, Waiting for the Apocalypse: A Memoir of Faith and Family, highlighting her father's obsession with traditional Catholicism and belief in a coming holy chastisement, and her ever-growing family's consequential spiral into poverty.

Chater was one of nine children; She currently lives in Berkeley, California.

== See also ==
- Atheist Film Festival
