= Scott Carrier =

American novelist

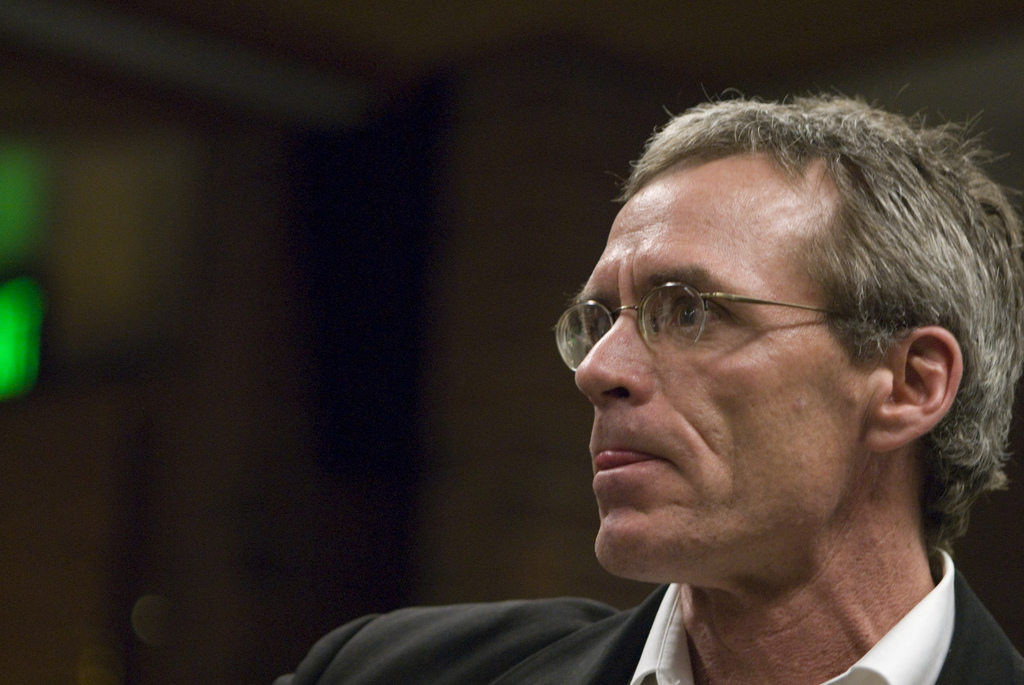
Scott Carrier

Scott Carrier is an American author, radio producer, and educator. He lives in Salt Lake City, Utah. His second book, Prisoner of Zion, was published in April 2013. He is a former assistant professor in the Department of Communication at Utah Valley University.

== Written work ==
- Prisoner of Zion: Muslims, Mormons and Other Misadventures (ISBN 978-1619021211)
- Running After Antelope (ISBN 1-58243-179-5)
- "Over There" from The Best American Travel Writing 2003 (ISBN 978-0618390748) originally featured in Harper's Magazine
- "Rock the Junta" from The Best American Nonrequired Reading 2007 (ISBN 978-0618902811) originally featured in Mother Jones

== Radio work ==
Carrier's pieces have been featured on radio programs, including This American Life since 1996, The Savvy Traveler, Marketplace, Day to Day, All Things Considered, and NPR's Hearing Voices. In 2015, Carrier began producing a podcast entitled "Home of the Brave". The podcast combines original stories with work that previously aired on NPR and other radio shows.

=== Contributions to This American Life ===
- Episode 12, segment The Moment Humans Stopped Being Animals, 1996 (rebroadcast in episode 49)
- Episode 21, segment Religious Faction, 1996
- Episode 35, Fall Clearance Stories, haiku stories, 1996
- Episode 37, segment The Test, 1996 (rebroadcast in episode 181)
- Episode 40, segment Swimming Lesson, 1996
- Episode 42, segment Finding Amnesia, 1996
- Episode 45, segment Whoring in Commercial Radio News, 1996 (rebroadcast as The Friendly Man in episode 181)
- Episode 48, segment Kids, 1997
- Episode 49, segment The Moment Humans Stopped Being Animals, 1997 (rebroadcast)
- Episode 53, segment Parent and Child, 1997
- Episode 64, segment On the Green River, 1997
- Episode 77, segment Kings, 1997
- Episode 80, segment Running After Antelope, 1997
- Episode 96, segment Book of Job, 1998
- Episode 113, segment Pot of Gold, 1998
- Episode 141, segment More Powerful Than a Locomotive, 1999
- Episode 146, segment Church of Latter Day Snakes, 1999
- Episode 181, The Friendly Man, with segments The Test (rebroadcast), The Friendly Man (rebroadcast), Who Am I? What Am I Doing Here?, and The Day Mom and Dad Fell in Love, 2001. Entire show rebroadcast April 24, 2009.
- Episode 191, segment Just Three Thousand More Miles to the Beach, 2001
- Episode 195, segment Are You Ready?, 2001
- Episode 241, segment No of Course I Know You, 2003
- Episode 243, segment The Hiker and the Cowman Should be Friends, 2003
- Episode 286, segment Invisible Girl, 2005
- Episode 333, segment Am not. Are too. Am not. Are too., 2007
- Episode 551, segment The Test., 2015

== Awards ==
In 2006 Carrier won a Peabody Award for a story titled "Crossing Borders" which was aired on Hearing Voices on NPR.

In 2009 Carrier won a Fellow Award from United States Artists.
