= Brent Runyon =

American writer (born 1977)

Brent Runyon (or Brenner) (born 1977) is a contemporary writer for young adults. He has written three books. The first is a memoir, The Burn Journals (2004); the other two are novels, Maybe (2006), and Surface Tension: A Novel in Four Summers (2009). The Burn Journals has been nominated for a Georgia Peach Award for Young Readers.

Runyon was 14 years old when he attempted to kill himself. He did this by undressing, pouring gasoline on his robe, putting his robe on, and setting his robe on fire. He suffered third-degree-burns on 85% of his body. His first book, The Burn Journals, is a memoir of his suicide survival. He is a regular contributor to public radio's This American Life, and lives in Cape Cod, Massachusetts with his wife and three stepchildren.

== The Burn Journals ==
Brent Runyon's first book, The Burn Journals, is a memoir of his suicide survival. Runyon started writing the book on February 4, 2001, exactly ten years after the day he set himself on fire. Originally, the book began as a way to let go of his past, but when he was finished he decided to publish it with the title The Burn Journals. The memoir describes one year of Runyon's life, in which he starts out as an eighth grader and begins high school.

There are three main settings for the story, and the book is divided into five parts, three of which being Runyon's home town of Falls Church, Virginia. The first hospital that Brent is taken to is the Children's National Medical Center in Washington, D.C., where he received most of his intensive care in the Burn Unit. After being in the hospital for over 4 months, Runyon was sent to the Alfred I. duPont Institute in Wilmington, Delaware. The duPont Institute was a rehab hospital in which Brent spent about 3 months. The story takes place from February 4, 1991, to January 26, 1992.

The Burn Journals is the true autobiographical story of Brent Runyon. Told from the perspective of his 14-year-old mind, the story begins as he comes home from school one day and decides that killing himself is better than facing the disappointment of his parents. He puts on his robe, soaked in gasoline, and sets himself on fire, immediately regretting his decision. He walks out the bathroom door and his brother runs to call 911, rushing Brent to the hospital as soon as possible. The story follows Runyon through his treatments, stays at different hospitals and rehabilitation centers, therapist after therapist, and gradual recovery. The narrative offers insight into Brent's head, showing the reader his thoughts and feelings on everything he experiences. The story also focuses on the love of his parents, and the way Runyon realizes that he has so much to live for. Brent gradually gets over his depression and grows and learns from everything that happens to him. One major theme of the book is being accepting of yourself as you grow up, and learning to appreciate life. Another major theme of the book is the innate will of people to survive and fight against things holding them back.

Brent Runyon is the main character, protagonist, and narrator in his story. He experiences major depression in the beginning of the book, but gradually learns to accept himself.
