= David Rakoff =

Canadian-American humorist and essayist (1964–2012)

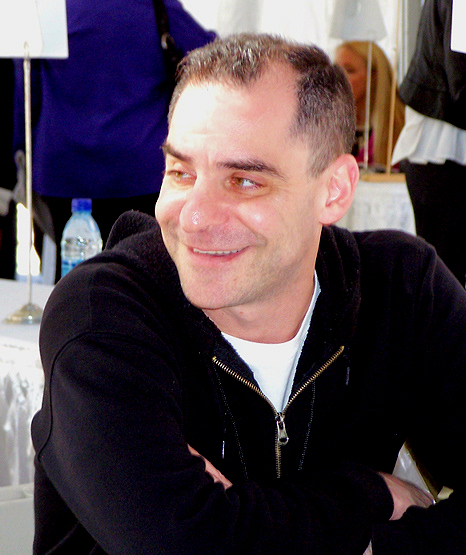
- Rakoff at the 2006 Texas Book Festival
- Born: David Benjamin Rakoff; November 27, 1964; Montreal, Quebec, Canada
- Died: August 9, 2012 (aged 47); New York City, U.S.
- Education: Columbia University
- Occupations: Essayist; journalist; actor
- Relatives: Simon Rakoff (brother)
- Writing career
- Years active: 1986–2012

David Benjamin Rakoff (November 27, 1964 – August 9, 2012) was a Canadian-American essayist and humorist, born in Montreal and raised in Toronto, who spent his professional career in New York City. Rakoff was an essayist, journalist, and actor, and a regular contributor to WBEZ's This American Life. He described himself as a "New York writer" who also happened to be a "Canadian writer", a "mega Jewish writer", a "gay writer", and an "East Asian Studies major who has forgotten most of his Japanese" writer.

== Early life and education ==
David Rakoff was born in Montreal, Quebec, Canada, the youngest of three children. His brother, the comedian Simon Rakoff, is four years older than David. Their sister, Ruth Rakoff, author of the cancer memoir When My World Was Very Small, is the middle child. Rakoff and his siblings were close as children. Rakoff's mother, Gina Shochat-Rakoff, is a doctor who has practised psychotherapy and his father, Vivian Rakoff, is a psychiatrist. Rakoff wrote that almost every generation of his family fled from one place to another. Rakoff's grandparents, who were Jewish, fled Latvia and Lithuania at the turn of the 20th century and settled in South Africa. The Rakoff family left South Africa in 1961, for political reasons, and moved to Montreal for seven years. In 1967, when he was three, Rakoff's family relocated to Toronto. As an adult, he identified as Jewish.

Rakoff attended high school at the Forest Hill Collegiate Institute, and graduated in 1982. That year, he moved to New York City to attend Columbia University, where he majored in East Asian Studies and studied dance. Rakoff spent his third year of college at the School of Oriental and African Studies in London and graduated in 1986. He worked in Japan as a translator with a fine arts publisher. His work was interrupted after four months when, at age 22, he contracted Hodgkin's disease, a form of lymphatic cancer he referred to as "a touch of cancer". He returned to Toronto for 18 months of treatment, including chemotherapy, radiation, and surgery. Rakoff later served on the board of directors of North Carolina's John C. Campbell Folk School.

== Writing ==
=== Early career ===
Before becoming a full-time writer, Rakoff worked for 13 years in the publishing industry, including as a publishing assistant and a publicist. He worked at a literary agency for 3 years and then as an editor and communications manager for 9 years at HarperCollins. For a period starting when he was 25, Rakoff wrote freelance while working in the publishing industry. Eventually he was able to earn a living from his writing, becoming a full-time writer in 1998. While Rakoff was working in publishing, he wrote Q and A interviews entitled "The Way We Live Now", which appeared in The New York Times Magazine from 1999 to 2002.

=== Role of David Sedaris and Ira Glass in Rakoff's career ===
Rakoff said that he owed David Sedaris and Sedaris' producer, Ira Glass, his entire career. Rakoff wrote to Sedaris in 1992, after hearing him read on the radio his essay, "Santaland Diaries", about being a Christmas elf, which was to make him famous. That day, Rakoff wrote to Sedaris immediately to ask if he could publish Sedaris' works (which he later confessed he had no intention of doing, since he was desperate to leave publishing). They became friends, with Rakoff doing work in the theatre with Sedaris, first directing a play written by Sedaris and his sister Amy Sedaris, and later acting in their plays. Through Sedaris, Rakoff met Ira Glass, who was then a junior reporter on the NPR radio program Morning Edition. When Glass began This American Life, Rakoff became involved with the new show at its inception. Sedaris encouraged Rakoff to go on public radio, where Sedaris himself had achieved fame: at his urging Rakoff took work to This American Life, starting with "Christmas Freud", an account of Rakoff's job impersonating Sigmund Freud in the window of Barneys department store during the holidays.

=== Journalism ===
David Rakoff was a freelance writer whose work appeared regularly in publications including Condé Nast Traveler, GQ, Outside Magazine, and The New York Times Magazine. His essays and articles were also featured in Business 2.0, Details, Harper's Bazaar, Nerve, New York Magazine, Salon, Seed, Slate, Spin, The New York Observer, Vogue, Wired, and numerous other outlets. Throughout his career, he wrote on a wide and eclectic range of topics.

=== Published books of essays ===
Rakoff published three bestselling collections of essays, which include his own illustrations. Both Fraud (Doubleday 2001) and Don't Get Too Comfortable (Doubleday 2005) were awarded a Lambda literary award (which recognises excellence among LGBT writers who use their work to explore LGBT lives), both times in the "Humor" category. Half-Empty (2010) won the 2011 Thurber Prize for American Humor.

==== Fraud ====
Fraud includes essays that are largely autobiographical and humorous. Rakoff stated, in relation to the theme of the book, "The central drama of my life is about being a fraud, alas." He went on to say "That's a complete lie, really; the central drama of my life is about being lonely, and staying thin, but fraudulence gets a fair amount of play." He has said that he thought of other titles for Fraud, like "Smart mouth" and "The jig is up". Rakoff described the first-person essays that comprise the collection as more inwardly focused than his later work. The work contains material from public radio's This American Life and from Outside and Salon, which was significantly lengthened and re-written, as well as a few new pieces.

The book received praise from many critics, garnering near-unanimous acclaim. In a review Publishers Weekly wrote that "a talented new humorist springs onto the scene: Rakoff has a rapier wit, slashing in all directions with slice-of-life insights and cutting remarks, sometimes nicking himself with self-deprecation in his dexterous duel with the American experience." Kevin Cowherd said that in the book, Rakoff "makes a strong bid for the title of Most Neurotic Man on the Planet, and the results are absolutely hilarious – when they're not achingly revealing and tinged with sadness." Max Magee called the collection a "meta-article in which he talks about the particulars and relative merits of his assignment as he embarks on that assignment" and that "the reader feels invited in for a behind the scenes look at what it is like to be a disaffected, overly-qualified, under-ambitious journalist as he takes on his fluffy assignments." David Bahr calls Fraud "witty, insightful and typically bittersweet."

Other reviews of the book and audio-book were mixed. The reviewer in The New York Times mentioned (by way of criticism) that Sophocles and Freud had pursued the same idea that forms the book's focus, that is, that we are defined by our fears. Greil Marcus said Rakoff's stories are not as funny as those he read on the radio.

==== Don't Get Too Comfortable ====
Don't Get Too Comfortable, which is subtitled "The Indignities of Coach Class, The Torments of Low Thread Count, The Never-Ending Quest for Artisanal Olive Oil, and Other First World Problems" was published in 2005 and also consists of comical autobiographical essays. Some of the essays were originally published in shorter form elsewhere and some original. The over-riding theme of the articles is the absurdity and excessiveness in American life: the book is about luxuries and privileges being treated as deserved rights. Rakoff said that the moral of the book is that there should be "a little more guilt out there" and "we could all, myself included, count our blessings, acknowledge our privileges." The book was generally praised by critics. The New York Times said, "Rarely have greed, vanity, selfishness, and vapidity been so mercilessly and wittily portrayed". Emily Gordon says that in his "bursts of pure enthusiasm, he's a delectable Cole Porter, Nicholson Baker and Sarah Vowell smoothie". However, Rakoff was criticised in The Washington Post for misusing the word "like", with the reviewer suggesting that Rakoff's prose could use tightening. In The New York Times, Jennifer 8. Lee said the book was "no more than a collection of vaguely related magazine pieces" rather than "a coherent seriocomic manifesto", that some essays were off-theme, and not about narcissism and excess.

==== Half Empty ====
David Rakoff talks about Half Empty on Bookbits radio.

A third book of essays, Half Empty was published in September 2010. Rakoff said the book is "essentially about pessimism and melancholy: all the other less than pleasant to feel emotions that because they are less than pleasant to feel have been more or less stricken from the public discourse but in fact have their uses and even a certain beauty to them". The book won the 2011 Thurber Prize for American Humor.

=== Contributions to anthologies ===
Rakoff contributed essays to the following anthologies of non-fiction published by other writers:

- "My first New York" in My First New York: Early Adventures in the Big City (As Remembered by Actors, Artists, Athletes, Chefs, Comedians, Filmmakers, Mayors, Models, Moguls, Porn Stars, Rockers, Writers, and Others) (2010) (edited by New York Magazine) (2008) (See extract here)
- "Utah" in State by State: a panoramic portrait of America (2008) (edited by Matt Weiland and Sean Wilsey) (See extract here)
- "Streets of sorrow" in The Best American Travel Writing 2007 (2007) (edited by Susan Orlean) (See extract here)
- "Love it or Leave it" in The Best American Non-required Reading 2006 (2006) (edited by Dave Eggers) (See extract here)
- "Barbra's farewell: A city Verklempt" in Da Capo Best Music Writing 2001 (edited by Nick Hornby and Ben Schafer) (See original article here)
- "My sister of perpetual mercy" in A Member of the Family: gay men write about their families (1992) (edited by John Preston)
- "Christmas Freud" in The Dreaded Feast: writers on enduring the holidays (2009) (edited by Michele Clarke and Taylor Plimpton)
- The Autobiographer's Handbook: The 826 National Guide to Writing Your Memoir (edited by Jennifer Traig and Dave Eggers)

Rakoff contributed fiction pieces to the following anthologies:

- "Sagrada family" in Men on men 5: best new gay fiction (1994) (edited by David Bergman)
- Interview as a child prodigy in The infant mind transcript/The infinite mind (published by Lichtenstein Creative Media).

=== Posthumous publication ===
On July 16, 2013, Rakoff's novel in verse "Love, Dishonor, Marry, Die, Cherish, Perish: A Novel" was published by Doubleday. Shortly before his death he recorded it as an audio-book with the help of Ira Glass in the studio of This American Life

=== Radio essays ===
Rakoff was a regular contributor to the radio program This American Life on Public Radio International, in which each week writers and performers contribute pieces (some documentary, some fiction) on a chosen topic, usually in the first person. The first was "Christmas Freud", an account of Rakoff's impersonating Sigmund Freud in the window of Barneys department store during the holidays. The piece appears in Fraud, his first collection published in 2001. He says that This American Life let him have his own take on things and break the bounds of just being a journalist. Most of his radio performances were recorded in the studio, but some were performed live. Rakoff was the first person to host a This American Life episode in place of Ira Glass (the episode being "Like It Or Not"), followed only by Nancy Updike. He appeared in This American Life: Live! (2008) but was cut from 2009 version (the video with Dave Hill is available on the internet. Rakoff was featured on This American Life's live broadcast, "Invisible Made Visible" on May 10, 2012, from the Skirball Theater, NYU.. He returned to the Canadian airwaves with his regular appearances on CBC Radio's Talking Books, hosted by Ian Brown. After that, Rakoff was also frequently heard on the CBC radio program WireTap. The August 17, 2012, episode of This American Life, titled "Our Friend David," was dedicated entirely to his essays on the program.

=== Screenplays ===
Rakoff adapted the screenplay for the Academy Award winning short film The New Tenants, originally written by Anders Thomas Jensen. The director Joachim Back described Rakoff's role as having "helped me with the dialogue" and having "collaborated a lot on the dialogue". He also appears in the film. The film won the 2010 Oscar for best live action short film. Rakoff sold what he called a "meta screenplay", written with Dave Hill, based on a fictitious tour to publicize the book Don't Get Too Comfortable. In a short film based on the same story, Rakoff played a high-maintenance author opposite Dave Hill's patient, accommodating publicist.

== Acting and voice work ==
Rakoff said that his first career choice was to be an actor: he wrote, "like generations of other misfits before me, be they morphological, sexual or otherwise, I decided that I would make theatre my refuge". Rakoff performed in the theatre at university and acted while working full-time in the publishing industry and later while freelancing as a writer. For instance, he performed at the first US Comedy Arts Festival in 1995 in a play written by a friend. He has said that he likes acting because it involves other people, unlike writing. However, his self-assessment of his acting ability was "as it turns out, I'm a deeply uncompelling camera presence".

Despite his ambitions as a child, he said that he only pursued acting half-heartedly, partly because his family was against him being an actor and partly because of the stereotyping that unimaginative casting agents engage in. Rakoff has characterised most of the roles that he auditioned for as "Fudgy McPacker" or "Jewy McHebrew" (to which he later added "Classy McSophisticate"). Fudgy McPacker is a stereotypically gay character, who is either supercilious or the loveable queen and Jewy McHebrew is the prototypical Jewish part, involving a careworn, inquiring, furrowed browed, bookish type. Rakoff said that he has continued with his theatre work, since such acting stereotypes are not so prevalent in stage work, because audiences are more sophisticated, and there is not as much money at stake, meaning that there is not such risk-averse casting. He has also noted that, as a writer, being gay and being Jewish does not limit his readership or the subjects he can write about in the way it limits his acting roles.

=== Film ===
Rakoff appeared in several films, although he noted that almost invariably his part is left on the cutting room floor: "I've been cut out of some very august projects." For instance, he worked on The First Wives' Club (1996), but his scenes were deleted in favour of Bronson Pinchot's. Rakoff's first major film role was in A cloud in trousers, a short film by Gregg Bordowitz (1995) which appeared on public television, with Rakoff playing Vladimir Mayakovsky on whose poetry the film was based. His subsequent film appearances include performances as a librarian in Cheryl Dunyé's film The Watermelon Woman (1996), an appearance by the back of his head as Ben Baron, who is dismissive to Harper Lee, in Bennett Miller's Capote (2005), a non-speaking role as Boswell in Paul Dinello's Strangers with Candy (2005) (which was co-written by Amy Sedaris), and roles as a publishing boss in Bad Bosses Go to Hell (1997) and as a duplicitous director in Alison MacLean's film Intolerable.

Rakoff can be seen in the Academy Award winning short film The New Tenants (2009). In the film he plays Frank, half of a gay couple who move into an apartment that was vacated unexpectedly. The film begins with Rakoff delivering a bitter, humorous but pessimistic monologue on life and death. Rakoff also adapted the screenplay for the film.

Rakoff appeared as himself in the documentary Florent: Queen of the Meat Market (2009) about a local restaurant and in a film about the book State by State (2008), in which one of his essays is published.

=== Television ===
Rakoff appeared as modelling agent Rich Tuchman in As the World Turns, a television soap opera. He wrote about that experience in the essay "Lather, Rinse, Repeat", published in the collection Fraud. He also appeared as Todd in Cosby (1996–2000) and as Frank in the TV show Snake 'n' Bacon (2009).

=== Stage ===
Rakoff acted in the theater, including off-Broadway, notably in plays written by The Talent Family (David and Amy Sedaris). Those plays included the Obie award-winning One Woman Shoe (1995), in relation to which a critic writing in Newsday said that Rakoff "exuded quirky appeal", The New York Times said both that Rakoff was "hilarious" and that he delivered "a droll, impeccably sustained performance providing the necessary anchor". Rakoff also appeared in the Sedaris's The Little Freida Mysteries at La Mama (1997), of which The New York Times said Rakoff was part of a "deft ensemble", and which received a good review in Newsday. and in The Book of Liz (2001), in which he played various characters, including Nathaniel Brightbee, a member of a crypto-Amish order called "The Squeamish", who takes over Amy Sedaris's cheese ball operation. His performances were highly regarded by some critics. Rakoff portrayed Lance Loud on stage and appeared in other plays including "David & Jodi & David and Jackie", inspired by the 1960s classic Bob & Carol & Ted & Alice, alongside Jackie Hoffman, David Ilku and Jodi Lennon and "The Cartells". He also delivered a monologue about being fired in the stage show Fired!.

=== Voice work ===
The Canadian-born Rakoff voiced the part of the US President Thomas Jefferson for the audio book of Jon Stewart's America (The Book): A Citizen's Guide to Democracy Inaction and provided the voice of Polish-American Leon Czolgosz (the assassin of US President William McKinley) in the audio book version of Sarah Vowell's Assassination Vacation.

Rakoff was in the voice cast of the 2009 Williams Street animated pilot Snake 'n' Bacon. Based on the creations of American cartoonist and illustrator Michael Kupperman, it aired on Cartoon Network's Adult Swim channel.

=== Directing ===
In 1994, Rakoff directed Stitches, by David and Amy Sedaris. His direction was described as "clearly focused" by The New York Times and "brisk" by Newsday. He also directed Jail Babes starring The Duelling Bankheads (David Ilku and Clark Render) at La Mama, E.T.C. in 1996, and Mike Albo's one-man show, Spray, at P.S. 122 in New York City.

== Personal life ==
=== Green card and citizenship ===
From 1982, Rakoff lived in the United States (minus his four-month stay in Japan in 1986), first as a student, then as a resident alien. In the early 1990s he was issued a green card, a subject about which he wrote in one of his early newspaper articles. After living in the United States for 21 years, Rakoff was motivated by a desire to participate in the political process and applied for U.S. citizenship. Rakoff chronicled the experience of becoming an American citizen in an essay published in Don't Get Too Comfortable. He became a U.S. citizen in 2003, while at the same time retaining his Canadian citizenship.

=== Illness and death ===
In 2010, while writing the book Half Empty, Rakoff was diagnosed with a malignant tumor, and later developed a post-radiation sarcoma - a result of an ineffective treatment for Hodgkin's lymphoma in his 20s - behind his left collarbone and began chemotherapy. He died in Manhattan on August 9, 2012.
