= Jack Hitt =

American author

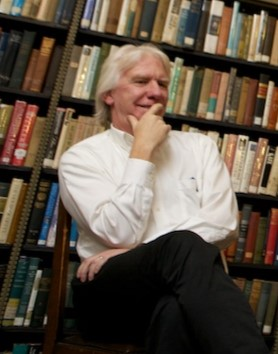
- Born: 1957 (age 68–69); Charleston, South Carolina, U.S.
- Citizenship: United States
- Education: The University of The South
- Occupations: Author, editor, journalist
- Spouse: Lisa Sanders
- Children: 2
- Writing career
- Language: English
- Notable awards: Livingston Award, two Peabody Awards

Jack Hitt is an American author. He has been a contributing editor to Harper's, The New York Times Magazine, This American Life, and the now-defunct magazine Lingua Franca. His work has appeared in such publications as Outside Magazine, Rolling Stone, Wired, Mother Jones, Slate, and Garden & Gun.

In 1990, he received the Livingston Award, along with Paul Tough, for an article they wrote about computer hackers that was published in Esquire. Hitt has written and edited multiple books, and has had articles selected for inclusion in Best American Science Writing 2006, Best American Travel Writing 2005, and in Ira Glass's The New Kings of Nonfiction (2007). In 2006, an episode of This American Life that Hitt contributed to called "Habeus Schmabeus" won a Peabody Award. Hitt also co-hosted the Gimlet Media Podcast Uncivil along with Chenjerai Kumanyika between 2017 and 2018. Uncivil won a Peabody award in 2017 for the episode titled "The Raid".

== Biography ==
=== Personal life ===
John T. L. "Jack" Hitt was born in 1957 in Charleston, South Carolina to Ann Leonard Hitt and Robert Hitt Jr. He was the youngest of five children. He was raised in Charleston and attended the Porter-Gaud School. At Porter-Gaude, Hitt got his start in writing by contributing to and editing the school's literary magazine. Hitt grew up in Charleston.

Hitt attended the University of the South in Sewanee, Tennessee where he majored in comparative literature. As an undergrad, he worked at the Learning Disabilities Center and taught math and English to teens and children. He also tutored Latin. He was president of the Spanish House and a member of the Spanish Honor Society.

It was at Sewanee that Hitt first heard about the road to Santiago de Compostela. He would write about the experience of walking the road in his first book, Off The Road: A Modern-Day Walk Down the Pilgrim's route into Spain.

Hitt graduated from the University of the South in 1979.

"I was nearly a Latin professor", said Hitt in an interview with The Atlantic. "Upon graduation, my Classics teacher warned me that while I'd read the hundred or so greatest works of Latin literature, post-graduate work meant reading the 1,000 'eh' works of Latin literature...I seized my diploma and I've never translated a line of Latin since."

Hitt lived in an apartment in New York City for about 8 years before he met and married his current wife Lisa Sanders in the late 1980s. They live together in New Haven, Connecticut and have two daughters.

Jack Hitt's older brother Robert M. Hitt III served as Secretary of Commerce for the state of South Carolina from January 2011 to June 2021.

=== Writing and journalism career ===
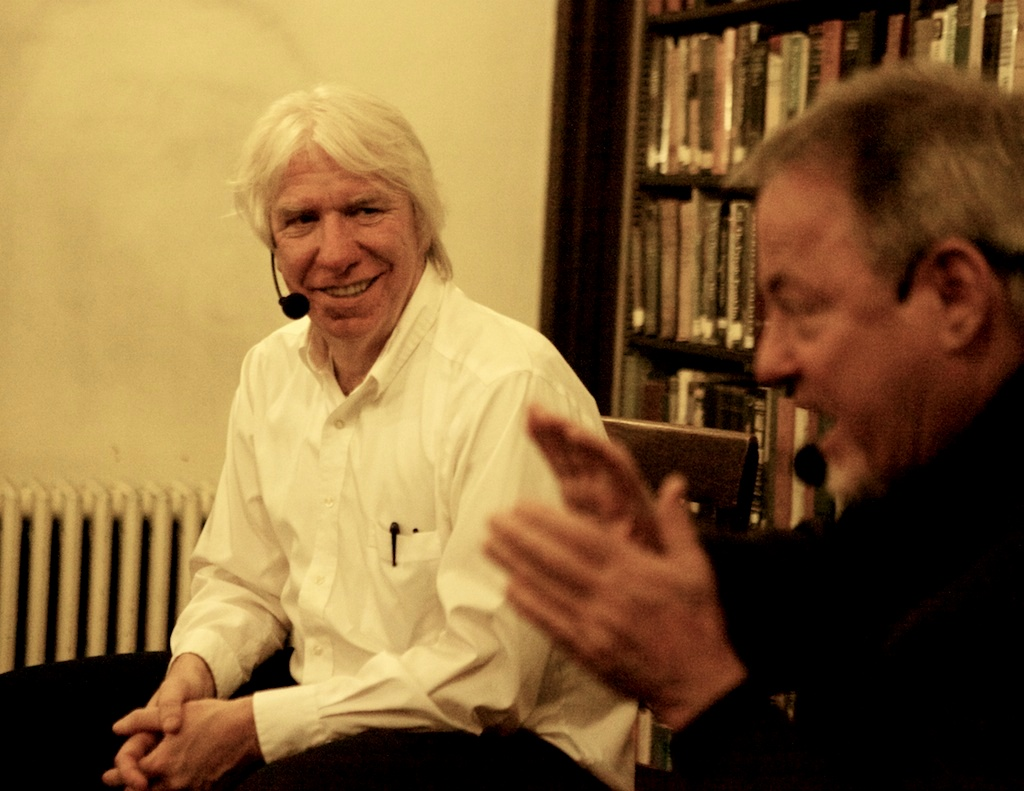
Jack Hitt, Mark Edward New Haven Connecticut, November 2013

Hitt has been a contributing editor to Harper's, The New York Times Magazine, This American Life, and Lingua Franca. He has also had articles published in Mother Jones, Slate, the Smithsonian, Discover Magazine, Rolling Stone, GQ, Wired, Garden & Gun, and Outside Magazine.

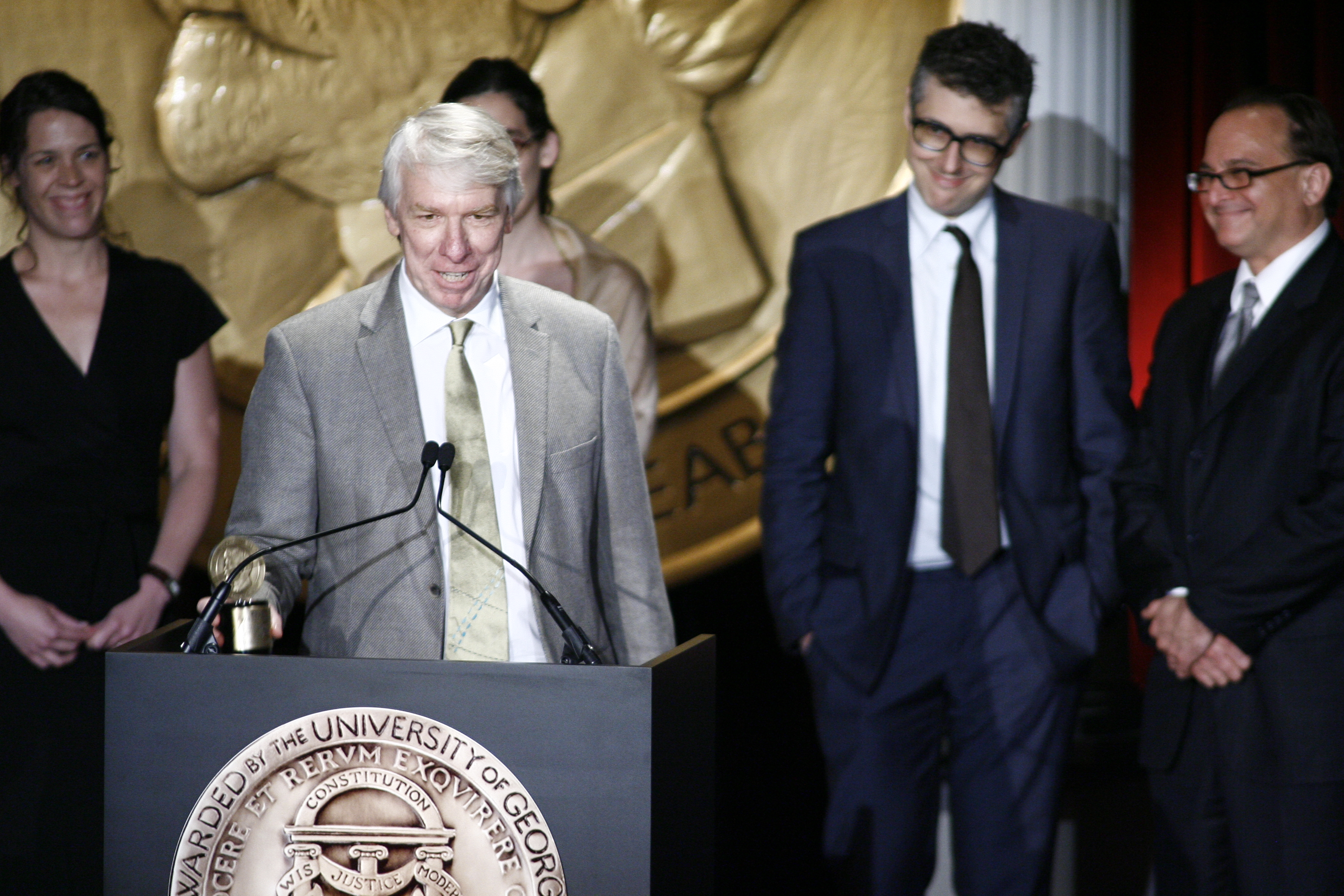
Julie Snyder, Jack Hitt, Ira Glass and Torey Malatia accept the Peabody Award, June 2007

Hitt's New York Times Magazine piece about a dying language called "Say No More" was selected for inclusion in The Best American Travel Writing 2005. A piece originally published in Harper's titled "Mighty White of You: Racial Preferences Color America's Oldest Skulls and Bones" was selected for inclusion in Best American Science Writing 2006. Another piece from Harper's titled "Toxic Dreams: A California Town Finds Meaning in an Acid Pit", was included in Ira Glass's The New Kings of Nonfiction (2007).

Jack Hitt and Paul Tough won a Livingston award for an article published in Esquire they wrote about Hackers titled "Terminal Delinquents."

Since 1996, Hitt has also been a contributing editor to the radio series This American Life. Showrunner Ira Glass wrote an announcement for Hitt's show that included a listing of what he considered to be stand out episodes of This American Life that Hitt had contributed to. That list included: "Fiasco," a story about a production of Peter Pan gone wrong; "The Super," a story about a superintendent Hitt had in New York City who was a former member of a Brazilian death squad; "Dawn," a story about his Charleston neighbor Dawn Langley Simmons (an early recipient of sex reassignment surgery); "The Middle of Nowhere," a story about the small pacific island of Nauru; and "Habeas Schmabeas," a story that contained multiple interviews with prisoners who had served time at Guantanamo Bay.

This American Life won a Peabody Award in 2006 for "Habeas Schmabeas."

Between 2017 and 2018, Hitt co-hosted the Gimlet Media podcast Uncivil along with Chenjerai Kumanyika. The episode of Uncivil titled "The Raid" won a Peabody award in 2017.

Hitt was a regular US correspondent on Nine to Noon, hosted by Kathryn Ryan on Radio New Zealand National.

In 2012, Hitt was interviewed on The Colbert Report about his novel Bunch of Amateurs: A Search for the American Character.

Between 2012 and 2013, Hitt performed a one-man show he wrote about his childhood and the outlandish characters he's met in his life called Making Up The Truth.

=== Film ===
Jack Hitt and Paul Tough are both listed as consultants for the movie Hackers (1995).

Parts of Hitt's account of his walk on the Camino de Santiago, Off the Road: A Modern-Day Walk Down the Pilgrim’s Route into Spain were reworked by Emilio Estevez and Martin Sheen into the movie The Way.

Hit was interviewed for two documentaries; Split: A Divided America (2008) and for Tower to the People (2015).

== Books ==
Written by Jack Hitt

- In a Word: A Dictionary of Words That Don't Exist, But Ought To (1992) ISBN 0-440-50358-2
- Off the Road: A Modern-Day Walk Down the Pilgrim’s Route into Spain (1994) ISBN 9780743261111
- Bunch of Amateurs: A Search for the American Character (2012) ISBN 0-307-39375-5

== Theatre ==
Jack Hitt wrote and performed Making Up the Truth, a one-man show that blends autobiographical storytelling with cognitive science to explore the nature of truth and memory. The piece, which premiered in 2012 at the Spoleto Festival USA, was directed by Jessica Bauman and produced by Aaron Louis. Making Up the Truth weaves together personal anecdotes with insights from neuroscience, examining how the brain constructs reality. Hitt performed the show at various venues, including the International Festival of Arts and Ideas, Joe’s Pub, and the Long Wharf Theatre, receiving praise for his engaging, humorous, and thought-provoking storytelling.

Edited by Jack Hitt

- Perfect Murder: Five Great Mystery Writers Create the Perfect Crime (1991) ISBN 978-0060163402
- What Are We Talking About?: The Harper's Forum Book (1991) ISBN 978-0806512303

Article by Jack Hitt selected for inclusion

- "Say No More" included in The Best American Travel Writing 2005, Jamaica Kincaid (editor) ISBN 9780618369515
- "Mighty White of You: Racial Preferences Color America's Oldest Skulls and Bones" included in Best American Science Writing 2006, Atul Gawande (editor) ISBN 978-0060726447
- "Toxic Dreams: A California Town Finds Meaning in an Acid Pit" included in The New Kings of Nonfiction (2007), Ira Glass (editor) ISBN 978-1594482670
