= Susan Burton =

American activist

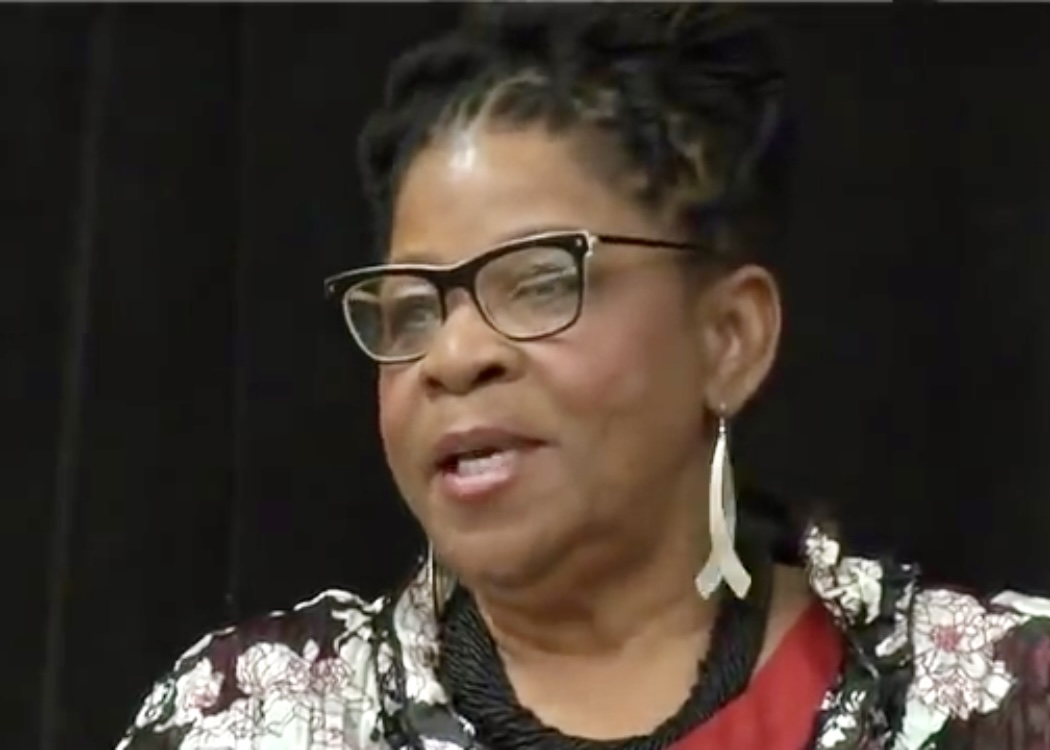
- Born: East Los Angeles
- Occupation: activist
- Known for: activism

Susan Burton is an American activist, author and founder based in Los Angeles, United States. In 1998, she founded of A New Way of Life Re-Entry Project, a nonprofit organization that supports formerly incarcerated people transition back to society. She was named a CNN Hero in 2010 and a Purpose Prize winner in 2012. Burton's advocacy work focuses on Criminal Justice Reform.

== Early life ==
Burton was born and raised in housing projects in East Los Angeles. Her upbringing was full of turmoil, and she struggled constantly. In 1982, her five-year-old son, Marque Hamilton, was accidentally hit and killed by a police cruiser. The loss lead to Burton's substance abuse. She became addicted to crack cocaine while living in Watts, Los Angeles.

== Incarceration ==
She eventually was arrested and jailed for crack cocaine. She went in and out of prison six times during the 1980s and the 1990s, each time she was released with limited money, no ID, and no social security card. She was trapped in a vicious cycle, where she could not find a job, did not have housing, and would eventually get caught and placed back in prison again. Upon her last release, a prison guard told her that he would see her in prison again soon. Determined to prove him wrong, Burton tried to find a drug treatment facility that was away from her home neighborhood, where it would be too easy to fall back into her old patterns of addiction. It was hard to find a rehabilitation center that she could afford, and finally she found the CLARE Foundation in Santa Monica. She stopped doing drugs in 1997, because of the help she received from the CLARE Foundation. While receiving treatment, it dawned on Burton that there were not facilities like this where she lived, and she began helping other women in similar situations.

== Activism ==
Burton founded the organization A New Way of Life, where she works with formerly incarcerated people fighting problems of re-entry. After her recovery at the CLARE foundation, Burton looked for other opportunities to continue her life outside of prison. She found that resources like food stamps and housing assistance were not given to her because of her record, and it was hard to find support that was affordable. Because of this, Burton was at a loss for ways to continue her life successfully after prison – an issue that far too many individuals face daily. This inspired Burton, and in 1998, Burton bought a house and converted it into a house for recently released female offenders. She started the program by going to the bus station where parolees were released, and inviting women she knew from the system to stay with her. She originally had 10 women living in the house, but after a year she began to lose money – and did not have enough to support everyone. A friend helped her apply for a grant to form this system into a real non-profit organization, and in 2000 A New Way of Life was officially born. Burton worked with organizer Melissa Burch, a member of the Los Angeles Chapter of Critical Resistance to start the LEAD project, which stands for Leadership, Education, Action and Dialogue. The LEAD project offered regular workshops that provided a space for residents of A New Way of Life to dialogue and understand the history of the prison industrial complex and prison abolition. Eventually, Burton became a certified chemical dependency counselor, and she now has five transitional houses in Los Angeles. The program helps women transition back into society, find work, and recover from drug addiction, 75 percent of the women in her program stay drug-free and do not return to prison for 18 months minimum. The organization now runs a free legal clinic, and each woman receives her own caseworker. She has helped more than 1,000 women, and all can stay until they are ready to move on to somewhere else. Further, the organization's legal department has provided pro bono services to over 2,000 formerly incarcerated and incarcerated people. Recently, the organization expanded and now provides $2 million in donated goods each year, which has helped more than 3,000 formerly homeless people get the necessary items to gain a home and live a healthy life. In January 2019, she made a trip to Uganda to not only visit prisons, but also to visit schools that house children of incarcerated mothers.

== Recognition and appearances ==
Susan Burton has received numerous awards and been appointed to several positions in her life time. Some of those accolades include:

- 2007, Burton was appointed to the Little Hoover Sentencing Reform Commission and the Gender Responsive Strategies Commission by then-governor Arnold Schwarzenegger.
- 2010, Burton was awarded the Citizen Activist Award from the Harvard University Kennedy School of Government.
- 2010, CNN named Burton a CNN Hero.
- 2012, she was named a Purpose Prize winner.
- In the California Wellness Foundation, she has been a Community Fellow.
- Through The Women's Foundation of California, Burton was a Women's Policy Institute Fellow as well as a Soros Justice Fellow through the Open Society Foundations.
- She is a board member on the Los Angeles Sober Living Network.
- 2014, Burton received the James Irvine Foundation Leadership Award.
- 2015, she was named one of the United States's 18 New Civil Rights Leaders by the Los Angeles Times.
- 2018 she was chosen by the National Women's History Project as one of its honorees for Women's History Month in the United States.
- 2019 she was awarded a Doctor of Humane Letters honorary degree from California State University, Northridge.

== Author ==
In 2017, Burton published an autobiography which became a bestseller. The book details her life journey and the founding of her organization, A New Way of Life. She distributed 8,000 copies of her book to incarcerated women and visited 64 prisons within a year.

- (2017) – Becoming Ms. Burton: From Prison to Recovery to Leading the Fight for Incarcerated Women by Susan Burton, Cari Lynn, and Michelle Alexander

== Personal life ==
The death of Burton's son and her subsequent incarceration impacted her relationship with her daughter Antoinette (Toni), who was 15 at the time of her brother's death. Burton has a granddaughter Ellesse.

In August 2019, California Governor Gavin Newsom granted a pardon to Burton.
