= Nancy Updike =

American radio producer and writer

- Occupations: Producer, Journalist
- Spouse: Dan Ephron

Nancy Updike is an American public radio producer and writer. Her work has been featured on radio programs including This American Life and All Things Considered, and has been published in The New York Times Magazine, LA Weekly, The Boston Globe, and Salon.com. She graduated from Amherst College in 1991.

== Personal life ==
Updike is married to Dan Ephron, an editor at Foreign Policy. They had their first date on July 1, 2003 at Focaccia Bar, an Italian restaurant in Jerusalem.

== Career ==
=== This American Life ===
Updike won a Peabody Award in 1996 for her work as a producer on This American Life. She won the Edward R. Murrow Award for news documentary (2005), and the Scripps-Howard National Journalism Award for the episode of This American Life about private contractors in Iraq titled "I'm From the Private Sector and I'm Here to Help."

=== Serial ===
Updike is a producer and co-creator of the true crime podcast Serial. Early in production, the creative team found the story falling flat and Updike is credited with asking, "Where's the hunt?," which transformed Sarah Koenig, the show's narrator, into the show's protagonist.
