= Hannah Dreier =

American journalist

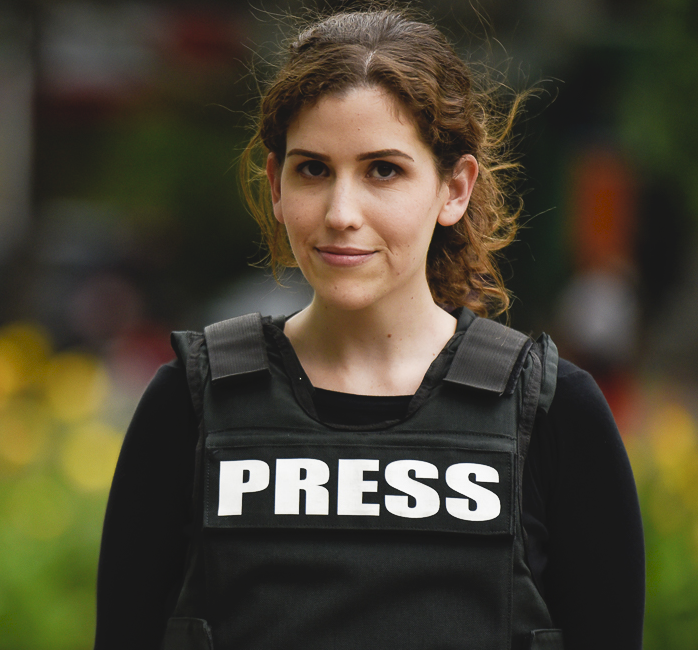
- Dreier in Caracas in 2018
- Education: Wesleyan University
- Occupation: Journalist
- Employer: The New York Times
- Awards: Gerald Loeb Award (2017, 2024); Pulitzer Prize (2019, 2022, 2024); National Magazine Award (2019, 2024); Livingston Award (2021); Goldsmith Prize for Investigative Reporting (2022, 2024, 2026); Worth Bingham Prize (2023, 2025)
- Website: hannahdreier.com

Hannah Dreier is an American journalist and staff writer for The New York Times. Previously, she was Venezuela correspondent for The Associated Press during the first four years of Nicolás Maduro's presidency. In 2016, she was kidnapped by the Venezuelan secret police and threatened because of her work. She has also written for ProPublica and The Washington Post.

She is the first person to win both the Pulitzer Prize for Investigative Reporting and the Pulitzer Prize for Feature Writing.

== Education and career ==
Dreier grew up in San Francisco and graduated from Wesleyan University. Her work has been collected in several anthologies, including The Best American Newspaper Narratives and, in 2019, The Best American Magazine Writing.

=== The Associated Press ===
Dreier joined The Associated Press as a politics reporter in Sacramento and later covered the business of gambling from Las Vegas. She was the AP's Venezuela correspondent for five years, moving to Caracas in 2013 amid a nationwide protest movement. She told the story of the country's unraveling from inside prisons, hospitals and factories. Her “Venezuela Undone” series illustrated the country's social and economic collapse through accounts of ordinary citizens struggling to survive.

Following the narcosobrinos affair, which saw president Nicolás Maduro's nephews arrested in the United States for drug trafficking, Dreier was detained by SEBIN secret police agents in Barinas, Venezuela. The agents threatened her during a recorded interrogation, saying they would behead her like ISIL did to James Foley. They also said that they would let her go for a kiss. Finally, agents said that they wanted to force the United States to exchange Maduro's nephews for Dreier, accusing her of being a spy and sabotaging the Venezuelan economy.

A piece in the Columbia Journalism Review highlighted Dreier's work translating the Venezuela crisis for foreign readers. "Dreier has helped the rest of us understand how, why and what, exactly, is taking place in the country. She’s also gained a huge following on social media, where readers catch a glimpse into everyday life there—the quirky, surprising and alarming—sometimes from the window of her apartment," it said.

=== ProPublica ===
In 2017, Dreier joined ProPublica as a reporter covering immigration. There, she wrote a series of investigative magazine features about the gang MS-13. One story showed that the FBI was using teenagers as gang informants, then turning them over to be locked up with the same gang leaders they had informed on. She spent more than a year embedded on Long Island with members of the MS-13 gang. She told the Longform Podcast, “You can’t come up with a good story idea in the office. I’ve never had a good idea that I just came up with out of thin air. It always comes from being on the ground.”

=== The Washington Post ===
Dreier worked for three years at The Washington Post. She reported on topics including policing, mental illness and federal disaster aid. In response to her reporting on inequities in disaster aid programs, FEMA reversed a policy that had shut out tens of thousands of Black disaster survivors living on heirs property. She spent weeks in a California FEMA trailer camp for a story. Esquire said, “Read the whole thing. Read it before you start reading about what’s going on in the Congress, because all you need to know about that can be found in an empty trailer park at the edge of the world.”

=== The New York Times ===
Dreier became a staff writer at The New York Times in 2022. She reported on a shadow work force of migrant children working dangerous jobs across the United States. During her research for the project, she interviewed more than 500 working migrant children. The series was called “the most recognized piece of global journalism” of 2024.

In 2024, Dreier served as commencement speaker for the Columbia University Graduate School of Journalism.

== Awards ==
Dreier's reporting has received many honors and awards, including recognition from the National Magazine Awards, the Peabody Awards, the Overseas Press Club, the James Beard Awards, the Robert F. Kennedy Journalism Awards, and the Gerald Loeb Awards.

In 2017, she received the James Foley Medill Medal for Courage in Journalism for bravery in covering the violent turmoil in Venezuela. She won the Livingston Award, which honors journalists under the age of 35, for reports revealing that the Trump administration was using information from confidential therapy sessions to deport asylum-seekers. She was also a finalist for the award in 2012, 2017 and 2019 and 2021.

She received the Morley Safer Award for Outstanding Reporting from the Briscoe Center for American History, in 2019, for her ProPublica series, "Trapped in Gangland".

Dreier won the Pulitzer Prize for Feature Writing in 2019. The Pulitzer Board cited her “powerful, intimate narratives that followed Salvadoran immigrants on New York’s Long Island.” She was a finalist for the Pulitzer Prize for Investigative Reporting in 2022 for “a gripping, deeply reported series that illuminated how FEMA fails American disaster survivors.” She won the Pulitzer Prize for Investigative Reporting in 2024 for “revealing the stunning reach of migrant child labor across the United States.”

She has won Harvard University's Goldsmith Prize for Investigative Reporting in 2022, 2024 and 2026; in 2022, Dreier shared the prize with Andrew Ba Tran, for their work on "FEMA’s Disasters”, which also won the 2022 Brechner Freedom of Information Award.

Dreier received the Worth Bingham Prize in 2023 and 2025.
