= Kate Samworth =

American writer (born 1967)

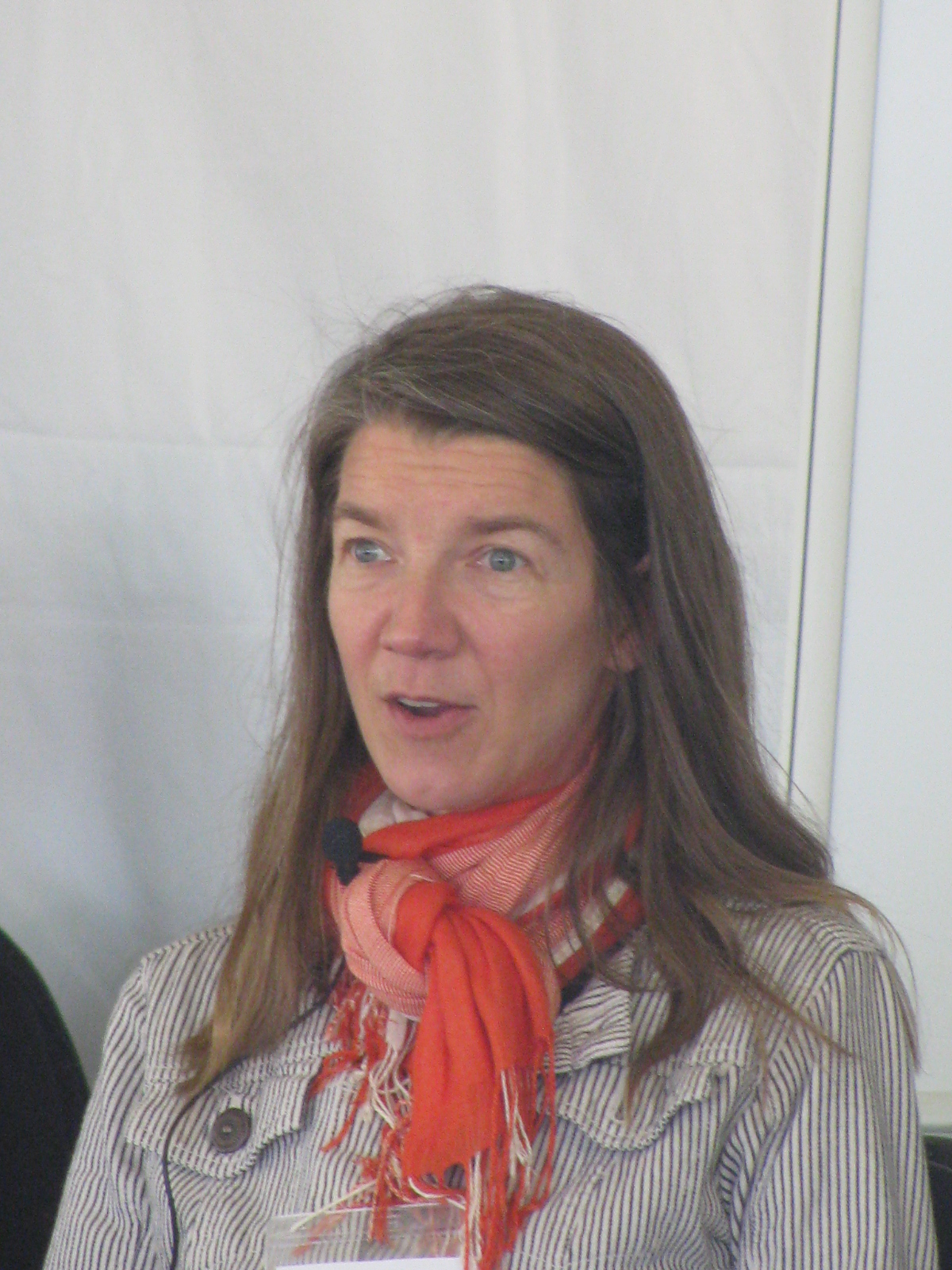
- Samworth at the 2014 Gaithersburg Book Festival
- Born: Chattanooga, Tennessee, USA
- Education: Bachelor of Fine Arts, Pennsylvania Academy of Fine Art, 2010
- Occupation(s): Artist, Author and Illustrator
- Known for: Aviary Wonders Inc.

Catherine Samworth (born 1967) is an artist, author and illustrator whose book Aviary Wonders Inc.: Spring Catalog and Instruction Manual won the Kirkus Prize for Young Readers in 2014 with the judges saying it was "one of the most creative books we have ever encountered." Her illustrations frequently involve the natural world and human interaction with it. Samworth's travels—to Europe, Mexico, Costa Rica, and Brazil—are a source for her artwork. Her book, Aviary Wonders, is a mockup of a catalog in a future world with extinct birds. Readers are invited to peruse "a charming selection of bodies and wings, and assemble a realistic bird automaton." Samworth says she is "trained in observational drawing and painting" and influenced by the darker aspects of Goya, Daumier, and Balthus."

She has illustrated four books, including Aviary Wonders Inc. and Grand Isle (Samworth is the author of these two), Why Fish Don't Exist by NPR science journalist Lulu Miller, and Liza Jane and the Dragon by Laura Lippman.

Samworth studied and taught painting at the New Orleans Academy of Fine Art, and considers Auseklis Ozols one of her mentors. She received a BFA from Pennsylvania Academy of the Fine Arts in 2010 where she studied printmaking and now teaches illustration and painting. Her paintings and prints are in the collections of the Kyoto Municipal Museum of Art, the Woodmere Art Museum, and the Fundación Lolita Rubial in Uruguay.

== Personal life ==
Samworth was born in Chattanooga, Tennessee and raised in the suburbs of Washington, D.C. She played bass in the band Fire Party in the late 1980s.
