= James Michalopoulos =

American painter

- Born: James Mitchell; 1951; Pittsburgh, Pennsylvania, United States
- Education: Self-taught; New Orleans Academy of Fine Arts; University of New Orleans
- Known for: Painting; Sculpture
- Movement: Post-Impressionist

James Michalopoulos (born 1951) is an American painter and sculptor. He is best known for his colorful interpretations of New Orleans. He has painted the landscape surrounding his home in Burgundy, France; cityscapes and street life in San Francisco and Boston; and anthropomorphically rendered animals.

== Personal life and education ==
James Michalopoulos, born James Mitchell, was born in Pittsburgh, Pennsylvania in 1951. His father Demetrius Anastasiou Michalopoulos, a Greek immigrant, was an architect who helped shape the Pittsburgh downtown. He is also the nephew of Abstract Expressionism painter William Baziotes, whose works filled his home. He attended and graduated from Bowdoin College. After graduating, he moved to New Orleans, Louisiana. He lives and works primarily in New Orleans. He also has a home in Burgundy, France.

== Work as a professional artist ==
Michalopoulos took art classes at the New Orleans Academy of Fine Arts and the University of New Orleans. He worked in Jackson Square as a street artist, drawing sketches of people in the square and drawing portraits of people for $2–3 each. Becoming tired of drawing portraits, he started traveling around the city with a portable easel, painting the buildings and architecture of New Orleans. He began selling his work in the French Quarter.

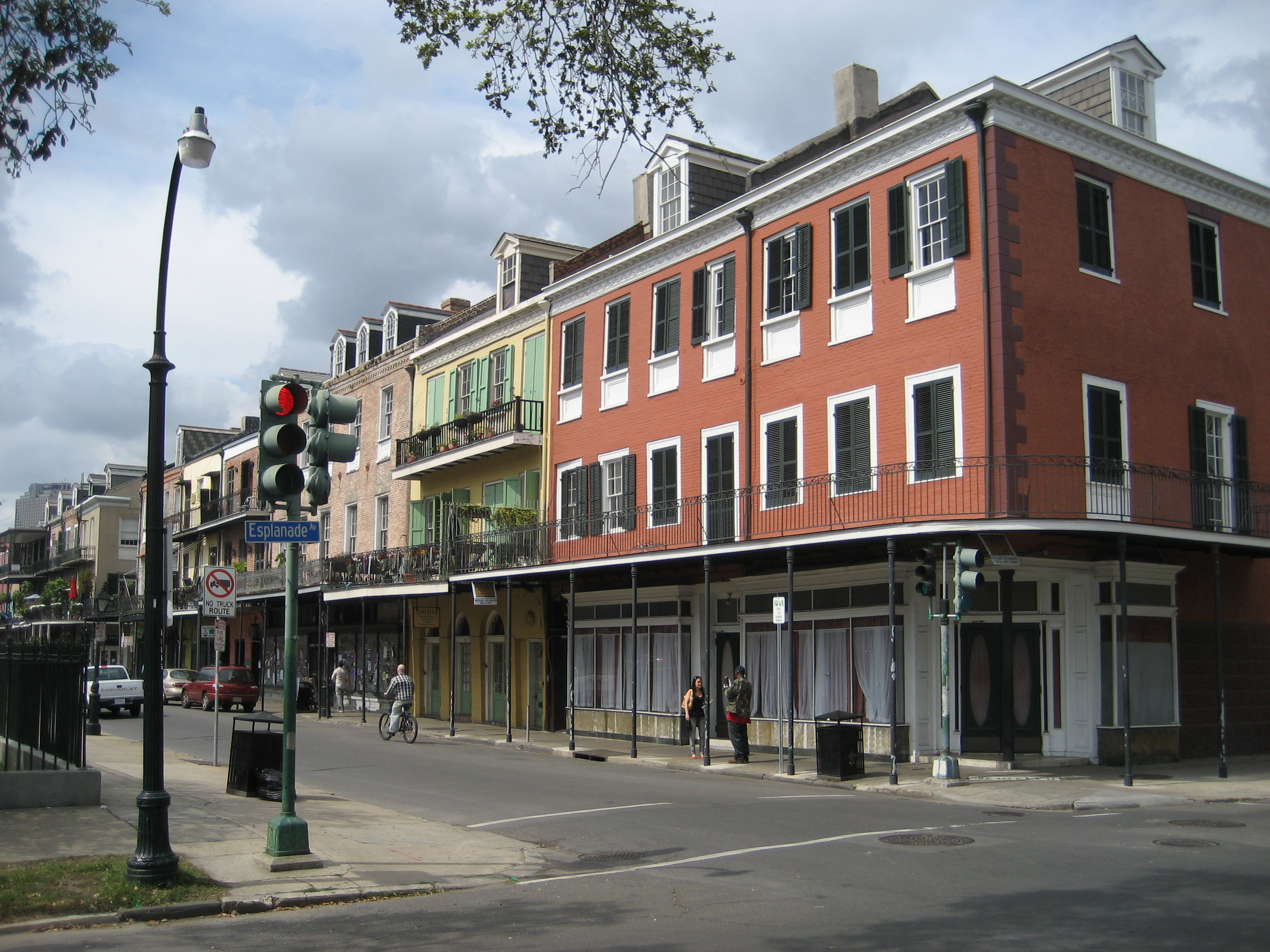
The architecture of New Orleans serves as an inspiration in James Michalopoulos' work

He has served as the official artist of the New Orleans Jazz & Heritage Festival six times, the most of any artist. Michalopoulos' collectible festival posters have featured Dr. John, Louis Armstrong, Mahalia Jackson, Fats Domino, Allen Toussaint, and Aaron Neville.

Mchalopoulos started working in sculpture in the 2000s, working first in wood and later in steel. His abstract work, Mother Cluster, from 2012, is exhibited on Veterans Memorial Boulevard, in Metairie, Louisiana. Mother Cluster consists of three pieces of different sizes, up to 40 feet tall, and was funded by art collectors Henry and Pat Shane. The sculpture's estimated worth is $425,000.

Michalopoulos' work is in the collections of the New Orleans Museum of Art and the Ogden Museum of Southern Art.

=== Process ===
It has been said that "there is perhaps no living artist more deeply tied in the mind of the public to the visual landscape of New Orleans than Michalopoulos." His oil paintings are colorful and feature "exaggerated viewpoints and skewed perspectives." He uses palette knives in his work, which helps provide intense color and texture. The subjects of his sculptures range from fish and fire hydrants to immense gestural studies of color and form in metal. Michalopoulos can complete an oil painting within two to three days. He leaves "completed" paintings in his studio for weeks and continues to add to paintings as he feels is necessary. Works are then sent to art galleries. At gallery openings, he has brought his palette to touch up paintings on the spot. When painting singer Aaron Neville, he used photographs of the singer to create the portrait painting titled Heart Song. The painting was inspired by Neville's cover of Leonard Cohen's "Bird on the Wire."
