= Marvel 1602 =

Limited series from Marvel Comics by Neil Gaiman

- Cover to 1602 #8, featuring from left to right: Matthew Murdoch, Virginia Dare, Rojhaz, Sir Nicholas Fury, and "John" Grey. The scene was based on a famous sketch of the men involved in the Gunpowder Plot of 1605 against King James.

Publication information
- Publisher: Marvel Comics
- Schedule: Monthly
- Format: Limited series
- Genre: Alternate history, superhero
- Publication date: November 2003 – June 2004
- No. of issues: 8

Creative team
- Written by: Neil Gaiman
- Artist(s): Andy Kubert; Scott McKowen (covers)
- Colorist: Richard Isanove

Collected editions
- 1602: ISBN 0-7851-4134-0
- 1602: New World: ISBN 0-7851-1494-7
- 1602: Fantastick Four: ISBN 0-7851-2293-1
- 1602: Spider-Man: ISBN 0-7851-2817-4
- 1602: Witch Hunter Angela: ISBN 0-7851-9860-1

Marvel 1602, or simply 1602, is an eight-issue comic book limited series published in 2003 by Marvel Comics. The limited series was written by Neil Gaiman, penciled by Andy Kubert, and digitally painted by Richard Isanove; Scott McKowen illustrated the distinctive scratchboard covers. The eight-part series takes place in a timeline where Marvel superheroes exist in the Elizabethan era; faced with the destruction of their world by a mysterious force, the heroes must fight to save their universe. Many of the early Marvel superheroes—Nick Fury, the X-Men, the Fantastic Four, and Spider-Man—as well as villains such as Doctor Doom and Magneto appear in various roles.

Neil Gaiman had always been a fan of Marvel, and editor Joe Quesada approached Gaiman to work on a project which eventually evolved into 1602. The success of the comic led to three sequels, entitled 1602: New World, Marvel 1602: Fantastick Four, and Spider-Man: 1602. There is also a short story, "Son of the Dragon", starring the 1602 version of the Hulk in the second issue of Hulk: Broken Worlds. In 1602: Witchhunter Angela of Marvel's 2015 Secret Wars event, Angela appears as a hunter of witchbreed (mutants).

The pocket reality seen at the end of the limited series in which the continuing Marvel 1602 universe takes place is classified as Earth-311. The series was loosely adapted into the Marvel Cinematic Universe (MCU) / Disney+ series What If...? episode "What If... the Avengers Assembled in 1602?" in 2023.

== Development ==
=== Background ===
Neil Gaiman stated in an afterword to the series that he had always viewed the Marvel universe as "magic". The editors of 1602, Nick Lowe and Joe Quesada, approached Gaiman after Quesada became Marvel's Editor in Chief with the intent for Gaiman to work on a project for Marvel. Gaiman eventually agreed to write a Marvel comic in August 2001, although he was not sure what it would contain. When the September 11, 2001 attacks occurred, Gaiman decided that he did not want planes, skyscrapers, bombs or guns in his comic. "I didn't want it to be a war story, and I didn't want to write a story in which might made right—or in which might made anything." On a trip to Venice soon after, Gaiman was struck by how the "past seemed very close at hand"; he returned from the trip knowing the story he wanted to tell. The time was chosen because "it was a nice place to set the story. It gave me America and it gave me a lot of things that I wanted in terms of the way the world was changing. It also gave me the sense of wonder and magic."

Gaiman described writing the series as odd, since he had not written comics in half a decade; the story was trimmed down significantly as the size went from six 36-page chapters to eight 22-page segments. He also wanted to write a comic that was different from The Sandman, his most recognized work. The profits of the series went to help fund his Marvels and Miracles LLC company, which was fighting for the rights to Marvelman.

=== Illustration ===
Kubert's pencils (top) contrasted with the finished panel

Unlike usual penciled pages, Marvel 1602 used a technique called "enhanced pencils", whereby the finished pencil drawings are sent straight to the colorist instead of to an inker first. This technique had been used before on Kubert's Origin, and results in cleaner and more elaborate lines.

Editor Nick Lowe noticed theater posters done by Scott McKowen and decided that the "engraving 'look' of the scratchboard would be interesting for the historical setting of this story." Scratchboard is a technique where a sharp knife is used to scrape through a layer of black ink to a hard chalk surface underneath; in effect, artists draw white lines on an all-black surface. All McKowen's illustrations were done by hand and then colored later in Photoshop. For inspiration, McKowen looked at 17th-century engravings. He also added scrolls or flags to the covers for the Marvel 1602 titles, basing the designs on Renaissance paintings where scrolls are used to comment on the scenes depicted.

The hardbound edition features a scratchboard illustration depicting the main characters whispering discreetly to each other on the cover. According to McKowen, the image was inspired by a depiction of the masterminds behind the "Gunpowder Plot", an attempt to blow up Parliament during the reign of King James. Since the characters of the story are all traitors in the eyes of King James, they were drawn in a similar fashion.

== Synopsis ==
=== Premise ===
In the year 1602 in the Marvel Universe, for an unknown reason, superheroes have appeared about 400 years early. They were born and bred in this era and some hold important positions in high places. When the characters come to realize that something is wrong with the universe, the heroes must solve the mystery behind their own existence, while dealing with intrigue at the courts of Elizabeth I and James.

=== Plot ===
All over Europe, strange weather provokes panic, with many believing that the unnatural occurrences are the beginning of the Apocalypse. Dr. Stephen Strange, the court physician of Elizabeth I, senses that there are unnatural forces at work. He has also been asked to watch over the secret treasure of the Knights Templar which is being brought to England from Jerusalem. Elizabeth tasks her head of intelligence, Sir Nicholas Fury, to bring the treasure—believed to be a weapon—to England safely. Fury in turn contracts blind minstrel and agent Matthew Murdoch to rendezvous with the Templar guard somewhere in Europe and secure the weapon. Later that evening, Fury and his assistant Peter Parquagh are attacked by an assassin whom Fury disables and locks in the Tower of London.

Meanwhile, the ship Virginia Maid arrives in England from the New World, carrying the young Virginia Dare, the first child born in Roanoke Colony, as well as her Native American bodyguard Rojhaz. They are taken to meet the Queen only for a second winged assassin to snatch Virginia. Rohjaz quickly disables the attacker, but not before Virginia transforms into a white gryphon. Rojhaz subdues Virginia, and Strange bespells her to human form before Fury sees her. Dare's powers cause Strange to suspect that she is the cause of the disastrous weather. Fury interrogates the imprisoned assassin to learn who sent him. He is told that it is Count Otto von Doom, ruler of Latveria, but Fury is too late to stop one of Doom's machines from killing Elizabeth with a poison gas released by dropping a pill into aqua regia.

Upon Elizabeth's death, James VI becomes ruler of both England and Scotland. James is distrustful of "witchbreed", those with magical or uncanny powers, and collaborates with Spanish High Inquisitor Enrique to blame the witchbreed of England, headed by Carlos Javier, for Elizabeth's death. Fury, a friend of Javier and his students, is forced to take the witchbreed to the Tower. Strange, Javier, and Fury meet and discuss how to save the world; an act which will almost surely lead to them being branded traitors by James. Strange learns that Natasha, a fellow agent, has betrayed Murdoch and the Templar agent Donal to Doom. Strange also learns that Doom has been holding captive four heroes from the ship Fantastick, including Fury's friend Sir Richard Reed. Javier agrees to help Fury, and the party sets out on a ship levitated by Javier and his page John Grey across the continent.

Strange meanwhile finds himself on the moon where he meets the Watcher Uatu, who tells him that the strange events are due to an anomaly he calls the Forerunner. The Forerunner is from the future and its presence in the past has disrupted reality to the point of impending annihilation of not only Strange's world but all other universes as well. Explaining his theory that the emergence of various superhumans on Stephen's Earth four hundred years before their season is the result of the universe trying to save itself, the Watcher tells Strange that he will not be able to repeat what he has learned while he lives.

Fury, Javier, and his students launch a successful attack on Doom's fortress; John Grey, revealed to be female, dies from her exertions in keeping the ship intact. The Four of the Fantastick are freed, and Doom is horribly scarred when lightning strikes a golden ball that he believes is the Templar's treasure. In fact, the true treasure is Donal's walking stick, which when struck on the ground transforms into the hammer Mjolnir and Donal into the Norse god Thor. The ship of fugitives heads for the New World. In Spain, Enrique is exposed as both a witchbreed and a Jew, and sentenced to be burned at the stake with his young acolytes, Petros and Sister Wanda. Using his powers, Enrique frees himself and his acolytes, and they escape on a ship of their own, also bound for America.

Strange is executed by James, who is furious that Fury and the witchbreed escaped him. Now no longer constrained by the Watcher's oath, Strange communicates telepathically with his wife Clea. He informs her that the Forerunner is the cause of the anomalies and that universal salvation depends on its transport back to its time; she takes his head from its pike at the Tower of London and sets off for America with Virginia and Rojhaz. Clea voices her opinion that Strange's suspicions were wrong, and that the Forerunner is not Virginia. Rojhaz confirms this, revealing himself to be Steve Rogers. After fighting against a 21st-century dictatorship led by a President for Life, Rogers was captured and sent back in time so as to completely erase his legacy. He was taken in by Native Americans who misheard his name; upon encountering the struggling Roanoke colony, he helped it survive and became Virginia's bodyguard.

Fury and company arrive at the Roanoke colony, where they discover the rift through which Rogers arrived. Javier senses three ships incoming: the Virginia Maid, Enrique's ship, and a ship carrying James's agents, among them his advisor David Banner and Parquagh, who has been coerced into loyalty. Realizing that the rift is radiating "galvanic" energy, Javier enlists Enrique to manipulate the rift in exchange for an unspecified boon. Donal summons Thor once more, enabling the necessary input of energy to open the rift again. On the beach, Fury kills all of James's agents except for Parquagh and Banner. In England, Murdoch threatens James with death should he harm Fury. Rogers refuses to go back through the rift, hoping to build a better America. Fury incapacitates him and carries the body back through the rift, thus going into the future himself.

The rift and the universe restore themselves, meaning the destruction of the alternate timeline; however, Uatu the Watcher is granted a "pocket universe" by his colleagues in which the 1602 timeline remains intact, and where the powered fugitives decide to settle in the Roanoke colony, declaring it a free place for all. Meanwhile, while walking in the woods with Virginia, Peter is bitten by a spider exposed to the energies released when Rojhaz and Fury entered the rift. Banner, who shielded Peter from the energies, has changed into a hulking gray monster. Intrigued by the continuing events, Uatu continues to watch the new universe (later designated Earth-311).

== Characters ==
1602 features both historical figures and many of the original Marvel superheroes and villains. Some popular characters, such as Wolverine, were not added because of Gaiman's vision to address the heroes of the 1960s. "The territory doesn't go much further than 1969 in terms of the characters that I picked to use," Gaiman noted. "I couldn't get everybody in because there are an awful lot of Marvel characters."

- Elizabeth I of England: The aging Queen of England. Already close to death, she is killed by a poisonous gas device constructed by Otto von Doom (the Doctor Doom of this reality).
- James I of England: Originally King James VI of Scotland, James becomes the monarch over England as well with Elizabeth's death. James maintains an intense hatred of witchbreed (the mutants of this reality) and seeks to destroy them along with any who practice sorcery or witchcraft.
- Virginia Dare: The daughter of Ananias Dare, and the first English child born in the Americas. In this world, the Roanoke Colony did not disappear in the 1580s; when Steve Rogers went into this world he saved the colony, which would have been killed by starvation. Dare touches the rift caused by Rogers' arrival. She has the ability to transform into white-furred animals when frightened, which she later learns to control, and appears to be the equivalent to Alpha Flight's Snowbird who has a similar appearance and powers, though Neil Gaiman had denied this.
- Uatu, the Watcher: A younger member of a race of intelligent beings who have sworn not to interfere in the affairs of lesser races, only to watch and observe. He breaks this oath, however, by explaining the situation to an astral projection of Doctor Stephen Strange.
- Sir Nicholas Fury: The Queen's intelligence officer (referred to as the "intelligencer") and responsible for foiling many past plots against the monarch. Seemingly killed when he carries an unconscious Rojhaz into the dimensional rift.
- Doctor Stephen Strange: The Queen's Physician, who is also a magician and alchemist. He allows himself to be beheaded by King James, which subsequently frees him from the restriction placed upon him by Uatu the Watcher (namely, that he could not reveal what he knows while still living).
- Peter Parquagh: Sir Nicholas' apprentice; left orphaned and tended to by his aunt and uncle until Fury arrived and took the boy to London.
- Matthew Murdoch: A blind Irish minstrel who moonlights as a freelance agent. Matthew was blinded by a mysterious substance he encountered as a child; yet from it, he also acquired heightened senses.
- Clea Strange: Stephen Strange's wife and assistant, Clea actually comes from another dimension. After bringing her husband's severed head to the Roanoke colony—thus fulfilling her last promise to him—she asks the heroes to bury the head with the rest of the body and then returns to her home dimension.
- Rojhaz: Virginia's blonde-haired, blue-eyed Native American bodyguard, who in fact is a displaced Captain America from a dystopian future. When the government of his time ruled by Purple Man captured him and attempted to execute him using advanced technology, he was accidentally sent back in time—the event which triggered the alternate timeline to begin with—thus forming the paradox of the story.
- Carlos Javier: A Spaniard living in England, where he runs a "College for the Sons of Gentlefolk", in fact a haven for "witchbreed". His students include Roberto Trefusis, Scotius Summerisle, Hal McCoy, Werner, and "John" Grey (who is in fact a young woman with psychic powers rivaling his own).
- The Four from the Fantastick: A band of explorers who gained powers when their ship encountered a strange energy vortex at sea. The four are Captain Benjamin Grimm, Sir Richard Reed, Susan Storm, and John Storm. Their bodies were reshaped into the four elements: Reed's body became pliable like water, Grimm's body became solid rock, Susan's body became weightless and invisible like air, and John's body became living fire. They are eventually captured by Doom.
- Grand Inquisitor Enrique: Born a Sephardic Jew, a young Enrique was forcibly baptized and seduced by a Catholic priest, and thus inducted into the church. As an adult, he leads the Spanish Inquisition—a position of power through which he can further his own plans. Although ordered to execute the witchbreed, he hides those whom he can pass off as normal. Secretly a witchbreed himself, he uses his activities as a cover to form a "Brotherhood of Those Who Will Inherit the Earth". He is assisted by Sister Wanda and Petros, who are secretly his children. He is also aided by Toad, despite Toad's betrayal at one point.
- David Banner: An advisor to King James, Banner is sent to Roanoke in order to kill Fury. When the rift is closed at the end of the story, Banner is caught within the backlash and is later seen lurking in the nearby woods as a massive gray-skinned creature.
- Count Otto von Doom: Doom is the ruler of Latveria, known as Otto the Handsome due to his perfect physique and appearance. He captures the Fantastick Four in order to force Reed's compliance in creating war machines, poisons, and various other inventions. Von Doom is later struck and badly burned by Thor's lightning, although he survives.
- Donal: The Guardian of the Templar Treasure, who is captured by Count Otto von Doom on his way to deliver the treasure of the Templars (the hammer Mjolnir disguised as a simple walking stick) to England. He is rescued by Sir Nicholas Fury and the witchbreed and is taken to the New World along with the Fantastick Four.
- Natasha: She travels with Matthew while en route to meet Donal, who is bringing the Templar Treasure to England. Natasha is revealed to be working for Count Otto von Doom.

== Reception and legacy ==
The first issue of 1602 was ranked first in August 2003 US comics with pre-order sales of 150,569.

1602 received mixed praise upon its release with Comics Bulletin stating "Is 1602 good? Yes, it's damn good. Is it revolutionary or even ground breaking? No. Sorry, but I can't go so far as to call a glorified What If? series anything more than what it is; a well done re-imagination of the Marvel Universe." Entertainment Weekly declared that the combination of writing and moody artwork meant "the Marvel Universe hasn't been this engrossing in ages." ShakingThrough.net noted that fans looking for elements of Gaiman's The Sandman would be disappointed; "It's not a senses-shattering Marvel epic, but then it's not meant to be. It's nothing more or less than a chance to enjoy reinterpretations of some familiar characters." UGO Networks concurred, stating "there doesn't need to be a 'point' in re-imagining familiar icons—it's simply meant to be fun. [...] The result of 1602 is agreeable entertainment." The series won several awards, including the Quill Book Award for Graphic Novels. The first issue was also awarded the 2003 Diamond Distributors Gem Award as "Comic of the Year".

Conversely, Time Magazine listed it as the worst comic of 2003, although the list's composer later stated "he didn't actually mean it was the worst comic of the year." UGO's Darren Latta noted as a downside to the series that "the approach maybe a little too subdued at times." Latta also felt that despite being familiar with the setting, Gaiman never utilized the period to its full potential. Others simply felt that Gaiman's involvement led to inflated expectations; one review noted that while reading "I [...] felt at times like maybe it was all a little bit too cute, a little bit too in-jokey."

James Fleming, an adjunct instructor at Keiser University and Southern New Hampshire University, has also written about the use of the postmodern tradition in 1602 and how this is employed as a means to respond to the post-9/11 world in which the comic was written.

=== Sequels ===
1602's success led to three sequels.

- 1602: New World is a five-issue limited series written by Greg Pak and illustrated by Greg Tocchini. The series was published from August 2005 to January 2006. Taking place shortly after the end of 1602, the heroes are settling down in America. Lord Iron and Captain Ross had arrived to hunt down David Banner while coming into conflict with the Spider and Virginia Dare. Meanwhile, Master Osborn tries to turn the natives against the settlers.
- Marvel 1602: Fantastick Four, is a five-issue miniseries written by Peter David and pencilled by Pascal Alixe. The series was published from November 2006 to March 2007. The story involves the Fantastic Four's adventures in London, the return of Otto von Doom, and the "Four Who Are Frightful" when they capture William Shakespeare to chronicle Otto von Doom's travels to Bensaylum, ruled by Numenor. Other characters include Wyatt Wingfoot, Doris Evans, and Rita.
- Spider-Man: 1602 is a five-issue miniseries written by Jeff Parker and pencilled by Ramon Rosanas. The series was published from December 2009 to April 2010. The story centers on the continuing adventures of the Spider and features reinterpretations of Victor Octavius, the Lizard, and Mary Jane Watson. Also appearing are the Beast, Janette Pym and Henri Le Pym, the King's Pin, Bullseye, and Steve Rogers.

=== Spider-Verse ===
The Marvel 1602 universe appears in a lead-up to Spider-Verse. Peter Parquah is on stage at the Globe Theatre with Marion Jane Watson's family when Morlun appears. Peter attempts to defend himself, but Morlun proves too powerful. Morlun brings down the Globe Theater around everyone, and absorbs Peter's life essence. Before disappearing into another dimension, Morlun declares that all spiders will die.

=== Secret Wars (2015) ===
Marvel 1602 appears in Secret Wars where its domain on Battleworld is referred to as King James' England. It is mostly featured in the comic 1602: Witch Hunter Angela (which features a witch hunter version of Angela). The Secret Wars Marvel 1602 now includes Bronze Age and Modern Age Marvel characters where its King James is a variation of Wolverine.

=== Web-Warriors ===
The Web Warriors (Alternate versions of Spider-Man) visited the 1602 Universe to deal with the dimension's version of Sinister Six called the Sinister Sextet which consists of Carnage, Electro, Karnov, Magus, and Serpent. After apprehending the villains, they noticed the dimension's Electro has escaped. Unbeknownst to the heroes, Electro followed them back to the Great Web.

== In other media ==
=== Television ===
- The Marvel 1602 reality appears in The Super Hero Squad Show episode "1602! (Six Against Infinity, Part 6)".
- Marvel 1602 creator Neil Gaiman stated that he pitched the idea of a live-action adaptation of the series to Marvel Television, only to be rejected. Additionally, Marvel Studios producer Kevin Feige has also stated that he is interested in a Marvel 1602 series alongside Earth X, but noted that there must be a built-in audience for it.
- The Marvel 1602 reality appears in the second season of What If...? (2023). The universe primarily appears in the episode "What If... the Avengers Assembled in 1602?", which was produced without Neil Gaiman's involvement.

=== Video games ===
- Spider-Man 1602 appears as an unlockable skin in Spider-Man: Shattered Dimensions.
- Spider-Man 1602 appears as a playable character in Spider-Man Unlimited.

== Collected editions ==
Title	Material collected	Published date	ISBN
Marvel 1602	1602 #1–8	October 2004	0-7851-1073-9
Marvel 1602: New World	Marvel 1602: New World #1–5	January 2006	978-0785114949
Marvel 1602: Fantastick Four	Marvel 1602: Fantastick Four #1–5	June 2007	978-0785122937
Marvel 1602: New World/Fantastick Four	Marvel 1602: New World #1–5 and Marvel 1602: Fantastick Four #1–5	October 2009	978-0785141365
Marvel 1602: Spider-Man	Marvel 1602: Spider-Man #1–5	May 2010	978-0785146032
1602 Witch Hunter Angela	1602 Witch Hunter Angela #1–4 and 1602 #1	March 2016	978-0785198604

== See also ==
- Dark Knights of Steel – a comic book series by DC Comics with a similar premise
