= USDA Coalition of Minority Employees =

Civil rights organization

- Formation: May 5, 1994; 32 years ago
- Headquarters: Vancouver, Washington, United States
- President: Ron Cotton
- Founder: Lawrence Lucas
- Website: www.agcoalition.org

The USDA Coalition of Minority Employees is a civil rights organization formed by employees of the United States Department of Agriculture (USDA) in 1994 specifically focused on ending discrimination within the department and more generally on eradicating racism in agriculture in the United States.

== Overview ==
The organization has met with many senators across the United States to raise awareness of the land theft against African Americans and create new legislation to create racial equity within agriculture. The organization's consistent push towards monumental change led to President Joe Biden creating a fund in the American Rescue Plan Act of 2021 for socially disadvantaged farmers to receive 120% of the outstanding indebtedness incurred against governmental organizations. The organization was cited as a main reason the Harvard Food Law & Policy Clinic called for the USDA to reform its Civil Rights division in April 2021.

On March 22, 2021, the USDA Coalition of Minority Employees moderated a briefing alongside Elizabeth Warren, Cory Booker, and Raphael Warnock to discuss the aid socially disadvantaged farmers will be eligible for under the American Rescue Plan.

== History ==
In 1996, Lawrence Lucas held a Congressional News Conference to raise awareness on discrimination within the USDA.

In 2016, Vice President Lesa Donnelly testified to a United States House Committee on Oversight and Reform to address sexual assault issues within the United States Forest Service. On December 1, 2020, Donnelly testified at the House Oversight Committee hearing entitled "Examining Sexual Harassment and Gender Discrimination at the U.S. Department of Agriculture."

In 2018, the organization held Sonny Perdue accountable for sexual misconduct in the United States Forest Service, leading to the resignation of Tony Tooke.

== Political positions ==
The organization is a staunch critic of United States Secretary of Agriculture Tom Vilsack. Lawrence Lucas cites Secretary Vilsack as being a main reason African American farmers have not received their Social Security and disability benefits. Politico highlighted the organization as being on the opposing side of Vilsack's 2020 nomination by President Biden, parting ways from the mainstream opinion of the nomination. The organization has strong ties with Elizabeth Warren, yet criticized the senator for labeling heir property as a main reason African American farmers have lost their land.

The organization endorses the Justice for Black Farmers Act of 2020 crafted by Cory Booker, Kirsten Gillibrand, and Elizabeth Warren, even going so far to label it the Black Farmers Civil Rights Act of 2020. The USDA Coalition of Minority Employees believes the bill is meant to provide justice for over one million African Americans who have had their land stolen in the history of the United States.

== Activism ==
In 2016, Lawrence Lucas protested outside the United States Supreme Court Building to address issues surrounding Pigford v. Glickman and the plight of African American farmers becoming homeless and landless.
