= Saskia Ozols =

- Known for: Painting
- Father: Auseklis Ozols

Saskia Ozols is an American artist and art educator residing in New Orleans, Louisiana. She is the daughter of artist Auseklis Ozols. In addition to certificates from the New Orleans Academy of Fine Arts and the Pennsylvania Academy of Fine Arts, she holds a master of fine arts degree from the latter institution. She has added her husband's family name to her own, and is now known as Saskia Ozols Eubanks.

== Exhibitions ==
Saskia Ozols' work has been exhibited in a number of locations including: Women With Guns in 2006, Poesis expo at Sören Christensen and Artists' House in Philadelphia. She has also judged an exhibit at the Poydras Home Art Show in 2007.
