= Krewe of Barkus =

New Orleans Krewe organization

The Mystic Krewe of Barkus is a New Orleans Mardi Gras parade where participants are dogs costumed according to a central parade theme. The annual event is organized by the Krewe of Barkus, a nonprofit organization that promotes adoption and rescue of homeless animals in New Orleans. The Mystic Krewe of Barkus makes fun of the more traditional New Orleans Mardi Gras parades and is the only Mardi Gras "krewe" in New Orleans created for dogs.

== History ==
The Mystic Krewe of Barkus traces its history to a November 1992 meeting of the Margaret Orr fan club. Orr is a meteorologist for New Orleans television station WDSU and regularly participates in the event as a Mistress of Ceremonies. The parade evolved from a bar prank, as a member of the club hatched the idea for a canine-centered "krewe" and it took hold. The Krewe was granted official parading status by the city of New Orleans in 1994.

The Krewe is reigned over by a canine King and Queen. The King traditionally is a purebred, however, only dogs that once were homeless are eligible to be crowned Queen. Membership in the Krewe of Barkus has grown over the years and now is limited by the city to 1,500 dog participants each year. Registration fees for members are donated to several animal welfare groups, including local chapters of the Society for the Prevention of Cruelty to Animals. Throughout the years, the annual event has donated hundreds of thousands of dollars for dog-related nonprofits.

The theme of the first Krewe of Barkus Parade was "Welcome to the Flea Market." Other themes have included: "Jurassic Bark"; "2001: A Dog Odyssey"; "Tailtanic: Dogs and Children First"; "Joan of Bark" and "007: From Barkus with Love". Local New Orleanian Matt Rinard is the official artist for the Krewe of Barkus since 1998.
