= Partition (law) =

Legal act of dividing an estate

A partition is a term used in the law of real property to describe an act, by a court order or otherwise, to divide up a concurrent estate into separate portions representing the proportionate interests of the owners of property. It is sometimes described as a forced sale. Under the common law, any owner of property who owns an undivided concurrent interest in land can seek such a division. In some cases, the parties agree to a specific division of the land; if they are unable to do so, the court will determine an appropriate division. A sole owner, or several owners, of a piece of land may partition their land by entering a deed poll (sometimes referred to as "carving out").

== Why forced sales occur ==
Forced sales generally occur because the owners of property in shared ownership are unable to agree upon certain aspects of the ownership. The owners may disagree on how to use the property, the amount of money to invest into the property, on their right to occupy and use the whole of the property. If the parties cannot come to an agreement, the case moves to court through a petition to partition action.

Property may be owned by more than one person either as joint tenants, tenants in common, and in some states tenants by the entirety. The choice of which tenancy to enter into is made by the parties at the time of purchase. With each type of tenancy, each owner has the right to occupy the whole. That means that owners are not allowed to designate certain rooms as their own, but each element of the property is enjoyed fully by all parties.

== Types of partition ==
There are three kinds of partition which can be awarded by court: partition in kind, partition by allotment, and partition by sale.

1. A partition in kind is a division of the property itself among the co-owners.
2. In a partition by allotment (or by appraisal), which is not available in all jurisdictions, the court awards full ownership of the land to a single owner or subset of owners, and orders them to pay the person or persons divested of ownership for the interest awarded.
3. Partition by sale constitutes a forced sale of the land, followed by division of the profits thus realized among the tenants. Generally, the court is supposed to order a partition sale only if the land cannot be physically divided, although this determination often rests on whether the economic value of the divided pieces is less in the aggregate than the value of the parcel as a single piece.

A provision in a deed completely prohibiting partition will not be given effect, but courts will enforce a provision that temporarily restricts partition, as long as the restriction is reasonable.

== Partition procedure ==
A party seeking a partition must file a partition lawsuit. State codes generally favor physical division (partition in-kind) of the affected property(s) over sale (partition by sale as a unit), particularly if a tenant would be displaced from his or her primary residence by a sale. If in-kind partition is feasible, the property(s) will be divided proportionally. Where small differences in such division are unavoidable, cash compensation for the difference(s) will be awarded to maintain proportionality. If the property(s) cannot be divided and allocated to give each tenant a portion without spoiling the whole, the court will order a sale. A special master (referee) is commonly appointed by the court to execute the partition process. The referee is responsible only to the court, and the referee is limited only by the court's instructions, and applicable state codes. For an in-kind partition, the referee will cause deeds to the adjusted property(s) to be prepared. Where easements are required for access, the referee will employ professionals (engineers, surveyors and other experts) as required to describe the easement(s). The conveyance deeds for the adjusted property(s) and the easement deed(s) will be recorded simultaneously. Often, "referee's deeds" (deeds signed by the referee, in the owner's stead) may be employed. In some cases, courts and co-owners explore alternatives to partition, such as voluntary buyouts, negotiated settlements, or structured agreements. This allows the parties to resolve ownership disputes without forcing a sale or physical division of the property.

== Tenants in common partitions vs. tenants with rights of survivorship partitions ==
Tenants in common (TIC) deeds may or may not be taken in equal shares, but a joint tenants with rights of survivorship (JTWROS) deed must always be taken in equal shares unless specifically and clearly indicated otherwise in the deed language. Therefore, a partition action for those two types of deeds will vary.

When a JTWROS property is partitioned, the proceeds must be divided equally among tenants without regard to contribution to purchase price since a JTWROS deed is always taken in equal shares. So with a JTWROS, contributions to purchase price is not an issue during partition. Otherwise, the premise of a JTWROS deed would be invalid and its purpose would be defeated. On the other hand, when a TIC property is partitioned, courts may be at liberty to consider unequal contributions to purchase price and adjust the tenants' distributions accordingly.

In either partition situation, tenants may request credits for unequal contributions to expenses incurred after taking deed to the property. Such credits may cover utility and maintenance expenses, and are allocated according to shares. Credits for improvements to the property may be granted if the improvements actually increased the value of the property.

== Statutory variations ==
=== Ontario, Canada ===
The Ontario Partition Act, R.S.O. 1990, c. P.4, states:

"3. (1) Any person interested in land in Ontario, or the guardian of a minor entitled to the immediate possession of an estate therein, may bring an action or make an application for the partition of such land or for the sale thereof under the directions of the court if such sale is considered by the court to be more advantageous to the parties interested. R.S.O. 1990, c. P.4, s. 3 (1)."

=== United Kingdom ===
In the United Kingdom the partition process is governed by legislation including the Law of Property Act 1925 which replaced the Partition Acts of 1868 and 1876. The partition action process involves

- a co-owner filing a lawsuit requesting the property be divided or sold;
- the court notifying the other owners, who can contest the request or propose alternatives;
- the court, if necessary, appointing appraisers or referees to determine whether the property can be divided or must be sold;
- the judge rules on the method of partition (in-kind, by sale, or by appraisal) based on legal and financial considerations;
- if a sale is ordered, the property is sold and proceeds are distributed according to ownership shares.

=== United States ===
==== Uniform Partition of Heirs Property Act ====
While each state has its own legislation, the Uniform Partition of Heirs Property Act (UPHPA), completed by the Uniform Law Commission in 2010, contains legal protections for heirs' property owners designed to address partition sales. The Act is not imposed upon states, but they may choose to adopt it. The UPHPA restructures the way partition sales occur in states that adopt the act, and generally includes three major reforms to partition law:

1. If a co-owner brings a partition action in court, the court must provide an opportunity to the other co-owners to buy out the co-owner who brought the action. The value of the share of the co-owner who brought the partition action is determined by multiplying the fair market value of the property as determined by an appraiser by the person’s percentage of interest in the property.
2. If there is no buyout, then the law provides a preference for the court to order a partition in kind and divide the property, rather than order a sale. The law requires courts to take into account factors other than economic, such as the value of family heritage, historical value of the property, or the impact of the sale on those living on the property.
3. If a partition in kind is not ordered, the UPHPA requires the court to sell the property at a market sale, not at an auction sale, and specifies a process for the property to be appraised and sold for its fair market value.

As of July 2025, 26 states and the Virgin Islands had passed the UPHPA, including Alabama, Arkansas, California, Connecticut, Florida, Georgia, Hawaii, Illinois, Iowa, Maryland, Michigan, Mississippi, Missouri, Montana, Nevada, New Jersey, New Mexico, New York, South Carolina, Texas, Utah, and Virginia. On January 1, 2023, California became the first state to expand the appraisal buyout process under the Uniform Partition of Heirs Property Act to non-heirs' partition actions. The passage of the act in all 50 states could mitigate the impact of partition sales on heirs' property owners.

=== Florida ===
Florida provides for partition actions by statute, Chapter 64, which basically provides that any co-owner of real estate may seek partition. In Florida, there are basically no defenses to a partition action, other than if the parties have agreed not to partition the real estate.

=== Pennsylvania ===
Property divided under Rule 1560(a) shall be awarded to the parties according to their respective interests.

A master who is appointed by the court shall make such examinations and hold such hearings as may be necessary, giving reasonable notice thereof. The master may employ appraisers and, with the authorization of the court, such other experts as are necessary to enable the master to perform his or her duties.

The court shall permit the shares of any two or more co-tenants to remain undivided between them if they so elect by writing filed within such time as the court or master shall direct.

Parties defendant owning a majority in value of the property may object in writing to any sale, requesting that the property be awarded to them at its valuation fixed by the court and that their interests in the same remain undivided. Upon such request the entire property shall be awarded to the parties objecting to sale, as tenants in common, subject to payment to the parties desiring partition and sale of the amounts of their respective interests based upon the valuation. The amounts due the parties shall be charged as liens upon the property, to be paid in such manner and time as the court shall direct.

==== Pennsylvania Partition Example ====
In D’Arcy v. Buckley, 71 Bucks Co. L. Rep. 167 (1997), two people purchased property as joint tenants with right of survivorship. The plaintiff contributed five times more than the defendant toward the purchase price. In a partition action, the plaintiff sought credit for the full amount of his superior contributions. The Court held that, in the absence of fraud, the working of the deed operated to convey a one-half interest to each of the two joint tenants. The decision relies the authorities of Masgai v. Masgai, 460 Pa. 453, 333 A.2d 861 (1975), and DeLoatch v. Murphy, 369 Pa. Super. 255, 535 A.2d 146 (1987). The plaintiff argued, to no avail, that he did not intend to make a lifetime gift to defendant.

=== California ===
Partition in kind is favored, Cal. Civ. Proc. Code § 872.810, but partition by sale is allowed if a partition by sale maximizes the market value of the subject property(s).

In many cases, a two-step process may be required: (1) a trial, during which oral and documentary evidence is heard, and either affirms or denies the right of the moving party to effect a partition of the subject property(s), and, if affirmed, results in an interlocutory judgment (sometimes called a "first interlocutory judgment"), and (2) particularly in a contested partition, an evidentiary hearing (also a trial), usually after the property(s) have been appraised by experts, and during which trial additional oral and documentary evidence is heard, the property(s) are ordered divided and awarded proportionally where possible, including cash compensation where proportional division is impractical or impossible (sometimes called a "second interlocutory judgment"). The division usually requires the employment of experts such as engineers and surveyors, and the preparation of special reports (which include conveyance deeds and easement deeds). As a final act, the court, in a hearing (not a trial), will accept the special reports and order that these be executed by a title company, which will also effectuate "recordation" of the conveyance and easement deeds (any cash compensation due any of the parties will also be effectuated within the escrow).

Once the court has determined that real property is to be partitioned, the court is authorized to appoint a Partition Referee for the purpose of handling the actual partition of the property. The Court’s interlocutory judgment may order either division of the property or sale of the property (with later division of the sale proceeds). In either case, a Partition Referee is appointed to carry the interlocutory judgment into effect. The Partition Referee may be authorized to employ attorneys, surveyors, real estate broker, engineers, and the like. The sale by the Partition Referee can be made by either public auction or private sale, whichever is more beneficial to the parties. The most common method of sale of real property is by private sale with the assistance of a real estate broker for advertising the property. Sales by Partition Referees must be confirmed by the court before becoming final. At the confirmation hearing, the court may confirm the proposed sale, reject the proposed sale, or allow higher bids for the property through an over-bidding process. The Partition Referee is given authority to execute documents as required to conclude a sale that is confirmed by the Court.
