= Hanna Rosin =

Israeli-born American writer (born 1970)

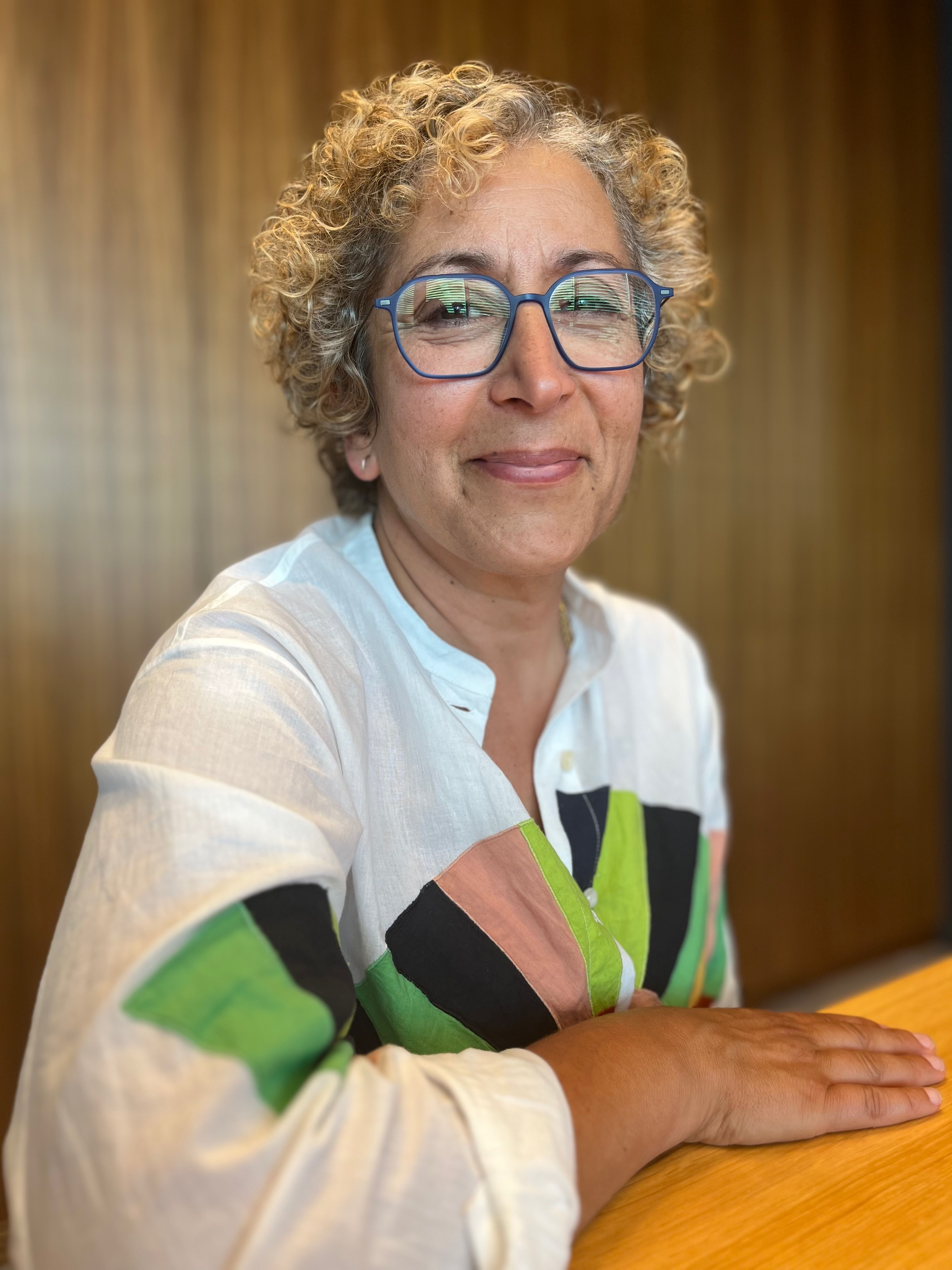
- Hanna Rosin at The Atlantic
- Born: 1970 (age 55–56); Israel

Hanna Rosin /ˈhɑːnə/ (born 1970) is an American writer and podcaster. She is the host of Radio Atlantic and a Senior Editor at The Atlantic. Previously she was the editorial director for audio for New York Magazine Formerly, she was the co-host of the NPR podcast Invisibilia with Alix Spiegel. She was co-founder of DoubleX, the now closed women's site connected to the online magazine Slate, and the DoubleX (now The Waves) podcast.

Rosin has written for The Atlantic, The Washington Post, The New Yorker, GQ, New York and The New Republic. She is the author of God's Harvard (2007) and The End of Men: And the Rise of Women (2012).

== Early life and education ==
Rosin was born in Israel and emigrated to the U.S. with her family in 1976, settling in the ethnically diverse neighborhood of Briarwood, Queens, where her father was a taxi driver. She is Jewish. She graduated from Stuyvesant High School in 1987, where she won a number of competitions on the debate team with her debate partner David Coleman. She attended Stanford University and was married to former Atlas Obscura CEO David Plotz.

== Career ==
Rosin is a co-founder of Slate magazine's DoubleX, a women's site. She is also a writer for The Atlantic. She has written for The Washington Post, The New Yorker, GQ and New York after beginning her career as a staff writer for The New Republic. Rosin has also appeared on The Daily Show and The Colbert Report on Comedy Central.

A character portrayed by actress Chloë Sevigny in the 2003 film Shattered Glass about Rosin's colleague at The New Republic, Stephen Glass, was loosely based on Rosin.

Rosin partly has specialized in writing about religious-political issues, in particular the influence of evangelical Christians on the 2004 U.S. presidential campaign. She is the author of God's Harvard: A Christian College on a Mission to Save America, published in September 2007. Based on a New Yorker story, the book follows several young Christians at Patrick Henry College, a new evangelical institution that teaches its students to "lead [the] nation and shape [the] culture."

In 2009, she published a controversial article in The Atlantic entitled "The Case Against Breast-Feeding," questioning whether current social pressures in favor of breastfeeding were appropriate, and whether the science in support of the practice was conclusive. In 2009 she was nominated for a National Magazine Award for "Boy's Life", a story about a young transgender girl. In 2010 she won the award for her contribution to a package of stories in New York magazine about circumcision. Her stories have also been included in anthologies of Best American Magazine Writing 2009 and Best American Crime Reporting 2009.

Rosin has published a book based on her 2010 Atlantic story, The End of Men. In it, she argued that the US is now in an era of female dominance. She said that the service economy is dominated by women. She also said she believes women will fill up leadership positions in many other industries, and that finance will be "the last one to go". She gave a TED talk on the subject in 2010. In the talk, she details the emergence of women as a powerful force in the American workplace. For Rosin, this shifting economy has allowed women to use their most gendered stereotypical strengths to succeed.

== Personal life ==
Rosin's partner is journalist and podcaster Lauren Ober.

== Bibliography ==
- God's Harvard : a Christian college on a mission to save America. Orlando, Fla.: Harcourt. 2007.
- "Did Christianity cause the crash?". The Atlantic. 304 (5): 38–48. December 2009.
- The End of Men: And the Rise of Women. New York, New York: Riverhead Books, 2012. ISBN 978-1-59448-804-7
- The Patriarchy Is Dead: Feminists, accept it. Slate.com (Sept. 11, 2013).
