= 81 Words =

2002 episode of This American Life

"81 Words" is an episode of the popular public radio program, This American Life, which is broadcast from Chicago Public Radio. This episode was originally aired January 18, 2002. The episode is narrated by Alix Spiegel, who was the recipient of the George Foster Peabody Award, the Livingston Award, and the Dupont Award. She won the 2002 Livingston Award in National Reporting for the 204th episode of This American Life, "81 Words". The program is hosted by Ira Glass, who gives the introduction for the episode stating,

"It's just uncanny, I think that's the word. It's just uncanny when something so small, for a moment, for the length of time it takes to sign [he is referring to a pen used to sign major U.S. legal documents] can carry the entire weight of history of a nation. Today's radio program is about something small like that, that was at the epicenter of massive social change in our country for a brief moment."

This narrative tale falls into the category of healing narrative. It is the healing narrative of Dr. John Patrick Spiegel, Alix Spiegel's grandfather. Dr. John P. Spiegel was a psychiatrist and the former president of the American Psychiatric Association.

== Summary ==
The episode is split into two acts. The first act explains that in 1973, the American Psychiatric Association (APA) declared that homosexuality was not a disease, by changing the 81-word definition of sexual deviance in its own reference manual. It was a change that attracted a lot of attention at the time, but the story of what led up to that change is one that was reported by Spiegel. Part one of Spiegel's story details the activities of a closeted group of gay psychiatrists within the APA who met in secret and called themselves the GAYPA ... and another, even more secret group of gay psychiatrists among the political echelons of the APA. Spiegel's own grandfather was among these psychiatrists, and the president-elect of the APA at the time of the change. Alix Spiegel states in the beginning of the story that, "...I know this story not because I read it in a book or learned it in any class, but because it's one of those stories that my family uses to explain itself." The story begins with a recording of John P. Spiegel interviewing himself in which he talks about how he has been asked to travel to Ireland to work with a gay activist who is trying to change the Irish constitution. Spiegel was asked to testify as an expert in mental health. Dr. Spiegel was asked to testify about the mental health of homosexuals. Oddly enough he was a homosexual who had not told anyone. He was asked to do this because he was the president elect of the American Psychiatric Association in 1973. It stated in the Diagnostic and Statistical Manual of Mental Disorders (DSM) that homosexuality was termed sexual deviance and that homosexuals were pathological. This gave the country the right to treat homosexuals differently. Alix Spiegel's family had always told the story of Dr. Spiegel as one that expressed him as the sole person to abolish the 81 word definition of homosexuality from the DSM, until a family vacation after Dr. Spiegel's wife had died, when he emerged from a beach bungalow with a much younger man who was later introduced to a shocked family as his lover.

The second act of the radio program explains the history of homosexuality in psychological terms and gives the conclusion to the story. At the same time that Dr. Spiegel is working in Ireland, a few gay activists began to make protests to try to get the designation of homosexuality changed. The story from this point gives a history of homosexuality, from its original state as a crime against the will of God, to it being a form of insanity, then stating it was just faulty wiring. The story continues by talking about Dr. Irving Bieber, who started doing a lot of tests with homosexuals. Dr. Bieber tried to find the cause for homosexuality in a psychological sense. The story continues to talk about the group of gay activists that worked inside of the APA, that had a large part to do with the changing of the 81 word definition. The GAYPA worked in the APA to get Dr. Robert Spitzer (the head of the APA) to rewrite the 81 word definition. The story ends with Dr. John P. Spiegel, president-elect of the APA, accepting the new definition of homosexuality.

== See also ==
- John E. Fryer
