= Matt Rinard =

American painter

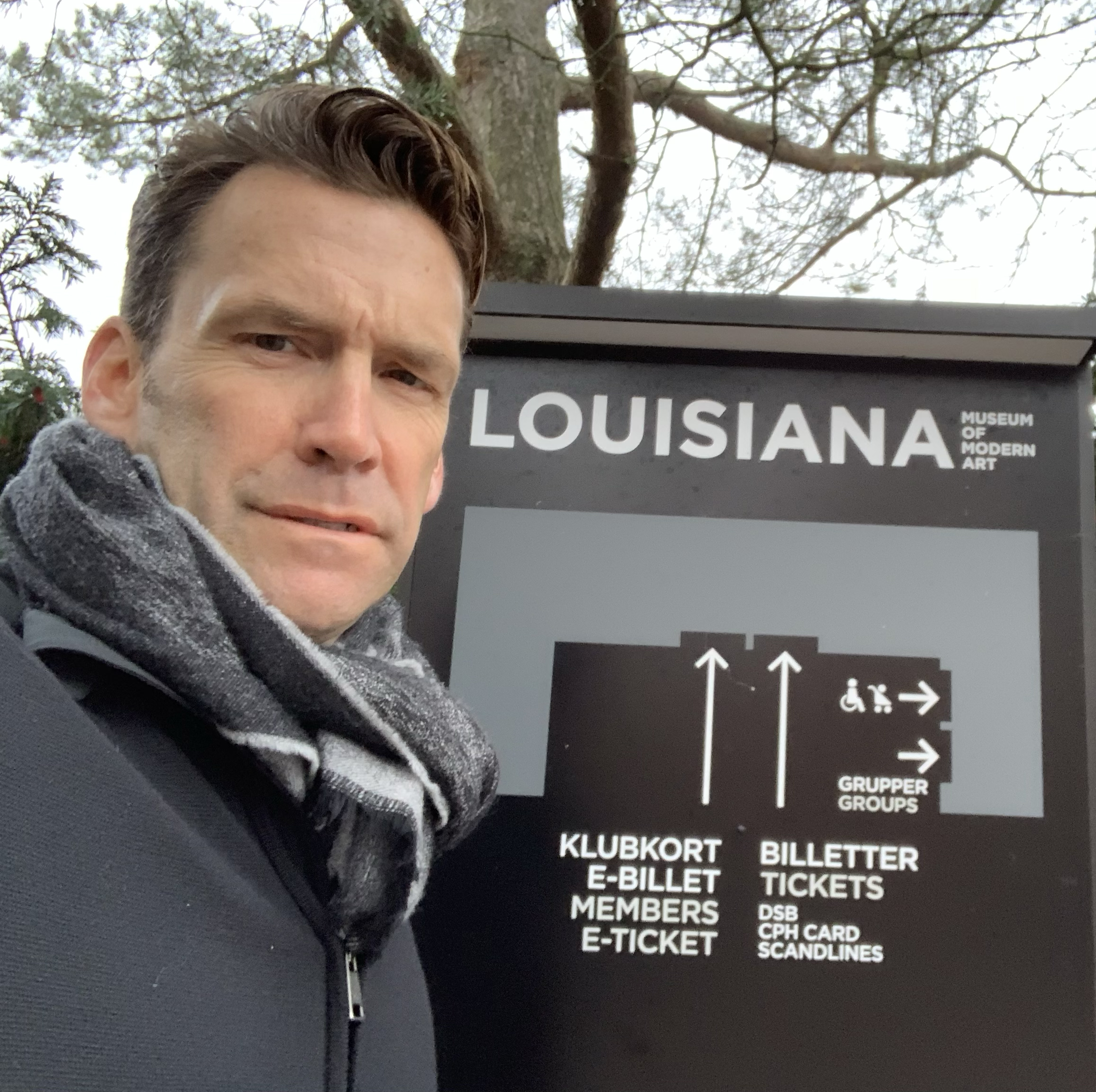
- Matt Rinard in 2018 at the Museum of Modern Art in Denmark
- Born: October 24, 1964 (age 61); Meridian, Mississippi
- Known for: Painting
- Style: Post pop art
- Website: www.galleryrinard.com

Matt Rinard is an American born artist living in New Orleans, Louisiana.

Born in Meridian, Mississippi on October 24, 1964, he is the son of an Admiral in the United States Navy. By the time he was 16 he had moved to six different states. He attended N.O.C.C.A. New Orleans Center for Creative Arts in 1980 and abandoned the school in 1981 to attend Holy Cross High School in the Lower Ninth Ward. He received a bachelor's degree from Florida State University in Graphic Design in 1987 and continued his artistic endeavors at the New Orleans Academy of Fine Arts from 1990 to 2003 under the tutelage of Auseklis Ozols.

In 1988 Matt started his own publishing company Spilled Inc. producing aquatint lithographs. His first publisher was Persian Boy Publishing producing limited edition hand pulled serigraphs. His publisher Roger Bogle was murdered in 1992. This unfortunate event forced Matt to produce and publish his own artwork out of his Spilled Inc. studio on Orleans Avenue in the French Quarter. In 1998 he opened his own gallery on Royal Street next to Rodrique's Blue Dog Gallery.

In 2001 he caught the eye of the legendary publisher Jack Solomon owner of S2art enterprises. S2art published the works of Erté, Tom Everhart, Ron Wood, Stanley Mouse, Gordon Parks, Rafał Olbiński and many other noteworthy 20th-century artists. S2Art produced hand pulled lithographs of Matt's creation on an 1810 Voirin French Press. These are the same lithographic presses that Toulouse-Lautrec used in the 1800s. He produced the first four lithographs in the S2 atelier in Soho, New York. The following lithographs were printed in their Las Vegas atelier under the master pressman Ray Mazza. Matt Rinard works primarily in gouache a highly pigmented and opaque watercolor. He depicts animals displaying very human characteristics and the work is best described as post pop art. His paintings and prints are also prized for their bold composition and vibrant colors, but it is his quirky sense of humor and his subject matter that have won him a devoted following among pet owners around the world.

In August 2005 Hurricane Katrina hit New Orleans and put 4 feet of water in Matt's studio/home in Lake Vista. This prompted him to move to Vail, Colorado until his home could be rebuilt. In July, 2006 he returned to New Orleans and reopened his gallery and studio. He received much support from his fan base in Germany and the United States. He works primarily in gouache which is an opaque watercolor. He currently resides in New Orleans in the house that was severely damaged by Hurricane Katrina.

In July 2013 Gallery Rinard was asked to vacate its gallery location after being there for 15 years due to the sale of the building. In 6 months time the gallery was relocated to 3 addresses on Royal Street. First location was 813 Royal Street where Matt Rinard shared space with his publisher. In November of the same year the gallery moved to 841 Royal Street which was an old grocery store in the 1940s. His current and final location starting April 1, 2014 is 611 Royal Street next door to The Court of Two Sisters. The ability to find a gallery on Royal Street is extremely difficult due to the finite store fronts and the intense competition for a lease.

In November 2018 Matt had a one-man show at the Georg Van Almsick Gallery in Gronau, Germany. "The occasion is the 300th anniversary for the city of New Orleans and the 30 year relationship between the jazz city of Gronau and the cradle of jazz on the Mississippi". This was his 6th one man show at this gallery: April 2002, April 2005, October 2005, April 2008, April 2010 and November 2018.

In 2019 Matt Rinard was again selected to create the official poster for the Crescent City Classic in New Orleans. This is the 41st year the world renowned 10k race has been held in this city.

Matt Rinard has had numerous one-man shows in Las Vegas, New Orleans, Los Angeles, Gronau, Bonn, and Berlin. He is the official artist for the New Orleans parade Barkus. He was the official artist for the New Orleans Ironman 70.3. He was the official artist for the French Quarter Festival for six straight years 1991 to 1997. He was the official artist for the Crescent City Classic in 1999.

== Philanthropic events ==
Matt Rinard helped raise money for several nonprofit organizations. In 1998 he became the official artist for The Krewe of Barkus. Since then, the organization has raised over 1 million dollars to donate to local animal shelters. In 2019 and 2022 he won Mr. Legs for Bridgehouse/Gracehouse collectively raising over $350,000 for their substance abuse center. He is on the board of several nonprofit organizations in New Orleans and aides in procuring money for Hogs for the Cause the number one fundraiser for Pediatric Cancer Outreach. In addition to these charities Matt helps the New Orleans Ballet Association and The Royal Street Arts District. His greatest commitment however will always be for the welfare of animals.
