= The End of Men =

2012 book by Hanna Rosin

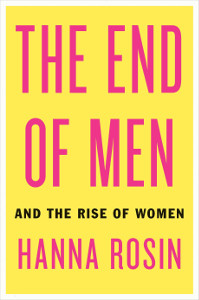
- Author: Hanna Rosin
- Published: 2012 (Riverhead Books)
- Pages: 326 pp.
- ISBN: 978-1-59463-183-2
- OCLC: 859157647

The End of Men: And the Rise of Women is a book by journalist and magazine editor Hanna Rosin, based on her cover story of the same name that appeared in The Atlantic in 2010. It was published by Riverhead Books in 2012. In the book, Rosin argues that patriarchy is coming to an end. She writes about the dominance of women in US schools and workplaces.

== Overview ==
Rosin's text was published in 2012 by Riverhead Books. In the text, she theorizes that women have won the gender war, having "pulled decisively ahead [of men] by almost every measure." Rosin uses the shift in the American economy as one of her main sources. Here, jobs which traditionally held male-led jobs are now lost in the face of the recession and recovery of said economy. Rosin also cites rising college graduation rates, steady employment, and an increased presence in male-dominated fields such as politics and business.

== Reception ==
Carol Tavris writes in the Wall Street Journal that "[Rosin] avoids the journalistic habit of doing 'spotlight interviews' with individuals selected to support the writer's hypothesis, a practice she knows is misleading. Instead, her argument is based on substance and scholarship".

Annalee Newitz of NPR describes the book as "a frustrating blend of genuine insight and breezy, unconvincing anecdotalism" but also that "the book manages to register a cultural shift in the process of happening, which is an exceedingly difficult task".

Writing in The New York Times, Jennifer Homans suggests that The End of Men minimizes important issues still facing women, and that Rosin perpetuates stereotypes about what it means to be a woman such as having a greater ability than men to "sit still and focus".

The Law Review at the Boston University School of Law published a symposium on the book titled, "Evaluating Claims about the 'End of Men'." It included an article titled, "The End of Men Is Not True," by sociologist Philip N. Cohen.

Writing in 2021, after a year in which more women than men lost jobs due to the COVID-19 recession, Rosin referred to her "tragic naïveté" in writing the book.
