= Scratchboard =

Art technique

Scratchboard or scraperboard or scratch art is a form of direct engraving in which the artist scratches off dark ink to reveal a white or colored layer beneath. The technique uses sharp knives and tools for engraving into the scratchboard, which is usually cardboard covered in a thin layer of white China clay coated with black India ink. Scratchboard can yield highly detailed, precise and evenly textured artwork. Works can be left black and white, or colored.

== History ==
Modern scraperboard originated in the 19th century in Britain and France. As printing methods developed, scraperboard became a popular medium for reproduction replacing wood engraving, metal engraving, and linocut. It allowed for a fine line appearance that could be photographically reduced for reproduction without losing quality. It was most effective and expeditious for use in single-color book and newspaper printing. From the 1930s to 1950s, it was a preferred technique for medical, scientific and product illustration. During that period, Virgil Finlay made detailed illustrations, often combining scraperboard methods with traditional pen & ink technique. More recently, it has been used for editorial illustrators of magazines, ads, graphic novels, and one of a kind pieces of fine art.

== Technique ==
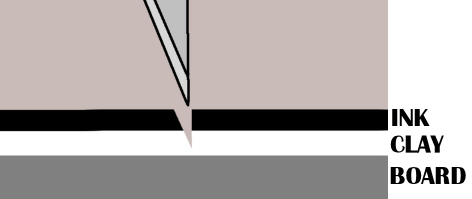
Cross section of scratchboard. By removing the black ink with a sharp tool, the artist exposes the white clay.

Unlike many drawing media, where the artist adds in the mid-tones and shadows, with scratchboard the artist is working by adding in the highlights.

The artist can use a variety of tools to scratch away the black ink from the board and reveal more or less of the white clay that is underneath. Effects include stippling by poking the board with a needle or blade, and scratching or cross-hatching using a sharp blade.

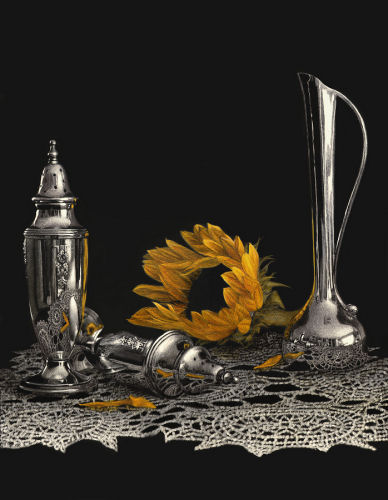
Sunflower and Silver by Diana Lee

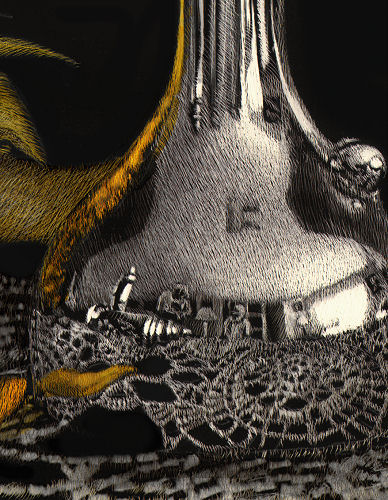
A detail of Sunflower and Silver to show scratching technique

== Artists ==
Illustrators who have worked in the scratchboard medium include Michael McCurdy, Peter Blake, Virgil Finlay, John Schoenherr, Jos Sances, Sven Rayen and Scott McKowen. The comics artist Jacques Tardi used scratchboard to illustrate Jules Verne's science fiction in the style of 19th century woodcuts. Illustrated in scratchboard is the adult non-fiction book, Why Fish Don't Exist by Lulu Miller.

In 2011, the International Society of Scratchboard Artists was launched to help promote scratchboard art, and to educate the public about the medium. The organization holds an annual exhibition of scratchboard art.
