= Deed poll =

Legal document binding only to a single person or party

In many common law jurisdictions, a deed poll (plural: deeds poll) or deed of declaration is a legal document binding on a single person or several persons acting jointly to express an intention or create an obligation. A deed poll is not a contract, but works like one—it binds the party making the deed. A deed poll is not made between two parties. Deeds poll are not used in the United States.

== Etymology ==
The term "deed", also known in this context as a "specialty", is common to signed written undertakings not supported by consideration: the seal (even if not a literal wax seal but only a notional one referred to by the execution formula, "signed, sealed and delivered", or even merely "executed as a deed") is deemed to be the consideration necessary to support the obligation. "Poll" is an archaic legal term referring to documents with straight edges; these distinguished a deed binding only one person from one affecting more than a single person (an "indenture", so named during the time when such agreements would be written out repeatedly on a single sheet, then the copies separated by being irregularly torn or cut, i.e. "indented", so that each party had a document with corresponding tears, to discourage forgery).

== Use for changing name ==
The most common use is a name change through a deed of change of name (often referred to simply as a deed poll). Deeds poll are used for this purpose in countries and regions including the United Kingdom (except in Scotland), Ireland, Hong Kong, and Singapore. In the UK, a deed poll can also be used to change a child's name, provided that everyone with parental responsibility for the child consents and the child has no objection. The child's parents execute the deed poll on the child's behalf. In some other jurisdictions, a person may simply start using a new name without any formal legal process. The usual requirements are that the new name must be used exclusively and that the change must not be made with the intent to defraud. In English law, a person must notify every creditor of a change of name by deed poll.

In Australia, prior to 1 November 2000, name change was accomplished by deed poll but is now done by completing a Change of Name form.

== Other uses ==
Another common use is to partition land. This form of deed poll is commonly used in Hong Kong.

A deed poll may also be used (in England and Wales) for clergy of the Church of England to relinquish their holy orders.

Bonds and powers of attorney are examples of deeds poll. A will is not a deed poll, not being made under seal, and being subject to separate statutory requirements.
