= Invisibilia =

Radio program and audio podcast

- Running time: approximately 60 minutes
- Country of origin: United States
- Language: English
- Syndicates: National Public Radio
- Hosted by: Kia Miakka Natisse; Yowei Shaw; Alix Spiegel (former); Hanna Rosin (former); Lulu Miller (former)
- Produced by: Abby Wendel; Andrew Mambo; Ariana Gharib Lee
- Edited by: Neena Pathak
- Senior editor: Anne Gudenkauf
- Original release: 2015 – 2023
- No. of series: 9
- No. of episodes: 62
- Audio format: Stereophonic
- Website: www.npr.org/programs/invisibilia/
- Podcast: Invisibilia Podcast Directory

Invisibilia is a radio program and podcast from National Public Radio. It debuted in early 2015 and explored "the intangible forces that shape human behavior—things like ideas, beliefs, assumptions and emotions." The program's title comes from Latin, meaning "the invisible things." The Guardian ranked Invisibilia among "the 10 best new podcasts of 2015." In its seventh season, the program was hosted by Kia Miakka Natisse and Yowei Shaw; previous season hosts included Lulu Miller, Alix Spiegel and Hanna Rosin.

== Background ==
Alix Spiegel was a founding producer of This American Life and freelanced for NPR's Science Desk covering psychology and human behavior. At Chicago's Third Coast International Audio Festival, Spiegel met former Radiolab producer Lulu Miller and asked her to co-produce a piece she was working on. The two began collaborating on radio stories and conceived of a new long-form program that would become Invisibilia. The show's first six-episode season aired from January to February 2015, with excerpts occasionally running on All Things Considered, Morning Edition, Radiolab and This American Life. This extra exposure and Miller and Spiegel's track record helped Invisibilia debut at #1 on the iTunes podcast chart and to maintain a consistent top-ten ranking in the months following its launch. Hanna Rosin from The Atlantic joined as cohost for the second season, which premiered in June 2016 and ran for seven episodes. The third season debuted in June 2017 with Spiegel and Rosin as hosts. The Atlantic included the episode "How to Become Batman" on their list of "The 50 Best Podcast Episodes of 2015".

In June 2020, NPR announced that Spiegel and Rosin would relinquish their roles by early 2021, and Kia Miakka Natisse and Yowei Shaw were named the new co-hosts of the program, which aired its seventh season in April 2021. The show aired its eighth season in September 2021.

In March 2023, NPR announced the cancellation of Invisibilia as part of larger effort to cut costs. The final episode titled The Goodbye Show, was released on April 27, 2023.

=== Awards ===
Award	Year	Category	Result	Ref.
Academy of Podcasters Awards	2017	Science & Medicine	Finalist	
Academy of Podcasters Awards	2016	Science & Medicine	Won	
iHeartRadio Podcast Awards	2022	Best Science Podcast	Nominated	
iHeartRadio Podcast Awards	2021	Best Science Podcast	Nominated	
iHeartRadio Podcast Awards	2020	Best Science Podcast	Nominated	
Peabody Awards	2015	Podcasts & Radio	Nominated	

== Episodes ==
=== Season 1 (2015) ===
1. The Secret History of Thoughts
2. Fearless
3. How to Become Batman
4. Entanglement
5. The Power of Categories
6. Our Computers, Ourselves

=== Season 2 (2016) ===
1. The New Norm
2. The Personality Myth
3. The Problem with the Solution
4. Frame of Reference
5. Flip the Script
6. The Secret Emotional Life of Clothes
7. Outside In

=== Season 3 (2017) ===
1. True You
2. Future Self
3. The Culture Inside
4. Reality
5. Bubble-Hopping (Reality Part 2)
6. Emotions
7. High Voltage (Emotions Part 2)

=== Season 4 (2018) ===
1. I, I, I. Him
2. The Other Real World
3. What Was Not Said
4. The Pattern Problem
5. Everything Good
6. The Callout

=== Season 5 (2019) ===
1. The Fifth Vital Sign
2. Post, Shoot
3. The Weatherman
4. The Remote Control Brain
5. A Very Offensive Rom-Com
6. The End of Empathy
7. Kraftland
8. The Profile
9. Back When I Was Older
10. Love and Lapses
11. Raising Devendra

=== Season 6 (2020) ===
1. Two Heartbeats a Minute
2. The Confrontation
3. An Unlikely Superpower
4. White v. White?
5. The Reluctant Immortalist
6. The Last Sound
7. Trust Fall

=== Season 7 (2021) ===
1. Eat the Rich
2. The Chaos Machine: An Endless Hole
3. The Chaos Machine (part 2): Wrathful Lord
4. The Chaos Machine (part 3): A Looping Revolt
5. The Great Narrative Escape
6. American Slow Radio (Bonus Episode)

=== Season 8 (2021) ===
1. A Friendly Ghost Story
2. Nun of Us Are Friends
3. International Friend of Mystery
4. Friends with Benefits
5. Poop Friends
6. Therapy, with Friends

=== Season 9 (2022) ===
1. The P-Word
2. A Little Bit Pregnant
3. Therapy Ghostbusters
4. Freedom Diving
5. Power Tools

=== Finale (2023) ===
- The Goodbye Show
