= Fire Party =

American post-hardcore band

- Origin: Washington, D.C. United States
- Genres: Punk rock; Post-hardcore; Emo
- Years active: 1986–1990
- Label: Dischord Records
- Past members: Natalie Avery; Amy Pickering; Kate Samworth; Nicky Thomas

Fire Party was a post-hardcore band from Washington, D.C. They were together from the autumn of 1986 to the spring of 1990. The band members were Amy Pickering (vocals), Natalie Avery (guitar), Kate Samworth (bass), and Nicky Thomas (drums).

== History ==
Amy Pickering was involved in the D.C. hardcore scene as a high school student at H-B Woodlawn. She then went on to work at Dischord Records. On her first day of work there, she tore down a sign that said "No Skirts Allowed". Oman Emmet, previously known as Tomas Squip of Beefeater, named Pickering as "the mother of the revolution" for her role in what became known as Revolution Summer in 1985, and he credited Pickering with "setting a season into motion." "Revolution Summer" had been a phrase Pickering used in notes she sent out to people in the D.C. punk scene to reflect "a climax, the end of something" and to re-inspire punks in D.C. It led to events like the punk percussion protest which protested Apartheid in South Africa and President Ronald Reagan.

Before Nicky Thomas joined Fire Party, she previously played in bands such as Lebensluste and In Pieces.

Pickering joined with Avery, Samworth, and Thomas to form Fire Party which, according to Avery, "grew out of this really tight-knit group of people very much shaped by a very small music scene". The band made their debut in February 1987 at d.c. space and their set was dedicated to the recently deceased Toni Young, a former member of the bands Red C and Dove, as well as one of the few women of color in the D.C. punk scene at the time.

Fire Party released a six-song self-titled mini-LP, an eight-song album (New Orleans Opera) while together. They played some Midwest shows with Scream, and in early 1988, they toured Europe with them and also supported That Petrol Emotion. While in Europe, they recorded a session for John Peel's BBC Radio 1 show. File 13, a punk fanzine from Massachusetts, referred to Fire Party as "one of the most powerful groups around today" in a review of New Orleans Opera, which the zine also cited as one of its favorite releases of 1989.

A self-titled compilation of the tracks from their two albums plus their Peel session and "Pilate" from the State of the Union compilation was released by Dischord in 1996.

Despite their small discography, Fire Party, along with related "Revolution Summer" bands like Embrace and Rites of Spring, had a lasting influence on the artistic direction of American punk. Apart from being an all-female band, a rarity in punk music at the time, drummer Nicky Thomas was also one of the few African American women involved in the punk music scene. Jenny Toomey, musician and co-founder of the Simple Machines record label, described Fire Party as "the world's first female-fronted emo band."

== Discography ==
- Fire Party mini-LP (May 1988), Dischord
- New Orleans Opera mini-LP/cassette (October 1989), Dischord

Compilations

- Fire Party CD (October 1996), Dischord - compiles both albums with five additional tracks
