= Scott McKowen =

Scott McKowen (born January 16, 1956) is an American illustrator, art director, and graphic designer. He was born and raised in Michigan, and his studio is in Stratford, Ontario. He designs posters for theaters and other performing arts companies across North America, and he creates illustration for books and magazines. He is known for his drawings on scratchboard, a process in which he uses a knife blade to carve white lines onto a black board. It is somewhat similar to engraving or woodcutting, in the sense that images are formed by carving white lines. In the last stages, color is often added to the illustrations.

== Posters ==
He has designed theatre posters for the Shaw Festival in Niagara-on-the-Lake, New York’s Roundabout Theatre, Pearl Theatre (New York City), Great Lakes Theater, Denver Center Theatre Company, The Acting Company, Arena Stage, Seattle Repertory Theatre, The Goodman Theatre in Chicago, Center Theatre Group in Los Angeles, and regional theaters in major cities in the United States and Canada. He has done extensive work for The National Ballet of Canada, National Arts Centre, The Canadian Stage Company, and Theatre Calgary.

Describing his technique for creating theatre posters he has said, “I think of the play as a road map for any graphic design assignment. The first page of a script usually indicates the time and place in which the story occurs. I read the text to get the story in my head, but at the same time I’m watching for clues from the playwright about the world of the play.”

== Book illustration ==
He has created illustrations for a variety of projects including book covers. He has illustrated the covers of over thirty books, including The Adventures of Huckleberry Finn, Alice in Wonderland, Oliver Twist, Peter Pan, Around the World in Eighty Days, Anne of Avonlea, as well as Neil Gaiman’s comic book series Marvel 1602. A recent project is to illustrate a series of children’s classics for Sterling Publishing.

== Biography ==
McKowen was born in 1957 in Lansing, Michigan. He attended Elmhurst Elementary School in Lansing, then Dwight Rich Junior High School and then Sexton High School. His father taught at Sexton, and directed musicals. McKowen says, “I think that’s where I got the theater bug”. McKowen's first graphics assignment for which he was paid was the creation of a theatre poster for a high school production of the musical comedy Once upon a Mattress. His mother was a professional sign painter, and he credits her for giving him an appreciation for typography and how it can be used.

As a freshman in college, he and another art student, Sam Viviano, turned out silk screened posters for the theater department. Viviano went on to work as the art director at Mad Magazine in New York City. McKowen graduated from the University of Michigan School of Art in Ann Arbor, with a Bachelor of Fine Arts, magna cum laude. After college, and while living in Ann Arbor, Michigan, he would travel 200 miles north to see theatre in Stratford, Ontario. One year he brought his portfolio along and was offered a job designing theatre posters. This was his break into the world of professional graphic illustration.

McKowen is known to create images that “capture the essence” of plays by authors that include Shakespeare, Shaw, Chekhov, and Molière. He has described that while working with pen and ink in the 1980s, he began to feel frustrated that his lines were too delicate for the graphic strength that he wanted, and so he took up scratchboard. Noted illustrator, Milton Glaser, has said that “Scott McKowen is one of the great illustrators of our time”

In 2002, McKowen curated Worth a Thousand Words, an exhibition of international theatre posters at Gallery Stratford, the Design Exchange in downtown Toronto, and at the National Arts Centre in Ottawa. He was commissioned by the Royal Canadian Mint to design Canada’s 2001 silver dollar, commemorating The National Ballet of Canada’s fiftieth Anniversary.

McKowen's wife, Christina Poddubiuk, is a theatre set and costume designer and has an honors English degree. Together they have a design studio, Punch & Judy. A selection of McKowen's works is featured in A Fine Line: Scratchboard Illustrations..
