= Alix Spiegel =

American radio producer

- Born: August 18, 1971 (age 55); Baltimore, Maryland, U.S.
- Presenting career
- Show: Invisibilia; This American Life; The Daily
- Network: National Public Radio
- Time slot: Syndication
- Style: Presenter
- Country: United States

Alix Spiegel is an American public radio producer and science journalist. She currently works for This American Life. Spiegel previously hosted and produced the NPR program Invisibilia with Lulu Miller and Hanna Rosin. She was one of the early producers of This American Life, then went on to work for National Public Radio and The New York Times, ultimately returning to This American Life as a senior producer in 2021.

== Biography ==
Spiegel grew up in Baltimore, Maryland in a secular Jewish household. Her father was the great-grandson of Joseph Spiegel, the founder of the Spiegel Catalog, and her mother is Gabrielle Spiegel, former American Historical Association president and renowned French medieval historian. Her great-aunt was civil rights activist Polly Spiegel Cowan. She studied the violin seriously from a very young age at the Peabody Preparatory in Baltimore, but quit to go to college.

After graduating from Oberlin College, Spiegel moved to Chicago, where she saw an announcement in a newspaper about a fledgling local show for WBEZ called Your American Playhouse: Documentaries About American Life. In 1995 Spiegel began correspondence with the show's producer, Ira Glass, who took her on as an intern. In 1996 the show changed its name to This American Life and was picked up nationally by Public Radio International, by which time Spiegel was producing pieces for the show. That year Spiegel and the show's other producers won the George Foster Peabody Award

In 2002, Spiegel won the Livingston Award for episode #204 "81 Words" about Spiegel's own grandfather, Dr. John Patrick Spiegel, who had a hand in removing homosexuality from the Diagnostic and Statistical Manual of Mental Disorders. In 2007, she won the Alfred I. duPont–Columbia University Award for the segment, "Which One of These is Not Like the Others?" for episode #322, "Shouting Across the Divide."

During her years on NPR's science desk Spiegel covered psychology and human behavior, with an emphasis on looking at how ideas about emotions come into existence and evolve. At Chicago's Third Coast International Audio Festival, Spiegel met former Radiolab producer Lulu Miller and asked her to co-produce a piece she was working on. The two began collaborating on radio stories and conceived of a new long-form program that would become Invisibilia. The show's first six-episode season aired from January to February 2015, with excerpts occasionally running on All Things Considered, Morning Edition, Radiolab and This American Life. This extra exposure and Miller and Spiegel's track record helped Invisibilia debut at #1 on the iTunes podcast chart and to maintain a consistent top-ten ranking in the months following its launch. In March 2023, NPR announced the cancellation of Invisibilia as part of larger effort to cut costs. The final episode titled The Goodbye Show, was released on April 27, 2023.

In 2008 she won the Robert F. Kennedy Journalism Award for her piece "Stuck and Suicidal in a Post-Katrina Trailer Park". In 2010 she won the Erikson Institute Prize for Excellence in Mental Health Media. In 2021 she won a John B Oakes award from Columbia University for her environmental reporting. In 2022, after returning to This American Life, she was on the team that produced "The Pink House at the Center of the World", an episode about the overturn of Roe v. Wade that won a Peabody. Spiegel's science reporting has also been featured in The New York Times and The New Yorker.
