= Why Fish Don't Exist =

2020 memoir by Lulu Miller

- First edition cover of Why Fish Don't Exist
- Author: Lulu Miller
- Illustrator: Kate Samworth
- Language: English
- Genre: Memoir
- Publisher: Pushkin Press
- Publication date: April 30, 2020
- Publication place: United States
- Pages: 225
- ISBN: 978-1501160271
- Dewey Decimal: 590.92
- LC Class: QL31.J6 M55

Why Fish Don't Exist: A Story of Loss, Love, and the Hidden Order of Life is a 2020 personal memoir written by American science reporter and author Lulu Miller and illustrated by scratchboard artist Kate Samworth. It incorporates the life and work of 19th century eugenicist and fish taxonomist David Starr Jordan, exploring the search for objective meaning and order "against the chaos of the world". The memoir was published by Pushkin Press. In 2025, it was longlisted for the Women's Prize for Non-Fiction.

== Synopsis ==
The book has a non-linear narrative structure, interspersing Miller's account of Jordan's life with personal anecdotes, including her experience with depression and her relationship with her father, Chris Miller, who manages to find beauty in life despite his belief that it is meaningless.

Throughout her memoir, Miller grapples with the conflict between her admiration for Jordan's relentless determination in his work and her research into his alleged involvement in the death of Jane Stanford, and his ardent support for eugenics. Examining the psychological debate around "positive illusions" and Jordan's fixation on the preservation of biological hierarchy, she warns against his dogmatic and certain approach to order, pointing to recent scientific breakthroughs that have diminished the existence of fish as a distinct evolutionary category as evidence that "nature is more boundless and bountiful than anything we can imagine". Miller concludes, contrary to the beliefs of both her father and Jordan, that, whilst the universe is fundamentally chaotic, the subjective search for meaning is attainable, through our interpersonal relationships with one another and curiosity for the world around us.

== Reception ==
In 2020, Why Fish Don't Exist was a finalist for the LA Times Book Prize for Science and Technology. In 2022, it was chosen as one of the novels for Stanford's Three Books program, on the theme of biodiversity. Booklist described it as "gripping, and sure to be on readers' minds long after the final pages" whilst Folio Prize winner Carmen Maria Machado described it as "a sumptuous, surprising delight". Writing for the Wall Street Journal, Christoph Irmscher wrote: "leavened by a healthy dose of self-irony, Ms. Miller wields this familiar format with panache, spinning a tale so seductive that I read her book in one sitting". New York Times bestselling author Mary Roach commented: "this book is perfect, just perfect. It's both lyrical and learned, personal and political, small and huge, quirky and profound".

== See also ==
- David Starr Jordan
- Lulu Miller
- Kate Samworth
