= Lulu Miller =

American writer and journalist

- Born: Louisa Elizabeth Miller
- Education: Swarthmore College (BA) University of Virginia (MFA)
- Spouse: Grace Miller
- Awards: Peabody Award
- Presenting career
- Show: Invisibilia; Radiolab
- Network: National Public Radio
- Time slot: Syndication
- Style: Presenter
- Country: United States

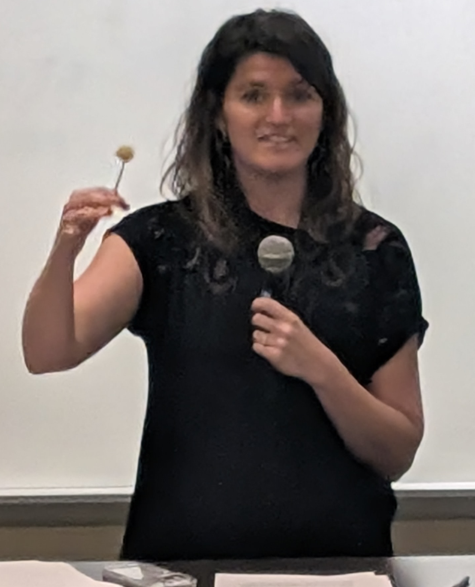
Lulu Miller as the keynote speaker at Purdue University Northwest Hammond Campus, Days of Discovery Research Symposium, April 16, 2026. Miller discussed the beauty of life, nature, and her bestselling book Why Fish Don't Exist.

Louisa Elizabeth "Lulu" Miller is an American science journalist and author. With Latif Nasser, she co-hosts the WNYC program Radiolab, for which she shared in a Peabody Award in 2010 as a staff producer. She co-founded the NPR show Invisibilia with Alix Spiegel.

== Early life and education ==
Miller grew up in Newton, Massachusetts. She is the daughter of two professors, one in sciences and one in humanities. She attended Swarthmore College, where she received the Beik Prize for a research paper titled "The Troubles By Our Women: The Urban Male Perspective on Independent Women in Independent Nigeria" in 2005. She graduated with a degree in history.

== Career ==
After college, she moved to Brooklyn, New York, where an interest in sculpture led her to answer a craigslist ad from a woodworker seeking an assistant. She spent her hours at the woodworking shop listening to the radio, and toward the end of her year working there, she heard Radiolab, which was then a local show on WNYC. She wrote them a letter asking if she could volunteer, and started as an intern, going in one day a week to answer emails and to record CDs, and eventually became the show's first hired producer. Radiolab won a Peabody Award in 2010, while she was one of its producers.

After five years at Radiolab, Miller left to pursue writing via a fellowship at the University of Virginia (UVA), where she taught and wrote fiction, earning a Master of Fine Arts in 2013. Before moving to Virginia, she spent a summer cycling across the United States, a trip that she documented and featured parts of on Radiolab.

After two years at UVA, Miller returned to radio as a freelance journalist for NPR's science desk. On a trip to the Third Coast International Audio Festival in Chicago, she met former This American Life producer Alix Spiegel, who asked Miller to produce a piece she was working on. The two began working on radio stories together and began to conceive a new long-form radio show that would become Invisibilia. Launched in January 2015, the show focused on "the unseen forces that control human behavior." Excerpts of Invisibilia were featured on All Things Considered, Morning Edition, Radiolab, and This American Life; it debuted at #1 on the iTunes podcast chart and held a consistent top-ten ranking in the months following its launch.

In March 2023, NPR announced the cancellation of Invisibilia as part of larger effort to cut costs. The final episode titled The Goodbye Show, was released on April 27, 2023.

In 2020, she published Why Fish Don't Exist, a personal memoir incorporating the life and work of David Starr Jordan.

Following the retirement of Jad Abumrad in January 2022, Miller became a co-host of Radiolab alongside producer Latif Nasser.

== Personal life ==
Miller is an ophidiophobe, a person with a fear of snakes. She lives in the Chicago area with her wife, Grace, and their two sons.
