= Auseklis Ozols =

American painter (1941–2025)

- Born: September 22, 1941; Strenči, German-occupied Latvia
- Died: September 24, 2025 (aged 84); New Orleans, Louisiana, U.S.
- Education: Pennsylvania Academy of the Fine Arts; University of Pennsylvania (BFA); Temple University (MFA)
- Known for: Fine Arts Painter and Teacher
- Spouse: Gwendolyn Laan (died 1980)
- Children: 3, including Saskia

Auseklis Ozols (September 22, 1941 – September 24, 2025) was a Latvian-born American artist and academic based in New Orleans. Ozols was active in the fields of oil painting, watercolor painting, ink and photography.

== Life and career ==
Auseklis Ozols was born in Strenči, Latvia, on September 22, 1941, during the German occupation. To escape subsequent Soviet rule, Ozols and his family immigrated to the United States in 1950, eventually settling in Trenton, New Jersey where he was raised. Ozols graduated in 1961 from the Trenton School of Industrial Arts. In 1965, Ozols went on to earn a Bachelor of Fine Arts from the University of Pennsylvania and the Pennsylvania Academy of Fine Arts, before receiving a Master of Fine Arts in 1969 from Temple University.

Ozols moved to New Orleans in 1970, where he married Gwendolyn Laan (born 1950); they had three daughters, one of whom is artist Saskia Ozols. Gwendolyn Laan Ozols died in 1980.

Inspired by Thomas Eakins and the Pennsylvania Academy of Fine Arts, Ozols founded the New Orleans Academy of Fine Arts in 1978. Ozols also designed The Academy Gallery, located inside the New Orleans Academy of Fine Arts. The school is still in operation today.

Ozols’ works have been included in public and private collections internationally. In New Orleans, he has received the Delgado Award from the New Orleans Museum of Art, the Strength in Age Award, and the Community Arts Award from the Arts Council of New Orleans. His works have been displayed at the Louisiana Governor's Mansion, the New Orleans Museum of Art, the New Jersey State Museum, and the Latvian Museum of Art in Riga, Latvia.

Ozols lost the sight of his right eye in 2012, but continued to paint and teach afterwards. He retired from his work with the New Orleans Academy in 2020. Noteworthy students of Ozols include Kate Samworth and Matt Rinard.

Ozols died of heart failure at his home in New Orleans, Louisiana, on September 24, 2025, two days after his 84th birthday.
