= The Best American Magazine Writing 2007 =

- Book cover
- Author: American Society of Magazine Editors
- Language: English
- Series: The Best American Magazine Writing
- Subject: Investigative journalism
- Genre: Non-fiction
- Publisher: Columbia University Press
- Publication date: 2007
- Publication place: United States
- Media type: Paperback
- Pages: 520
- ISBN: 978-0-231-14391-2
- OCLC: 154711228
- Preceded by: The Best American Magazine Writing 2006
- Followed by: The Best American Magazine Writing 2008

The Best American Magazine Writing 2007 is a non-fiction book published by Columbia University Press, and edited by the American Society of Magazine Editors. It features recognized high-quality journalism pieces from the previous year. The book includes an account by journalist William Langewiesche of Vanity Fair about a controversial United States military operation in Iraq, an investigative journalism article for Rolling Stone by Janet Reitman, a piece published in Esquire by C.J. Chivers about the Beslan school hostage crisis, and an article by Christopher Hitchens about survivors of Agent Orange.

The book received a positive reception, and a review in Publishers Weekly commented, "All of the essays ... exhibit a timeless prose in the midst of meeting deadlines. But many also resonate with a special sense of timeliness". A review in The Irish Times concluded, "the best in this volume stands with the best anywhere, essays with the compulsive readability of a good novel, but the immediacy and moral power of good journalism." The Best American Magazine Writing 2007 also received a positive review from The Independent and The Daily Yomiuri praised the readability and organization of the work.

== Publication history ==
The book was published in 2007 by Columbia University Press. It was made available as a free download online by WorldofBooks.

== Contents ==
The Best American Magazine Writing 2007 features high-quality pieces from the previous year, including: an account by journalist William Langewiesche of Vanity Fair titled "Rules of Engagement", about the killing of resident citizens in Haditha, Iraq by United States military; an investigative journalism article for Rolling Stone by Janet Reitman, a piece published in Esquire by C.J. Chivers titled "The School", regarding an incident where Chechen terrorists held children hostage for three days in a school in Beslan, Russia; and an article "Karl Lagerfeld, Boy Prince of Fashion" for New York by Vanessa Grigoriadis about Karl Lagerfeld's personal and business practices.

Additional articles featured in the work include: a biographical study of climber Reinhold Messner by journalist Caroline Alexander, titled, "Murdering the Impossible"; an article by Christopher Hitchens on survivors of Agent Orange; "The Loved Ones" by Tom Junod, about criminal activities by nursing homes in New Orleans, Louisiana following Hurricane Katrina; "The Other Side of Hate" by Andrew Corsello in GQ, discussing interactions between a black priest and white farmer in Zimbabwe during a time of strife in the country; "Rhymes with Rich" by Sandra Tsing Loh in Atlantic Monthly, about attitudes of wealthy introspective mothers; "Our Oceans are Turning into Plastic . . . Are We?" by Susan Casey in Best Life, about concerns regarding the Earth's environmental issues; and "Russell and Mary" by Michael Donohue, an essay by the journalist about his project assembling a profile of his landlady's life from her effects. The works in the book consist of the finalists and winners from the yearly awards process of the American Society of Magazine Editors.

== Reception ==
A review of the book in Publishers Weekly was favorable, and commented, "All of the essays ... exhibit a timeless prose in the midst of meeting deadlines. But many also resonate with a special sense of timeliness". Contributing editor of The Quarterly Conversation Elizabeth Wadell reviewed the book, and commented, "these articles almost unanimously engage". Wadell lamented that the profile of Karl Lagerfeld by Vanessa Grigoriadis seemed lighter fare compared to the rest of the articles in the book, "Though it is cleverly written, it really does seem to be, well, all style." Wadell recommended the book for readers, and observed, "You can skip a lot of articles in a magazine and still feel that you 'got through' the whole thing; a book isn't over till it's over. So how then, should we read the Best American Magazine Articles? Out of order, I'd say, skipping at least one article, but keeping it to read again." Colin Murphy reviewed the book for The Irish Times, and wrote favorably of the piece by Christopher Hitchens on Agent Orange. Murphy also wrote positively of the book as a whole, and his review concluded, "the best in this volume stands with the best anywhere, essays with the compulsive readability of a good novel, but the immediacy and moral power of good journalism."

"the best in this volume stands with the best anywhere, essays with the compulsive readability of a good novel, but the immediacy and moral power of good journalism."

— The Irish Times

Christopher Hirst gave the book a positive review, in a piece for The Independent, though he cautioned British readers as to the difference from the style of journalism they are used to, writing, "For anyone accustomed to the brevity of British journalism, these 20 features may seem grandiose in scale." He wrote favorably of the article on the Beslan terrorism siege, commenting, "Running to 56 pages, CJ Chivers's investigation of the 2004 Chechen school siege is hypnotic, like a slow-motion horror film." Hirst concluded his review, "Magazine journalism is one of the things that America does very well indeed." In a review for The Daily Yomiuri, Cristoph Mark praised the writing style, readability, and organization of the book, commenting, "Despite being nearly 500 pages, the collection is an incredibly quick read that leaves you both sad to finish the story you've just ended and yet happy to start anew, a feeling largely aided by the editors' innate ability to pace the order of the articles effectively, lightening the mood or going in for the punch as needed." Kurt Rabin of The Free Lance–Star stated the publication was one of his three favorites of the year, including other compilations The Best American Crime Reporting and The Best American Sports Writing. Xujun Eberlain, writing for New America Media, wrote positively of William Langewiesche's Vanity Fair article, noting it "has a great description" of an incident involving a U.S. soldier operating in Iraq in a location under power of insurgents.

== See also ==
- National Magazine Award
- Graduate School of Journalism at Columbia University
- First Amendment to the United States Constitution
- Freedom of speech
- Freedom of the press
