= New Orleans Academy of Fine Arts =

Art school in New Orleans, Louisiana

Coordinates: 29.9202°N 90.1126°W

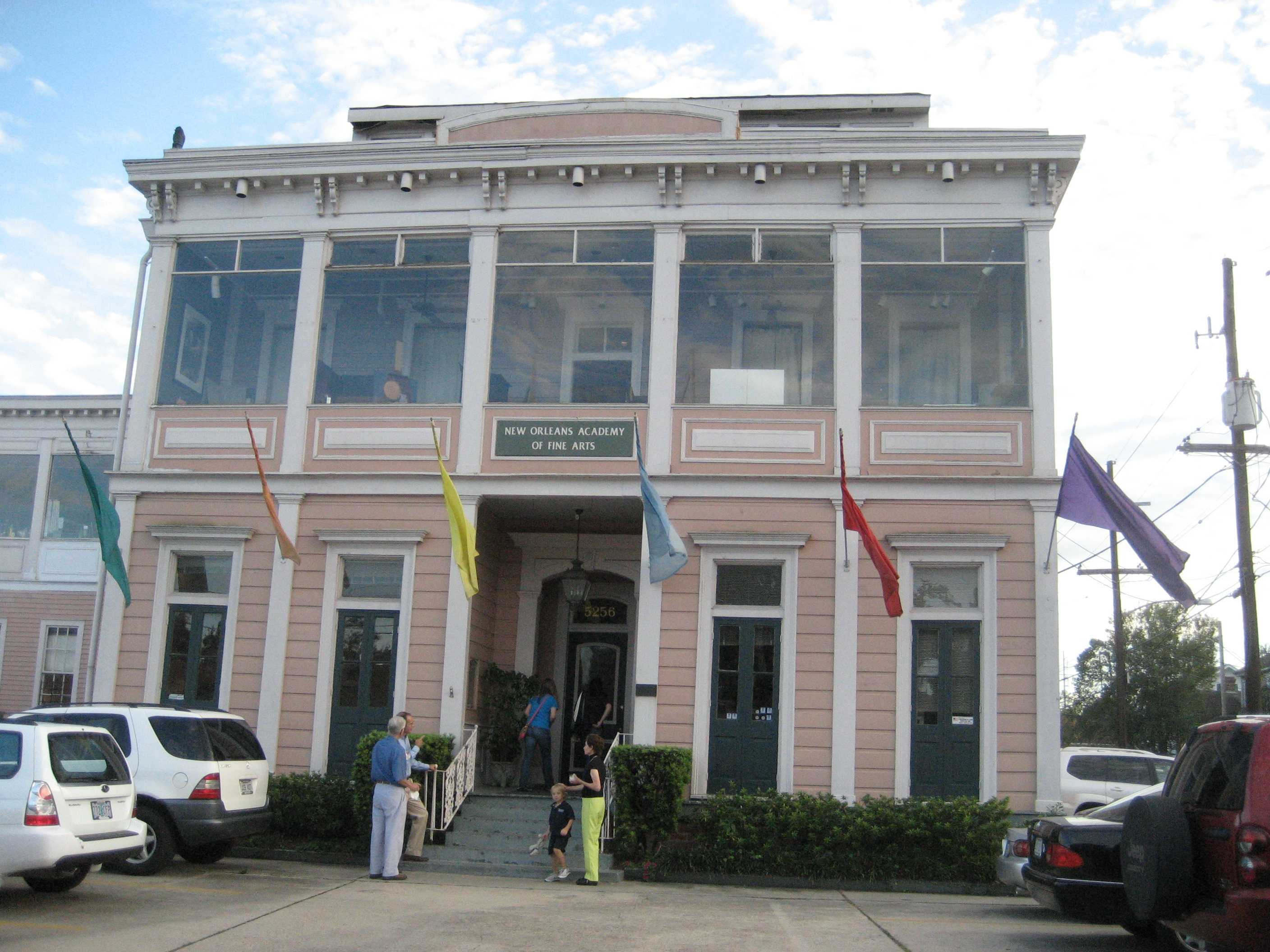
New Orleans Academy of Fine Arts

The New Orleans Academy of Fine Arts (NOAFA) is a private fine arts school located in New Orleans, Louisiana. Established in 1978, the academy offers instruction in traditional art disciplines, emphasizing classical techniques and working from life.

== History ==
The academy was founded in 1978 by artist Auseklis Ozols, who was inspired by the teaching model of Thomas Eakins and the Pennsylvania Academy of Fine Arts. Ozols aimed to create a place in New Orleans dedicated to traditional fine arts education, using classical techniques, with a focus on working from life. Local artist Dell Weller joined Ozols at the academy's founding as one of its original instructors. Initially, the school operated over an Italian restaurant at 3218 Magazine Street. Two years later, Dorothy J. Coleman, a student and philanthropist, provided a three-story Victorian building at 5256 Magazine Street as a new home for the academy. Coleman later became Ozols's partner and served as the school's president when it was incorporated as a non-profit institution in 1980.

The academy's main campus is located at 5256 Magazine Street in Uptown New Orleans.
