= Heir property =

In the US, land passed down without a will

Heirs property, or heirs' property, refers to property that is passed between generations of family members without the involvement of local probate courts, without a will or formal estate strategy. Heir property is commonly viewed as an unstable form of ownership, since co-owners often have limited rights over the property.

== Background ==
Heirs Property occurs when a deceased person's heirs or will beneficiaries become owners of property (also known as real property) as tenants in common. When a property is probated, a deceased person either has a will and the property is passed on to the named beneficiary, or a deceased person dies intestate, without a will, and the property could be split among multiple heirs who become cotenants. If the probate court enters an order of distribution, or if the estate administrator signs a deed, the ownership passes formally. Heirs property cases typically occur because a person dies without a will and the family members do not get the probate courts involved, making the property part of the intestate estate which will be distributed according to state guidelines. Over time, the number of heirs can increase making it difficult for the property to be sold or divided in the future.

One of the biggest problems heirs property owners face are how the property is shared among heirs and how it will be divided or sold in the future. Tenancy in common, a method of owning property, allows each person designated as a tenant in common to own an undivided interest in the whole property, with no limit as to how many tenants in common may also have an interest in the whole property at issue. Properties passed to heirs who become tenants in common may devalue over time because of how divided the property can become, which can impact future generations of heir property owners. Other issues which can arise under tenancy in common include the right for each tenant to sell their share without the permission of other cotentants and the right of any co-tenant to file a lawsuit requesting the property be partitioned by sale and forcibly sold. Partition by sale is a court remedy used when a parcel of land cannot be physically divided, and the proceeds for the sale are distributed proportionally among the cotenants. Cotenants can request another remedy, partition in kind, which would split the property into parcels proportionate to the shares each cotenant has. Partition by sale are more common than partitions by kind due to the economic benefit they pose to the cotenants.

Another issue facing those with shares in heirs property is the fact that the title to the property is rarely ever "clear". This means that the deed for the property may not contain all of the cotenants, or it may even list the deceased property owner still. This can pose difficulty for cotenants to access resources like loans, FEMA assistance in the event of a natural disaster, or other state and federal programs.

== History ==
Beginning in the 1950s state courts began overriding the stated preference for partition in kind, instead favoring partition by sale. Although more convenient for courts, this had the effect of allowing one fractional owner, often a distant family member without a connection to the land, to force a sale against the wishes of all other owners. This has led to a loss of land ownership, a key way to build familial wealth, especially impacting poor communities and communities of color.

=== Uniform Partition of Heirs Property Act ===
In 2010, the Uniform Law Commission drafted a model Uniform Partition of Heirs Property Act. As of 2024, the Uniform Partition of Heirs Property Act has been enacted in 23 states and territories and introduced in an additional 6 states. Among other things, it requires improved procedures for serving notice on heirs and determining fair market value if the co-owners of the property are unable to agree. The purpose of the Act is to prevent partition by sale to the fullest extent possible while there are some cotenants who still wish to live on the land while other cotenants may wish to sell the property. The UPHPA outlines three reforms to the law of partition sales in order to address the process of these sales in practice:

1. If a co-owner brings a partition action in court, the court must provide an opportunity for the other co-owners to buy out the co-owner who brought the action.
2. If there is no buyout, then the law provides a preference for the court to order a partition in kind and divide the property, rather than order a sale.
3. If a partition in kind is not ordered, the UPHPA requires the court to sell the property at a market sale, not at an auction sale, and specifies a process for the property to be appraised and sold for its fair market value.

As stated in the UPHPA, heirs property is defined as:

- "(5) real property held in tenancy in common which satisfies all of the following requirements as of the filing of a partition action:
  - (A) there is no agreement in a record binding all the cotenants which governs the partition of the property
  - (B) one or more of the cotenants acquired title from a relative, whether living or deceased; and
  - (C) Any of the following applies
    - (i) 20 percent or more of the interests are held by cotenants who are relatives
    - (ii) 20 percent or more of the interests are held by an individual who acquired title from a relative, whether living or deceased; or
    - (iii) 20 percent or more of the cotenants are relatives"

The values of 20% are not established values, but were likely chosen by the drafters of the UPHPA in an attempt to define parameters for heirs property for the purpose of the Act.

States which have enacted the Uniform Partition of Heirs Property Act include:
| State | Status of Legislation | Year of Enactment | Bill Number | Title of Bill |
|---|---|---|---|---|
| Nevada | Enacted | 2011 | AB 244 | Enacts the Uniform Partition of Heirs Property Act |
| Georgia | Enacted | 2012 | HB 744 | Uniform Partition of Heirs Property Act |
| Montana | Enacted | 2013 | SB 207 | Adopt Uniform Partition of Heirs Property Act |
| Alabama | Enacted | 2014 | SB 162 | Property, Alabama Uniform Partition of Heirs Property Act, created |
| Arkansas | Enacted | 2015 | HB 1245 | An Act to Enact the Uniform Partition of Heirs Property Act; To Make Related Technical Corrections; and for Other Purposes |
| Connecticut | Enacted | 2015 | SB 900 | An Act Concerning the Adoption of the Uniform Partition of Heirs' Property Act and Estates Given in Fee Tail |
| Hawaii | Enacted | 2016 | SB 2408 | Real Property; Partition; Heirs' Property; Uniform Partition of Heirs Property Act |
| South Carolina | Enacted | 2016 | HB 3325 | Uniform Partition of Heirs Property Act |
| New Mexico | Enacted | 2017 | HB 181 | Uniform Partition of Heirs Property Act |
| Texas | Enacted | 2017 | SB 499 | Relating to the adoption of the Uniform Partition of Heirs' Property Act |
| Iowa | Enacted | 2018 | SF 2175 | A bill for an act relating to partition of property in kind and partition of property by sale |
| Illinois | Enacted | 2019 | HB 3677 | Uniform Partition of Heirs Property Act |
| Missouri | Enacted | 2019 | SB 83 | Modifies provisions relating to court proceedings (note: a section of this bill codifies the Heirs Property Act) |
| US Virgin Islands | Enacted | 2019 | 32-0327 | US Virgin Islands Code Title 28 - Property Chapter 21 - Actions for Partition of Real Property § 451. Right to maintain action for partition |
| Florida | Enacted | 2020 | SB 580 | Uniform Partition of Heirs Property Act |
| Mississippi | Enacted | 2020 | SB 2553 | Uniform Partition of Heir Property Act |
| New York | Enacted | 2020 | SB 4865 | Establishes the uniform partition of heirs property act which supplements the general partition statute and governs actions to partition heirs property |
| Virginia | Enacted | 2020 | HB 1605 | Partition of property; in partition actions the court shall order an appraisal of property |
| California | Enacted | 2021 | AB 633 | Partition of real property: Uniform Partition of Heirs Property Act |
| Maryland | Enacted | 2022 | SB 92/HB 777 | Real Property - Partition of Property |
| Utah | Enacted | 2022 | HB 120 | Uniform Partition of Heirs' Property Act |
| District of Columbia | Enacted | 2023 | B24-0156 | Uniform Partition of Heirs Property Act of 2021 (aka Partition of Real Property Act of 2022) |
| Washington | Enacted | 2023 | SB 5005 | Concerning real property |
| Arizona | Introduced | 2024 | HB 2521 | Partition; property; inheritance (note: if passed, will likely be titled Uniform Partition of Heirs Property Act) |
| Kansas | Introduced | 2024 | HB 2693 | Enacting the uniform partition of heirs property act to prescribe procedures and requirements for partition of certain real property (note: if passed, this Bill may have a different title) |
| Massachusetts | Introduced | 2024 | H 1744/ S 2560 | An Act Relative to Uniform Partition of Heirs Property (note: if passed, this Bill may have a different title) |
| Michigan | Introduced | 2024 | HB 4924 | Revised judicature act of 1961 (note: if passed, this Bill may have a different title) |
| New Jersey | Introduced | 2024 | S 1400 | Uniform Partition of Heirs Property Act (note: if passed, this Bill may have a different title) |
| North Carolina | Introduced | 2024 | H 588/S 548 | Uniform Partition of Heirs Property Act (note if passed, this Bill may have a different title) |

=== 2018 Farm Bill ===
The Agricultural Improvement Act of 2018 (aka the 2018 Farm Bill) was signed into law on December 20, 2018. This bill required the USDA's Farm Service Agency to develop rules allowing heirs' property owners to obtain a farm and tract number, even with cloudy property title. § 12615 of the Agricultural Improvement Act of 2018 delineates the eligibility requirements for operators of heir property land to obtain a farm number in states where the Uniform Partition of Heirs Property Act was enacted. These requirements include:

- a court order which verifies the land as heirs property,
- a certificate from the local deed recorder stating the recorded owner of the property is deceased and at least one heir is attempting to have the land retitled and placed in the name of the rightful heir,
- a tenancy-in-common agreement which was approved by the majority of ownership interests in the property which gives a particular owner the right to manage the property as a farm or ranch,
- tax returns for the farm submitted by the farm operator, self-certification from the farmer stating they have control over the land to operate a farm,
- or any documentation deemed appropriate by the Secretary.

Farm numbers will be allotted so long as any of the above documentation is submitted by the farm operator to demonstrate their control of the land as a farm. By establishing a farm number, heirs property owners will be eligible for several programs and provisions established by the USDA including: targeted funding through farm loans, crop insurance benefits, and conservation program benefits.

Additionally, the Farm Bill established the Heirs' Property Relending Program with the purpose of solving land ownership and succession issues on agricultural land. The process for participating in the program is as follows:

1. The USDA will provide loans to eligible lenders, like cooperative, credit unions, and nonprofit organizations
2. Heirs will apply directly to the lenders, and upon receipt of the loan, will repay the loan at the interest rates set by the lenders
3. Heirs can use the loans to resolve any outstanding issues on the title to the property by financing or consolidating the property
4. Heirs obtain clear legal title after resolving outstanding issues related to the title which then allows for heirs to apply for USDA programs as well as other US government resources like FEMA assistance.

=== Federal Emergency Management Agency ===
In September 2021, FEMA developed guidelines for its agents to accept heirs' property documentation to qualify for disaster relief. Traditionally, FEMA accepts property deeds or titles, mortgage payment booklets, property tax receipts, property tax bill, or real property structure insurance. Now, FEMA will also accept a Will or Affidavit or heirship along with the death certificate of the descendant, which names the person seeking assistance as the heir to the property. Documentation can be dated up to a year before the disaster or within 18 months of assistance following a disaster If an heir has to self-certify their claim to a property because the property is considered to be heirs property, the statement must include the following information:

1. The address of the property affected by a disaster
2. How long the claimant has lived in the (now damaged) home as the primary residence prior to a President's declaration of a natural disaster
3. The claimant and/or co-applicant's name and signature
4. A copy of the decedent's death certificate
5. The elements of the following statements and explanations, reproduced in full below from the FEMA website:
  1. "I have made a good faith effort, in coordination with FEMA, to obtain and provide a copy of acceptable ownership documentation. I was unable to obtain this documentation because [provide an explanation of the circumstances that prevent standard ownership verification]."
  2. "As the nearest relative of the deceased in the line of succession, my ownership includes all the rights and obligations of the deceased. The decedent's name is ________________, and they died on ________________. I understand I must submit the death certificate along with this declaration. I hereby declare under penalty of perjury that the foregoing is true and correct."

This change in FEMA policy will benefit families who are in possession of heirs property, especially in the South. In Black-majority counties impacted by natural disasters, research has demonstrated more than a third of applicants have been denied due to having cloudy title issues on heirs property they have inherited.

=== Impact of heir property on African American communities ===
Historically, African Americans have more commonly let land become heirs’ property, due to a combination of factors, including a lack of access to government services and a distrust of the legal system brought on by systemic discrimination. The legal costs involved in preparing an estate plan may also deter some families from creating one. According to the United States Department of Agriculture, since 1910, the heir property system has been responsible for African American landowners losing 80% of the farming land owned by previous generations. In 1910, 16 million acres were operated by African American farmers, or 14% of farms. In 2023, under 3 million acres are operated by African American farmers and 1.5% of farms. Additional communities impacted by heirs property issues include Native American communities and rural, low-income communities in Appalachia.

However, the prevalence of heir property in some communities may also reflect a personal preference for informal, communal management of land. In African American communities in the South, conflicts resulting from disagreements between heirs may arise commonly when one or more heirs do not live on the property. For individuals who still live on the property and collectively abide by informal rules of property management, heir property may have fewer risks.

Within the Southern United States, about a third of the land owned by African Americans, amounting to about 3.5 million acres, is held in the heirs property system. Arkansas, Mississippi, Alabama, Georgia, South Carolina, Texas, North Carolina, Virginia, Florida, and Louisiana are the states most affected by the confusion of heirs' property.

In Georgia, a 2017 study by the USDA and the Carl Vinson Institute of Government determined that 11-25% of parcels in every Georgia county are probable heirs property. The total tax-appraised value of probable heirs property in Georgia is more than $34 billion. The negative impacts of heirs property affect families and every aspect of community including the functioning of local government, court systems, state departments, banks, businesses, and nonprofits.
