= Longform.org =

American journalism website

Longform.org's logo. The podcast version included a radio wave emanating from the lighthouse.

Longform was an American media company founded in Brooklyn, New York City, in April 2010 by journalists Max Linsky and Aaron Lammer. It operated a longform article recommendation service until January 2022, and hosted an interview podcast with journalists talking about their craft until June 2024.

== Podcast ==
The Longform Podcast, hosted by Linsky and Lammer, along with Evan Ratliff, was launched in 2012 in a makeshift studio at the offices of The Atavist Magazine. It consisted of interviews with journalists talking about their craft. Its 585 episodes were published weekly, with the hosts alternating. Each episode interviewed one journalist, sometimes discussing a single story they'd written and other times their entire oeuvre. It joined the Vox Media Podcast Network in August 2021. It published its last episode in June 2024, at which time The New York Times wrote that it had become "required listening for aspiring and early-career writers who were eager to learn about how the people they looked up to — from veterans of legacy publications to bloggers at new media start-ups — made it to where they were." Owen Lewis, writing for Defector, praised Linsky's "knack for asking unflinching and unexpected questions in a style that comes off as more curious than intrusive". Nicholas Quah wrote for Vulture, "What Longform has created is a historical record of American nonfiction that's so monumental it should really be housed at a university somewhere." He asked various journalists for their favorite episodes, which included one where Linsky interviewed writer Sam Fragoso while accidentally high on edibles.

=== Episodes ===
No.	Title	Original release date
1	"Matthieu Aikins"	2012
2	"Janet Reitman"	2012
3	"David Grann"	2012
4	"Jon Mooallem"	2012
5	"Paul Ford"	2012
6	"Mac McClelland"	2012
7	"Ta-Nehisi Coates"	2012
8	"Gideon Lewis-Kraus"	2012
9	"Jeanne Marie Laskas"	2012
10	"Chris Jones (Live)"	2012
11	"Joshuah Bearman"	2012
12	"Mina Kimes"	2012
13	"Adrian Chen"	2012
14	"David Samuels"	2012
15	"Jonah Weiner"	2012
16	"Pamela Colloff"	2012
17	"Joshua Davis"	2012
18	"Mike Sager"	2012
19	"Choire Sicha"	2012
20	"Patrick Radden Keefe"	2012
21	"Eli Sanders"	2012
22	"Charles Duhigg"	2013
23	"Starlee Kine"	2013
24	"Stephen Rodrick"	2013
25	"Susan Orlean"	2013
26	"Jennifer Gonnerman"	2013
27	"Joshua Topolsky"	2013
28	"Joel Lovell (live)"	2013
29	"Matthew Power"	2013
30	"Keith Gessen"	2013
31	"Emily Nussbaum"	2013
32	"Jake Silverstein"	2013
33	"Rolf Potts"	2013
34	"Molly Young"	2013
35	"Jay Caspian Kang"	2013
36	"Patrick Symmes"	2013
37	"Ann Friedman"	2013
38	"Ted Conover"	2013
39	"Natasha Vargas-Cooper"	2013
40	"Vanessa Grigoriadis"	2013
41	"Jonathan Shainin"	2013
42	"Mat Honan"	2013
43	"Margalit Fox"	2013
44	"Jonathan Abrams"	2013
45	"Chris Heath"	2013
46	"Nicholas Schmidle"	2013
47	"Steve Kandell"	2013
48	"Evan Ratliff"	2013
49	"Brendan I. Koerner"	2013
50	"Edith Zimmerman"	2013
51	"Robert Kolker"	2013
52	"Kelley Benham"	2013
53	"Janet Reitman"	2013
54	"Sean Flynn"	2013
55	"Amy Harmon"	2013
56	"Joshuah Bearman"	2013
57	"Eli Saslow"	2013
58	"Sarah Stillman"	2013
59	"Nancy Jo Sales"	2013
60	"Hamilton Morris"	2013
61	"Cord Jefferson"	2013
62	"Malcolm Gladwell"	2013
63	"Jon Ronson"	2013
64	"Gay Talese"	2013
65	"Elizabeth Wurtzel"	2013
66	"Andy Ward"	2013
67	"Evan Wright"	2013
68	"Monika Bauerlein and Clara Jeffery"	2013
69	"Rachel Aviv"	2013
70	"Amy Wallace"	2013
71	"Jason Fagone"	2013
72	"Andrew Leland"	2013
73	"Joe Sexton"	2013
74	"Jon Mooallem"	2014
75	"George Saunders"	2014
76	"Roger D. Hodge"	2014
77	"Dan P. Lee"	2014
78	"Ariel Levy"	2014
79	"David Kushner"	2014
80	"Wil S. Hylton (live)"	2014
81	"Kevin Roose"	2014
82	"Jennifer Senior"	2014
Special	"Matthew Power, 1974–2014"	2014
83	"Part 1: Pamela Colloff & Mimi Swartz, Live from Austin"	2014
83	"Part 2: Lawrence Wright, Live from Austin"	2014
84	"Sabrina Rubin Erdely"	2014
85	"Tavi Gevinson"	2014
86	"Mattathias Schwartz"	2014
87	"Amanda Hess"	2014
88	"Sam Biddle"	2014
89	"Alice Gregory"	2014
90	"Susan Dominus"	2014
91	"Michael Lewis"	2014
92	"Leslie Jamison"	2014
93	"Michael Paterniti"	2014
94	"Gary Smith"	2014
95	"Wesley Morris"	2014
96	"Nathaniel Rich"	2014
97	"Ta-Nehisi Coates"	2014
98	"Sarah Nicole Prickett"	2014
99	"John Heilemann"	2014
100	"The 100th Episode"	2014
101	"Rachel Kaadzi Ghansah"	2014
102	"Brin-Jonathan Butler"	2014
103	"Adam Higginbotham"	2014
104	"Lewis Lapham"	2014
105	"Ben Anderson"	2014
106	"Zach Baron"	2014
107	"Emily Bazelon"	2014
108	"Sean Wilsey"	2014
109	"Buzz Bissinger"	2014
110	"Chris Hayes"	2014
111	"Anne Helen Petersen"	2014
Special	"The Matthew Power Literary Reporting Award"	2014
112	"Don Van Natta Jr."	2014
113	"Wendy MacNaughton"	2014
114	"Jessica Pressler"	2014
115	"Jen Percy"	2014
116	"Jake Halpern"	2014
117	"Reihan Salam"	2014
118	"Emma Carmichael"	2014
119	"Alec Wilkinson"	2014
120	"Katie J.M. Baker"	2014
121	"Meghan Daum"	2014
122	"Hanna Rosin"	2014
123	"Nicholas Carlson"	2015
124	"Alex Blumberg"	2015
125	"Anand Gopal"	2015
126	"Taffy Brodesser-Akner"	2015
127	"Molly Crabapple"	2015
128	"Jack Shafer"	2015
129	"Rukmini Callimachi (Part 1)"	2015
129	"Rukmini Callimachi (Part 2)"	2015
130	"Mac McClelland"	2015
131	"Josh Dean"	2015
132	"Erik Larson"	2015
133	"Adam Platt"	2015
134	"Dayna Tortorici"	2015
135	"Scott Anderson"	2015
136	"Anna Sale"	2015
137	"Rachel Syme"	2015
138	"Alexis Okeowo"	2015
139	"Andy Greenwald"	2015
140	"George Quraishi"	2015
141	"Stephen J. Dubner"	2015
142	"Sarah Maslin Nir"	2015
143	"Masha Gessen"	2015
144	"Cheryl Strayed"	2015
145	"Ashlee Vance"	2015
146	"Rembert Browne"	2015
147	"James Verini"	2015
148	"Anna Holmes"	2015
149	"Ross Andersen"	2015
150	"Margaret Sullivan"	2015
151	"Ian Urbina"	2015
Special	"Bonus Episode: Noreen Malone"	2015
152	"Carol Loomis"	2015
153	"Tim Ferriss"	2015
154	"William Finnegan"	2015
155	"S.L. Price"	2015
156	"Renata Adler"	2015
157	"Margo Jefferson"	2015
158	"Peter Hessler"	2015
159	"Ira Glass"	2015
160	"Jessica Hopper"	2015
161	"Karina Longworth"	2015
162	"John Seabrook"	2015
163	"Matthew Shaer"	2015
164	"Lena Dunham"	2015
165	"Jazmine Hughes"	2015
166	"Ed Caesar"	2015
Special	"Previously on the Longform Podcast: #129 Rukmini Callimachi"	2015
167	"Kurt Andersen"	2015
168	"Ta-Nehisi Coates"	2015
169	"Chip Kidd at the Miami Book Fair"	2015
170	"Aleksandar Hemon at the Miami Book Fair"	2015
171	"Adrian Chen"	2015
172	"Kliph Nesteroff"	2015
173	"Doug McGray"	2015
174	"Venkatesh Rao"	2016
175	"Brooke Gladstone"	2016
176	"Grant Wahl"	2016
177	"Alex Perry"	2016
178	"Michael J. Mooney"	2016
179	"Heben Nigatu and Tracy Clayton"	2016
180	"Mishka Shubaly"	2016
181	"Wesley Yang"	2016
182	"Heather Havrilesky"	2016
183	"Jia Tolentino"	2016
184	"Daniel Alarcón"	2016
185	"Ben Smith"	2016
186	"Gabriel Snyder"	2016
187	"Elizabeth Gilbert"	2016
188	"Nate Silver"	2016
189	"Maciej Ceglowski"	2016
190	"Susie Cagle"	2016
Special	"Bonus Episode: Evan Ratliff"	2016
191	"Kelly McEvers"	2016
192	"Seymour Hersh"	2016
193	"Robin Marantz Henig"	2016
194	"Pablo Torre"	2016
195	"Leah Finnegan"	2016
196	"Jon Favreau"	2016
197	"Nikole Hannah-Jones"	2016
Special	"Father's Day Bonus: Louisa Thomas and Evan Thomas"	2016
198	"Frank Rich"	2016
Special	"Bonus Episode: Shane Bauer"	2016
199	"Kathryn Schulz"	2016
200	"Jack Hitt"	2016
201	"T. Christian Miller and Ken Armstrong"	2016
202	"David Remnick"	2016
203	"Ellis Jones"	2016
204	"Malcolm Gladwell"	2016
205	"Ezra Klein"	2016
206	"Gabriel Sherman"	2016
207	"McKay Coppins"	2016
208	"Rachel Monroe"	2016
209	"Sarah Schweitzer"	2016
210	"Ben Taub"	2016
211	"Naomi Zeichner"	2016
212	"Julia Turner"	2016
213	"A.J. Daulerio"	2016
214	"Luke Dittrich"	2016
215	"Krista Tippett"	2016
216	"Emily Witt"	2016
217	"Doreen St. Félix"	2016
218	"Wesley Morris"	2016
219	"Susan Casey"	2016
220	"Kyle Chayka"	2016
221	"Adam Moss"	2016
222	"Wesley Lowery"	2016
223	"Carl Zimmer"	2016
224	"Hua Hsu"	2016
225	"Ta-Nehisi Coates"	2016
226	"Terry Gross"	2017
227	"Jace Clayton"	2017
228	"Jeff Sharlet"	2017
229	"Alexey Kovalev"	2017
230	"Ezra Edelman"	2017
231	"Brooke Gladstone"	2017
232	"Ana Marie Cox"	2017
233	"Alexis C. Madrigal"	2017
234	"Matthew Cole"	2017
235	"Caity Weaver"	2017
236	"Al Baker"	2017
237	"Sheelah Kolhatkar"	2017
238	"Hrishikesh Hirway"	2017
239	"Brian Reed"	2017
240	"Alex Kotlowitz"	2017
241	"David Grann"	2017
242	"Sarah Menkedick"	2017
243	"Samin Nosrat"	2017
244	"Nick Bilton"	2017
245	"Rafe Bartholomew"	2017
246	"Jeffrey Gettleman"	2017
247	"Ariel Levy"	2017
248	"Erin Lee Carr"	2017
249	"John Grisham"	2017
250	"Patricia Lockwood"	2017
251	"Ginger Thompson"	2017
Special	"S-Town's Brian Reed"	2017
252	"Mark Bowden"	2017
253	"Steven Levy"	2017
254	"Maggie Haberman"	2017
255	"Matthew Klam"	2017
256	"David Gessner"	2017
257	"Jay Caspian Kang"	2017
258	"Kate Fagan"	2017
259	"Ellen Barry"	2017
260	"Rachel Kaadzi Ghansah"	2017
261	"Hillary Clinton"	2017
262	"Alex Goldman of Reply All (Part 1)"	2017
262	"PJ Vogt of Reply All (Part 2)"	2017
263	"Jelani Cobb"	2017
264	"Vanessa Grigoriadis"	2017
265	"Michael Barbaro"	2017
266	"Patricia Bosworth"	2017
267	"Sarah Ellison"	2017
268	"Jim Nelson"	2017
269	"Jodi Kantor"	2017
270	"Tyler Cowen"	2017
271	"Kara Swisher"	2017
272	"Jason Leopold"	2017
273	"Zoe Chace"	2017
274	"Mara Shalhoup"	2017
275	"Tina Brown"	2017
Special	"Maggie Haberman, New York Times White House Correspondent"	2017
Special	"Ben Taub, New Yorker staff writer"	2018
276	"Azmat Khan"	2018
277	"Kiera Feldman"	2018
278	"Nathan Thornburgh"	2018
279	"Seth Wickersham"	2018
280	"Liliana Segura"	2018
281	"Michael Idov"	2018
282	"Jenna Wortham"	2018
283	"Sean Fennessey"	2018
284	"Joe Weisenthal"	2018
285	"Chana Joffe-Walt"	2018
286	"Nitasha Tiku"	2018
287	"Will Mackin"	2018
288	"Tom Bissell"	2018
289	"Craig Mod"	2018
290	"Michelle Dean"	2018
291	"Charlie Warzel"	2018
292	"Lauren Hilgers"	2018
293	"Adam Davidson"	2018
294	"Sheila Heti"	2018
295	"Deborah and James Fallows"	2018
296	"Leon Neyfakh"	2018
297	"Elif Batuman"	2018
298	"Reeves Wiedeman"	2018
299	"Helen Rosner"	2018
300	"May Jeong"	2018
Special	"Rachel Kaadzi Ghansah on 'A Most American Terrorist: The Making of Dylann Roof'"	2018
301	"Bryan Fogel"	2018
302	"Megan Greenwell"	2018
303	"Rukmini Callimachi"	2018
304	"Laura June"	2018
305	"Nathaniel Rich"	2018
306	"David Marchese"	2018
307	"Jeff Maysh"	2018
308	"Jon Caramanica"	2018
Special	"Elif Batuman, author of The Idiot and 'Japan's Rent-a-Family Industry'"	2018
309	"Jeanne Marie Laskas"	2018
310	"Eli Saslow"	2018
311	"Jerry Saltz"	2018
312	"Rebecca Traister"	2018
313	"Liana Finck"	2018
314	"Lisa Brennan-Jobs"	2018
315	"Elizabeth Kolbert"	2018
316	"Joe Hagan"	2018
317	"Paige Williams"	2018
318	"Beth Macy"	2018
319	"Madeleine Baran"	2018
320	"Irin Carmon"	2018
321	"Nicholas Schmidle"	2018
322	"Maria Streshinsky"	2018
Special	"Bonus: Dan Taberski"	2018
323	"Allison P. Davis"	2018
Special	"Samin Nosrat, host and author of Salt Fat Acid Heat"	2018
324	"Malcolm Gladwell"	2019
325	"Lizzie Johnson"	2019
326	"Doug Bock Clark"	2019
327	"Julie Snyder"	2019
328	"Tommy Tomlinson"	2019
329	"David Grann"	2019
330	"Thomas Morton"	2019
331	"Lydia Polgreen"	2019
332	"Christie Aschwanden"	2019
333	"Rosecrans Baldwin"	2019
334	"Patrick Radden Keefe"	2019
335	"Kiese Laymon"	2019
Special	"Evan Ratliff, author of The Mastermind"	2019
336	"Wesley Morris"	2019
337	"Casey Newton"	2019
338	"Hillary Frank"	2019
339	"Michael Lewis"	2019
340	"Linda Villarosa"	2019
341	"David Wallace-Wells"	2019
342	"Christine Kenneally"	2019
343	"Sloane Crosley"	2019
344	"Emily Bazelon"	2019
345	"Mark Adams"	2019
346	"Casey Cep"	2019
347	"Michael Pollan"	2019
348	"David Epstein"	2019
349	"Alex Mar"	2019
156	"Renata Adler"	2019
350	"Taffy Brodesser-Akner"	2019
351	"Josh Levin"	2019
352	"Jenny Odell"	2019
353	"Baxter Holmes"	2019
354	"Jia Tolentino"	2019
355	"Taylor Lorenz"	2019
356	"Jean-Xavier de Lestrade"	2019
357	"Michelle García"	2019
358	"Mike Isaac"	2019
359	"Paul Tough"	2019
360	"Ta-Nehisi Coates and Chris Jackson"	2019
361	"Ken Burns"	2019
362	"Andrew Marantz"	2019
363	"Radhika Jones"	2019
364	"Nicholas Quah"	2019
365	"Carvell Wallace"	2019
366	"Ashley Feinberg"	2019
367	"Errol Morris"	2019
368	"Leslie Jamison"	2019
369	"Lori Gottlieb"	2019
370	"James Verini"	2019
371	"Parul Sehgal"	2019
372	"Andy Greenberg"	2019
373	"Mina Kimes"	2019
Special	"Liana Finck, author of Excuse Me and Passing for Human"	2019
Special	"Jerry Saltz, New York art critic"	2020
374	"Cord Jefferson"	2020
375	"Katherine Eban"	2020
376	"Kevin Kelly"	2020
377	"Andrea Bernstein"	2020
378	"Ashley C. Ford"	2020
379	"Joshua Yaffa"	2020
380	"Ronan Farrow"	2020
381	"Hannah Dreier"	2020
382	"Mara Hvistendahl"	2020
383	"Jad Abumrad"	2020
384	"Jon Mooallem"	2020
385	"Charlie Warzel"	2020
386	"Ed Yong"	2020
387	"Eva Holland"	2020
388	"Naomi Klein"	2020
389	"Lulu Miller"	2020
390	"Bonnie Tsui"	2020
391	"Cheryl Strayed"	2020
392	"David Haskell"	2020
393	"Isaac Chotiner"	2020
394	"Philip Montgomery"	2020
395	"Wesley Lowery"	2020
396	"Kierna Mayo with Patrice Peck"	2020
397	"Jacqueline Charles with Patrice Peck"	2020
398	"Dean Baquet"	2020
399	"Tessie Castillo and George Wilkerson"	2020
400	"Maria Konnikova"	2020
401	"Aminatou Sow and Ann Friedman"	2020
402	"Raquel Willis with Patrice Peck"	2020
403	"Seyward Darby"	2020
404	"Jenny Kleeman"	2020
405	"Jason Parham"	2020
406	"Andrea Valdez"	2020
407	"Baynard Woods and Brandon Soderberg"	2020
408	"Ta-Nehisi Coates"	2020
409	"Claudia Rankine"	2020
410	"Jiayang Fan"	2020
411	"Elizabeth Weil"	2020
412	"Nicholson Baker"	2020
413	"Latria Graham"	2020
414	"Barton Gellman"	2020
415	"Latif Nasser"	2020
416	"Reeves Wiedeman"	2020
417	"Olivia Nuzzi"	2020
418	"Stephanie McCrummen"	2020
419	"Reggie Ugwu"	2020
420	"Melissa del Bosque"	2020
421	"Wright Thompson"	2020
422	"Nilay Patel"	2020
423	"Ed Yong"	2020
424	"Kenneth R. Rosen"	2021
425	"Stephanie Clifford"	2021
426	"Mirin Fader"	2021
427	"Luke Mogelson"	2021
428	"Katie Engelhart"	2021
429	"Vinson Cunningham"	2021
430	"Connie Walker"	2021
431	"Tejal Rao"	2021
432	"Jess Zimmerman"	2021
433	"Elon Green"	2021
434	"Jessica Lessin"	2021
Special	"Longform Podacst"	2021
435	"Albert Samaha"	2021
436	"Dana Goodyear"	2021
Special	"Polk Award Winners: Tristan Ahtone"	2021
Special	"Polk Award Winners: Ryan Mac and Craig Silverman"	2021
Special	"Polk Award Winners: Helen Branswell"	2021
Special	"Polk Award Winners: Roberto Ferdman"	2021
Special	"Polk Award Winners: Michael Grabell and Bernice Yeung"	2021
437	"Brooke Jarvis"	2021
438	"Anna Sale"	2021
439	"Adam McKay"	2021
440	"Donovan X. Ramsey"	2021
441	"Theo Padnos"	2021
442	"Rose Eveleth"	2021
443	"Katherine Eban"	2021
444	"Dan Rather"	2021
445	"Barrett Swanson"	2021
446	"Megha Rajagopalan"	2021
447	"Aaron Lammer"	2021
448	"Robert McKee"	2021
449	"Jessica Bruder"	2021
450	"Doree Shafrir"	2021
451	"Julie K. Brown"	2021
452	"Sheera Frenkel and Cecilia Kang"	2021
453	"Roger Bennett"	2021
454	"Kirby Dick and Amy Ziering"	2021
455	"Lawrence Wright"	2021
456	"Sarah A. Topol"	2021
457	"Hannah Giorgis"	2021
458	"Max Chafkin"	2021
459	"E. Alex Jung"	2021
460	"Mary Roach"	2021
461	"Jay Caspian Kang"	2021
462	"Ben Smith"	2021
463	"Mitchell S. Jackson"	2021
464	"Casey Johnston"	2021
465	"Ben Austen and Khalil Gibran Muhammad"	2021
466	"Anita Hill"	2021
467	"Kelefa Sanneh"	2021
468	"Emily Oster"	2021
469	"George Saunders"	2021
470	"Abe Streep"	2022
471	"Sarah Marshall"	2022
472	"Michael Schulman"	2022
473	"Khabat Abbas"	2022
474	"Chuck Klosterman"	2022
475	"Brian Reed and Hamza Syed"	2022
476	"Matthieu Aikins"	2022
477	"Tara Westover"	2022
478	"Laura Shin"	2022
479	"Heather Havrilesky"	2022
480	"Joshua Yaffa"	2022
481	"Hanif Abdurraqib"	2022
482	"Maya Shankar"	2022
483	"Chloé Cooper Jones"	2022
484	"Alzo Slade"	2022
485	"Jackie MacMullan"	2022
Special	"Polk Award Winners: Clarissa Ward"	2022
Special	"Polk Award Winners: Maria Abi-Habib"	2022
Special	"Polk Award Winners: Sarah Stillman"	2022
Special	"Polk Award Winners: Daniel Chang"	2022
Special	"Polk Award Winners: Azmat Khan"	2022
486	"Vauhini Vara"	2022
487	"Joe Bernstein"	2022
488	"Sam Knight"	2022
489	"Molly Lambert"	2022
490	"Matt Levine"	2022
491	"Lulu Garcia-Navarro"	2022
492	"Alexandra Lange"	2022
493	"Rebecca Traister"	2022
494	"Andrea Elliott"	2022
495	"Evan Ratliff"	2022
496	"Michael Pollan"	2022
497	"Sam Sanders"	2022
498	"Hannah Goldfield"	2022
499	"Yudhijit Bhattacharjee"	2022
500	"Caitlin Dickerson"	2022
501	"Nona Willis Aronowitz"	2022
502	"Graciela Mochkofsky"	2022
503	"Evan Osnos"	2022
504	"Pablo Torre"	2022
505	"Robert Samuels and Toluse Olorunnipa"	2022
506	"Sam Anderson"	2022
507	"Rachel Aviv"	2022
508	"Erika Hayasaki"	2022
509	"Andy Kroll"	2022
510	"Nancy Updike and Jenelle Pifer"	2022
511	"Taffy Brodesser-Akner"	2022
512	"Audie Cornish"	2022
513	"Bradley Hope and Tom Wright"	2022
514	"Ryan O'Hanlon"	2022
Special	"Grant Wahl (1973–2022)"	2022
515	"Clint Smith"	2022
516	"David Wolman"	2022
517	"Katy Vine"	2023
518	"Jonathan Goldstein"	2023
519	"Peggy Orenstein"	2023
520	"Delia Cai"	2023
521	"Jonah Weiner"	2023
522	"Abraham Josephine Riesman"	2023
523	"Willa Paskin"	2023
524	"Eric Lach"	2023
525	"Sam Fragoso"	2023
526	"Laurel Braitman"	2023
527	"Mary Childs"	2023
528	"Roxanna Asgarian"	2023
529	"Liz Hoffman"	2023
530	"Vann R. Newkirk II"	2023
531	"David Grann"	2023
Special	"Polk Award Winners: Theo Baker"	2023
Special	"Polk Award Winners: Lori Hinnant"	2023
Special	"Polk Award Winners: Tracy Wang and Nick Baker"	2023
Special	"Polk Award Winners: Lynsey Addario"	2023
Special	"Polk Award Winners: Terrence McCoy"	2023
532	"Kevin Kelly"	2023
533	"Hua Hsu"	2023
534	"Tracy Kidder"	2023
535	"Amy Chozick"	2023
536	"Lisa Belkin"	2023
537	"Brady Dale"	2023
538	"Brittany Luse"	2023
539	"Mitchell Prothero"	2023
540	"Heidi Blake"	2023
541	"Donovan X. Ramsey"	2023
542	"Peter Shamshiri"	2023
543	"Jeff Goodell"	2023
544	"Casey Newton and Kevin Roose"	2023
545	"Jennifer Senior"	2023
546	"Javier Zamora"	2023
547	"Jamie Loftus"	2023
548	"Susan Burton"	2023
549	"Reginald Dwayne Betts"	2023
550	"Zeke Faux"	2023
551	"Kashmir Hill"	2023
552	"Azam Ahmed"	2023
553	"Clare Malone"	2023
554	"Yepoka Yeebo"	2023
555	"Evan Hughes"	2023
556	"Jesse David Fox"	2023
557	"Adam Grant"	2023
558	"Mona Chalabi"	2023
559	"Craig Mod"	2023
560	"Mosi Secret"	2023
561	"Ian Coss"	2023
562	"Daisy Alioto"	2023
563	"Miles Johnson"	2024
564	"Rob Copeland"	2024
565	"Susan B. Glasser"	2024
566	"Patricia Evangelista"	2024
567	"Chris Ryan"	2024
568	"Zoë Schiffer"	2024
569	"Lauren Markham"	2024
570	"Sloane Crosley"	2024
571	"Tessa Hulls"	2024
572	"Derek Thompson"	2024
573	"Rozina Ali"	2024
574	"Zach Harris"	2024
575	"Megan Kimble"	2024
Special	"Polk Award Winners: Amel Guettatfi and Julia Steers"	2024
Special	"Polk Award Winners: Jesse Coburn"	2024
Special	"Polk Award Winners: Meribah Knight"	2024
Special	"Polk Award Winners: Brian Howey"	2024
Special	"Polk Award Winners: Jason Motlagh"	2024
576	"Lindsay Peoples"	2024
577	"PJ Vogt"	2024
578	"Lissa Soep"	2024
579	"Kelsey McKinney"	2024
580	"Rachel Khong"	2024
581	"Tavi Gevinson"	2024
582	"Joseph Cox"	2024
583	"Jay Caspian Kang"	2024
584	"Ta-Nehisi Coates"	2024
585	"John Jeremiah Sullivan"	2024

== Article recommendation service ==
Longform operated a longform article recommendation service from its founding until January 2022. Its referral sources included the dating website OkCupid, where people shared their love of the site. From 2014 to 2017, it maintained an app for readers to browse its picks.
