= International Reporting Project =

- Type: Non-profit organization
- Country: Washington D.C., United States
- Founded: 1998
- Key people: John Schidlovsky, Director; Glendora Meikle, Program Manager; Riker Pasterkiewicz, Communications Associate
- Affiliation: New America
- Official website: internationalreportingproject.org

The International Reporting Project, headquartered at New America, funds independent journalistic coverage of under-reported events around the world. The program was created in 1998 as one of the early examples of the non-profit journalism movement, seeking to bridge the gap left by much of the mainstream media's reduction of international news.

== History of the Project ==
The International Reporting Project (IRP) provides opportunities to journalists to go overseas to do international reporting on critical issues that are under covered in the U.S. news media. The program was created in 1998 by John Schidlovsky, a veteran journalist and former foreign correspondent for The Baltimore Sun in China and India. The program's early founding made it a pioneer in the “non-profit journalism” movement that seeks to fill the gap left by much of the mainstream media's reduction of international news. The IRP has provided opportunities to more than 600 journalists to travel to more than 110 countries to produce prize-winning stories. The program is funded entirely by private, non-partisan foundations and individuals who believe in the importance of in-depth international coverage in the U.S. media.

Since August 2016 the IRP has been based at New America, a nonpartisan research institution with offices in Washington, D.C., New York, and California. New America is committed to renewing American politics, prosperity, and purpose in the Digital Age. The organization's generate big ideas, bridge the gap between technology and policy, and curate broad public conversation. Due to our move our fellows have access to some of the world's leading specialists in international issues and a new platform for growing and expanding our mission. From its founding in 1998 through July 2016, the program was based at the Paul H. Nitze School of Advanced International Studies (SAIS) of Johns Hopkins University.

== IRP Fellowships ==
=== Individual Projects ===
The core program since 1998 has been the individual reporting grants, or fellowships, that IRP awards to professional journalists. In a highly competitive process, journalists submit project proposals to the IRP for grants that enable them to spend an average of five weeks overseas reporting on important international issues. These stories appear in leading media outlets around the world. IRP Fellows have also been awarded grants to cover major global conferences, such as the 2016 global summit on HIV/AIDS in Durban, South Africa and the 2016 climate change conference in Marrakech, Morocco.

There have been 285 IRP Fellows in the program since 1998. These journalists have reported from more than 110 countries around the world. Among the journalists who have received IRP Fellowships are Steve Inskeep, co-host of NPR's “Morning Edition”; Raney Aronson-Rath, executive producer at PBS Frontline; Joby Warrick, national security reporter at The Washington Post; Kathryn Schulz, staff writer for The New Yorker, Anne Barnard, Beirut bureau chief at The New York Times, and many others.

=== Group Travel ===
A second activity the IRP sponsors is the 12-day intensive reporting group trips for journalists. IRP has organized 28 reporting trips to 26 different countries. Participants on these trips have included senior producers, editors and reporters, as well as new media practitioners. Many of these trips have been thematic, focusing on topics such as health, environment, human rights or other issues.

There have been 311 “IRP Trip Participants” in the program since 2000. The IRP has taken groups to Indonesia (twice), Brazil (twice), South Africa (twice), Lebanon/Syria, India (twice), Egypt, Nigeria, Korea (including the North), Uganda, Zambia, Kazakhstan, Turkey, Kenya (twice), Tanzania, Peru, China, Liberia, Rwanda, Ethiopia, Ecuador, Lesotho, Saudi Arabia, Mozambique and Nepal. Among those who have traveled on IRP trips are senior editors such as Jill Abramson, former executive editor at The New York Times; Davan Maharaj, executive editor at the Los Angeles Times; Douglas Jehl, foreign editor at The Washington Post and many others. Recent participants have included writer/reporters such as Irin Carmon, Zoe Fox, Sarika Bansal, Tom Murphy, Jill Filipovic, Azmat Khan, Lauren Bohn, Azad Essa and many others.

=== Journalist-in-Residence ===
Occasionally, the IRP also offers the "Journalist-in-Residence" fellowship, enabling senior journalists, in many cases, veteran foreign correspondents, to spend anywhere from one to eight months in Washington, D.C. to work on a book or other project about international affairs. Along with this program, occasional conferences, panel discussions and public events on international news coverage are present.
