= Barrett Swanson =

American short story writer

Barrett Swanson in Patmos, Greece September 2026

Essayist Barrett Swanson at the Milwaukee Repertory Theater, September 2026

Barrett Swanson is an American longform magazine writer and essayist. He is the author of the critically acclaimed essay collection Lost in Summerland, which contains several essays previously published in magazines including Harper's Magazine, The New Yorker, The New York Times Magazine, The Atavist, and The Paris Review. Swanson’s magazine work stands out for its blend of immersive reporting, cultural critique, and personal memoir. As a contributing editor at Harper’s Magazine, his major essays explore subcultures, shifting American identities, and the search for meaning amid societal collapse.

== Early life and education ==
Barrett Swanson was born in January 1985 and grew up in Brookfield, Wisconsin, attending a Catholic high school in Waukesha, Wisconsin. He graduated summa cum laude from Loyola University Chicago, earning bachelor's degrees in Political Science and English, and received his MFA in creative writing from University of Wisconsin-Madison.

== Career ==
Swanson is a contributing editor at Harper's Magazine and associate professor at the University of Wisconsin-Whitewater, where he teaches courses in creative writing.

His longform magazine pieces served as the foundation for his essay collection, Lost in Summerland. In a rave review from The New York Times Book Review, Albert Samaha called his debut "impressive" and praised Swanson as "as a candid and empathetic narrator, guiding us with restrained cynicism and enticing prose as he interrogates the stories we tell ourselves to paper over truths we'd rather not face.” Writing in Ploughshares, the critic Brady Brickner-Wood suggested, "Beyond their exhaustive intelligence, a large part of what makes Lost in Summerland so monstrously enjoyable is that they are what James Wood would call 'novelistic essays'...Lost in Summerland waltzes between the global and the local, critical theory and lived experience, philosophical musings and acutely personal insights, all in an effort to diagnose the 'wearisome existence' of contemporary American life...It's difficult to express Lost in Summerland's excellence without using tired descriptors like 'urgent' and 'necessary,' but, alas, the book feels both urgent and necessary."

Swanson specializes in immersive reporting from the fringes of American subcultures. His pieces explore utopian experiments, spiritual communities, and niche gatherings—such as the "Ugly People Festival," TikTok influencers, toxic masculinity retreats, sober communities at the Bonnaroo music festival—in order to understand how contemporary Americans seek meaning and belonging.

His viral Harper’s essay, "The Anxiety of Influencers," explores the industry of Los Angeles TikTok mansions. Swanson lived with young content creators in a mansion in Beverly Hills to examine how fame, commodification, and influencing affected youth identity, increased anxiety, and turned selfhood into a product. Vox described it as "easily the best and most depressing piece of journalism about famous TikTokers... a 'Slouching Towards Bethlehem' for influencers." The Los Angeles Times similarly described it as having "something of Joan Didion’s wry bemusement about the vacuity of modern celebrity."

=== Lost In Summerland ===
Lost in Summerland is an essay collection “[chronicling] Swanson’s search for enlightenment amid the ruins of old paradigms,” using a “blend [of] memoir, immersion reporting, and cultural criticism”. Swanson explores topics like the fragility of masculinity, mental illness, and America following the wake of 9/11 and the Iraq War. The title essay, “Lost in Summerland,” explores the spiritual aftermath of his brother's recovery from serious brain injury, taking the author and his brother to New England and a convention for spiritualists at Lily Dale.

=== Equipment for Living ===
His new book, Equipment for Living: Notes on Selfhood after the End of the World, is forthcoming from Atria/Simon & Schuster.

== Awards ==
A five-time nominee for the National Magazine Award, Barrett Swanson was the winner of the 2015 Pushcart Prize for his short story, “Annie Radcliffe, You Are Loved”. He was also named the 2016-2017 Halls Emerging Artist Fellow at the Wisconsin Institute for Creative Writing. His work has been included in two editions of The Best American Travel Writing (2018 and 2020) and featured as notable in The Best American Short Stories (2019), The Best American Nonrequired Reading (2014), The Best American Sports Writing (2017), and The Best American Essays (2014, 2015, 2017, 2019, 2020, and 2021). His Harper’s essay, “High & Dry: Sobriety and Transcendence at Bonnaroo” was the winner of the 2025 Kay N. Levin Award for Short Nonfiction.

== Bibliography ==
Books

- Equipment for Living: Notes on Selfhood After the End of the World. Forthcoming. Atria/Simon & Schuster.
- Lost in Summerland: Essays. May 2021. Counterpoint Press.

Essays

Harper’s Magazine

- ”Regarding The Pain of Uggos”, on the World’s Ugly People Festival, 2026.
- ”High & Dry”, on the sober communities at the Bonnaroo Music Festival, 2025.
- “The Anxiety of Influencers,” on Tiktok mansions, 2021.
- ”This is Not a Test,” on Disaster City, 2020.
- ”Men at Work,” on men’s retreats, 2019.

The New York Times Magazine

- ”Chat”, for the On Language column, 2026.
- ”On Balding,” for the Letter of Recommendation column, 2019.
- ”On Pistol Pete’s Homework Basketball,” for the Letter of Recommendation column, 2017.

The New Yorker

- ”The Two Faces of Suicide,” on the literature of self-termination, 2019.

The Paris Review

- “For Whom Is the Waterpark Fun?” on amusement parks, 2019.
- ”The American Rodeo,” on rural entertainment, 2019.
- ”Political Fictions,” on fan convention for The West Wing, 2018.

The Believer

- ”Midwestern Gothic,” on personal tragedy and conspiracy theories, 2018.

The Atavist

- ”Lost in Summerland,” on his psychic brother, 2019. Selected for Best American Traveling Writing.

The Point

- ”Starving,” on Kafka and social media, 2016.
- ”Party Politics,” on protest movements, 2016.
- ”Perilous Aesthetics,” on photojournalism, 2013.

New England Review

- ”Notes from Last Man,” in Florida, Trumpism and despair, 2019. Selected for Best American Traveling Writing.

Orion

- ”The Soldier and the Soil,” on antiwar veterans, 2017.
