= Paul Le Roux =

Criminal cartel boss (born 1972)

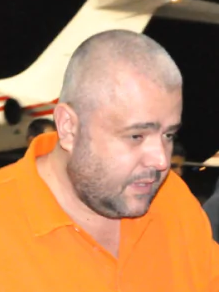
- Le Roux during his extradition in 2012
- Born: Paul Calder Le Roux; 24 December 1972 (age 53); Bulawayo, Matabeleland, Rhodesia
- Other names: John Bernard Bowlins; Bernard John Bowlins; Paul Berberes (or Leraux); Johan William Smit
- Citizenship: Zimbabwe; South Africa; Australia (from 1995)
- Spouses: Michelle (m. 1994; div. 1999); Lilian Cheung Yuen Pui (m. 1999; div. 2013)
- Children: 11 known
- Criminal charges: Murder, money laundering, drug trafficking, arms trafficking, organized crime, fraud
- Capture status: Arrested

Paul Calder Le Roux (born 24 December 1972) is a South African former programmer, former criminal cartel boss, and informant to the US Drug Enforcement Administration (DEA).

In 1999, he created E4M, a free and open-source disk encryption software program for Microsoft Windows, and is sometimes credited for open-source TrueCrypt, which is based on E4M's code, though he denies involvement with TrueCrypt.

Le Roux was arrested on 26 September 2012 for conspiracy to import narcotics into the United States, and agreed to cooperate with authorities in exchange for a lesser sentence and immunity to any crimes he might admit to later. He subsequently admitted to arranging or participating in seven murders, carried out as part of an extensive illegal business empire.

Le Roux was sentenced to 25 years in prison in June 2020.

== Early life ==
Le Roux was born on 24 December 1972, at Lady Rodwell Maternity Home in Bulawayo, in what was then the republic of Rhodesia (present-day Zimbabwe), and given up for adoption. His birth certificate gives his first name as "unknown" and makes no mention of his father. His biological mother's identity has not been disclosed; one source claims she was a poor teenager, while another states that his maternal grandmother was married to a US senator.

Aged two months, he was adopted by a couple living in the asbestos-mining town of Mashava and given his future name, Paul Calder Le Roux. Although several family members became aware over the years, his parents never informed him of his adoption, and Le Roux only discovered the truth in 2002. Le Roux also had a younger sister.

Following political events in 1980 that ended the Rhodesian Bush War and Robert Mugabe assuming power and ending white minority rule, Le Roux's family relocated to South Africa in 1984 for better schooling opportunities. They found a new home in the mining town of Krugersdorp, where Le Roux's father started a company managing coal-mining operations, soon bringing wealth to the family.

Shortly after, Le Roux was given his first computer in exchange for washing his father's car. As a teenager, he was described as tall, trim and handsome, though not very social and not interested in sports. He was obsessed with the video game Wing Commander, which he played on his gaming console connected to the family TV.

At around 15 or 16 years old, Le Roux was arrested for selling pornography following a police search of the family home. The family was able to keep the incident out of the public eye. Following his arrest, Le Roux became even more reclusive. An excellent student, he refused to learn Afrikaans—mandatory in South African schools — calling it a "dead language" and eventually dropping out of school at age 16. He enrolled in a local programming course, in which he excelled, completing the one-year course in eight weeks.

Upon returning from a family holiday trip to the US, 18-year-old Le Roux decided to leave South Africa, and departed to the UK eight months later. He found work as a programmer, and, in 1994, met his future wife, Michelle. After six months in the US, he followed Michelle to Australia in 1995. The couple married and Le Roux acquired Australian citizenship. They lived in Perth and Sydney. Reports are contradictory regarding children of the marriage – some sources mention a son, while others claim Le Roux's first child (a son) was with his second wife.

Le Roux has revealed little about his early life, and most of it was uncovered by journalist Evan Ratliff, relying mainly on an initially unnamed source close to Le Roux. He would later name Le Roux's cousin and former employee Mathew Smith as a source.

== Internet activity and encryption software ==
Various Usenet newsgroup postings made by Le Roux are known from the second half of the 1990s. Some of them are highly technical encryption discussions, while others can be summarized as trolling. Le Roux would frequently post angry, sarcastic and offensive messages, including harsh verbal attacks against Australia as well as racist comments. On various occasions, he would later express his amusement at the reactions of other users.

In 1995, Le Roux appears as the owner of a business, World Away Pty.

Around 1997–1998, Le Roux began to develop E4M (Encryption for the Masses), which was first released on 18 December 1998. The product is capable of encrypting entire disks, and optionally of plausible deniability (denying the existence of an encrypted volume). Le Roux claimed the software had been written "from scratch". The software was released free of charge and with source code. In the "Politics" section of the E4M website, Le Roux published a kind of manifesto stating that governments are increasingly relying on electronic data gathering. Citing projects such as Echelon, linked to the five nation states which would become known as the "Five Eyes" more than a decade later, he stated that encryption is the only way to preserve civil liberties.

With no income from his previous two years of labour, Le Roux was struggling financially. He was divorced from his first wife in Brisbane in 1999. Sources close to Le Roux describe the divorce as "violent", while another states the couple parted ways amicably.

Le Roux relocated to Hong Kong, then to Rotterdam, where he married a Dutch citizen named Lilian Cheung Yuen Pui. The couple had a son soon after.

To monetize E4M, he launched SW Professionals in 2000. Based in South Africa, the company offered offshore programming, including E4M customization. According to its website, it had 5 to 6 employees. Le Roux himself was reportedly rarely seen in South Africa, and was still in a precarious financial situation.

In 2001, Le Roux was approached by Wilfried Hafner, a client with whom he had corresponded for several years about E4M. Hafner offered him a position in his newly founded company SecurStar. Le Roux was to build the engine for its upcoming DriveCrypt product, based on E4M and another product, Scramdisk (whose inventor, Shaun Hollingworth, had also joined SecurStar, where he still worked as of mid-2019). Both Hafner and Hollingworth describe him as a gifted programmer who would contribute innovative ideas. He was dismissed in 2002 upon Hafner discovering that Le Roux continued to work on E4M, incorporating some of the work he had done for SecurStar. Nonetheless, Hafner and Le Roux reconciled personally and stayed in touch for some time.

Around the same time, Le Roux was working on a gaming engine for an online casino he intended to launch in Canada and Romania. Hafner would later describe Le Roux as "not a marketer" and that he "didn't see how he could bring in the gamers to play." In 2001, Le Roux appears listed as a director of a company named SSD Software. SW Professionals went out of business in October 2002 and Le Roux solicited contract work with a Usenet post.

=== TrueCrypt release and controversy ===
In February 2004, the first version of TrueCrypt was released by anonymous developers who called themselves "the TrueCrypt Team", built on E4M code. As its developers remained anonymous, some of Le Roux's former SecurStar colleagues, including Hafner, suspected Le Roux of being involved but could not find any corroborating evidence. The actual authors remain unknown as of 2026.

According to Matthew Green, a computer science professor at the Johns Hopkins Information Security Institute and leader of the TrueCrypt audit in 2014, TrueCrypt "was written by anonymous folks; it could have been Paul Le Roux writing under an assumed name, or it could have been someone completely different."

Hafner sent a cease-and-desist letter to an email address associated with the TrueCrypt developers. The TrueCrypt Team immediately stopped development and distribution of TrueCrypt, which they announced on Usenet. Team member David Tesařík stated that Le Roux informed the team that there was a legal dispute between himself and SecurStar, and that he had received legal advice not to comment on the case. Because of this, he was unable to confirm or deny the legitimacy of TrueCrypt, keeping its development in limbo. A new version was released in June, but with a different digital signature and the developers now being referred to as "the TrueCrypt Foundation". The project received funding, the source of which is equally unclear.

Responding to the TrueCrypt controversy, Le Roux sent his last Usenet post, in which he wrote "the pure speculation here (often stated as fact) is damaging and in some cases libelous." This appears to be the last online appearance he made using his real name.

Le Roux's involvement with TrueCrypt still remains unclear as of 2016. Le Roux himself has denied developing TrueCrypt in a court hearing in March 2016, in which he also confirmed he had written E4M. On the other hand, he reportedly ordered employees around 2007 to encrypt their hard disks with E4M and later with TrueCrypt.

== RX Limited ==
In 2003, Le Roux sent out a request to various Usenet groups, in which he solicited business contacts in the US:

We are European based private investors looking for a U.S citizen or green card holder to help us setup a new company based out of Florida, we will do all the paper work we need your help to comply with U.S law. But we know nothing in this world is free, so we will pay you up to $500 to help us. Please only genuine people. No time wasters.

Around 2004, at the advice of a lawyer in Costa Rica, Le Roux abandoned his online gambling activities and launched several web sites and call centres for the online sale of prescription drugs.

To place an order on these sites, customers would fill out questionnaires about their medical history and symptoms, order their chosen medication and pay by credit card. The questionnaires would get forwarded to doctors in the US, who would in turn write prescriptions for the drugs ordered, despite never having examined the patient in person. The prescription, along with the customer's order, would go to a pharmacy in the US, which would then ship the drug. Both the doctor and the pharmacy would receive a commission for the order. Prosecution in the case alleged in 2014 that "some of [RX Limited's] customers' hands are cold and 6 feet under right now."

RX Limited advertised its services through spam email. As messages pointing to one particular web site would quickly get blocked by spam filters, RX Limited would open up new sites. Initially the new domains were purchased individually from domain sellers such as GoDaddy, until RX Limited set up its own domain seller, ABSystems, allowing RX Limited to spawn new domains on a much larger scale. By 2012, LegitScript estimated that more than half the rogue online pharmacies in the world were registered through ABSystems.

The business operated in a legal gray area, but many employees and pharmacists had the impression that it was acting legally. Each order came with a prescription, and the system would keep track of customers' orders and block unusually large orders arriving within a short period of time. The system also seemed to adapt to apparent changes in regulation. Pharmacists were shown the licenses of the doctors writing the prescriptions and recruiters would stress the fact that the business was not selling controlled substances. In at least one instance, a pharmacist was given the contact details of a former DEA agent, who confirmed there would be no legal issues in shipping any of the medications offered by RX Limited.

The business was highly profitable. The US Internal Revenue Service calculated that RX Limited owed more than $1.5m in tax from 2005 alone. The debt is still outstanding.

=== Medications ===
Medications offered through RX Limited's web sites included:

- Fioricet (active ingredients: butalbital, acetaminophen and caffeine), a treatment for tension headaches and migraine
- Propecia (active ingredient: finasteride), a treatment for hair loss
- Soma (active ingredient: carisoprodol), a muscle relaxant to treat back problems
- Ultram (active ingredient: tramadol), a synthetic opioid painkiller
- Viagra (active ingredient: sildenafil), a treatment for erectile dysfunction

=== Call centres ===
Call centres were initially set up in Israel, checking orders and handling customer complaints. Employees in these call centres were told to adopt American-sounding names in customer contacts and tell customers they were located in Utah.

One such operation was Beit Oridan (later renamed to IBS Systems and finally to SCSM). The Jerusalem-based business was registered in 2005 by two Israeli brothers, with Le Roux acting as a silent partner. One of the brothers left the company in July 2006, the other in the fall of 2007, with no official explanation, and Le Roux oversaw the operation directly, with the two Israeli managers now reporting directly to him.

In the autumn of 2008, the two managers of the Jerusalem call centre were tasked with overseeing the opening of a new call centre in Tel Aviv. The new call centre opened in 2009 under the name CSWW (Customer Service World-Wide) and took over customer service, while Jerusalem-based SCSM would handle accounting and company infrastructure.

As RX Limited continued to grow, Le Roux began opening call centres in the Philippines, staffing manager positions with Israelis recruited by the SCSM managers. Le Roux paid Israeli-level salaries despite the cost of living being much lower in Manila, making his job offers seem an attractive opportunity. He provided the Israeli expats with apartments in various neighbourhoods of Manila but would frequently relocate them, stating he needed their apartment. By 2010, he had at least ten call centres with more than 1,000 employees.

In 2011, the US government restricted the distribution of Soma, banning its distribution across state borders and requiring pharmacies to obtain special DEA approval to dispense it. As Soma was among RX Limited's best-selling drugs, the company lost around one third of its business and was forced to downsize. Le Roux decided to close the Tel Aviv call centre and downsize the Jerusalem office. He began smuggling pharmaceuticals from Mexico into the US to fulfill orders.

=== Mock execution of a call centre manager ===
Realizing the rapid expansion of RX Limited and its constant search of new pharmacies in late 2008, two managers of the Israeli call centre started casually discussing the possibility of opening their own pharmacy in the US. They believed they could open a flourishing business while at the same time helping Le Roux's operations.

A few months after this casual conversation, one of the two managers was dispatched to the Philippines for what he believed to be a business meeting with three partners he did not know, one of whom was Dave Smith. He was thrown off a yacht and shot at while Smith accused him of stealing from Le Roux. Upon learning that he had merely discussed plans which would have been beneficial for both sides, Smith pulled him back on board. Le Roux later warned him that he would be killed if he were even suspected of stealing, and made similar threats if he were to leave.

== Farmland leases in Zimbabwe ==
Between September 2007 and 2008, Le Roux spent $12 million to secure 99-year leases on farmland the Zimbabwean government had seized from white farmers, and to lobby Mugabe with the help of Ari Ben-Menashe, lobbyist and former Israeli intelligence officer. His plan was to bring back white farmers to the land. It is alleged that he "wanted to see Zimbabwe back under the control of the whites". In his only known media statement, Le Roux told the Washington, DC, newspaper The Hill: "We want recognition that injustice was done in the past and that the land-reform program corrects that." Rumors existed that the farmland leases were only part of a bigger plan going as far as removing Mugabe from power. Le Roux eventually abandoned his plans around 2008.

== Logging ==
In 2007, Le Roux also took up logging operations in the Democratic Republic of the Congo. Also around 2007–2008, Le Roux hired Ben-Menashe to lobby the government of Vanuatu to allow the logging of kauri trees. The deal was arranged, but Le Roux disappeared. Between late 2008 and early 2009 Le Roux withdrew from all of his logging operations.

== Expansion into illegal business ==
In 2007, Le Roux relocated his family to Manila, into a house in the upscale gated community of Dasmariñas, and oversaw his business from there.

Realizing the commercial success of his online pharmacy business, a legal gray area at the time, Le Roux decided to diversify and expand into illegal activities around 2007. These included logging, precious metals mining, gold smuggling, land deals, drug shipments, arms trafficking and money laundering. He operated in a number of places, including Manila, Hong Kong, Colombia, Africa and Brazil. Numerous Israelis were recruited through RX Limited during that time, invited to the Philippines and assigned to operations outside RX Limited. These included a logging business in the Democratic Republic of the Congo, procuring gold directly from African mines or guarding houses owned by Le Roux in Hong Kong. Many of Le Roux's organizations were staffed with former soldiers.

Hong Kong was the financial hub of Le Roux's organization. Proceeds from Le Roux's various operations would be invested in gold bars, diamonds and silver grain and stored in Hong Kong in one of several houses and apartments which Le Roux owned for that purpose. A number of Israelis, many of them former elite soldiers, had been recruited to guard them. Ultimately, the goods would be transferred to Le Roux's base in Manila by boat or private plane. Payments to RX Limited's call centres and suppliers would be wired from Hong Kong. Several of the shell companies registered by or on behalf of Le Roux were based in Hong Kong.

Le Roux kept his operations highly compartmentalized. Few people in his organization were aware of the full extent of its activities. In one instance, when Le Roux was already acting as an informant, he dispatched one team to Mauritius for a series of meetings, while another was to provide surveillance. Neither team knew of the other, and it was not until the surveillance team returned from its mission that its head, Hunter, recognized the members of the other team in the surveillance photos.

Beginning in or before 2008, Le Roux started covering his tracks. He operated through several shell companies in various countries and used multiple false identities, some backed with false papers. Among these were a legitimate Congolese diplomatic passport, issued in August 2008 (with his name listed as Solotshi Calder Le Roux, Paul, and his birth date as 1982-12-24), and a Zimbabwean passport, issued in 2009, under the name Bernard John Bowlins, born 1964-06-20. In a 2008 online chat transcript he discussed staging his own death and disappearing into a new identity, and getting a birth certificate under a new name. Around the same time, he is first reported to have used violence to intimidate opponents: in 2008, he ordered the house of his cousin and employee Mathew Smith firebombed over a financial dispute.

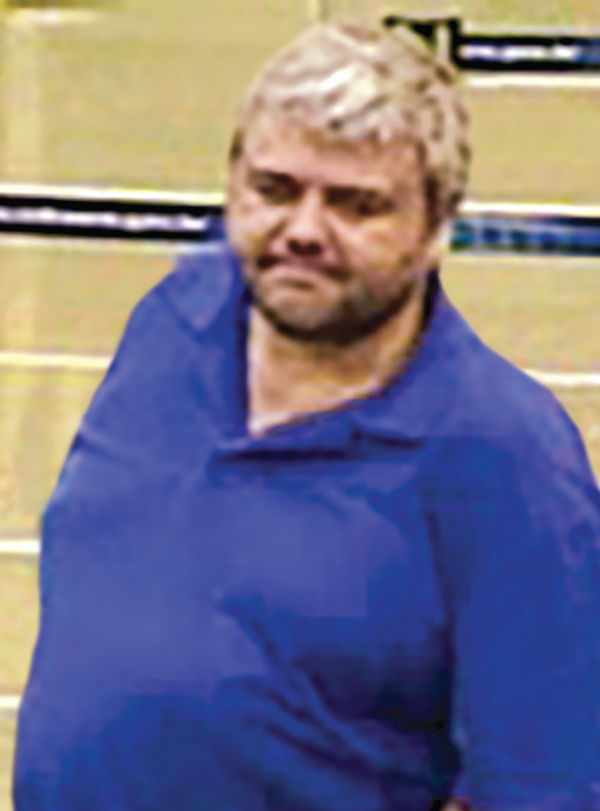
CCTV photo of Le Roux entering Brazil at Galeão Airport in Rio de Janeiro

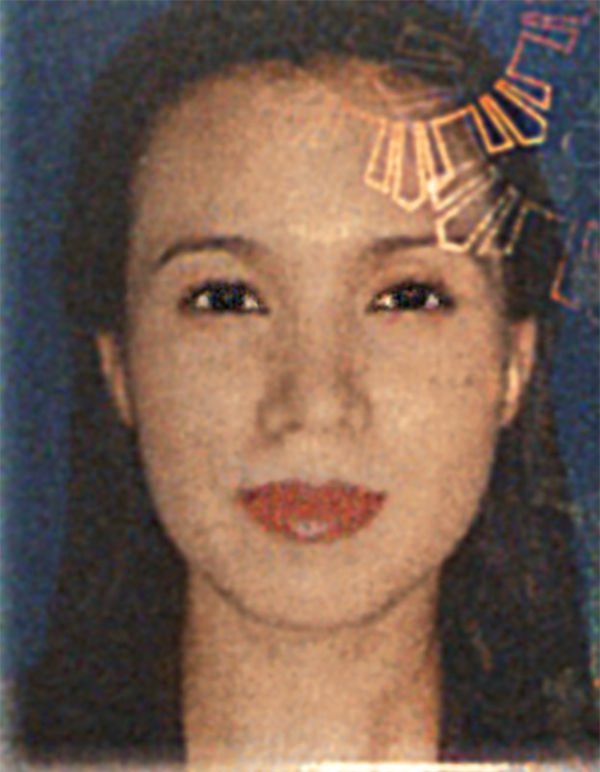
Passport photo of Cindy Cayanan, who was Le Roux's accountant and girlfriend

Around 2011, Le Roux began to disappear for long periods of time, with none of his employees knowing his whereabouts. As US authorities were closing in on him, Le Roux took up temporary residence in Rio de Janeiro and planned his move there. Accounts on the timeframe vary: depending on the source, he first arrived in Rio sometime between 2010 (two years before his arrival in May 2012) and November 2011. Le Roux had a Brazilian lover in Rio, with whom he had a son, thus being protected from extradition under Brazilian law.

Le Roux arrived in Rio de Janeiro on 19 May 2012, with girlfriend Cindy Cayanan and their daughter, posing as tourists. Three Israeli associates would oversee his operations during his absence.

=== Notable figures ===
==== Dave Smith ====
Smith was a British native and allegedly carried an American passport. He had done security work in Iraq and then for a risk-management company in the Philippines. Le Roux hired Smith in or before 2008, making him his de facto deputy and head of security. Smith gave Le Roux access to a network of former security contractors who had previously served in Iraq or Afghanistan.

Hit man Ronald Baricuatro, apprehended in February 2012 and connected to the assassination of Mike Lontoc in September 2011, stated he was hired by Smith to conduct surveillance on journalist Mar T. Supnad in preparation of a planned hit. Both hits were in connection with the seizure of the Captain Ufuk in 2009.

In 2011, Le Roux began suspecting Smith of skimming off drugs and gold from shipments, and had him assassinated. According to one source, Smith was kidnapped outside a bar while drunk, and placed in a shallow grave. Then he was shot and buried. Another source claims that Smith was thrown off a boat and shot in a manner similar to the Israeli call centre manager. Le Roux himself supposedly fired at least some of the shots. In a court hearing in March 2016, Le Roux admitted his involvement. The judge did not allow questions on how Smith was murdered.

==== Joseph Hunter ====
Joseph Hunter (born ca. 1965), who would later become Le Roux's top hit man, was hired between 2007 and 2009. Raised in Owensboro, Kentucky, Hunter had enlisted in the army in 1983 and joined the Rangers in 1985. Eight months later, in 1986, Hunter was discharged for medical reasons, after the death of a friend in his unit during a training exercise left him traumatized. He spent the rest of his military career as a drill sergeant and sniper instructor. Over the course of 18 years he was posted in Germany, Panama and Puerto Rico. He was retired in mid-2004, holding the rank of sergeant first class. He received multiple honors for his service in the Army.

After retiring from the Army, Hunter returned to Owensboro. He planned to join the police, but never did. Sources are inconclusive about the reasons: Hunter either passed the New York City Police exam but decided the city was too expensive, or he was rejected due to his age, despite being in excellent physical condition.

In 2005 Hunter became an inmate counselor at the Green River Correctional Complex. Dissatisfied with his job, he quit it after 15 months in 2006, and subsequently signed up with a private security firm. He was dispatched to Iraq, taking fingerprints and DNA swabs from company employees. Two years later he joined another firm, protecting US embassy staff and investigating suicide bombings.

According to his family, Hunter had become increasingly short-tempered during his time in the army. Hunter himself stated that his time in Iraq exacerbated these traits. He became moody, irritable and aggressive. Later, while in custody following his arrest in 2013, he was diagnosed with PTSD.

Between 2007 and 2009, Hunter was introduced to Le Roux by a colleague. He was initially tasked with buying and selling gold in Mali. Le Roux offered Hunter a job as his bodyguard in 2009. According to Hunter's own accounts, he began to realize in mid-2009 that he was involved in illegal operations and, due to his name being used in various operations, suspected he was being set up to be "sacrificed" to law enforcement, but claimed to fear for his life if he were to quit.

In 2010, Dave Smith dismissed Hunter, considering him "too hot headed". Hunter lived in the US for a year and returned following Smith's assassination in 2011, taking Smith's former position. His exit from and return to the organization would later prompt the court to reject his duress defense. Hunter carried out or oversaw multiple murders for Le Roux, which the organization referred to as "bonus jobs". He apparently recruited hit men through contacts from his days as a defense contractor. Many of the hit men Hunter recruited for Le Roux were, like him, former soldiers who had had trouble settling into civilian life.

On 25 September 2013, Hunter was apprehended in Le Roux's house in Phuket, extradited to the US and flown to New York. On 31 May 2016, he was sentenced to 20 years in prison for conspiracy to murder a federal agent and import narcotics, into which he had been lured by Le Roux as part of a sting operation. In 2019, he received an additional life sentence for the murder of Catherine Lee.

=== Iran arms deal ===
A 2014 court document revealed that Le Roux was also charged with exporting "goods, technology and services" to the Iranian government between 2009 and 2012. The goods are believed to be a missile guidance system.

=== Somali arms and drug deals ===
Through his company Southern Ace, Le Roux supplied AK-47 assault rifles and light machine guns to Somali militias starting in April 2009, in violation of an existing arms embargo.

Rumors exist that Le Roux was planning to build a militia to invade the Seychelles. His enforcer Hunter is known to have bragged about such plans, but the head of the UN investigative team concerned with Le Roux's activities in Somalia dismissed it. According to him, Le Roux intended to set up a security firm specialized in protecting commercial ships from pirate attacks.

In March 2010, Le Roux had plans to import a large quantity of heavy weapons to Somalia by air, though the delivery never took place. In mid-2010 Le Roux discovered he was paying militiamen almost twice the market rate, and a dispute with his partner in the operation, known only by his alias "Ottavio", erupted.

Following the dispute with "Ottavio", most of Southern Ace's international staff left Somalia by early 2011, with only two remaining. "Ottavio" took over local operations, the two foreigners appear to have handled administrative tasks. One of them, a Zimbabwean national named Jirat Taeko, is reported to have been killed in January 2011 following an argument over financial issues. Altogether, Le Roux's organisation spent an estimated $3m on the operation, including almost $1m in militia salaries and over $150,000 worth in arms and ammunition.

"Ottavio" was alleged by the UN to also be involved in experiments to cultivate narcotic plants including opium, coca and cannabis near the Ethiopian border. The involvement of Philippine, Zimbabwean and South African nationals in the operation was implied. Some sources claim Le Roux had plans to start a cocaine plantation in Somalia.

=== The Captain Ufuk ===
According to his own accounts, Bruce Jones was hired by Dave Smith in 2008 to purchase a ship in Turkey and sail it from there to the Philippines via Indonesia, with Manila-based company La Plata Trading (one of Le Roux's companies) paying expenses and supplying the crew. Jones completed the purchase of the Captain Ufuk and sailed to Jakarta, Indonesia. There he picked up a shipment of guns from a company called PT Pindad, bound for Manila-based Red White and Blue Arms Inc., and continued his journey to the Philippines.

Jones had been supplied with an end-user certificate, according to which the guns were meant for Mali's Ministry of Internal Security and Civil Protection, and the pickup was guarded by Indonesian police and soldiers, thus Jones later claimed he believed the shipment to be legitimate. Journalist Evan Ratliff, citing a leaked document, claims the Indonesian Ministry of Defense had approved the sale.

In reality, however, the guns were intended to be delivered to La Plata Trading and subsequently sold to rebels in the south of the country, including Islamist terrorist group Abu Sayyaf.

==== Seizure ====
As Jones approached his final destination, he was ordered by his employers to delay bringing the ship into port. The ship remained anchored for several days near the coast of Mariveles, Bataan, three hours west of Manila. On 19 August 2008, Jones told his boss he wanted to get on land, as his wife was pregnant and due to deliver. His employers sent out a yacht, the Mou Man Tai, with Smith, replacement captain Lawrence Burne and a rubber speedboat on board. Sixteen boxes of guns were transferred to the yacht, accompanied by Hunter, who had been on board the Captain Ufuk. Jones returned to Subic Bay in the smaller boat.

During the day, a local fisherman had become suspicious of the ship and alerted authorities. The next day Philippine Coast Guard and customs officials motored out to the Captain Ufuk and discovered 20 unmarked wooden crates, for which the captain was unable to produce a cargo manifest. Officials discovered the guns in the crates, among them Pindad SS1 assault rifles.

Replacement captain Burne was arrested but jumped bail. Later, in December 2014, he was sentenced in absentia to eight years of imprisonment for tax evasion related to the shipment. He remains at large as of early 2016.

The crew, all of them Georgian citizens, were detained and indicted in 2010. They were eventually deported to Georgia.

==== Assassination of Bruce Jones ====
The press implicated Jones in its coverage of the case. Jones went into hiding and in early September surrendered to the authorities. He agreed to cooperate, on the condition of being placed on a witness protection program. He received numerous death threats and observed individuals apparently surveilling him. He was never given the witness protection his lawyer requested. One year after the incident, he started to become confident that his former employers were no longer after him. On 21 September 2010, he and his wife and son met a friend, known to him as John Nash, and his wife for lunch in a mall in Angeles City, north of Manila. On his way back from the mall, Jones was shot fatally by two assassins on a motorcycle. His wife was struck by one bullet but survived. The assassination took place next to a shooting range, which provided ideal cover.

Le Roux has never been formally accused in connection with Jones's death, although he allegedly admitted to ordering the hit in a private conversation. The case was archived between 2012 and 2013, and remains unsolved as of October 2015, with no suspect ever arrested over it.

==== Raid of Herbert Tan Tiu's home ====
In early October 2010 the Philippine National Police searched the home of Herbert Tan Tiu and discovered several Indonesian-made assault rifles, suspected to come from the Captain Ufuk. Tan Tiu disappeared later and is still missing.

==== Assassination of Michael Lontoc ====
Lontoc, general manager of Red White and Blue Arms Inc., was on his way back from a shooting competition in a Manila suburb in September 2011. As he slowed down at a busy intersection, he received a mobile phone call. At the same time, four men surrounded his car and fired into it. Lontoc died on the scene. His widow later told reporters he had become involved with an arms smuggling cartel and tried to get out.

A year after the assassination of Lontoc, a man named Jimmy Pianiar confessed to killing him. He stated he and three other men had been paid to carry out the murder and made at least five attempts to carry it out. The identity of the person behind the killings was not disclosed, he was referred to only as the "mastermind".

==== Arrest of Ronald Baricuatro ====
Baricuatro was arrested in the Makati neighborhood of Dasmariñas while trying to redeem a motorcycle previously confiscated from an alleged financier of a gun smuggling syndicate, British national Cristopher Leruef. Found in his possessions were a wig, camera, various false ID cards and a "hit list". Mar Supnad, an investigative journalist who had reported on the Captain Ufuk case, was at the top of the list.

Being wanted for previous charges of arson and a murder he committed over a family dispute, he was detained. Witnesses later claimed to have seen Baricuatro conducting surveillance on Lontoc's car hours prior to his assassination.

Baricuatro later stated that he was hired by Dave Smith to conduct surveillance on Supnad but somebody else would have carried out the actual killing.

==== Disappearance of Joe Zuñiga ====
Lawyer Joe Frank Zuñiga had represented Jones in the Captain Ufuk case. On 20 June 2012, he left his home to meet with a client. He was last seen at 11:45 in the Subic Bay area in the company of Timothy Desmond, CEO of the Ocean Adventure water park, and John Nash, its head of security. Around the same time, a witness reported a man being dragged into a van near Zuñiga's car. A call between Zuñiga's cell phone and a family member appears to have taken place at 2 pm. His car was discovered on the afternoon of the following day. Zuñiga has since been missing and police presume him dead. The case was archived between 2012 and 2014, without any suspects ever being arrested over it.

==== John Nash ====
Nash ran a security firm in the Subic Bay area. A close friend of both Bruce Jones and Joe Zuñiga, he was the last to see both men alive. As the National Bureau of Investigation started investigating him in connection with Zuñiga's case, they discovered he was using the identity of a deceased person and arrested him on 2 May 2014. He refused to disclose his identity and, despite inquiries to the US, UK, Australia and South Africa, no state can give any clue to his citizenship or identity, nor can any of his acquaintances. He remains in custody in the Philippines as of November 2015, thus far only accused of an immigration violation. His identity, citizenship, possible connection to Le Roux or role in the cases of Jones and Zuñiga, remain unclear.

==== Aftermath ====
All open cases related to the Captain Ufuk were archived between 2012 and 2014. Paul Le Roux has never been formally accused in any of them. Journalist Evan Ratliff, citing sources in law enforcement and Le Roux's organization, implies that he avoided charges through bribery and intimidation.

=== The JeReVe ===
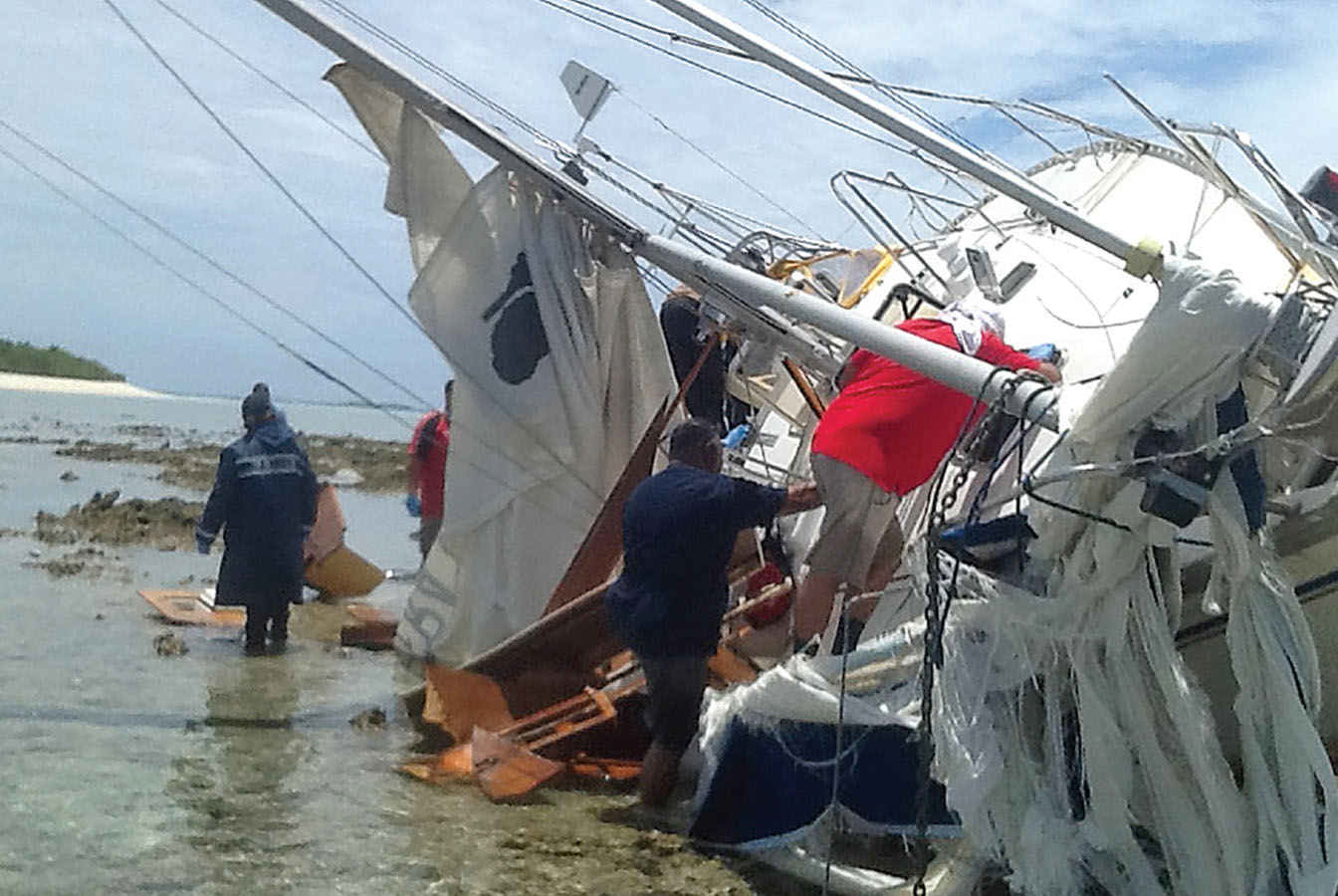
Wreck of the JeReVe yacht owned by Le Roux, where a corpse belonging to a Slovak national was found

Following his relocation to Rio de Janeiro, Le Roux started planning two drug shipments from Ecuador via yacht. One of the two yachts to be used for the shipment, the JeReVe (from French je rêve "I dream"), arrived in Ecuador in August 2012.

The JeReVe would travel to Australia, the other yacht to the Philippines, each carrying approximately 200 kg of cocaine. DEA agents managed to place a tracking device on the JeReVe and follow her movements. She briefly anchored off the coast of Peru, then began her crossing. The tracking device failed 5,200 nautical miles (6,000 miles; 9,700 kilometres) into the journey. Its last reported position dated to late September, near the Cook Islands.

The boat headed for the Philippines completed its journey but the JeReVe failed to arrive at her destination. On 7 November, she was found washed up on a reef off the shore of Luatafito Island, an uninhabited atoll in the northern part of Tonga, 9 nautical miles (10 miles; 16 kilometres) north of the main island. The yacht had apparently run into a storm off the coast and capsized. A corpse, believed to be second mate Milan Rindzák (35), a Slovak citizen, was found inside. Several passports, money in various European and American currencies and several hundred packets of cocaine, the latter having a street value of $120 million, were also found. There was no trace of the captain of the boat. An autopsy failed to establish the cause of death, which had occurred several days, possibly weeks, earlier.

Tongan police tried to locate relatives of Rindzák in Slovakia, but Rindzák's parents claimed that the body was not their son's. Slovak media speculated that the body could be Maroš Deák, but this remains unconfirmed. Slovak police refused to comment on the speculations, citing ongoing investigations. The body remained unclaimed and was eventually buried in January 2013 at a local cemetery.

=== Assassination of Noimie Edillor ===
Part-time real estate broker Noimie Edillor was married to a Filipino customs officer (because of this, some sources incorrectly refer to her as a customs agent) and allegedly worked for La Plata Trading. She allegedly accepted a bribe to help smuggle goods through customs, but did not keep her part of the deal. Hunter hired assassins who put her under surveillance at home, thus discovering she worked as a real estate agent. They posed as potential customers looking for rental property, selecting the one where they believed the murder would be easiest to carry out. They then asked to see that property again and shot her at the door on 23 June 2011.

Her husband and sister refused to cooperate with authorities or answer questions from journalists. Following his arrest, Le Roux admitted to ordering the murder in court, but due to a proffer agreement he signed following his arrest, he cannot be prosecuted in the US. However, the Philippines' National Bureau of Investigation announced that they will seek Le Roux's extradition and charge him with the crimes he committed under their jurisdiction.

=== Killing of Catherine Lee ===
Around 2011, Le Roux enlisted real estate broker Catherine Lee from Las Piñas, Metro Manila, to purchase vacation property in Batangas for him and paid her an advance of 50 million Philippine pesos (about $1.15 million) despite professional ethics prohibiting brokers from accepting and receiving payments for themselves but only to property owners, and that full payment only to be made to the owners upon successful title transfer. Evidently, the amount involved is for the value of the property as title processing and other fees only costs a fraction of the amount, and Lee had been unaware that her client is a criminal mastermind. Lee claimed to have outsourced title transfer processing with the advance to an unnamed associate to fix the deal; however, Lee later claimed that associate disappeared with the money entrusted to her and had apparently misled and defrauded Le Roux with the money, leading to Le Roux feeling victimized.

In early February 2012, Lee received an e-mail from two men, who had been hired by Hunter. They introduced themselves as Bill Maxwell and Tony, claiming to be Canadians living in Manila and seeking to invest in real estate. She met the two men and, over the course of three days, showed them various properties. She was last seen alive at 4:30 pm of 12 February, their third day, by the owners of a property they had visited and three other brokers. She departed in a car with her clients. Her body was found at 6:30 am the next day in a field in Taytay, Rizal, an industrial city an hour east of Manila. She had been shot four times, a gunshot wound under each eye, which the National Bureau of Investigation (NBI) suspected to be a signature killing. Dissatisfied with the way the killing was carried out, Hunter dismissed the two hit men.

The NBI drew parallels to the case of Noimie Edillor, who was killed in a similar way, unsolved as her family had refused to cooperate with the authorities. The NBI believes the associate was also assassinated, although no body was ever found.

Following their arrests in 2012 and 2013, neither Le Roux nor Hunter have been formally accused of the case, despite Le Roux having admitted to ordering the murder in court. (Le Roux signed a proffer agreement, which would give him immunity against prosecution in the US but leaves open the possibility of him being extradited to the Philippines and facing charges there). Hunter and the two hit men were eventually charged and sentenced to life in prison in 2019.

== Investigation, arrest and prosecution ==
US authorities began investigations against RX Limited in September 2007.

In 2009, US authorities came across Le Roux's name and a phone number believed to be his, and started monitoring it.

Following the Captain Ufuk, the DEA immediately suspected Le Roux's involvement in the case, as the websites of the two companies involved (La Plata Trading and Red White and Blue Arms) were registered through ABSystems, the domain registrar Le Roux set up for RX Limited.

US authorities also became suspicious because of numerous calls to Somalia made from the phone number they had previously linked to Le Roux, but his activities were only revealed in a 2011 UN report.

In March 2012 the DEA searched a pharmacy in Oshkosh, Wisconsin. Its owner had signed up in the summer of 2006 after a recruiter had assured him about the legitimacy of the business, and over the years had evolved into the main supplier for RX Limited. The owner immediately admitted his involvement and agreed to cooperate with the authorities. He maintained his contacts with the company to help the DEA identify key figures in the operation.

US and Brazilian authorities managed to surveil Le Roux in Brazil starting in early 2012. Among others, they recorded phone calls between him and his wife Lilian Cheung Yuen Pui. In these, he warned her not to invest into real estate in the Netherlands, as it would be too easy to seize if he were arrested, pointing out that his business was illegal.

=== Arrests in Hong Kong ===
Through the wiretaps set up in Rio, DEA agents learned about a large shipment of fertilizer passing through Hong Kong. They informed authorities in Hong Kong, who searched the warehouse, finding 20 tonnes (22 short tons) of ammonium nitrate fertilizer, enough to create an explosive ten times the size of the one used in the Oklahoma City bombing. The office of a Le Roux-owned company in Hong Kong and the apartment of its manager were searched on 30 April, providing clues to further parts of the organization.

Several employees of Le Roux's, most of them Israelis, were arrested over the following days as they tried to liquidate his assets, mostly gold bars, and attempted to move money out of the country.

Among those arrested was Maroš Deák, operating under the name Ivan Vaclavik, wanted in the EU in connection with the murder of his brother Roman in 1999. He later jumped bail and escaped to Rio de Janeiro. A Filipino citizen was also arrested and jumped bail later.

Le Roux's wife, Lilian Cheung Yuen Pui, was arrested upon entering Hong Kong on 10 May but appears to have been released without charges.

The fertilizer was later revealed to be of a quality unsuitable for explosives, indicating Le Roux's partner in the deal betrayed him. No one has ever been charged in relation to the explosives.

The Israelis were later sentenced in Hong Kong, receiving sentences from four to over five years in prison on charges of possession of "property known or reasonably believed to represent the proceeds of an indictable offence". At least two of them were released early and returned to Israel.

=== Arrest of Le Roux ===
Authorities learned through the Rio wiretaps that Le Roux was making arrangements for two drug shipments via yacht from Ecuador. This was when US authorities first learned of Le Roux's involvement with drugs. Previously wanted only for unlawful sale of prescription drugs, he now became a target of the DEA's narco-terrorism investigators.

An associate of Le Roux approached him about a representative of a Colombian cartel that wanted to build a methamphetamine operation in Liberia, and flew to Rio de Janeiro for a meeting on 11 May 2012. Le Roux would supply precursor chemicals, a facility and a chemist. In return, he would be offered 100 kg of cocaine for each 100 kg of methamphetamine produced, after letting the Colombians test a sample. Le Roux would meet the cartel representative in Liberia to finalize the deal.

Unknown to Le Roux, the Colombian cartel representatives were DEA agents and the operation was an attempt to apprehend him. As he could not be extradited under Brazilian law, being the father of a Brazilian child, the DEA had chosen to lure him into Liberia, which would allow them to bring him to the US without an extradition proceeding. The associate had collaborated with the DEA and been carefully instructed to make Le Roux aware of the fact that the methamphetamine was to be sold in New York, providing the foundation for accusing Le Roux in the US.

Le Roux flew to Monrovia, Liberia, on 25 September to meet the representative of the Colombian cartel. The day after his arrival he was arrested by Liberian police. He tried to offer a bribe but the officers rejected it and handed him over to DEA agents, who took him to the US. During the flight back to the US, Le Roux agreed to cooperate with authorities. Upon arrival he was assigned an attorney and placed in secret custody in New York City. He was charged with conspiracy to import narcotics into the US and violation of the Food, Drug, and Cosmetic Act.

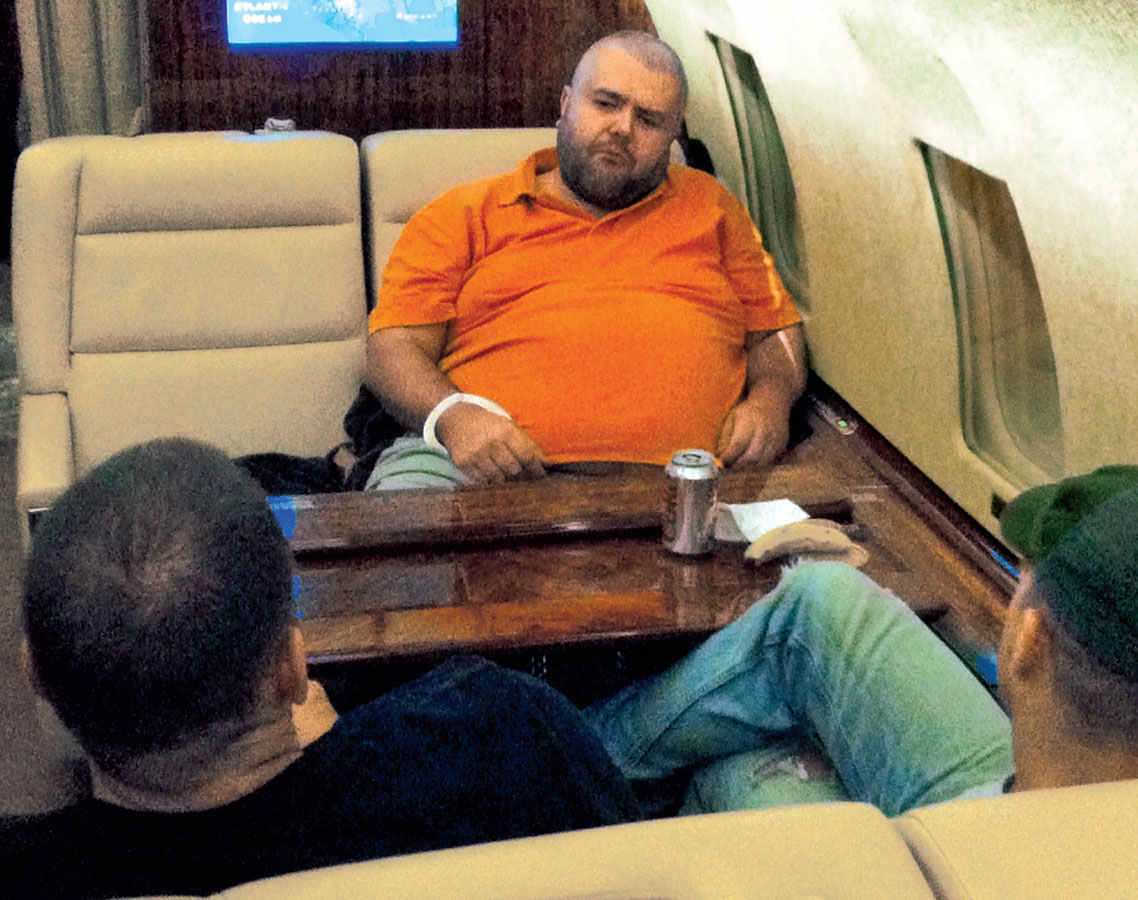
Le Roux under arrest en route to New York during his extradition

The day after his arrival, Le Roux signed a proffer agreement, agreeing to plead guilty to these two charges in exchange for immunity against prosecution for any other crimes he might admit to. Immediately after, he admitted to arranging or participating in seven murders for which he thus could not be prosecuted. Le Roux may thus have evaded an impending death sentence, converting it to a prison sentence of 25 years according to Folha de São Paulo, "around 12 years" by his own account. Le Roux's arrest, whereabouts and cooperation were kept confidential and all papers related to the case were sealed. Authorities attempted to give the impression that Le Roux was still at large in Brazil.

Le Roux modified his own email service, fast-free-email.com, through which all his personal mail passed, to preserve copies of his messages (the system had previously been set up to periodically destroy them). He continued to direct his former associates until at least mid-2014, leading them into stings set up by DEA agents. His cooperation has resulted in the arrest of at least 11 people. Another 7 were arrested by the DEA without his direct involvement.

=== Sting operation against Le Roux associates ===
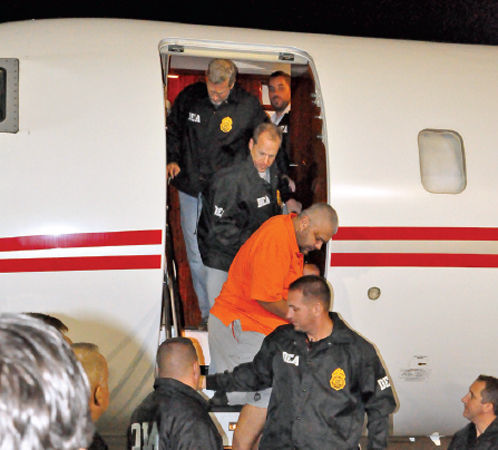
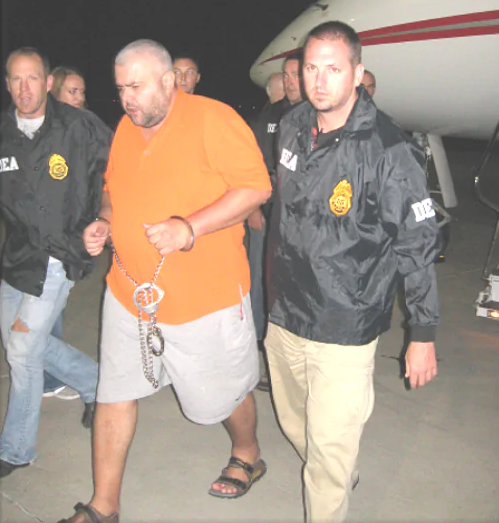
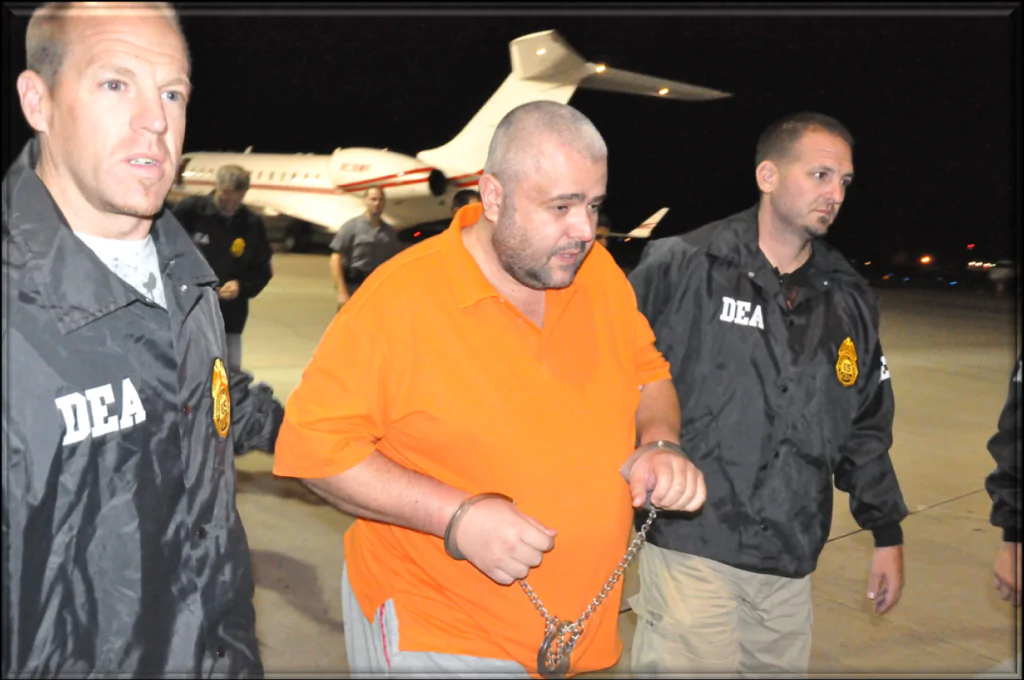
Le Roux being escorted by DEA agents during his extradition to the United States

Starting in late 2012, Le Roux ordered his associates Scott Stammers and Allan Kelly Reyes Peralta to provide methamphetamine from Ye Tiong Tan Lim, who had worked with Le Roux before. Peralta and Lim met the fake Colombian cartel representatives in January. The Colombians asked to see the labs, which, according to Lim, were located in North Korea. Lim declined the request as the presence of foreigners would have raised suspicions. Lim provided samples of meth in February, sending it to Philip Shackels, another Le Roux associate. Shackels and Stammers forwarded it to Monrovia, as requested by their clients. The samples tested at 96% and 98%.

Around the same time, Hunter was directed by Le Roux to assemble a team of hit men for the fake Colombian cartel. Hunter recruited three military veterans, two Germans (Michael Filter and Dennis Gögel) and one Pole (Slawomir Soborski). He arranged a meeting with them and the "clients" in a house belonging to Le Roux in Phuket. The DEA agents recorded the conversations between all of them. In the recordings, Hunter was heard boasting of having carried out two murders in the Philippines, as well as the mock execution of the call centre manager in 2009. He claimed to have assassinated nine people in one year.

The team was dispatched to their first task, determining whether Thai police were watching a shipment of drugs from Koh Samui.

In April 2014, Stammers and Shackels met with the Colombians and a prospective arms buyer in Mauritius. A second meeting was with Stammers, Shackels, the Colombians and two Serbians from whom they sought to obtain between 700 and 1,000 kg of cocaine to make up for the loss of the JeReVe. Hunter's three new hires provided security.

In mid-May, Stammers and Shackels again met with the Colombians about logistics of the methamphetamine shipment. Due to the political situation, Lim claimed, he could not ship any methamphetamine from North Korea but had one ton stockpiled in the Philippines, from where it would be shipped to Thailand and on to Liberia. Adrian Valkovic, sergeant-at-arms for the Outlaws Motorcycle Club in Bangkok, would provide security and logistics in Thailand with eight armed club members.

Timothy Vamvakias, already a member of Le Roux's organization, was added to Hunter's team of hit men in May. The team received another task: providing counter-surveillance for a plane in Bahamas due to deliver 200 kg of cocaine to the US.

In late May, Le Roux notified Hunter of an alleged informant in the organization and a DEA agent, ordering the assassination of both and offering a total of $800,000 in reward. The hit would be carried out in Liberia. The Colombians insisted that Soborski and Filter be involved in the operation, together with Vamvakias. Hunter met with his hit men and the Colombians in August in Le Roux's house in Phuket. The assassinations in Liberia would be carried out by Gögel and Vamvakias. In the meantime, Soborski and Filter would do reconnaissance in preparation for meeting about a weapons deal in Estonia.

On 25 September, Hunter was apprehended in Le Roux's house in Phuket, extradited to the US and flown to New York. Gögel and Vamvakias landed in Liberia later the same day to carry out the supposed hit. They were arrested by Liberian police upon arrival, transferred into DEA custody and flown to New York.

Soborski and Filter were arrested in Estonia. Both men were transported to a former Soviet prison. Soborski was severely injured in the operation and would later require abdominal surgery. Both were extradited to New York City on drug charges related to the Bahamas cocaine shipment for which they had provided surveillance.

Lim, Peralta, Stammers, Shackels and Valkovic met in Thailand to discuss logistics of the shipment with the Colombians. All five were arrested by officers of the Narcotics Suppression Bureau. They were extradited to New York City on charges of conspiring to import methamphetamine to the United States. Sources disagree on the date of the arrest: one source states that the Stammers group was arrested on 19 and 20 November (Valkovic being apprehended one day earlier than the others), another states that the arrests took place on the same day as the other arrests, 25 September, but were not reported to the media for two months. No official connection was made between the arrests of the two groups.

Hunter was later connected to the 2012 murder of Catherine Lee, for which he received an additional life sentence in 2019.

=== Trial of Le Roux ===
Le Roux pleaded guilty to being involved with RX Limited in January 2014. In December 2014, he pleaded guilty to trafficking methamphetamine into the US, selling technology to Iran, ordering or participating in seven murders, as well as fraud and bribery. In March 2016, it was revealed that US authorities had taken unspecified steps to protect Le Roux's family.

On 12 June 2020, Le Roux was sentenced to 25 years in prison. According to the presiding judge, Ronnie Abrams, "the scope and severity of Mr. Le Roux's criminal conduct is nothing short of breathtaking. I have before me a man who has engaged in conduct in keeping with the villain in a James Bond movie." However, she also added that the sentence reflected Le Roux's cooperation and the danger he faced.

Upon his release, Le Roux is expected to be deported to the Philippines to stand trial for the murders committed in the Philippines, as well as in relation to an arms shipment intercepted by the government in 2009.

=== Trial of Hunter and four hit men ===
The charges against Hunter, Gögel and Vamvakias included conspiracy to murder a federal agent and import narcotics. Filter and Soborski were indicted only on drug-related charges.

After Hunter's connection with Le Roux became publicly known in December 2014, his defence lawyer argued in January 2015 that Hunter acted out of fear of Le Roux. The court dismissed the motion. Hunter pleaded guilty in late January. All of his co-defendants followed over the course of 2015.

Hunter faced between 10 years and life in prison, with federal guidelines recommending between 24 and 30 years. His defence attorney asked for the minimum of 10 years, arguing Hunter is suffering from PTSD resulting from his time in the military and as a security contractor. On 31 May 2016, Hunter was sentenced to 20 years in prison. Co-defendants Gögel and Vamvakias also received 20-year sentences. In 2019, Hunter received an additional life sentence for the murder of Catherine Lee.

=== Trial of RX Limited key figures ===
In October/November 2013, eleven individuals linked to RX Limited were indicted in Minnesota. These included five RX Limited managers, a pharmacist who had supplied RX Limited and helped it set up its credit card processing in the US, as well as a physician who had issued prescriptions to patients he had never examined in person.

Le Roux lured two of the call centre managers to Romania in early 2014, in one case under the pretense of arranging for the transfer of money still owed to laid-off employees. Both were arrested by local police and extradited to the US. One of them skipped bail and presumably returned to Israel. The other was acquitted in Minnesota federal court in March 2017.

Le Roux made his first public court appearance testifying in the case in March 2016, despite his lawyers arguing that media coverage of the proceedings would put his family in danger and filing several motions to prevent a public hearing. A fake arrest report, dated 29 February 2016, was produced, apparently to conceal the circumstances of his arrest.

=== Arrest of Catherine Lee's suspected killers ===
The DEA's investigations into Lee's murder eventually led them to two men in Roxboro, North Carolina. After five witnesses in the Philippines identified them on photographs, testifying to have seen Lee in their company in the days before the murder, Adam Samia and Carl David Stillwell were arrested in their hometown and transferred to New York to be prosecuted with Joseph Hunter. They were reportedly paid $70,000 for the assassination. Both men pleaded not guilty.

Court documents revealed in early March 2016 that photos were found on Stillwell's cell phone, dated the day of Lee's murder and "appear[ing] to depict, among other things, a white van similar to the one in which (according to witness accounts) Lee was murdered, and a wounded human head."

Samia, Stillwell and Hunter received life sentences for the murder of Catherine Lee in 2019.

=== Media coverage ===
Le Roux's arrest was initially kept secret. The arrests of his associates were reported in the media but initially not connected to each other or to Le Roux. A first report of Le Roux's arrest surfaced in December 2013 in a Brazilian newspaper, but still did not mention a connection with the other arrests. The article was in Portuguese and did not spread widely. It would take another year, until December 2014, before The New York Times reported about Hunter's arrest, revealing that it was facilitated by Le Roux's cooperation with authorities. Still, Le Roux's case file, and large portions of those of the other defendants, remained sealed. Le Roux was the subject of Gimlet Media's Reply All podcast episode No. 136. In 2019, Evan Ratliff, who wrote a series of articles about Le Roux for The Atavist Magazine, published The Mastermind, a 446-page account of Le Roux's ventures. Also in 2019, investigative journalist Elaine Shannon published Hunting Le Roux, a book covering the DEA's efforts to capture Le Roux.

== Identities used ==
Paul Le Roux operated under numerous pseudonyms:

- Paul Solotshi Calder Le Roux, backed with a Congolese diplomatic passport
- John Bernard Bowlins (or Bernard John Bowlins) confirmed in court statement and backed with a Zimbabwean passport
- Johan aka John Paul Leroux (or Leraux)
- Johan William Smit, confirmed in court statement
- Benny, confirmed in Evan Ratliff's original investigative account

== Satoshi Nakamoto candidate ==
In a Wired magazine article published in 2019, Ratliff opined that it is possible that Le Roux could be Satoshi Nakamoto, the creator of Bitcoin, following mounting evidence. However, he admitted that, while the possibility could not be ruled out, there was not enough direct evidence to substantiate it.

In a book written by Evan Ratliff about Le Roux he admitted that a "former employee of Le Roux's, now in prison" suggested Le Roux had been the inventor of Bitcoin. The arrest of Le Roux, and the last posts by Satoshi Nakamoto to the original Bitcoin repository, occurred around the same time.

On 13 December 2022, Martin Shkreli alleged that a message signed by a Bitcoin wallet belonging to Hal Finney, who received the first ever Bitcoin transfer from Satoshi in a 12 January 2009 transaction, revealed Le Roux as being the sender. This claim was countered by Bitcoin developers such as Pieter Wuille, as this type of message signing functionality did not exist while Hal Finney was alive, so the message must have been written by someone else in possession of the late Finney's private keys.

== Personal life ==
=== Adoption ===
Le Roux's parents never told him about his adoption, despite various family members learning of it over the years. Only in 2002, on a trip to Zimbabwe to retrieve a copy of his birth certificate, did Le Roux's aunt and uncle reveal the truth to him. An unnamed relative recalls this discovery sent Le Roux into a deep personal crisis. Most of all, he is reported to have been upset about "the 'unknown' part" (which could refer to his first name being listed as "unknown", the fact that he never knew his biological mother, the fact that his birth certificate does not state who his biological father is, or all of these).

=== Family ===
Le Roux met his first wife, an Australian citizen, in London in 1994, and married her in 1995. The couple divorced in Brisbane in 1999. Sources close to Le Roux describe the divorce as "violent", while another states the couple parted ways amicably. It is unclear whether the couple had any children, some sources mention a son while others claim Le Roux's first child (a son) was with his second wife.

Between 2000 and 2001, Le Roux married a Dutch citizen named Lilian Cheung Yuen Pui. The couple had a son soon after. She appears to have been involved in his business, managing some of his assets, until Le Roux's arrest.

During his stays in Rio de Janeiro, Le Roux began an affair with a local citizen. He fathered a son with her, preventing Brazil from extraditing him. The timeframe of the relationship and birth of the child is unclear.

=== Character ===
Reports about Le Roux's personal image vary: while one former associate describes him as "not a soft, gentle person", another claims he was extraordinarily friendly to newly hired employees, often buying gifts for people. According to him, this way in which Le Roux presented himself made him seem more legitimate, and many of his staff joined his organization believing they were doing legitimate work. The highly compartmentalized nature of Le Roux's operations helped this, as few, if any, employees were aware of the full extent of the activities Le Roux was involved in. As rumors of Le Roux's expansion into organized crime and ordered killings started surfacing in 2009, many employees stayed out of fear he might have them killed or otherwise harm them, should they try to leave.

Evan Ratliff attributes Le Roux's criminal inclination to his youth in politically unstable southern Africa in the 1970s and 1980s. While enjoying a comparatively sheltered childhood amid the civil war in Zimbabwe, the chaotic conditions of the time, in which smuggling or operating in legal gray areas were widely considered acceptable, may have influenced his notions of right and wrong, possibly explaining why at least initially Le Roux had no moral concerns about conducting illegal business. Investigative journalist Elaine Shannon believes he was consistently drawn to Africa, which he considered "a place where he could do whatever he wanted […] obey no rules, make his own rules, make his own life, make his own empire." Ratliff, while cautious about attributing neo-colonialist tendencies to Le Roux, stated that he did repeatedly express such ideas in conversations.

A former target on Le Roux's hit list describes him as highly inclined to exploit corruption, as "he believes everybody has a price."

Le Roux became increasingly indifferent to using violence. In one instance he reportedly asked in a casual manner whether somebody who owed him money had any children. On several occasions, he would intimidate people, threatening to have them killed if they were even suspected of betraying him. In 2008, he ordered the house of his cousin and employee Mathew Smith firebombed, following a financial dispute.

In the time leading up to his arrest, Le Roux was described as a megalomaniac whose appetite exceeded his caution on one hand, while on the other hand taking care of crucial details, such as fathering a child in Brazil in order to avoid extradition. DEA agents have stated that on the wiretaps, Le Roux gave the impression that "he felt like he was not going to get away forever."

Le Roux was known for his racist views, which he expressed in Usenet postings and towards his employees. He employed numerous Israelis in key positions, although one former call centre manager states this was mostly because he considered Israelis to be the "cheapest, honest, smartest labor that he could find" rather than fondness.
