= Lebogang Motsumi =

South African HIV activist and writer (born 1989)

Lebogang Brenda Motsumi (born around 1989) is a South African HIV activist and writer. She has been named a "Youth Hero" by the African Union, and she is a member of youth advisory boards at both the UNFPA and the African Union.

== Early life and career ==
Lebogang Motsumi was born in Parktown, a suburb of Johannesburg, South Africa. On August 15, 2009, she got to know that she had received an HIV infection from a man 10 years her senior, a musician of some fame who later died. After the infection, she got involved in HIV/AIDS activism. She started sharing her life story at the XXI International AIDS Conference, 2016, more specifically shedding light on what she described as the problem with sugar daddies, or 'blessers' locally, who infect young girls and women with HIV.

She works as an inspirational speaker and coach in South Africa, and aims to inspire other young women in the country to stay healthy, and to stay in schools. She runs a support group at a hospital, and promotes defiance and abstinence of peer pressure among young girls and boys. She also advocates for sex education, and gives talks and speeches about the disease to other young people. Due to her work, the African Union has honored her as a youth hero, and she is a member of youth advisory boards both at UNFPA and at the African Union. She is also an ambassador for Zazi, a South African campaign to strengthen girls and women.

She has written the biography I'm Still Here!
