= Jon Mooallem =

American journalist and author

Jon Mooallem is an American journalist and author. He has written about human interactions with animals. He wrote a book about a radio announcer who worked to help her city in Alaska after an earthquake.

== Career ==
=== Journalism ===
Mooallem is a contributing writer for The New York Times Magazine, where he often writes about the relationship between humans and animals. Mooallem is a contributor to American Public Radio's series This American Life. He is also writer-at-large for the live publication Pop-Up Magazine.

=== Books ===
Mooallem's book Wild Ones was published in 2013 by Penguin Press and was one of the New York Times Book Review’s 100 Notable Books of 2013. In spring 2020, Mooallem published This Is Chance!: The Shaking of An American City, The Voice That Held It Together, with Random House. Writer Elizabeth Gilbert said of the book, "Jon Mooallem is one of the most intelligent, compassionate, and curious authors writing today. I would go on any adventure that his mind embarks upon, knowing that I was being led by the ablest of guides."

== Personal life ==
Mooallem lives with his family on Bainbridge Island, near Seattle, Washington. His podcast The Walking Podcast chronicles Mooallem's perambulations on the island. It was named one of 2019's Best Podcasts by The A.V. Club and New York Magazine's Vulture.com.

== Cultural references ==
In 2013, alt-bluegrass band Black Prairie released "Wild Ones," an album based on Mooallem's book Wild Ones.

== Honors ==
- 2013 Wild Ones New York Times Notable Book
- 2013 Wild Ones The New Yorker Best Book of the Year
- 2013 Wild Ones NPR Science Friday Best Book of the Year
- 2013 Wild Ones Brainpickings Best Book of the Year
- 2013 Wild Ones Outside Magazine Best Book of the Year
- 2019 The Walking Podcast Podcast The A.V. Club Best Podcast of the Year
- 2019 The Walking Podcast Podcast Vulture.com Best Podcast of the Year

== Bibliography ==
- Mooallem, Jon (2013). American Hippopotamus. Atavist.
- Mooallem, Jon (2013). Wild Ones: A Sometimes Dismaying, Weirdly Reassuring Story About Looking at People Looking at Animals in America. Penguin Press.
- Mooallem, Jon (2020). This Is Chance!: The Shaking of An American City, The Voice That Held It Together. Random House.
- Mooallem, Jon (2022). Serious Face: Essays. Random House.
