= Jonathan Abrams =

Jonathan Abrams may refer to:

- Jonathan Abrams (businessman), Canadian engineer, entrepreneur, and investor
- Jonathan Abrams (writer), American television writer

== See also ==
- Jon Abrahams
- John Abrams
- John Abrahams
- Jonathan Abrahams
