= Pop-Up Magazine =

Live performance magazine

- Company type: Live magazine
- Founded: 2009
- Founders: Douglas McGray; Lauren Smith; Derek Fagerstrom; Evan Ratliff; Maili Holiman
- Headquarters: San Francisco, California, United States
- Parent: Emerson Collective
- Website: popupmagazine.com

Pop-Up Magazine was a live performance magazine. Its shows typically featured multimedia stories performed on stage by writers, radio producers, photographers, filmmakers, and musicians.

Pop-Up Magazine events were produced two to three times a year. The shows usually contained an average of 12 short stories, with production running approximately 100 minutes. Events were not live-streamed or recorded for later viewing.

Pop-Up Magazine shut down its operations in 2023.

== History ==
Pop-Up Magazine was founded in San Francisco in 2009 by Douglas McGray, Lauren Smith, Derek Fagerstrom, Evan Ratliff, and Maili Holiman.

McGray says the idea for the show came from trying to get different kinds of storytellers and artists together in the same room. "Filmmakers have their film openings, artists will have gallery openings, and writers will have their readings. And we're never at the same things together. We thought about the idea of a live magazine as a way to bring these different communities together and bring their communities of fans together."

The first Pop-Up Magazine show took place in 2009 at the 360-seat Brava Theater in San Francisco's Mission District. In 2010 Pop-Up Magazine grew to a 900-seat auditorium, and the audience reached 2,600 in 2011.

Pop-Up Magazine went on its first national tour in 2015, with stops in San Francisco, Los Angeles, Portland, Seattle, Chicago, and New York City The show toured again in the spring of 2016, before a live audience of 10,000 people, in New York City, Los Angeles, San Francisco, and Oakland.

In 2021, Pop-Up Magazine released its "Sidewalk Issue," which featured art installations interspersed throughout Los Angeles, Brooklyn, and the Hayes Valley neighborhood of San Francisco. Exhibits included murals, graphic novels, and vending machines that dispensed prints of commissioned artwork.

In 2023, Pop-Up Magazine announced that it would shut down operations, citing economic distress caused by the COVID-19 pandemic. The magazine held its farewell tour in 2023, with stops in San Francisco, Los Angeles and New York.

== Collaborations ==
Pop-Up Magazine occasionally partnered with organizations and public figures for special performances outside its own tours. In 2011, they collaborated with SFMOMA for a show about wine and ESPN the Magazine for a show about sports. In 2013, they produced a night of stories and live music inspired by Beck's Song Reader, a collection of sheet music written by Beck and published by McSweeneys. In 2015, they curated Session 8 of TED2015 in Vancouver, producing 11 stories performed on TED's main stage.

== Past contributors ==
- Larry Sultan, photographer
- Daniel Alarcón, novelist, journalist, and co-creator, Radio Ambulante
- Susan Orlean, writer for The New Yorker
- Beck, musician
- Alice Walker, novelist
- Jeff Bridges, actor
- Michael Pollan, author
- Marc Bamuthi Joseph, poet, playwright, dancer
- Alexis Madrigal, editor in chief, Fusion
- John C. Reilly, actor
- Autumn de Wilde, photographer
- Kumail Nanjiani, comedian and actor, Silicon Valley
- Starlee Kine, creator and host, Mystery Show
- Lee Unkrich, Oscar-winning filmmaker, Toy Story 3
- Tracy Clayton and Heben Nigatu, co-hosts, BuzzFeed's Another Round
- Alex Gibney, Oscar-winning filmmaker
- Stephanie Foo, producer, This American Life
- Jon Mooallem, journalist and author
- Jenna Wortham, staff writer, The New York Times Magazine
- Sam Green, Oscar-nominated filmmaker and live cinema performer
- Christopher Hawthorne, architecture critic for the LA Times
- Jad Abumrad, founder and host, Radiolab
- Katy Grannan, photographer
- Ava DuVernay, Oscar-nominated director, Selma
- The Kitchen Sisters, radio producers
- Steven Okazaki, Oscar-winning filmmaker
- Rebecca Solnit, author
- Jon Ronson, author and radio personality
- Sasheer Zamata, cast member, Saturday Night Live
- Alec Soth, photographer
- Samin Nosrat, chef and writer.
