= Evan Ratliff =

American journalist and author (born 1975)

- Born: 1975 (age 50–51); United States
- Occupation: Journalist
- Notable credit(s): Atavist Magazine, Wired, The New Yorker

Evan Ratliff (born c. 1975) is an American journalist, author, and podcast host. Ratliff is a contributor to Wired, Bloomberg Businessweek, and The New Yorker. He has written one book, The Mastermind, and hosted multiple podcasts, including Shell Game, Persona: The French Deception, and Longform. He is the former CEO and co-founder of The Atavist Magazine, a media and software company, and the co-founder of Pop-Up Magazine.

== Career ==
Ratliff is one of the co-authors of Safe: the Race to Protect Ourselves in a Newly Dangerous World. His article "The Zombie Hunters: On the Trail of Cyberextortionists", written for The New Yorker in 2005, was featured in The Best of Technology Writing 2006. He is also the author of the book The Mastermind: Drugs. Empire. Murder. Betrayal, which profiles the criminal Paul Le Roux.

He is the writer and host of the podcasts Shell Game, in which he documents his experiments with an AI-generated voice clone, and Persona: The French Deception, an investigation into the French–Israeli scammer Gilbert Chikli. He was a co-host and founder of the podcast Longform.

=== "Vanishing" experiment ===
In August 2009, Ratliff and Wired magazine conducted an experiment, wherein Ratliff "vanished" as far as knowledge of his whereabouts. Wired offered a $5,000 reward for anyone who could find him before a month had passed. During the experiment, Ratliff remained "on the grid", communicating with his followers on Twitter. The Google Wave development group proposed using the exercise as a test case for the new technology pushing the frontier of real-time web activity. NewsCloud set up its Facebook application community technology to report on the story and enhance community behind the #vanish hash tag. Ratliff used a specially created blog to taunt his "hunters" and Facebook groups emerged to team up and find him, while other groups formed to help him remain at large. He eventually was tracked and found on September 8, 2009, in New Orleans by @vanishteam, a group participating in the challenge to find him.

Ratliff left a coded message — HST—FaLiLV/tRD:aN/HA:aSaTS; TW—tRS/tEKAA/tBotV; FSF—TItN/tGG/tCCoBB; JC—LJ/HoD/aOoP; JM—JGS/MWS/tBotH; GD—BB:aBaJ/tCoM/tMotS — which has been translated to be the authors and titles of a variety of books.

HST—FaLiLV/tRD:aN/HA:aSaTS

- Hunter S. Thompson
  - Fear and Loathing in Las Vegas
  - The Rum Diary: a Novel
  - Hell's Angels: A Strange and Terrible Saga

TW—tRS/tEKAA/tBotV

- Tom Wolfe
  - The Right Stuff
  - The Electric Kool-Aid Acid Test
  - The Bonfire of the Vanities

FSF—TItN/tGG/tCCoBB

- F. Scott Fitzgerald
  - Tender Is the Night
  - The Great Gatsby
  - The Curious Case of Benjamin Button

JC—LJ/HoD/aOoP

- Joseph Conrad
  - Lord Jim
  - Heart of Darkness
  - An Outpost of Progress

JM—JGS/MWS/tBotH

- Joseph Mitchell
  - Joe Gould's Secret
  - McSorley's Wonderful Saloon
  - The Bottom of the Harbor

GD—BB:aBaJ/tCoM/tMotS

- Geoffrey Dyer
  - But Beautiful: A Book About Jazz
  - The Color of Memory
  - The Missing of the Somme

TK—tSoaNM/MBM/SiWR

- Tracy Kidder
  - The Soul of a New Machine
  - Mountains Beyond Mountains
  - Strength in What Remains

=== The Mastermind ===
Ratliff's first book, The Mastermind: Drugs. Empire. Murder. Betrayal, was published in 2019. Based on the seven-part serialized 2016 story "The Mastermind" in The Atavist Magazine, the book explores the rise and fall of cartel boss Paul Calder Le Roux. Ratliff writes in detail about Le Roux's evolution from encryption programmer and the author of E4M disk encryption software, to creator of an online pill empire selling painkillers to customers in the United States, to large-scale drug trafficker, arms dealer, and murderer. The Mastermind was optioned for television by the producers the Russo Brothers and the writer and producer Noah Hawley.

After the book was published, speculation arose around whether Le Roux could be the pseudonymous creator of Bitcoin, Satoshi Nakamoto. The theory initially arose around a fake passport of Le Roux's, published by Ratliff, in which Le Roux used the fake name "Paul Solotshi Calder Le Roux." In a subsequent article in Wired magazine, Ratliff detailed the evidence that Le Roux could be Satoshi, but concluded that the parallels between the two lacked a "single fact that couldn’t be explained away by coincidence."
