= Matthew Power =

American journalist (1974–2014)

- Born: October 22, 1974; Middlebury, Vermont, U.S.
- Died: March 10, 2014 (aged 39); Ajai Wildlife Reserve, Uganda
- Occupation: Journalist

Matthew Power (October 22, 1974 – March 10, 2014) was an American journalist.

== Early life and education ==
Power was born October 22, 1974, in Middlebury, Vermont and grew up in nearby Cornwall. His mother was Jane Steele. His father was John Power. He had two sisters, Julie Ruppert and Elizabeth Robison.

Power studied at Middlebury College and at Columbia University. He left Columbia before graduating to intern at Harper's Magazine.

== Career ==
Power worked both as a print and broadcast journalist. His work appeared in such periodicals as GQ, Harper's Magazine, Men's Journal, National Geographic, and The New York Times. His articles were also collected in annual anthologies such as Best American Travel Writing and Best American Spiritual Writing, and he was a three-time finalist for the Livingston Award for Young Journalists in international reporting. Additionally, WNYC noted Power "was considered one of the most vibrant, young voices in public radio".

== Personal life ==
At the time he died, Power lived in Brooklyn, New York and was married to Jessica Benko.

== Death ==
Power died in Uganda on March 10, 2014, at age 39, while working on an assignment for Men's Journal. He had been accompanying British explorer Levison Wood, who was trekking along the Nile in a year-long attempt to become the first person to walk the length of that river, when Power unexpectedly suffered from severe heatstroke while walking in the bush and died within hours before help could arrive.

== Matthew Power Literary Reporting Award ==
In honor of Power, New York University established the Matthew Power Literary Reporting Award in 2015. Since then, the annual award has supported the work of non-fiction writers.
