= Jennifer Senior =

American journalist

Jennifer Senior is an American journalist, columnist, book critic, and author. She is a staff writer at The Atlantic and has been an Op-Ed columnist for the New York Times since September 2018. Previously, she was a columnist and a book critic at the New York Times, and a staff writer for New York magazine.

In 2022, she won a Pulitzer Prize for Feature Writing and a National Magazine Award for Feature Writing, both for the article "What Bobby McIlvaine Left Behind," published in The Atlantic in September 2021. The essay was reprinted in book form in 2023. It explores the aftermath of 9/11 for surviving family members. She also wrote an account of her mentally handicapped aunt who was institutionalized.

She graduated from Princeton University, majoring in anthropology, in 1991. She is the author of the 2014 New York Times best-selling book All Joy and No Fun: The Paradox of Modern Parenthood.

She has written about her experience suffering from Long COVID: "Long COVID symptoms often change. This syndrome is wily, protean—imagine a mischief of mice moving through the walls of your house and laying waste to different bits of circuitry and infrastructure as they go."
