= Susan Dominus =

American journalist

- Born: Susan Dominus
- Occupations: Journalist, writer, professor

Susan Dominus is an American journalist and professor. She is a writer for The New York Times Magazine. She was part of a Pulitzer Prize for Public Service winning team.

She graduated from Yale University. She is a lecturer at Yale University.

== Works ==
- Dominus, Susan (2025-05-06). The Family Dynamic. New York: Crown. ISBN 978-0-593-13790-1.
