= James Verini =

American journalist and author

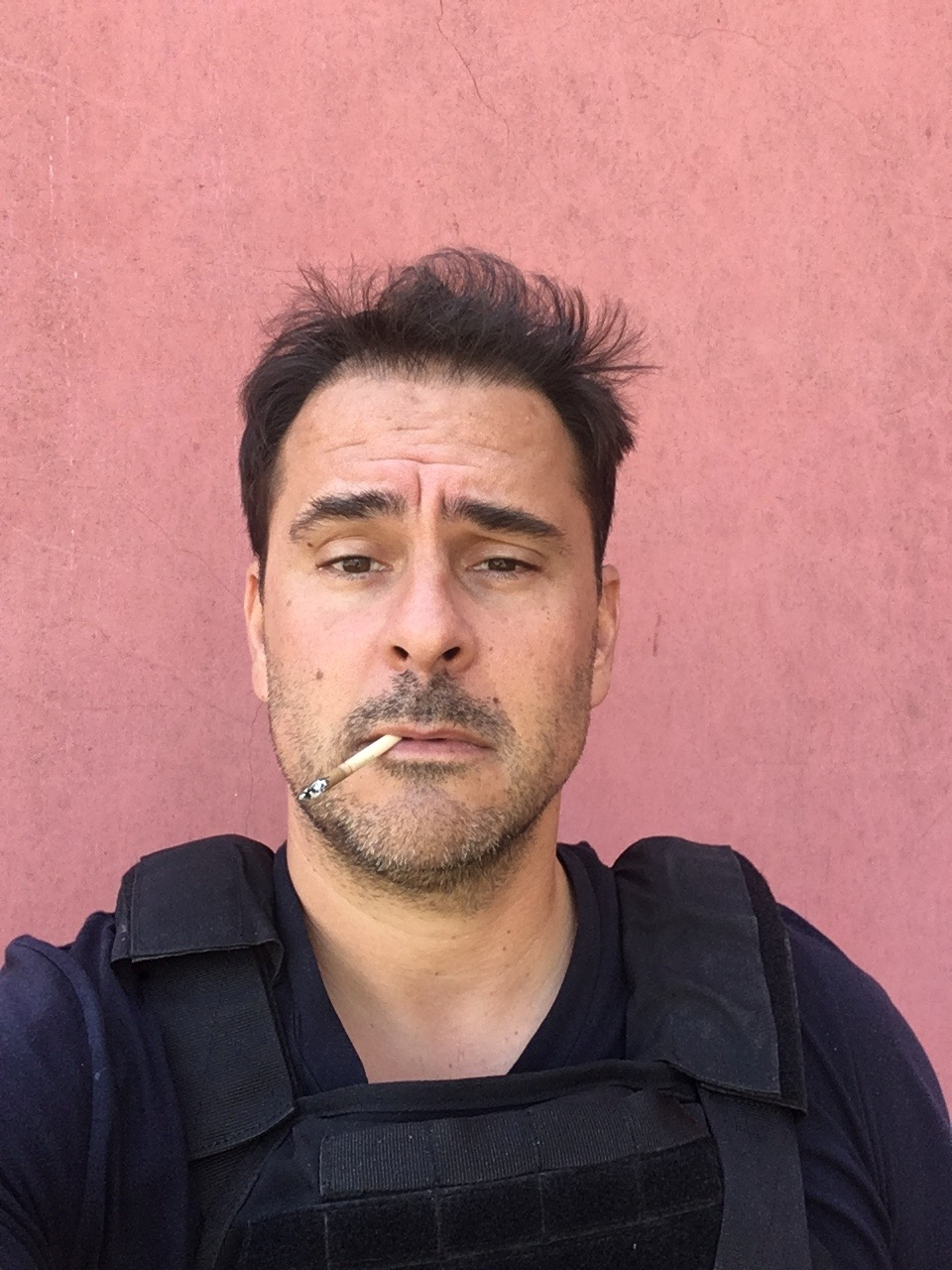
- James Verini in Kherson, Ukraine, June 2023
- Occupations: Journalist and author
- Website: jamesverini.com

James Verini is an American magazine journalist and book author. He is a contributing writer at The New York Times Magazine. He also writes for National Geographic, The New Yorker, Vanity Fair, The Atavist, Foreign Policy, and others. His book They Will Have to Die Now: Mosul and the Fall of the Caliphate was published on September 17, 2019, by W. W. Norton.

== Career ==
In 2015, he received a National Magazine Award for feature writing for "Love and Ruin," an article in The Atavist about the history of American intervention in Afghanistan. He won a 2015 George Polk Award for "Should the United Nations Wage War to Keep Peace?", about the civil war in Democratic Republic of Congo, in National Geographic.

== Bibliography ==
- Verini, James (April 20, 2015). "Escape or die". A Reporter at Large. The New Yorker. Vol. 91, no. 9. pp. 66–75.
- — (2019). They will have to die now : Mosul and the fall of the Caliphate. W.W. Norton.
- Verini, James; Jao, Jonathan (2026). The theater: courage and survival in the defining atrocity of the Ukraine War. New York: Simon & Schuster. ISBN 978-1-6680-6220-3.
