= Long-form journalism =

Branch dedicated to larger amounts of content

Long-form journalism is a genre of journalism characterized by in-depth reporting and storytelling that has more substantial content than the average news report. These pieces often explore topics with greater detail, context and narrative techniques, blending factual reporting with literary elements such as character development, scene-setting and dialogue. Because long-form journalism usually employs stylistic and structural elements often used in fiction, it is sometimes referred to as literary journalism or narrative journalism. While traditionally associated with print newspaper articles, the digital revolution expanded the genre's reach to online magazines, newspapers and other digital platforms, which often use a blend of multimedia to create an immersive reader experience.

== Characteristics ==
- Structure: Long-form journalism does not follow the inverted pyramid structure that many news reporters and editors favor. Instead, it presents the factual reporting of news in a developed narrative similar to literary fiction, often organizing events chronologically.
- Dialogue: Long-form journalism will often include dialogue between two characters as well as internal monologue, or representations of what a character is thinking.
- Detail: Long-form stories often include vivid, descriptive details and symbolism.
- Voice: The storyteller's voice and style is often more distinct in long-form stories. The author may even use a first-person point of view.
- Length: Long-form works aim to capture an audience's attention for an extended period of time. For written articles, this results in lengthier, more content-heavy stories, typically consisting of more than 2,000 words.

Rather than simply recording what happened, these techniques often serve to explore how and why certain events unfold. The resulting stories provide in-depth coverage of multiple aspects of a topic.

Reporting and gathering information for a long-form story is labor-intensive and time consuming, often requiring the long-form journalist to immerse his or herself in the story and form relationships with its characters.

=== Multimedia long-form journalism ===
In addition to linguistic characteristics, long-form journalism on digital platforms typically uses multimedia elements to enhance the readers' experience and further immerse them in the story. These digital long-form stories will usually guide the reader through a multimedia experience with seamless transitions between written and visual interactive content. Long-form stories that use data to enhance the narrative will likely include data visualizations, like charts and graphs that may even have an interactive component for digital publications.

Multimedia long-form journalism may also take the form of narrative podcasts.

== History ==
=== Origins ===
The narrative structure of long-form journalism was common to most news stories in the 18th and 19th centuries, when news articles would often resemble short stories with chronological structures that placed the most newsworthy information, the climax, toward the middle or end. But in the early 1900s, news outlets started emphasizing hard facts over artistic storytelling in response to a push for more objective journalism.

=== New Journalism (1960s and 1970s) ===
The 1960s and 1970s marked a resurgence of narrative techniques in what was known as New Journalism. Influential writers from this period, such as Tom Wolfe, Joan Didion and Hunter S. Thompson, used this hybrid genre of writing nonfiction using fictional storytelling methods. Some examples New Journalism include Truman Capote's "In Cold Blood" and Gay Talese’s “Frank Sinatra Has a Cold.”

=== 21st century ===
The digital revolution marked a shift away from print publications. Now as news outlets transition to digital publication, these techniques are often coupled with multimedia elements like photo, audio, video, graphics and maps to further immerse the reader in the experience. The digital long-form story gained popularity in the 2010s, particularly after the release of John Branch's New York Times article, Snow Fall: The Avalanche at Tunnel Creek. Blogs and media organizations including Medium, The Caravan, BuzzFeed and The New York Times created or expanded long-form coverage, and new companies such as The Atavist, Longreads.com, Longform.org, and Longformarticles.net were founded to capitalize on the new interest.

== Notable long-form journalism (21st century) ==
=== Periodicals ===
- The Atlantic Monthly
- The Economist
- The Nation
- The New Yorker
- The New York Times Magazine
- Harper's Magazine
- Atavist Magazine is a publishing platform that has been releasing original long-form stories since 2011.

=== Stories ===
- "Snow Fall: The Avalanche at Tunnel Creek" by New York Times reporter John Branch won a Peabody Award and the 2013 Pulitzer Prize in Feature Writing. "Snow Fall" is often cited as a landmark publication in digital long-form journalism for its innovative use of immersive digital storytelling techniques.
- "The Cove," a documentary that prompted public outcry over dolphin killings in Japan.
- "A New Age of Walls," a 2016 Washington Post multimedia series about immigration.

=== Websites ===
- Longreads
- Longform.org
- ProPublica

== See also ==
- Narrative journalism
- Literary journalism
- Investigative journalism
- Data journalism
- New Journalism
