= John Abrams =

John Abrams may refer to:

- John Abrams (field hockey) (born 1934), New Zealand field hockey player
- John N. Abrams (1946–2018), United States Army general

== See also ==
- John Abram (born 1959), Anglo-Canadian composer
