= Gabriel Mac =

American author and journalist

- Education: Ohio State University; University of New Orleans
- Occupations: Journalist; Writer
- Years active: 2007-present

Gabriel Mac (formerly known as Mac McClelland) is an American author and journalist. From 2007 to 2012, he was a staff reporter at Mother Jones, eventually in the position of human rights reporter. He has also written for The New York Times Magazine, Rolling Stone, and other publications.

== Early life and education ==
Mac was born in Cleveland, Ohio.

In 2002, Mac received a B.A. in English and psychology from Ohio State University. In 2006, he received an MFA from University of New Orleans in nonfiction.

== Career ==
From 2007 to 2013, Mac worked at Mother Jones, where he began as an intern, working his way up from fact checker and copy editor until he was published as a writer. From 2010 to 2013, he was a Human Rights reporter, a position that was created for Mac.

Mac has covered both domestic and foreign stories, with international locations including Thailand, Haiti, Australia, Burma, Uganda, the Democratic Republic of the Congo, and Bhutan. Mac worked on extensive coverage of 2010's Deepwater Horizon oil spill. He has appeared on MSNBC, PBS, NPR, Democracy Now!, the BBC, and Al Jazeera. He has been described variously as trustworthy by Newsweek, "a total bad-ass" by The American Prospect, and "a profane young bisexual" by The Wall Street Journal.

In 2010, Mac published For Us Surrender Is Out of the Question: A Story from Burma's Never-Ending War, which was about his experience in Thailand and accounts of the refugee crisis of those fleeing nearby Burma. He had initially gone to Thailand in 2006 to teach English and spent six weeks in the country, where he learned more about the Karen refugee crisis.

In July 2011, Mac wrote an essay for GOOD about trying to use violent sex to treat his posttraumatic stress disorder, which Mac said was triggered by reporting the 2010 Haiti earthquake, and included first-hand recounting via Twitter of being with a woman traumatized by rape. The writer Roxane Gay, a Haitian-American, was supportive of Mac recounting personal, first-hand experience in Haiti, Louisiana, and other locations Mac lived and worked as a writer. Journalist Marjorie Valbrun wrote in Slate that she found the article problematic from a journalist's perspective, while writer Debra Dickerson, also writing for Slate, felt that the article was brave and fearless.

Jezebel published an "open letter to the editors" of GOOD signed by 36 female journalists and researchers, condemning Mac's lack of understanding of the context of Haiti, saying that he was perpetuating stereotypes. Journalist Elspeth Reeve wrote in defense of Mac's essay in The Atlantic, examining the motivations behind the Jezebel letter. Conor Friedersdorf, another journalist at The Atlantic, disputed the criticism that Mac was operating under a "colonialist mindset", instead seeing the Jezebel letter as unjustifiably scapegoating Mac. In Essence, Haitian-American writer Edwidge Danticat said that he met the Haitian rape victim that Mac wrote about, and alleged that Mac did not have permission to write about the victim. Journalist Ansel Herz blogged that he felt that Mac had breached journalistic ethics. Journalists Amanda Taub and Jina Moore and others questioned the live-tweeting reportage method as well as the question of consent. Mac responded via a Ms. interview, discussing the response to his personal essay.

In March 2012, Mother Jones published an article by Mac on working undercover at a warehouse as a picker doing third-party logistics.

In 2015, Mac published his second book, Irritable Hearts: A PTSD Love Story, which described his experience with post-traumatic stress disorder. The book was a further examination of his personal journey with PTSD, which was initially the subject of the essay he wrote for GOOD magazine in 2011.

In 2016, Mac traveled to Cuba to document extreme birders for Audubon.

In 2017, Mac wrote a feature for Rolling Stone about exploring the use of hallucinogens to treat depression and PTSD, and the underground network used by practitioners in the United States.

Since 2013, Mac has worked as a freelance journalist.

In 2021, Mac was featured on the cover of New York Magazine, where he discusses his experiences with phalloplasty, a gender-affirming surgery for transgender men.

== Personal life ==
Mac met Nico Ansel in 2010 while reporting on the earthquake in Haiti. In 2019, he mentioned that he had "cis-hetero-married twice, wearing long white dresses," and divorced twice, in reference to relationships prior to his transition.

In a travel essay for the New York Times in October 2018, Mac mentioned in passing that he was "not just queer but also openly trans." The following year, GQ published a more explicit essay, written under his new name (stylized on the title page as "Gabriel Mac ~~McClelland~~"), discussing his history with sexual abuse and his recent experiences with mental and medical gender transition.

In an article for New York Magazine covering his phalloplasty procedure, Mac states that he is gay and asexual, and has a boyfriend.

== Awards ==
- June 2010: The Sidney Award, for the Mother Jones article, "Depression, Abuse, Suicide: Fishermen's Wives Face Post-Spill Trauma", about the 2010 Deepwater Horizon oil spill
- October 2010: Society of Professional Journalists, Northern California Chapter, Outstanding Emerging Journalist
- October 2010: Online News Association, Online Journalism Award, Online Topical Reporting/Blogging, Medium Site for Mother Jones team coverage of the BP oil spill
- December 2010: San Francisco Chronicle, Best of 2010 Books by Bay Area Authors for For Us Surrender Is Out of the Question: A Story From Burma's Never-Ending War
- April 2011: National Magazine Award for Feature Writing, nomination for Mother Jones article, "For Us Surrender Is Out of the Question"
- August 2011: Society of Environmental Journalists, 1st place, Outstanding Beat Reporting, Large Market for team coverage of BP Oil Spill coverage: Josh Harkinson, Mac McClelland, Kate Sheppard, Julia Whitty, for Mother Jones
- August 2011: Dayton Literary Peace Prize, finalist (book)
- 2012: Society of Professional Journalists, Northern California Chapter, Award for Feature Writing for Mother Jones article, "I Was a Warehouse Wage Slave"
- April 2013: National Magazine Award for Feature Writing, nomination for Mother Jones article, "I Was a Warehouse Wage Slave""
- 2013: Society of Professional Journalists, Northern California Chapter, Award for Feature Storytelling for Mother Jones article, "Schizophrenic. Killer. My Cousin"
- 2013: Association for Women in Communications, Clarion Award for Feature Writing
- 2014: Association for Women in Communications, Clarion Award for Feature Writing
- 2013: Webby Award, official honoree
- 2013: MOLLY National Journalism Prize, shortlist
- 2017: National Magazine Award for Feature Writing, nomination for Audubon article, "Delusion Is the Thing With Feathers"

== Works and publications ==
Books

- McClelland, Mac (2010). For Us Surrender Is Out of the Question a Story from Burma's Never-Ending War. New York: Soft Skull Press. ISBN 978-1-593-76378-7. OCLC 693761834.
- McClelland, Mac (2015). Irritable Hearts: A PTSD Love Story. New York: Flatiron Books. ISBN 978-1-250-05289-6. OCLC 938241219.
