= Jay Caspian Kang =

American writer and editor (born 1979)

- Born: December 31, 1979 (age 46); Seoul, South Korea
- Education: Bowdoin College (BA); Columbia University (MFA)
- Occupations: Writer, editor
- Employer: The New Yorker
- Notable work: The Dead Do Not Improve

Jay Caspian Kang (born December 31, 1979) is an American writer, editor, television journalist and podcast host. He is a staff writer at The New Yorker. Previously he was an editor of Grantland, a reporter for The New York Times Magazine, and a columnist for The New York Times's opinion section. He was also an Emmy-nominated correspondent on Vice News Tonight and cohosts the podcast Time to Say Goodbye. His debut novel The Dead Do Not Improve was released by the Hogarth/Random House in the summer of 2012. In 2021, he published The Loneliest Americans, a memoir and reported work examining Asian American identity.

== Early life and education ==
Kang was born in Seoul, South Korea, on New Year's Eve 1979. He chose his own middle name at the age of eight, inspired by the character of Prince Caspian from The Chronicles of Narnia. He grew up in Cambridge, Massachusetts, while his father did post-doctoral work in organic chemistry at Harvard University, and in Chapel Hill, North Carolina. He received his undergraduate degree from Bowdoin College and received his Master of Fine Arts (MFA) degree from Columbia University in 2005.

== Career ==
=== Early career ===
After receiving his MFA, Kang spent a number of years in San Francisco and Los Angeles teaching creative writing and world history. He says he spent more than 40 hours a week playing poker at the Commerce Casino during this time. In January 2010, Kang began writing for literary basketball blog FreeDarko. In his first contribution to the blog, "The Lives of Others," Kang wrote an analysis of how Taiwanese-American basketball player Jeremy Lin and Chinese-American rapper MC Jin "offered an alternative interpretation of what it meant to be an Asian-American." He asserted that Asian-Americans "have been conditioned our entire lives to imagine White," and that "Like Jin before him, what Jeremy Lin represents is a re-conception of our bodies, a visible measure of how the emasculated Asian-American body might measure up to the mythic legion of Big Black supermen." Kang has continued to write about race throughout his career, with "A significant majority of Kang's columns, television segments, and magazine features hav[ing] a central focus on the role of race in culture."

Kang was subsequently noticed in 2010 by several prominent editors for his work, "The High is Always the Pain and the Pain is Always the High", a lengthy first-person essay concerning his gambling addiction. The work has been seen as a turning point in Kang's career.

=== The Dead Do Not Improve ===
Kang's debut novel The Dead Do Not Improve was released in 2012 by Hogarth/Random House. The book was summarized by Kirkus Book Reviews as a "Pynchon-esque menagerie of California surfers, cops, thugs and dot-com workers [that] converge in a comic anti-noir." The book revolves around a disgruntled MFA graduate named Philip Kim, who discovers that his elderly neighbor has been murdered, and who soon becomes the unlikely protagonist of a quickly unfolding mystery involving a struggle between fictionalized versions of two San Francisco institutions: Cafe Gratitude and Kink.com. Kang has said that he wanted to write the book about Korean American male anger and reflect on how Seung-Hui Cho, the perpetrator of the Virginia Tech shooting, was also Korean.

=== Subsequent work ===
Kang joined Vice in June 2016 as civil rights correspondent, appearing on HBO's Vice News Tonight. He was nominated for an Emmy Award for a 2016 segment of the show on high school students joining the national anthem protests of police brutality. Kang is also a staff writer for The New York Times Magazine. Previously he was a founding editor of the ESPN sports and pop-culture blog Grantland, and then served as editor of the science and technology blog Elements at The New Yorker from April to November 2014.

In the spring of 2020, Kang began co-hosting the podcast Time to Say Goodbye with E. Tammy Kim and Andrew B. Liu. Begun during the COVID-19 pandemic to discuss the pandemic in an international context, Time to Say Goodbye expanded to cover past and current events relevant to Asian and Asian American culture, politics, as well as general left-wing politics.

In 2021, Kang became one of the authors of the newly introduced subscriber-only opinion newsletters of The New York Times. Later in the year he published The Loneliest Americans, a part memoir, part reported work on Asian American experience. It was named to NPR and Time's lists of best books of 2021.

In September 2022, ESPN Films announced that production was complete on a 30 for 30 documentary on Michael Chang, directed by Kang. The documentary, called American Son, was about Chang's 1989 French Open run and the coinciding Tiananmen Square massacre. In May 2023, Kang tweeted that ESPN had postponed the documentary's release to July 2024, pulling it from its world premiere at the 2023 Tribeca Film Festival. In a pre-festival roundup, Variety had called the film "an astute, incisive directorial debut" for Kang.

== Personal life ==
Kang is a thyroid cancer survivor. He has remarked that "Surviving cancer can cleanse the soul, sure, but once you're left facing the rest of your life, a patient's vision can tunnel down to a list of demands."

Kang is married and lives in Berkeley, California. His daughter was born in January 2017.
