= The Best American Travel Writing =

Yearly anthology of travel literature

The Best American Travel Writing was a yearly anthology of travel literature published in United States magazines. It was started in 2000 as part of The Best American Series published by Houghton Mifflin. Essays were chosen using the same procedure as other titles in the Best American series; the series editor chose about 100 article candidates, from which the guest editor picked 25 or so for publication; the remaining runner-up articles were listed in the appendix.

Jason Wilson was the series editor from its inception in 2000 to its final edition in 2021.

== Guest editors ==
- 2000: Bill Bryson
- 2001: Paul Theroux
- 2002: Frances Mayes
- 2003: Ian Frazier
- 2004: Pico Iyer
- 2005: Jamaica Kincaid
- 2006: Tim Cahill
- 2007: Susan Orlean
- 2008: Anthony Bourdain
- 2009: Simon Winchester
- 2010: Bill Buford
- 2011: Sloane Crosley
- 2012: William Vollmann
- 2013: Elizabeth Gilbert
- 2014: Paul Theroux
- 2015: Andrew McCarthy
- 2016: Bill Bryson
- 2017: Lauren Collins
- 2018: Cheryl Strayed
- 2019: Alexandra Fuller
- 2020: Robert Macfarlane
- 2021: Padma Lakshmi
