= XXI International AIDS Conference, 2016 =

In Durban, South Africa

The XXI International AIDS Conference was held in Durban, South Africa from 18 to 22 July 2016 at the Inkosi Albert Luthuli International Convention Centre.

It was organized by the International AIDS Society (IAS). About 18,000 scientists, campaigners and politicians were expected to attend. Prominent speakers included Charlize Theron, Elton John, Prince Harry and Bill Gates.
