= Azmat Khan =

American journalist

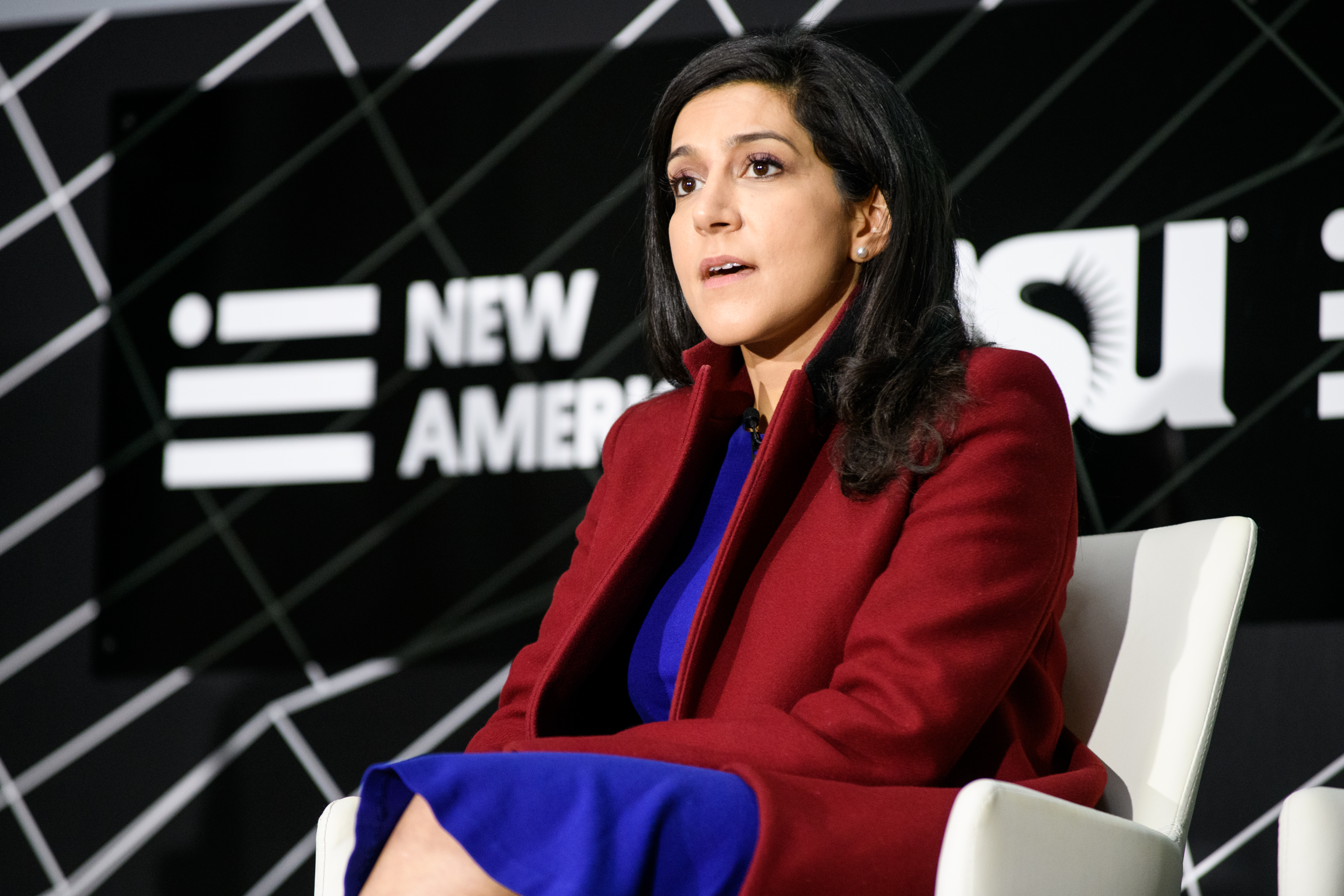
- Khan in 2019
- Education: University of Michigan (BA); University of Oxford (MSt)
- Occupations: Journalist, writer, educator
- Awards: 2022 Pulitzer Prize

Azmat Khan is an American journalist and winner of a 2022 Pulitzer Prize for international reporting. She is the Patti Cadby Birch Assistant Professor at the Columbia University Graduate School of Journalism. She is the inaugural Director of the Simon and June Li Center for Global Journalism.

Her investigative report in The New York Times titled "Hidden Pentagon Records Reveal Patterns Of Failure In Deadly Airstrikes" was called "extraordinary" by WNYC The Takeaway and was the lead article in the Pulitzer Prize-winning coverage.

Her work has also won two National Magazine Awards, two Overseas Press Club awards, the Polk Award, and the Hillman Prize.

== Education ==
Khan has a B.A. degree from the University of Michigan, and was a Clarendon Scholar at the University of Oxford where she gained a M.St. degree. She has also studied at The American University in Cairo.

== Career ==
In December 2021, Khan's report "Hidden Pentagon Records Reveal Patterns of Failure in Deadly Airstrikes" was published in The New York Times describing how efforts to minimize the civilian death count fell far short of the approach promised by the US military for its use of airstrikes in the war against ISIL. The Times reported that airstrikes against ISIL, as well as in the war in Afghanistan, was marked by

"flawed intelligence, poor targeting and thousands of civilian deaths."

The Times reported that efforts to minimize civilian casualties diminished after President Trump assumed office in 2017, stating

"... the authority to approve strikes was pushed further down the chain of command, even as an overwhelming majority of strikes were carried out in the heat of war, and not planned far in advance."

The Times reported that the US military systematically under-reported casualties, providing a total death count of 1,417, when the actual count was significantly higher. The report states that the military made little effort to accurately determine civilian casualties after the airstrikes. The military was also reluctant to divulge information about the casualties, in spite of promises of transparency, and news media were required to make numerous requests under the Freedom of Information Act, and had to repeatedly sue the US military to produce data. This report was among those for which Khan and her colleagues were awarded the 2022 Pulitzer Prize for International Reporting.

As of May 2022 she is writing a book for Random House investigating America's air wars.

== Personal life ==
Khan traces her roots to Pakistan, but was born and raised in Grand Rapids, Michigan.
