= Atavist Magazine =

Multimedia publishing platform

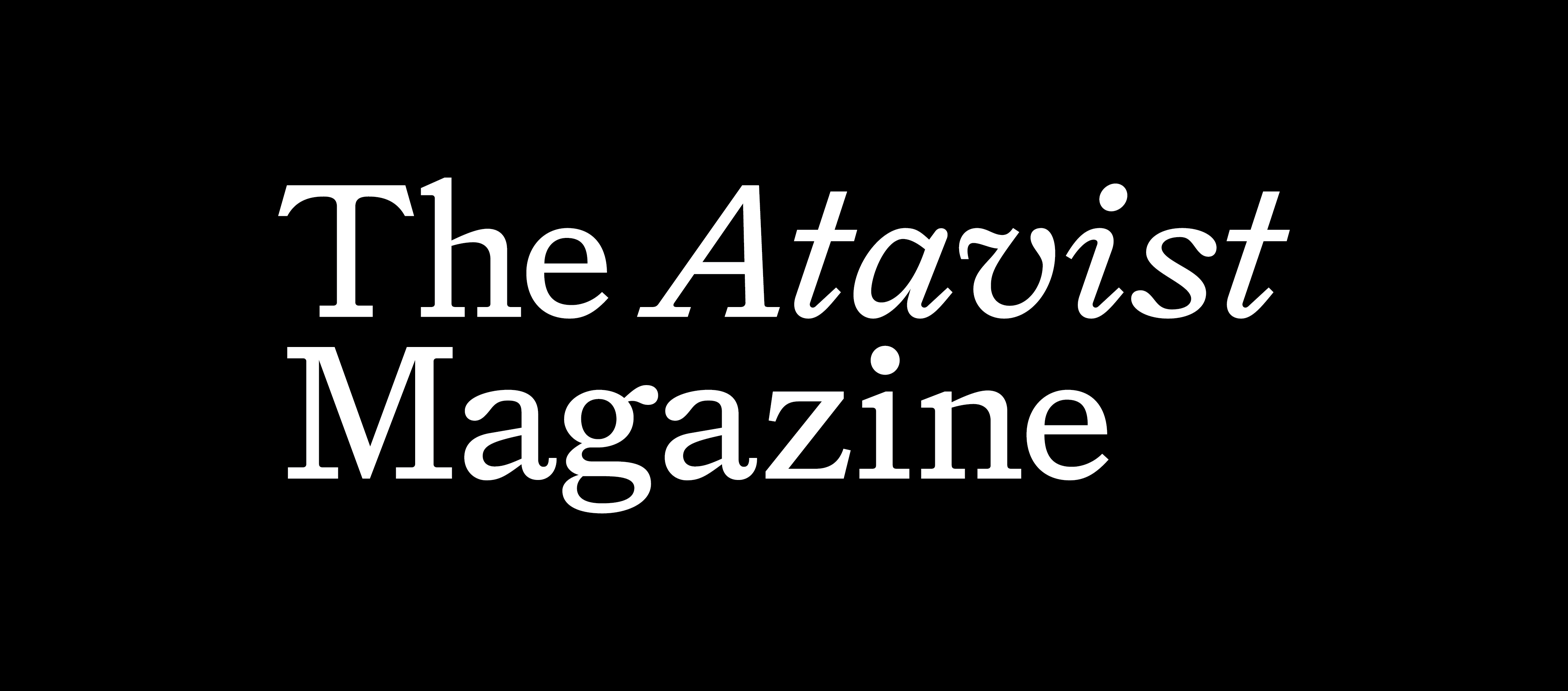
- Editor: Seyward Darby
- Categories: Longform
- Frequency: Monthly
- Founded: 2011 (13 years)
- Company: Automattic
- Based in: Brooklyn, New York, United States
- Language: English
- Website: magazine.atavist.com

The Atavist Magazine is an American publication based in Brooklyn, New York. It features longform and investigative journalism. It was founded in 2011, through Silicon Valley funding by Jefferson Rabb, Evan Ratliff, and Nicholas Thompson. In 2018 the paper was bought by Automattic, who currently owns it.

The Atavist Magazine is unique as instead of publishing multiple articles, every edition of The Atavist only has one longform story. The nominal source of the magazine's title is derived from the concept of an atavism, a biological reversion of an ancestral trait. For despite being a magazine, The Atavist Magazine does not have a physical form and instead sends each edition through email, which is sent monthly.

== History ==
The Atavist Magazine started as an idea between Jefferson Rabb, Evan Ratliff, and Nicholas Thompson, after a few drinks. After raising 1.5 Million in seed money from Silicon Valley, the first issue of The Atavist Magazine was published on November 1, 2011. The first edition was the story "Piano Demon" by Brendan I. Koerner, who had previously worked with The New York Times and Wired. "Piano Demon" was about the life of Teddy Weatherford, a jazz musician. Due to the magazine not being in print, The Atavist Magazine was only available on iPads, Kindles, or Nook e-books. Along with the magazine, Creativist Software was also launched by the founders, which has been used by The Paris Review, Pearson, ⁣The Christian Science Monitor and Vice.

In the beginning of 2012 the multimedia Brightline, later known as Atavist Books, was launched in partnership with Barry Diller, Scott Rudin, and Frances Coady. The first publication was the novella "Sleep Donation" by Karen Russell. The book is about a fictional world where insomnia is fatal, and a growing problem throughout the world, with private corporations harvesting sleep. The novella was well received.

At the very end of 2014 Atavist Books was shut down with its assets being folded into either The Atavist (At the time the parent company of The Atavist Magazine) and IAC. This was despite the recent success of the book, "The Trials of White Boy Rick" by Evan Hughes. Overall, Atavist Books published 2 books and 4 novellas.

In 2015, after failing to raise enough money, The Atavist had to cut its staff in half. To try to increase profitability, The Atavist shuttered down their native apps in favor of a website.

In June 2018 The Atavist Magazine announced that they were being acquired by Automattic, the developer of WordPress. This was due to a lack of funding.

== See also ==
- Online Magazines
