= National Magazine Awards =

American accolade for print and digital publications

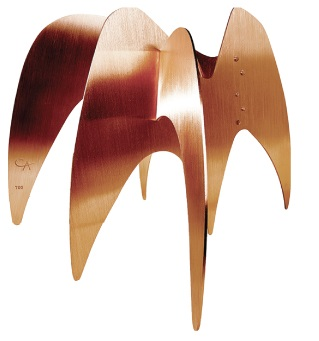
- Ellie Award
- Awarded for: Excellence in the magazine industry
- Sponsored by: American Society of Magazine Editors in association with Columbia University Graduate School of Journalism
- Date: Annual
- Location: New York City
- Country: United States
- Presented by: American Society of Magazine Editors
- First award: 1966; 60 years ago
- Website: www.asme.media/asme-awards

The National Magazine Awards, also known as the Ellie Awards, honor print and digital publications that consistently demonstrate superior execution of editorial objectives, innovative techniques, noteworthy enterprise and imaginative design. Originally limited to print magazines, the awards now recognize magazine-quality journalism published in any medium. They are sponsored by the American Society of Magazine Editors (ASME) in association with Columbia University Graduate School of Journalism, and are administered by ASME in New York City. The awards have been presented annually since 1966.

The Ellie Awards are judged by magazine journalists and journalism educators selected by the administrators of the awards. More than 300 judges participate every year. Each judging group chooses five finalists (seven in Reporting and Feature Writing); the same judging group selects one of the finalists to be the winner of the Ellie Award in that category. Judging results are subject to the approval of the National Magazine Awards Board, which is composed of current and former officers of ASME, the dean of the Columbia University Graduate School of Journalism, and veteran judges.

Finalists in each of the Ellie Award categories receive certificates of recognition. The winner in each category receives a reproduction of Alexander Calder's stabile "Elephant", the symbol of the awards since 1970. Among the notable changes for 2017 are the expansion of the Design and Photography categories to include digital entries and the suspension of the Fiction award.

== Current categories ==
=== General Excellence ===
Honors print and digital magazines in several categories based on content and audience.

Businessweek received the first ever award in 1973. No award was given from 1974 through 1980. When General Excellence returned as a category in 1981, it was given to four magazines per year until 1998, when five magazines received General Excellence awards. Six magazines received awards in 2002. From 2003 to 2010, the award went to seven different magazines and in 2011, to eight. Since 2012, the award has gone to six magazines.

Starting 2016, it is defined into four groups: "News, Sports and Entertainment", "Service and Lifestyle", "Special Interest", "Literature, Science and Politics".

Year	Title
1973	Businessweek
1981	Glamour, Businessweek, Audubon, ARTnews
1982	Science 81, Rocky Mountain, Newsweek, Camera Arts
1983	Science 82, Louisiana Life, LIFE, Harper's Magazine
1984	Outside, National Geographic, House & Garden, The American Lawyer
1985	Manhattan, Inc., American Heritage, American Health, TIME
1986	New England Monthly, Money, Discover, 3-2-1 Contact
1987	People, New England Monthly, ELLE, Common Cause
1988	The Sciences, Parents, Hippocrates, Fortune
1989	Vanity Fair, Sports Illustrated, The Sciences, American Heritage
1990	Metropolitan Home, 7 Days, Texas Monthly, Sports Illustrated
1991	The New Republic, Interview, Glamour, Condé Nast Traveler
1992	Texas Monthly, The New Republic, National Geographic, Mirabella
1993	Newsweek, Lingua Franca, The Atlantic, American Photo
1994	Health, Businessweek, Wired, Print
1995	The New Yorker, Men's Journal, I.D., Entertainment Weekly
1996	The Sciences, Civilization, Outside, Businessweek
1997	I.D., Wired, Vanity Fair, Outside
1998	Rolling Stone, Preservation, Outside, DoubleTake
1999	Vanity Fair', I.D., Fast Company, Condé Nast Traveler
2000	Saveur, The New Yorker, Nest, National Geographic
2001	Teen People, The New Yorker, Mother Jones, The American Scholar
2002	Vibe, Print, Newsweek, National Geographic Adventure, Entertainment Weekly
2003	Texas Monthly, Parenting, Foreign Policy, ESPN The Magazine, The Atlantic, Architectural Record
2004	Popular Science, Newsweek, Gourmet, Aperture, Budget Living, Chicago
2005	Wired, The New Yorker, Print, Martha Stewart Weddings, Glamour, Dwell
2006	The Virginia Quarterly Review, TIME, New York, Harper's Magazine, Esquire, ESPN The Magazine
2007	Wired, Rolling Stone, New York, National Geographic, Foreign Policy, Bulletin of the Atomic Scientists
2008	Print, The New Yorker, National Geographic, Mother Jones, GQ, Backpacker
2009	Foreign Policy, Field & Stream, Wired, Texas Monthly, Reader's Digest
2010	San Francisco, New York, National Geographic, Mother Jones, GQ, Men's Health
2011	Women's Health, Scientific American, Garden & Gun, Poetry, New York, LA mag
2012	Inc., House Beautiful, IEEE Spectrum, O, The Oprah Magazine, Bloomberg Businessweek
2013	The Paris Review, Martha Stewart Weddings, National Geographic, Vogue, Outside
2014	New York, Poetry, Inc., Field & Stream, Bon Appétit, Sunset
2015	Garden & Gun, Glamour, The Hollywood Reporter, Nautilus Quarterly, The New Yorker, Men's Health
2016	New York, Lucky Peach, The Hollywood Reporter, Oxford American
2017	ESPN The Magazine, Bon Appétit, Modern Farmer, The Marshall Project
2018	The New Yorker, The New York Times Style Magazine, San Francisco, Aperture
2019	National Geographic, The New York Times Style Magazine, Kazoo, Virginia Quarterly Review
2020	The New York Times Magazine, Bon Appétit, The Hollywood Reporter, Quanta
2021	The New Yorker, The New York Times Style Magazine, Audubon, Stranger’s Guide
2022	The Atlantic, Harper's Bazaar, Car and Driver, Stranger's Guide
2023	The Atlantic, Cook's Illustrated, The Marshall Project, Grist
2024	The Atlantic, Highsnobiety, The Marshall Project, The Yale Review
2025	ProPublica, Esquire, STAT, Mother Jones

=== Design ===
Previously known as Visual Excellence (1970–1979). Honors overall excellence in print magazine design. Merged with Photography in 2019.

Year	Title
1970	Look
1971	Vogue
1972	Esquire
1973	Horizon
1974	Newsweek
1975	Country Journal and National Lampoon
1976	Horticulture
1977	Rolling Stone
1978	Architectural Digest
1979	Audubon
1980	GEO
1981	Attenzione
1982	Nautical Quarterly
1983	New York
1984	House & Garden
1985	Forbes
1986	TIME
1987	ELLE
1988	LIFE
1989	Rolling Stone
1990	Esquire
1991	Condé Nast Traveler
1992	Vanity Fair
1993	Harper's Bazaar
1994	Allure
1995	Martha Stewart Living
1996	Wired
1997	I.D. Magazine
1998	Entertainment Weekly
1999	ESPN The Magazine
2000	Fast Company
2001	Nest
2002	Details
2003	Details
2004	Esquire
2005	Kids: Fun Stuff to Do Together
2006	New York
2007	New York
2008	Wired
2009	Wired
2010	Wired
2011	GQ
2012	GQ
2013	TIME
2014	New York
2015	New York
2016	Wired
2017	The California Sunday Magazine
2018	GQ
2020	Bon Appétit
2021	National Geographic
2022	National Geographic
2023	GQ
2024	Rest of World
2025	New York Times Opinion

=== Photography ===
Honors overall excellence in print magazine photography. Merged with Design in 2019.

Year	Magazine
1985	LIFE
1986	Vogue
1987	National Geographic
1988	Rolling Stone
1989	National Geographic
1990	Texas Monthly
1991	National Geographic
1992	National Geographic
1993	Harper's Bazaar
1994	Martha Stewart Living
1995	Rolling Stone
1996	Saveur
1997	National Geographic
1998	W
1999	Martha Stewart Living
2000	Vanity Fair
2001	National Geographic
2002	Vanity Fair
2003	Condé Nast Traveler
2004	City
2005	Gourmet
2006	W
2007	National Geographic
2008	Gourmet
2009	GQ
2010	Vanity Fair
2011	W
2012	Vogue
2013	National Geographic
2014	Bon Appétit
2015	National Geographic
2016	The California Sunday Magazine
2017	The California Sunday Magazine
2018	W
2020	National Geographic
2021	Stranger's Guide
2022	Essence
2023	Smithsonian
2024	New York
2025	The New Yorker

=== Design and Photography ===
Merged from two former categories. Divided awards into "News and Opinion" – Honors the visual excellence of print and digital magazines covering politics, business, technology and entertainment. – and "Service and Lifestyle" – Honors the visual excellence of print and digital magazines covering fashion, food, travel and design.

Year	Magazine(s)
2019	Wired, GQ Style

=== Feature Photography ===
Previously known as Photo Portfolio/Photo Essay (2004–2006) and Photo Portfolio (2007–2010). Honors the use of original photography in a feature story, photo-essay or photo portfolio. Incorporated in Photography in 2022. No separate category starting in 2023.

Year	Magazine	Article(s)	Author(s)	Editor
2004	W	"The Kate Moss Portfolio", September		Patrick McCarthy, chairman and editorial director Dennis Freedman, vice chairman and creative director
2005	TIME	"The Tragedy of Sudan", October 4	By James Nachtwey	James Kelly, managing editor Arthur Hochstein, art director
2006	Rolling Stone	"The Edge of the World", November 17	By Sebastiao Salgado	Jann S. Wenner, editor and publisher Will Dana, managing editor
2007	City	"White Heat", April	By Horacio Salinas	John McDonald, editorial director and publisher; Fabrice G. Frere, creative director and COO
2008	Vanity Fair	"Killers Kill, Dead Men Die: A 2007 Hollywood Portfolio", March	By Annie Leibovitz and Michael Roberts	Graydon Carter, editor David Harris, design director
2009	The New Yorker	"Service", September 29	By Platon	David Remnick, editor Elisabeth Biondi, visuals editor
2010	The New Yorker	"Portraits of Power", December 7	Photographs by Platon	David Remnick, editor
2011	ESPN The Magazine	"Bodies We Want", October 18	Reporting by Morty Ain	Gary Belsky, editor in chief
2012	The New York Times Magazine	"Vamps, Crooks & Killers", December 11	Photographs by Alex Prager, Introduction by A.O. Scott	Hugo Lindgren, editor in chief
2013	W	"Good Kate, Bad Kate", March	Feature by Will Self, Photographs by Steven Klein	Stefano Tonchi, editor in chief
2014	W	"Stranger Than Paradise", May	Photographs by Tim Walker	Stefano Tonchi, editor in chief
2015	TIME	"Crime Without Punishment", July 24	Photographs by Jerome Sessini	Nancy Gibbs, editor
2016	Politico	"Front Row at the Political Theater", November/ December	Photographs by Mark Peterson	Susan B. Glasser, editor in chief
2017	Pacific Standard	"Adrift", July/ August	Photographs by Francesco Zizola	Nicholas Jackson, editor in chief
2018	The New Yorker	"Faces of an Epidemic", October 30	Photographs by Philip Montgomery	David Remnick, editor
2019	W	"Cate",	Photographs by Cass Bird, Rineke Dijkstra, Dominique Issermann, Shirin Neshat, Jackie Nickerson, Sharna Osborne, Alex Prager, Viviane Sassen and Sam Taylor-Johnson	Stefano Tonchi, editor in chief
2020	National Geographic	“The Immortal Corpse”	Photographs by Lynn Johnson	Susan Goldberg, editor in chief
2021	The New Yorker	"Whose Streets"	Photographs by Isaac Scott	David Remnick, editor

=== Single-Topic Issue ===
Honors publications that have devoted a single print issue or a major digital package to the comprehensive examination of one subject No award was given in 2000 or 2001.

Year	Magazine	Article(s)	Editor(s)
1979	Progressive Architecture	"Taste in America"	John Morris Dixon, chief editor
1980	Scientific American	"The Brain"	Dennis Flanagan, editor
1981	Businessweek	"The Reindustrialization of America", by William Wolman and team "Investment Outlook 1981," by Gordon Williams and team	Lewis H. Young, editor in chief
1982	Newsweek	"What Vietnam Did to Us," by Peter Goldman, December 14	Lester Bernstein, editor
1983	IEEE Spectrum	"Technology in War and Peace," October	Donald Christiansen, editor and publisher
1984	Esquire	"Fifty Who Made the Difference," December	Phillip Moffitt, editor in chief and president
1985	American Heritage	"A Medical Picture of the United States," October/November	Byron Dobell, editor
1986	IEEE Spectrum		Donald Christiansen, editor and publisher
1987	Bulletin of the Atomic Scientists	"Chernobyl—The Emerging Story," August/September	Len Ackland, editor
1988	LIFE	"The Constitution," Fall	Patricia Ryan, managing editor
1989	Hippocrates	"Choices of the Heart," May/June	Eric W. Schrier
1990	National Geographic	"France Celebrates Its Bicentennial," July	Wilbur E. Garret, editor
1991	The American Lawyer	"Can America Enforce Its Drug Laws?" March	Steven Brill, president and editor in chief
1992	Businessweek	"The Quality Imperative," October 25	Stephen B. Shepard, editor in chief
1993	Newsweek	"How He Won: The Untold Story of Bill Clinton's Triumph," November/December	Richard M. Smith, editor in chief and president Maynard Parker, editor
1994	Health	"For Our Parents," October	Eric W. Schrier, editor in chief
1995	Discover	"The Science of Race," November	Paul Hoffman, president and editor in chief
1996	Bon Appétit	For its special collector's edition devoted to the food, culture and people of the Mediterranean, May	William J. Garry, editor in chief
1997	Scientific American	"What You Need to Know About Cancer," September	John Rennie, editor in chief
1998	The Sciences	"The Promise and Peril of Cloning," September/October	Peter G. Brown, editor
1999	The Oxford American	"Second Annual Double Issue on Southern Music," March–May	Marc Smirnoff, editor
2002	TIME	"September 11 Special Issue," September 13	James Kelly, managing editor
2003	Scientific American	"A Matter of Time," September	John Rennie, editor in chief
2004	The Oxford American	"Sixth Annual Music Issue," Summer	Marc Smirnoff, editor
2005	Newsweek	"How He Did It," November 15	Mark Whitaker, editor
2006	TIME	"An American Tragedy," September 12	James Kelly, managing editor
2007	Departures	"The Latin Issue: America 2006," October	Richard David Story, editor in chief
2008	The Virginia Quarterly Review	"South American in the 21st Century," Fall	Ted Genoways, editor Daniel Alarcón, editor
2009	Saveur	"A World of Breakfast," October	James Oseland, editor in chief
2010	Wired	"The Mystery Issue," May	Chris Anderson, editor in chief
2011	National Geographic	"Water: Our Thirsty World," April	Chris Johns, editor in chief
2012	New York	"The Encyclopedia of 9/11," September 5–12	Adam Moss, editor in chief
2013	Saveur	"The Mexico Issue," August/September	James Oseland, editor in chief
2014	Bloomberg Businessweek	"Five Years From the Brink," September 16–22	Josh Tyrangiel, editor
2015	San Francisco	"The Oakland Issue," June	Jon Steinberg, editor in chief
2016	Bloomberg Businessweek	"Code: An Essay," June 15–28	Ellen Joan Pollock, editor
2017	New York	"Eight Years in America," October 3–16	Adam Moss, editor in chief
2018	National Geographic	"Gender Revolution," January	Susan Goldberg, editor in chief
2019	Popular Science	"The Tiny Issue," Fall	Joe Brown, editor in chief
2020	The Washington Post Magazine	"Prison" (October 28)	Richard Just, editor
2021	Bloomberg Businessweek	“The Lost Year” (March 16)	Joel Weber, editor
2022	Popular Science	“The Heat Issue” (Summer)	Corinne Iozzio, editor in chief
2023	New York	“Ten Years Since Trayvon” (January 31–February 13)	David Haskell, editor in chief
2024	New York	“The War and New York” (November 20-December 3)	David Haskell, editor in chief
2025	Quanta	“The Unraveling of Space-Time” (September 25)	Samir Patel, editor in chief

=== Service Journalism ===
Previously known as Service to the Individual (1974—1985). Honors magazine journalism that serves readers’ needs and aspirations. No award was given in 1981. Known as Personal Service (1986–2021)

Year	Magazine	Article(s) and Author(s)	Editor(s)
1974	Sports Illustrated	"Women in Sport," parts one, two, and three	Roy Terrell, managing editor
1975	Esquire	"The Drinking Man's Liver," by Richard Selzer "Kidney Stone" "The Knife"	Don Erickson, editorial director
1976	Modern Medicine	"Ethics, Genetics and the Future of Man," four-part series, February 1 and 15, March 1 and 15	Paul D. Scultz
1977	Harper's Magazine	"The Anti-Social Cell"	Lewis H. Lapham, editor
1978	Newsweek	"The Graying of America," by Allan J. Mayer and with Tom Joyce, William J. Cook and Pamela Ellis Simons, February 28	Edward Kosner, editor
1979	American Journal of Nursing	For a series providing continuing education, medical developments and concern to professional expert	Thelma Schorr
1980	Saturday Review	"Children and Cancer," by Susan Schiefelbein	Carl Tucker
1982	Philadelphia	"That Certain Smile," by Carol Saline, September	Art Spikol, editor
1983	Sunset	"Fish Market Revolution," October	William Marken
1984	New York	"How Well Does Your Bank Treat You?" by Jeff and Marie Blyskal, March 7	Edward Kosner, editor and president
1985	The Washingtonian	"How to Save Your Life," by John Pekkanen, Gail Friedman, Marilyn Dickey and William O'Sullivan, March	John A. Limpert, editor
1986	Farm Journal	"Your Call for Help Can be Heard," by Elizabeth Curry Williams, February "There is Life after Farming," February "Bootstrap Plans to Beat Tough Times," April "Rescue from Suicide," by Bonnie Pollard, September "What Distressed Farmers Need Most," by Dick Braun, November	Lane Palmer, editor in chief
1987	Consumer Reports	"Life Insurance: How to Protect Your Family," by Trudy Lieberman, June, July, August	Irwin Landau, editorial director
1988	Money	"After the Crash: The Safest Places to Put Your Money Now," by Diane Harris, Eric Schurenberg and Jerry Edgerton, December	Landon Y. Jones, managing editor
1989	Good Housekeeping	"Child Care '88," September	John Mack Carter, editor in chief
1990	Consumer Reports	"Beyond Medicare," by Trudy Lieberman, June	Irwin Landau, editorial director
1991	New York	"Sparing the Child," by Michael W. Robbins, December 10	Edward Kosner, editor and president
1992	Creative Classroom	"Teaching Children About AIDS," by Lisa Feder-Feitel, January/February "How to Talk about Substance Abuse," September "Teachers Against Child Abuse," January/February 1992	Elaine Israel, editor in chief
1993	Good Housekeeping	"The Better Way," January, February, June	John Mack Carter, editor in chief
1994	Fortune	"One Man's Tough Choices on Prostate Cancer," by Tom Alexander, September 20	Marshall Loeb, managing editor
1995	SmartMoney	"Driver's Education," by Liz Comte Reisman, May "Home Truths," by Liz Comte Reisman, November "Lessons in Life," by Laura M. Holson and Liz Comte Reisman, December	Steven Swartz, editor in chief
1996	SmartMoney	"Part 1: Investing for College," by Walecia Konrad, May "Part 2: Mom, Can You Spare $100,000?," by Walecia Konrad, October	Steven Swartz, editor in chief
1997	Glamour	"Is Managed Care Good for Women's Health?" by Leslie Laurence, August "Making Managed Care Work for You," by Tessa DeCarlo, September	Ruth Whitney, editor in chief
1998	Men's Journal	"Don't tell My Heart," by Jim Thornton, April "The New Erector Set," by Jim Thornton, May "The Ache a Guy Aches: My Hernia," by Jim Thornton, December/January	Jann S. Wenner, editor in chief John Rasmus, editor
1999	Good Housekeeping	"Katie's Crusade," by Joanna Powell, October "The Stories of Three Families Left Behind," by Sondra Forsyth "The Preventable Cancer," by Lisa Collier Cool	Ellen Levine, editor in chief
2000	PC Company (renamed Smart Business for the New Economy)	"Small-Business Secret Weapons, Part I," by Bonny L. Georgia, September "Small-Business Secret Weapons, Part II," by Bonny L. Georgia, October "Small-Business Secret Weapons, Part III," by Bonny L. Georgia, November	Paul Somerson, editor in chief Wendy Taylor, editor
2001	National Geographic Adventure	"The Rules of Adventure," by Laurence Gonzales, January/February	John Rasmus, editor in chief
2002	National Geographic Adventure	"Land of the Lost," by Laurence Gonzales, November/December	John Rasmus, editor in chief
2003	Outside	"The Shape of Your Life, Part I," by Paul Scott, May "The Shape of Your Life, Part II," by Paul Scott, June "The Shape of Your Life, Part V," by Paul Scott, September	Hal Espen, editor
2004	Men's Health	"A Tale of 3 Hearts," by Peter Moore, July/August "100 Ways to Live Forever," by Adam Campbell and Brian Good "Death by Exercise," by Lou Schuler	David Zinczenko, editor in chief
2005	BabyTalk	"You Can Breastfeed!" by Kristin O'Callaghan, August	Susan Kane, editor in chief
2006	Self	"Keep Your Breasts Healthy for Life," October	Lucy S. Danziger, editor in chief
2007	Glamour	"What No One Ever Tells You About Breast Implants," by Liz Welch	Cynthia Leive, editor in chief
2008	Popular Mechanics	"Know Your Footprint: Energy," by Alex Hutchinson, June "Know Your Footprint: Water," by Alex Hutchinson, September "Know Your Footprint: Waste," by Alex Hutchinson, December	James B. Meigs, editor in chief
2009	Esquire	"Retool, Reboot, Rebuild," by Mehmet Oz, M.D. and Michael Roizen, M.D., May "Seventy-Five," by Susan Casey, May	David Granger, editor in chief
2010	New York	"For and Against Foreskin," by Chris Bonanos, Michael Idov and Hanna Rosin, October 26	Adam Moss, editor in chief
2011	Men's Health	"I Want My Prostate Back," by Laurence Roy Stains, March	David Zinczenko, editor in chief Peter Moore, editor
2012	Glamour	"The Secret That Kills Four Women a Day," by Liz Brody, editor at Large, June	Cynthia Leive, editor in chief
2013	Los Angeles	"The New Face and Body of Plastic Surgery in L.A.," October	Mary Melton, editor in chief
2014	Cosmopolitan	"Your Cosmo Guide to Contraception," September	Joanna Coles, editor in chief
2015	O, The Oprah Magazine	"Ready or Not: The Caregiver's Guide," November	Lucy Kaylin, editor in chief
2016	FamilyFun	"The Happy Family Playbook," by Jennifer King Lindley, May	Ann Hallock, editor in chief
2017	GOOD	"What Can He Really Do? What Can We Do About It?," Winter	Nancy Miller, editor in chief
2018	Cosmopolitan	"How to Run for Office," by Laura Brounstein, Meredith Bryan, Jessica Goodman, Emily C. Johnson, Tess Koman, Rachel Mosely, Rebecca Nelson and Helen Zook, November	Michele Promaulayko, editor in chief
2019	5280	"The Art of Dying Well," edited by Kasey Cordell and Lindsey B. Koehler, October	Daniel Brogan, chief executive officer and editor in chief Geoff Van Dyke, editorial director
2020	Audubon	“Start Here! Your Guide to Climate Action,” reporting and editing by Andrew Del-Colle, Breanna Draxler, Kevin Dupzyk, Rene Ebersole, Martha Harbison, Janet Marinelli, Andy McGlashen, and Hannah Waters, Fall	Jennifer Bogo, vice president, Content
2021	Marie Claire	“Invasion of Privacy: Marie Claire's Guide to Protecting Yourself Online,” edited by Megan DiTrolio, Fall	Sally Holmes, editor in chief
2022	5280	“Shattered Minds,” by Lindsey B. King, July	Geoff Van Dyke, editorial director
2023	Romper	“Best C-Section Ever,” including “What No One Tells You About C-Sections” and “Your Complete Guide to Recovering From a C-Section,” edited by Meaghan O'Connell and Melissa Dahl, February 2	Elizabeth Angell, editor in chief
2024	The New York Times Magazine	“A Vicious Cycle,” by Susan Dominus, February 5	Jake Silverstein, editor in chief
2025	Heatmap News	“Decarbonize Your Life,” September 23	Nico Lauricella, editor in chief

=== Lifestyle Journalism ===
Previously known as Special Interests (1986–2001) and Leisure Interests (2002-2021). Honors the use of print to provide practical information about recreational activities and special interests.

Year	Magazine	Article(s) and Author(s)	Editor
1986	Popular Mechanics	Popular Mechanics Woodworking Guide, November	Joe Oldham, editor in chief
1987	Sports Afield	"Getting Started: Flyfishing," January "Getting Started: Rifle Shooting," July "Getting Started: Outdoor Photography," August	Tom Paugh, editor
1988	Condé Nast Traveler	"Stop Press," by Paul Grimes, September, October, November	Harold Evans, editor in chief
1989	Condé Nast Traveler	"The Ultimate Island Finder," August "Bush Intelligence," November "Bring the Kids," December	Harold Evans, editor in chief
1990	Art & Antiques	"What's Not Hot," February	Jeffrey Schaire, editor
1991	New York	"Super Sound," by David Denby, February 19 "The Ear: Twin Tweaks," July 16 "The Ear: Speakers of the House," December 10	Edward Kosner, editor and president
1992	Sports Afield	"Gear for Deer & How to Use It," August	Tom Paugh, editor in chief
1993	Philadelphia	"Simple Pleasures," by Janet Bukovinsky, May	Eliot Kaplan, editor
1994	Outside	"At Play in the Swirly Zone," by David Quammen, April "One Animal Year," by Donald Katz, May	Lawrence J. Burke, publisher and editor in chief Mark Bryant, editor
1995	GQ	"Oy, It's Poi!" by Alan Richman, January "Feeding the Infidel," July "Play it Again, Lam," September	Arthur Cooper, editor in chief
1996	Saveur	"Don't Call it 'Cajun,'" by Gene Bourg, January/February	Dorothy Kalins, editor in chief
1997	Smithsonian	"When It Comes to Moths, Nature Pulls Out All the Stops," by Richard Conniff, February "Clyde Roper Can't Wait to be Attacked by the Giant Squid," May "Dragonflies are an Odd Combination of Beautiful Things," July	Dan Moser, editor
1998	Entertainment Weekly	"Thanks for Nothing, The Seinfeld Chronicles," (parts one, two, three, four, and five) by Kristen Baldwin and Mike Flaherty, A.J. Jacobs, Mary Kaye Schilling and Ken Tucker, May 30	James W. Seymore, Jr., managing editor
1999	PC Computing	"Undocumented Internet Secrets," November	Paul Somerson, vice president and editor in chief
2000	I.D.	"Leaving Las Vegas," September/October	Chee Pearlman, former editor in chief
2001	The New Yorker	"The Sports Issue," August 21 & 28	David Remnick, editor
2002	Vogue	"Caviar Conundrum," by Jeffrey Steingarten, March "Salt Chic," July "High Steaks," September	Anna Wintour, editor in chief
2003	National Geographic Adventure	"Wild in the Parks," by Jim Gorman and Tim Cahill, May	John Rasmus, editor in chief
2004	Consumer Reports	"Veterinary Care Without the Bite," by Jeff Blyskal, July	Julia Kagan, vice president and editorial director
2005	Sports Illustrated	"2004 Olympic Preview," August 2	Terry McDonell, managing editor
2006	Golf Magazine	"The New Way to Putt," October	David M. Clarke, editor
2007	O, The Oprah Magazine	"Reading: A Love Story," July	Oprah Winfrey, Founder and editorial director, Amy Gross, editor in chief
2008	New York	"Cartography: The Complete Road Map to New York City Street Food," by Michael Idov and Rob Patronite, June 25	Adam Moss, editor in chief
2009	Esquire	"The Esquire Almanac of Steak," September	David Granger, editor in chief
2010	New York	"The Great New York Neoclassical Neapolitan Pizza Revolution," by Rob Patronite and Robin Raisefeld with Michael Idov, July 20–27	Adam Moss, editor in chief
2011	Men's Journal	"Five Meals Every Man Should Master," by Daniel Duane, Photographs by Marcus Nilsson, August	Jann S. Wenner, editor in chief Will Dana, editorial director Brad Wieners, editor
2012	Saveur	"Italian America," by Dana Bowen, Frank Castronovo, Lou Di Palo, Frank Falcinelli, Greg Ferro, John Mariani, Rina Oh, James Oseland, Marne Setton and Jane and Michael Stern, December	James Oseland, editor in chief
2013	Wired	"How to Be a Geek Dad," June	Chris Anderson, editor in chief
2014	O, The Oprah Magazine	"Hair Extravaganza!," September	Oprah Winfrey, Founder and editorial director Lucy Kaylin, editor in chief
2015	Backpacker	"The Complete Guide to Fire," edited by Casey Lyons, October	Dennis Lewon, editor in chief
2016	Eater	"The Eater Guide to Surviving Disney World," August 26 at eater.com	Amanda Kludt, editor in chief
2017	Eater	"The Eater Guide to Paris," by Eater Staff, October 19 at eater.com	Amanda Kludt, editor in chief
2018	Texas Monthly	"The Golden Age of BBQ," by Daniel Vaughn, June	Tim Taliaferro, editor in chief
2019	New York	"How to Be an Artist," by Jerry Saltz, November 26 – December 9	Adam Moss, editor in chief
2020	Bon Appétit	“Absolutely Perfect,” by Alex Beggs, November	Adam Rapoport, editor in chief
2021	New York	Three articles from “Biography of a Building” by Matthew Sedacca: “Graham Court: The Gilded Age Rental,” April 27-May 10, “One Fifth: The Downtown Co-op of All Downtown Co-ops,” November 9-22, and “Villa Charlotte Brontë: A Cliffside Co-op in the Bronx,” December 21, 2020-January 3, 2021	David Haskell, editor in chief
2022	Eater	“Filling Up,” edited by Lesley Suter, May 2	Amanda Kludt, editor in chief
2023	New York	“The Year of the Nepo Baby,” December 19, 2022–January 1, 2023	David Haskell, editor in chief
2024	Philadelphia	“All Hail the Hoagie,” February	Edited by Bradford Pearson
2025	Food & Wine	“The City That Rice Built,” article by Jeff Gordinier and George McCalman, September; video directed by Fabienne Toback and Karis Jagger, August 20 at foodandwine.com; and social media @foodandwine on Instagram, September 23	Hunter Lewis, editor in chief Edited by Karen Shimizu

=== Best Social media ===
Honors the outstanding use of social accounts by magazine websites and digital-only magazines. (Called Social Media 2018-2021) (No award 2022-2024)

Year	Title	Article(s) and Author(s)	Editor
2018	SELF	facebook.com/selfmagazine; instagram.com/selfmagazine; SELF on Snapchat; Team SELF Facebook Group	Carolyn Kylstra, editor in chief
2019	Bon Appétit	facebook.com/itsalivewithbrad; instagram.com/basically; instagram.com/bonappetitmag; instagram.com/healthy_ish; twitter.com/bonappetit	Adam Rapoport, editor in chief Rachel Karten, senior social media manager
2020	National Geographic	“Wildlife Tourism” @natgeo on Facebook, Instagram and Twitter @nationalgeographic on Reddit National Geographic Society on LinkedIn	Susan Goldberg, editor in chief
2021	ProPublica	“Grace: A Failure in Michigan’s Juvenile Justice System” @propublica on Instagram and Twitter @jodiscohen on Twitter	Stephen Engelberg, editor in chief
2025	InStyle	“We’re All Just Living in Katseye’s World” @instylemagazine on Instagram, and @instyle on TikTok and YouTube, September 25; “Imagemaker Awards” @instylemagazine on Instagram, October 24 and October 25, and @instyle on TikTok, October 24, October 26 and October 29; and “InStyle x Alexis Bittar” @instylemagazine on Instagram, August 21, August 22, September 7, September 8 and September 16	Sally Holmes, editor in chief and general manager

=== Podcasting ===
Honors the outstanding use of audio content by magazine websites and digital-only magazines.

Year	Title	Article(s) and Author(s)	Editor
2010	Tablet Magazine	Remembrance Day by George Warner, The Queens of Bollywood by Eric Molinsky, Blessed Bluegrass by Jon Kalish	Alana Newhouse, editor-in-chief, Julie Subrin, executive producer, audio, Sara Ivry, podcast host
2011	Poetry	Poetry Magazine Podcast	Christian Wiman, editor; Don Share, senior editor; Curtis Fox, producer; Ed Herrmann, sound recordist
2019	Slate	Three episodes of "Slow Burn":"Deal or No Deal," August 8, "Tell-All," September 18, and "Move On," October 17	Julia Turner, editor in chief
2020	The New York Times Magazine	Three episodes of “1619,” hosted by Nikole Hannah-Jones: “The Fight for a True Democracy,” August 23, “The Economy That Slavery Built,” August 30, and “The Birth of American Music,” September 6	Jake Silverstein, editor in chief
2021	The Intercept, Invisible Institute and Topic Studios	Three episodes of “Somebody,” hosted by Shapearl Wells: “Who Shot Courtney Copeland?,” March 31, “The Nurse,” April 7, and “The Police,” April 14	Betsy Reed, editor in chief, The Intercept
2022	Pineapple Street Studios	Two episodes of “The 11^{th},” hosted by Hanif Abdurraqib: “Time Machine: The Score (Side A),” and “Time Machine: The Score (Side B),” September 11	Leila Day, senior editor
2023	Gimlet Media for Spotify	Three episodes of “Stolen: Surviving St. Michael’s,” hosted by Connie Walker: “Episode 1: The Police Officer and the Priest,” May 17, “Episode 3: Don't Play With This,” May 24, and “Episode 4: Not a Place to Be,” May 31	Lydia Polgreen and Nicole Beemsterboer, managing directors, Gimlet Media
2024	Invisible Institute With USG Audio	Three episodes of “You Didn’t See Nothin,” hosted by Yohance Lacour: “Episode 1: Young Black Male,” “Episode 2: Holler If Ya Hear Me” and “Episode 3: Heartz of Men,” February 15	Andrew Fan, executive director, Invisible Institute
2025	The Center for Public Integrity with Reveal and Mother Jones from PRX	Three episodes of “40 Acres and a Lie,” hosted by Al Letson: “Part 1,” June 15, “Part 2,” June 22, and “Part 3,” June 29	Clara Jeffery, editor in chief, Mother Jones Cynthia Rodriguez, senior editor, Reveal

=== Video ===
Honors the outstanding use of video by magazines published on digital platforms. Divided into two categories in 2019: "News and Opinion"-Honors coverage of politics, business, technology and entertainment- and "Service and Life Style" – Honors coverage of fashion, food, travel and design.

Year	Title	Article(s) and Author(s)	Editor
2010	Yale Environment 360	Leveling Appalachia: The Legacy of Mountaintop Removal Mining	Roger Cohn, editor Chad Stevens, filmmaker
2011	The Oxford American	"SoLost" Series	Warwick Sabin, publisher Dave Anderson, videographer
2012	The New York Times Magazine	"My Family's Experiment in Extreme Schooling," by Julie Dressner, Shayla Harris and Clifford J. Levy	Hugo Lindgren, editor in chief
2013	Mother Jones'	"Full Secret Video of Private Romney Fundraiser," September 18	Monika Bauerlein and Clara Jeffery, editors David Corn, Washington bureau chief James West, producer
2014	Glamour	"Confronting Cancer: BRCA1 and BRCA2 Gene Mutations," October 9 "Recovery: Meds. And Love," October 23 "Life Post-Surgery: Back on Stage," October 30, from "Screw You Cancer" series	Cynthia Leive, editor in chief
2015	Vice News	"The Islamic State," by Medyan Dairieh, August 15 at vice.com	Jason Mojica, editor in chief Kevin Sutcliffe, executive producer
2016	Vice News	"Selfie Soldiers: Russia's Army Checks In to Ukraine," June 16 at vicenews.com	Jason Mojica, editor in chief
2017	New York with Narrative 4	"Guns & Empathy," December 26 at nymag.com	Adam Moss, editor in chief
2018	TIME and Mic	"Life After Addiction," video by Aja Harris and Paul Moakley, November 8 at time.com	Edward Felsenthal, editor in chief
2019	Topic	"Black 14," directed by Darius Clark Monroe, March 6	Anna Holmes, editorial director
2019	Topic	"Noodle School," directed by Jia Li, September 10	Anna Holmes, editorial director
2020	Bon Appétit with Condé Nast Entertainment	Three episodes of “Gourmet Makes” with Claire Saffitz: “Pastry Chef Attempts to Make Gourmet Ferrero Rocher,” February 12, “Pastry Chef Attempts to Make Gourmet Hot Pockets,” September 25, and “Pastry Chef Attempts to Make Gourmet Ruffles,” October 22	Adam Rapoport, editor in chief, Bon Appétit Matthew Duckor, vice president, Head of Programming, Lifestyle and Style, Condé Nast Entertainment
2021	The New Yorker	“Quiet No More,” directed by Eléonore Hamelin, June 5	David Remnick, editor
2022	The New Yorker	“A Reporter’s Video From Inside the Capitol Siege,” by Luke Mogelson, January 17	David Remnick, editor
2023	Mother Jones	“Failure to Protect,” reported by Samantha Michaels, produced by Mark Helenowski, August 9 on YouTube	Clara Jeffery, editor in chief
2024	Business Insider	“How Dogs Are Trained to Attack US Prisoners,” by Hannah Beckler, Olivia Nemec, Robert Leslie, Noah Lewis and Erica Berenstein, October 10	Nicholas Carlson, global editor in chief
2025	The New Yorker	“Incident,” by Bill Morrison, August 28	David Remnick, editor Paul Moakley, executive producer

=== Public Interest ===
Known as Public Service (1970–1985). Honors magazine journalism that illuminates issues of national importance. No award was given in 1973.

Year	Title	Article(s)	Author(s)	Editor
1970	LIFE	"Fortas: A Question of Ethics"	William Lambert	Ralph Graves, managing editor
1971	The Nation	"The Wired Nation" "The Cops Hit the Jackpot"	Ralph Lee Smith; Joseph C. Goulden	
1972	Philadelphia	"The River Pirates "		
1974	Scientific American	"Life and Death in Medicine"	Kerr L. White	Dennis Flanagan, editor
1975	Consumer Reports	"Is the Water Safe to Drink? (three-part series)"	Irwin Landau	Irwin Landau, editorial director
1976	Businessweek	"The Corporate Woman: Up the Ladder, Finally "	Irene Pave	Lewis H. Young, editor in chief
1977	Philadelphia	"The Forgotten Children"	Loretta Schwartz	Alan Halpern, editor
1978	Mother Jones'	"Pinto Madness"	Mark Dowie	Jeffrey Klein, editor
1979	New West	"Hell on Wheels"	Moira Johnson	Jon Carroll
1980	Texas Monthly	"Why Teachers Can’t Teach"	Gene Lyons	William Broyles, editor
1981	Reader's Digest	"The Murder of Robbie Wayne, Age 6" "Marijuana Alert II: More of the Grim Story"	Mary Jane Chambers; Peggy Mann	Edward T. Thompson, editor in chief
1982	The Atlantic	"The Education of David Stockman (December)"	William Greider	William Whitworth, editor
1983	Foreign Affairs	"Nuclear Weapons and the Atlantic Alliance (Spring)"	McGeorge Bundy, George F. Kennan, Robert S. McNamara and Gerard C. Smith	William P. Bundy, editor
1984	The New Yorker	"Breaking the Spell"	George Kennan	William Shawn, editor
1985	Washingtonian	"Where Have All the Warriors Gone?"	Nick Kotz and Nancy B. Nathan and Cathryn Donohoe	John A. Limpert, editor
1986	Science 81	"Technology for Peace: High-Tech Vigilance" "Technology for Peace: The Politics of Mistrust Technology for Peace: The Inspectors"	R. Jeffrey Smith; Roger Bingham Carl Posey	Allan L. Hammond, editor
1987	Money	"Inside the Billion-Dollar Business of Blood"	Andrea Rock	Marshall Loeb, managing editor, Landon Y. Jones, executive editor
1988	The Atlantic	"The Morning After"	Peter G. Peterson	William Whitworth, editor
1989	California	"Halcion Madness; Halcion: Prescription for Trouble?"	Cindy Ehrlich	B.K. Moran, editorial director
1990	Southern Exposure	"Don’t Count Your Chickens"; "Inside the Slaughterhouse"; "The Fox Guarding the Hen House"	Barry Yeoman, Barbara Goldoftas, Tom Devine	Eric Bates, managing editor
1991	Family Circle	"Toxic Nightmare on Main Street"	Stephanie Abarbanel	Jacqueline Leo, editor in chief
1992	Glamour	"Teenage and Pregnant: Where are the Doctors Who Will Do Abortions?" "A Town Held Hostage"	Le Ann Schreiber; Francis Wilkinson	Ruth Whitney, editor in chief
1993	The Family Therapy Networker	"Whatever Happened to Community Mental Health?—Revising the Dream"; Steering through the Storm Making House Calls"	Mary Sykes Wylie; James Carlin, Laura M. Markowitz	Dr. Richard Simon, editor
1994	Philadelphia	"Less Than One Percent; Floxin Follow-Up; Floxin Update"	Stephen Fried	Eliot Kaplan, editor
1995	The New Republic	"No Exit; She’s Baaack!"	Elizabeth McCaughey	Martin Peretz, editor in chief and chairman, Andrew Sullivan, editor
1996	Texas Monthly	"Not What the Doctor Ordered"	Mimi Swartz	Gregory Curtis, editor
1997	Fortune	"How Bill Ruckelshaus is Taking on the New York Mob"; "Carting Away New York City’s Garbage Cartel"	Richard Behar	John Huey, managing editor
1998	The Atlantic	"The Computer Delusion"	Todd Oppenheimer	William Whitworth, editor
1999	TIME	"Corporate Welfare"; "Paying a Price for Polluters"; "The Empire of the Pigs"	Donald L. Bartlett and James B. Steele	Walter Isaacson, managing editor
2000	The New Yorker	"The Demon in the Freezer"	Richard Preston	David Remnick, editor
2001	TIME	"Big Money & Politics: How the Little Guy Gets Crunched"; "Soaked by Congress"; "Throwing the Game"	Donald L. Bartlett and James B. Steele	Walter Isaacson, managing editor
2002	The Atlantic	"Bystanders to Genocide"	Samantha Power	Michael Kelly, editor
2003	The Atlantic	"The Fifty-First State?"	James Fallows	Cullen Murphy, managing editor
2004	The New Yorker	"Lunch with the Chairman"; "Selective Intelligence"; "The Stovepipe"	Seymour M. Hersh	David Remnick, editor
2005	The New Yorker	"Torture at Abu Ghraib"; "Chain of Command"; "The Gray Zone"	Seymour Hersh	David Remnick, editor
2006	The New Yorker	"The Climate of Man: Part 1"; "The Climate of Man: Part II"; "The Climate of Man: Part III"	Elizabeth Kolbert	David Remnick, editor
2007	Vanity Fair	"Rules of Engagement"	William Langewiesche	Graydon Carter, editor
2008	The Nation	"How Specialist Town Lost His Benefits"; Specialist Town Takes His Case to Washington"	Joshua Kors	Katrina vanden Heuvel, editor and publisher
2009	Bicycling	"Broken"	David Darlington	Loren Mooney, editor in chief
2010	The New Yorker	"The Cost Conundrum"	Atul Gawande	David Remnick, editor
2011	The New Yorker	"Letting Go"	Atul Gawande	David Remnick, editor
2012	The New Yorker	"The Invisible Army"	Sarah Stillman	David Remnick, editor
2013	Texas Monthly	"Mothers, Sisters, Daughters, Wives"	Mimi Swartz	Jake Silverstein, editor in chief
2014	TIME	"Bitter Pill: Why Medical Bills Are Killing Us"	Steven Brill	Rick Stengel, managing editor
2015	Pacific Standard	"Why Women Aren't Welcome on the Internet"	Amanda Hess	Maria Streshinsky, editor in chief
2016	BuzzFeed	"The New American Slavery," July 24, and "All You Americans Are Fired," December 1 at buzzfeed.com	Jessica Garrison, Ken Bensinger and Jeremy Singer-Vine	Ben Smith, editor in chief
2017	The New York Times Magazine	"Worlds Apart," June 12	Nikole Hannah-Jones	Jake Silverstein, editor in chief
2018	The New Yorker	"Abuses of Power," October 23 print issue, "Weighing the Costs of Speaking Out About Harvey Weinstein," October 27 at newyorker.com, and "Harvey Weinstein’s Army of Spies," November 6 at newyorker.com	Ronan Farrow	David Remnick, editor
2019	The New Yorker	"No Refuge," January 15	Sarah Stillman	David Remnick, editor
2020	The New York Times Magazine	"The 1619 Project," August 14 online at nytimes.com/magazine and August 18 in print	Nikole Hannah-Jones and other contributors	Jake Silverstein, editor in chief
2021	ProPublica	"The Black American Amputation Epidemic," May 19, and "Tethered to the Machine," December 15	Lizzie Presser	Stephen Engelberg, editor in chief
2022	The New York Times Magazine	“Hidden Files Bare Military Failures in Deadly Strikes,” December 19 on Page One of The New York Times, and “The Human Toll of America’s Air Wars,” January 2, 2022	Azmat Khan	Jake Silverstein, editor in chief
2023	Glamour	“The Time to Pass Paid Leave Is Now” and “28 Days”	Natasha Pearlman and Natasha Pearlman, Ruhama Wolle	Samantha Barry, editor in chief
2024	The New York Times Magazine	“Alone and Exploited, Migrant Children Work Brutal Jobs Across the U.S.,” February 25 at nytimes.com/magazine, “As Migrant Children Were Put to Work, U.S. Ignored Warnings,” April 17 at nytimes.com/magazine, and “Lost in Dreamland,” September 24	Hannah Dreier	Jake Silverstein, editor in chief Edited by Ilena Silverman and Kirsten Danis
2025	ProPublica	“The Year After a Denied Abortion,” February 15; “Abortion Bans Have Delayed Emergency Medical Care. In Georgia, Experts Say This Mother’s Death Was Preventable,” September 16; and “A Pregnant Teenager Died After Trying to Get Care in Three Visits to Texas Emergency Rooms,” November 1	Stacy Kranitz and Kavitha Surana; Kavitha Surana; and Lizzie Presser and Kavitha Surana	Stephen Engelberg, editor in chief Edited by Alexandra Zayas

=== Reporting ===
Previously known as Reporting Excellence (1970–1980) and New Reporting in 1988. Honors reporting excellence as exemplified by one article or a series of articles.

Year	Title	Article(s)	Author(s)	Editor
1970	The New Yorker	"Annals of Politics" (parts one and two) "Casualties of War"	Richard Harris; Daniel Lang	
1971	The Atlantic	"Soldiers"	Ward Just	
1972	The Atlantic	"The 8,000,000: Report from China"	Ross Terrill	
1973	New York	"The Landlords of Hell’s Bedroom"; "The Old Man in the Bronx"	Gail Sheehy	
1974	The New Yorker	"Annals of Industry: Casualties of the Workplace" "Reporter at Large: The Plundered Past"	Paul Brodeur; John McPhee, Karl E. Meyer	William Shawn, editor
1975	The New Yorker	"Supertanker"	Noel Mostert	William Shawn, editor Hoyt Spellman, director of marketing
1976	Audubon	"Dr. Strangelove Builds a Canal" "Song of the Seal"	Alvin Josephy; George Rieger	Les Line, editor in chief
1977	Audubon	"Cheap Chemicals and Dumb Luck"	Curtis K. Stadtfeld	Les Line, editor in chief
1978	The New Yorker	"For a six-part series on Alaska (May 2 & 9, June 20 & 27, July 4 & 11)"	John McPhee	William Shawn, editor
1979	Texas Monthly	A three-part series on life in three disparate areas of Texas (parts one, two, and three)	Richard West	William Broyles, editor
1980	Mother Jones'	"The Corporate Crime of the Century"	Mark Dowie	Zina Klapper
1981	National Journal	"Money Makes the World Go Round: But What If It Can’t Any More?"	Robert J. Samuelson	Richard S. Frank, editor
1982	Washingtonian	"The Saving of Mr. President"	John Pekkanen	John A. Limpert, editor
1983	Institutional Investor	"Drysdale: What Really Happened?"	Chris Welles	Gilbert E. Kaplan
1984	Vanity Fair	"When Memory Goes"	Francine du Plessix Gray	Leo Lerman, editor in chief
1985	Texas Monthly	"The Man in the Black Hat" (parts one and two)	Paul Burka	Gregory Curtis, editor
1986	Rolling Stone	"The Plague Years"	David Black	Jann S. Wenner, editor and publisher
1987	LIFE	"The Liberation of Lolly and Gronky"	Anne Fadiman	Judith Daniels, managing editor
1988	Washingtonian and Baltimore	"Life and Death on the Fast Track"	Steven D. Kaye; Ramsey Flynn	John A. Limpert, editor Stan Heuisler, editor
1989	The New Yorker	"Tehran Summer"	Robin Wright	Robert Gottlieb, editor
1990	The New Yorker	"Beyond the Mountains" (parts one, two, and three)	Mark Danner	Robert Gottlieb, editor
1991	The New Yorker	"Deal of the Year"	Connie Bruck	Robert Gottlieb, editor
1992	The New Republic	"Highway to Hell"; "Rolls-Royce Revolutionaries"; "Back to the Hills"	Michael Kelly	Martin Peretz, editor and chief and chairman
1993	IEEE Spectrum	"Iraq and the Bomb" "Halting Proliferation"	Glenn Zorpette; John A. Adam	Donald Christiansen, editor and publisher
1994	The New Yorker	"Remembering Satan, Part I (May 17)"; "Remembering Satan, Part II (May 24)"	Lawrence Wright	Tina Brown, editor
1995	The Atlantic	"Reefer Madness: Marijuana and the Law"	Eric Schlosser	William Whitworth, editor
1996	The New Yorker	"The Politics of Perception"	Connie Bruck	Tina Brown, editor
1997	Outside	"Into Thin Air"	Jon Krakauer	Lawrence J. Burke, publisher and editor in chief Mark Bryant, editor
1998	Rolling Stone	"The True Story of John/Joan"	John Colapinto	Jann S. Wenner, editor and publisher Robert Love, managing editor
1999	Newsweek	"Clinton and the Intern"; "The Secret War"; "The Tripp Trap?"	Michael Isikoff and Evan Thomas	Richard M. Smith, editor in chief and chairman Mark Whitaker, editor
2000	Vanity Fair	"Madness Visible" "Forensics of War"	Janine di Giovanni; Sebastian Junger	Graydon Carter, editor in chief
2001	Esquire	"The Perfect Fire"	Sean Flynn	David Granger, editor in chief
2002	The Atlantic	"The Crash of Egypt Air 990"	William Langewiesche	Michael Kelly, editor
2003	The New Yorker	"In the Party of God, Part I (October 14 & 21)"; "In the Party of God, Part II (October 28)"	Jeffrey Goldberg	David Remnick, editor
2004	Rolling Stone	"The Killer Elite, Part 1"; "The Killer Elite, Part 2: From Hell to Baghdad"; "The Killer Elite, Part 3: The Battle for Baghdad"	Evan Wright	Wenner, editor and publisher Ed Needham, managing editor
2005	The New Yorker	"Dying in Darfur"	Samantha Power	David Remnick, editor
2006	Rolling Stone	"The Man Who Sold the War"	James Bamford	Jann S. Wenner, editor and publisher Will Dana, managing editor
2007	Esquire	"The School"	C.J. Chivers	David Granger, editor in chief
2008	National Geographic	China's Instant Cities"	Peter Hessler	Chris Johns, editor in chief
2009	The New York Times	"Right at the Edge"	Dexter Filkins	Gerald Marzorati, editor in chief
2010	The New York Times	"The Deadly Choices at Memorial"	Sheri Fink	Gerald Marzorati, editor
2011	Harper's Magazine	"The Guatanamo ‘Suicides’"	Scott Horton	Roger D. Hodge, editor
2012	The New Yorker	"The Apostate"	Lawrence Wright	David Remnick, editor
2013	GQ	"18 Tigers, 17 Lions, 8 Bears, 3 Cougars, 2 Wolves, 1 Baboon, 1 Macaque, and 1 Man Dead in Ohio"	Chris Heath	Jim Nelson, editor in chief
2014	The New York Times	"The Dream Boat"	Luke Mogelson	Hugo Lindgren, editor in chief
2015	GQ	"Inside the Iron Closet"	Jeff Sharlet	Jim Nelson, editor in chief
2016	Matter	"My Nurses Are Dead, and I Don't Know If I'm Already Infected"	Joshua Hammer	Mark Lotto, editor in chief
2017	Mother Jones	"My Four Months as a Private Prison Guard"	Shane Bauer	Clara Jeffery, editor in chief
2018	The New York Times Magazine	"The Uncounted," November 19	Azmat Khan and Anand Gopal	Jake Silverstein, editor in chief
2019	The New Yorker	"Shallow Graves," December 24 & 31	Ben Taub	David Remnick, editor
2020	The New York Times Magazine in partnership with ProPublica	"False Witness," December 8	Pamela Colloff	Jake Silverstein, editor in chief, The New York Times Magazine Stephen Engelberg, editor in chief, ProPublica
2021	The New Yorker	"The Plague Year," December 28 on newyorker.com, January 4 & 11 print issue	Lawrence Wright	David Remnick, editor
2022	The New York Times Magazine	"The Collapse," December 10, 2021 on nytimes.com, December 19, 2021 print issue	Matthieu Aikins	Jake Silverstein, editor in chief
2023	The New York Times Magazine	"The Battle for Baby L.,” November 20, 2022 print issue	Rozina Ali	Jake Silverstein, editor in chief
2024	Pro Publica with The Texas Tribune	"Someone Tell Me What to Do” December 5, 2023	Lomi Kriel and Lexi Churchill, ProPublica and The Texas Tribune, and Jinitzail Hernández, The Texas Tribune	Stephen Engelberg, editor-in-chief, ProPublica and Sewell Chan, editor-in-chief, The Texas Tribune
2025	The Atlantic	"American Cowardice," March	Jamie Thompson	Jeffrey Goldberg, editor in chief Edited by Scott Stossel

=== Feature Writing ===
Honors original, stylish storytelling.

Year	Magazine	Article(s)	Author(s)	Editor
1988	The Atlantic	"The Man Who Loves Only Numbers"	Paul Hoffman	William Whitworth, editor
1989	Esquire	"The Transformation of Johnny Spain"	Chip Brown	Lee Eisenberg, editor in chief
1990	The Washingtonian	"Like Something the Lord Made"	Katie McCabe	John A. Limpert, editor
1991	U.S. News & World Report	"Vietnam Story"	Joseph L. Galloway	Merrill McLoughlin, Michael Ruby, co-editors
1992	Sports Illustrated	"Shadow of a Nation"	Gary Smith	John Papanek, managing editor
1993	The New Yorker	"Whose Art Is It?"	Jane Kramer	Tina Brown, editor
1994	Harper's Magazine	"The Last Shot"	Darcy Frey	Lewis H. Lapham, editor
1995	GQ	"The Abortionist"	Tom Junod	Arthur Cooper, editor in chief
1996	GQ	"The Rapist Says He’s Sorry"	Tom Junod	Arthur Cooper, editor in chief
1997	Sports Illustrated	"Crime and Punishment"	Gary Smith	Mark Mulvoy, editor Bill Colson, managing editor
1998	Harper's Magazine	"Driving Mr. Albert"	Michael Paterniti	Lewis H. Lapham, editor
1999	The American Scholar	"Exiting Nirvana"	Clara Claiborne	Anne Fadiman, editor
2000	Sports Illustrated	"Moment of Truth"	Gary Smith	Bill Colson, managing editor
2001	Rolling Stone	"The Weasel, Twelve Monkeys and the Shrub"	David Foster Wallace	Jann S. Wenner, editor and publisher Robert Love, managing editor
2002	The Atlantic	"Moonrise"	Penny Wolfson	Michael Kelly, editor
2003	Harper's Magazine	"Horseman, Pass By"	John Jeremiah Sullivan	Lewis H. Lapham, editor
2004	The New Yorker	"The Marriage Cure"	Katherine Boo	David Remnick, editor
2005	Esquire	"Home"	Chris Jones	David Granger, editor in chief
2006	The American Scholar	"Genome Tome"	Priscilla Long	Robert Wilson, editor
2007	GQ	"The Other Side of Hate"	Andrew Corsello	Jim Nelson, editor in chief
2008	Atlanta	"You Have Thousands of Angels Around You"	Paige Williams	Rebecca Burns, editor in chief
2009	Esquire	"The Things That Carried Him"	Chris Jones	David Granger, editor in chief
2010	Texas Monthly	"Still Life"	Skip Hollandsworth	Evan Smith, president and editor in chief Jake Silverstein, editor
2011	Los Angeles	"The End"	Ben Ehrenreich	Mary Melton, editor
2012	Esquire	"Joplin!"	Luke Dittrich	David Granger, editor in chief
2013	Texas Monthly	"The Innocent Man: Part I"; "The Innocent Man: Part II"	Pamela Colloff	Jake Silverstein, editor in chief
2014	The New Yorker	"A Loaded Gun"	Patrick Radden Keefe	David Remnick, editor Pamela Maffei McCarthy, deputy editor
2015	Atavist	"Love and Ruin"	James Verini	Evan Ratliff, editor in chief
2016	The New Yorker	"The Really Big One"	Kathryn Schulz	David Remnick, editor
2017	The New York Times Magazine	"I Have No Choice but to Keep Looking"	Jennifer Percy	Jake Silverstein, editor in chief
2018	GQ	"A Most American Terrorist: The Making of Dylann Roof," September	Rachel Kaadzi Ghansah	Jim Nelson, editor in chief
2019	The New Yorker	"A Theory of Relativity," April 30	Elif Batuman	David Remnick, editor
2020	The New York Times Magazine	"The Schoolteacher and the Genocide," August 11	Sarah A. Topol	Jake Silverstein, editor in chief
2021	Runner's World	"Twelve Minutes and a Life," June 18	Mitchell S. Jackson	Bill Strickland, enthusiast group editorial director
2022	The Atlantic	"Twenty Years Gone," September 2021	Jennifer Senior	Jeffrey Goldberg, editor in chief
2023	Pro Publica and Milwaukee Journal Sentinel	"The Landlord and the Tenant," November 16, 2021	Raquel Rutledge, Milwaukee Journal Sentinel, and Ken Armstrong, ProPublica	Stephen Engelberg, editor in chief, ProPublica George Stanley, editor, Milwaukee Journal Sentinel
2024	The New York Times Magazine	“What Can't Be Unseen,” April 23	Jay Kirk	Jake Silverstein, editor in chief Edited by Jessica Lustig
2025	The New York Times Magazine	“The Deserter,” September 22	Sarah A. Topol	Jake Silverstein, editor in chief Edited by Mark Jannot

=== Reviews and Criticism ===
Honors excellence in criticism of art, books, movies, television, theater, music, dance, food, dining, fashion, products and the like by recognizing the knowledge, persuasiveness and original voice that the critic brings to his or her reviews. Not awarded 2011-2022.

Year	Magazine	Article(s)	Editor(s)
2000	Esquire	N/A	N/A
2001	The New Yorker	N/A	N/A
2002	Harper's Magazine	N/A	N/A
2003	Vanity Fair	N/A	N/A
2004	Esquire	N/A	N/A
2005	The New Yorker	N/A	N/A
2006	Harper's Magazine	N/A	N/A
2007	The Nation	N/A	N/A
2008	The Atlantic	N/A	N/A
2009	The New Yorker	N/A	N/A
2010	The New Yorker	N/A	N/A
2023	The New York Review of Books	“‘She’s Capital!,’” by Namwali Serpell, July 21	Emily Greenhouse, editor
2024	The Atlantic	Three articles by Sophie Gilbert: “The Death of the Sex Scene,” February 22 at theatlantic.com, “Porn Set Women Up From the Start,” July 20 at theatlantic.com, and “Madonna Forever,” November	Jeffrey Goldberg, editor in chief Edited by Jane Kim and Ann Hulbert
2025	The New Yorker	Three articles by Parul Sehgal: “Divorce Story,” August 12, “The Mystery of Pain,” September 16, and “Origin Story,” October 21	David Remnick, editor Edited by Namara Smith

=== Columns and Essays ===
Honors political and social commentary; news analysis; and reviews and criticism. Called Columns and Commentary (2002-2021). Incorporated into Essays and Criticism in 2022. Columns and Essays starting in 2023.

Year	Magazine	Article(s)	Author(s)	Editor
2002	New York	"Russert to Judgment"; "Sullivan’s Travels"; "The Stupids"	Michael Wolff	Caroline Miller, editor in chief
2003	The Nation	"God Changes Everything"; "Backlash Babies"; "As Miss World Turns"	Katha Pollitt	Katrina vanden Heuvel, editor
2004	New York	"Live from Doha"; "My Big Fat Questions"; "Al Jazeera’s Edge"	Michael Wolff	Caroline Miller, editor in chief
2005	National Journal	"On Same-Sex Marriage, Bush Failed the Public and Himself"; "Fix the McCain-Feingold Law. Oops—Can I Say That?"; "Good Plan, Republicans. But It Didn’t Work in Britain"	Jonathan Rauch	Charles Green, editor
2006	The New Yorker	"Landmarks"; "Mired"; "Bah Humbug"	Hendrik Hertzberg	David Remnick, editor
2007	Vanity Fair	"Childhood’s End"; "The Vietnam Syndrome"; "Oriana Fallaci and the Art of Interview"	Christopher Hitchens	Graydon Carter, editor
2008	Rolling Stone	"Worse Than Bush"; "My Favorite Nut Job"; "Obama’s Moment"	Matt Taibbi	Jann S. Wenner, editor and publisher Will Dana, managing editor
2009	Automobile	"They Fought the Laws (of Supply and Demand), and the Laws Won"; "Lease Me to the Moon: The Rise and Fall of Consumer Finance?"; "Bailout Time for the Big Three"; "None Dare Call Them Republicans"	Jamie Kitman	Jean Jennings, president and editor in chief
2010	Newsweek	"Worthwhile Canadian Initiative"; "The Way Out of Afghanistan"; "Theocracy and Its Discontents"	Fareed Zakaria	Jon Meacham, editor
2011	Vanity Fair	"Topic of Cancer"; "Unanswerable Prayers"; "Miss Manners and the Big C"	Christopher Hitchens	Graydon Carter, editor
2012	Vanity Fair	"When the King Saved God"; "Unspoken Truths"; "From Abbottabad to Worse"	Christopher Hitchens	Graydon Carter, editor
2013	Slate	"It’s Not About the Law, Stupid"; "The Supreme Court’s Dark Vision of Freedom"; "Where Is The Liberal Outrage?"	Dahlia Lithwick	David Plotz, editor in chief
2014	The New Yorker	"Shark Week"; "Difficult Women"; "Private Practice"	Emily Nussbaum	Remnick, editor; Pamela Maffei McCarthy, deputy editor
2015	New York	"Zombies on the Walls: Why Does So Much New Abstraction Look the Same?," "Taking in Jeff Koons, Creator and Destroyer of Worlds," "Post-Macho God: Matisse's Cut-Outs Are World-Historically Gorgeous"	Jerry Saltz	Adam Moss, editor in chief
2016	The Intercept	"A Visit to the Sweat Lodge," July 16, "Santa Muerte, Full of Grace," August 24, and "Stop Sending Me Jonathan Franzen Novels," October 6, at theintercept.com	Barrett Brown	Betsy Reed, editor in chief
2017	Harper's Magazine	"Bird in a Cage," March, "The Ideology of Isolation," July, and "Giantess," September	Rebecca Solnit	Christopher Cox, editor, for March Ellen Rosenbush, editor, for July James Marcus, editor, for September
2018	New York	"Why the Harvey Weinstein Sexual-Harassment Allegations Didn’t Come Out Until Now," October 5, "Your Reckoning. And Mine.," November 12, and "This Moment Isn’t (Just) About Sex. It’s Really About Work," December 10, at thecut.com	Rebecca Traister	Adam Moss, editor in chief
2019	The New Yorker	"The National Geographic Twins and the Falsehood of Our Post-Racial Future," March 14"The Profound Presence of Doria Ragland," May 21, and "The Ford-Kavanaugh Hearing Will Be Remembered as a Grotesque Display of Patriarchal Resentment," September 27, at newyorker.com	Doreen St. Félix	David Remnick, editor
2020	Catapult Magazine	“When Disability Is a Toxic Legacy,” April 23, “The Ugly Beautiful and Other Failings of Disability Representation,” October 24, and “What We Don’t Talk About When We Talk About Mental Health and Medication,” November 26	s.e. smith	Nicole Chung, editor in chief
2021	The Paris Review	Three columns from “Detroit Archives”: “Ladies of the Good Dead,” May 22, “On Immolation,” July 9, and “On Doulas,” September 15, at theparisreview.org	Aisha Sabatini Sloan	Emily Nemens, editor
2023	The New Yorker	“A Post-Roe Threat,” February 28, “The Post-Roe Era,” July 4, and “Is Abortion Sacred?,” July 16 at newyorker.com	Jia Tolentino	David Remnick, editor
2024	The Atlantic	“The Ones We Sent Away,” September	Jennifer Senior	Jeffrey Goldberg, editor in chief
2025	New York	“The Last Thing My Mother Wanted,” May 6-19	Evelyn Jouvenet	David Haskell, editor in chief Edited by Joy Shan

=== Profile Writing ===
Category was inactive from 2013 through 2019 and was reactivated in 2020. Category was briefly known as Profiles from 2000 to 2001. Honors excellence in profile writing by recognizing the vividness and perceptiveness with which the writer brings his or her subject to life.

Year	Magazine
2000	Sports Illustrated
2001	The New Yorker
2002	The New Yorker
2003	Sports Illustrated
2004	Esquire
2005	The New Yorker
2006	Esquire
2007	New York
2008	Vanity Fair
2009	Rolling Stone
2010	Esquire
2011	The New York Times
2012	D Magazine
2020	The Georgia Review
2021	The New Yorker
2022	The New Yorker
2023	The New York Times Magazine
2024	The Atlantic
2025	The Atavist

=== Fiction ===
Previously known as Fiction & Belle-Lettres (1974–1976). Honors fiction originally published in magazines. Not awarded in 2017. Succeeded by the ASME Awards for Fiction in 2018.

Year	Magazine	Article(s)	Author(s)	editor
1970	Redbook	"Tonight at 9:36" "Troubadour" "The Magic Mama"	Alfred Gillespie; Rick Sterry; Lucille Clifton	Sey Chassler, editor in chief
1971	Esquire			
1972	Mademoiselle	"A Most Incredible Meal"	William Kotzwinkle	
1973	The Atlantic	"Enormous Changes at the Last Minute"	Grace Paley	
1974	The New Yorker	"A Bad Baby" "A Story in an Almost Classical Mode" "Burial"	Roberta Silman; Harold Brodkey; Larry Woiwode	William Shawn, editor
1975	Redbook	"Swimmer in the Secret Sea"	William Kotzwinkle	Sey Chassler, editor in chief
1976	Essence	"Isom"	Hortense Spillers	Marcia Anne Gillespie, editor in chief
1977	Mother Jones'	"Peking! Peking!"	Li-li Ch’en	Jeffrey Klein, editor
1978	The New Yorker	"In the Miro District" "Potter" "The Kugelmass Episode"	Peter Taylor; Mavis Gallant; Woody Allen	William Shawn, editor
1979	The Atlantic	"Oh, Joseph, I’m So Tired"	Richard Yates	Robert Manning, editor
1980	Antaeus	"The Farm"	Joy Williams	Susan Dwyer
1981	North American Review	"Every Day a Visitor" "A Guide to the Geography of Vermont" "Summer Opportunity"	Richard Abrons; Ward Just; Maria Thomas	Robley Wilson, Jr.
1982	The New Yorker	"A Correspondence Course" "Sister Imelda" "The City"	Nadine Gordimer; Edna O’Brien; John Updike	William Shawn, editor
1983	North American Review	"Scales" "Putting and Gardening" "The Novitiate"	Louise Erdrich; William F. VanWert; Erica Liederman	Robley Wilson, Jr.
1984	Seventeen	"An Eighty Percent Chance" "The Education of Esther Eileen" "Teenage Wasteland"	Elizabeth Benedict; Roberta Silman; Anne Tyler	Midge Turk Richardson, editor in chief
1985	Playboy	"The Trail of Your Blood on the Snow" "Forky" "Julius Caesar and the Werewolf"	Gabriel García Márquez; Andre dubus III; John Gardner	Arthur Kretchmer, editorial director
1986	The Georgia Review	"Time and Fear and Somehow Love" "Something Good for Ginnie" "Somewhere Geese are Flying"	Lee K. Abbott; Mary Hood; Gary Gildner	Stanley W. Lindberg, editor
1987	Esquire	"Fleur" "Doc’s Story" "The Things They Carried"	Louise Erdrich; Edgar Wideman; Tim O’Brien	Lee Eisenberg, editor in chief
1988	The Atlantic	"A Farm at Raraba" "The Man Who Knew Belle Starr" "The Halfway Diner"	Ernst Havemann; Richard Bausch; John Sayles	William Whitworth, editor
1989	The New Yorker	"White Angel " "I Read My Nephew Stories" "We"	Michael Cunningham; Ethan Mordden; Mary Grimm	Robert Gottlieb, editor
1990	The New Yorker	"Goodness and Mercy" "The Trick of It" "Letter to the Lady of the House"	Alice Munro; Michael Frayn; Richard Bausch	Robert Gottlieb, editor
1991	Esquire	"Something to Remember Me By" "Faces of Madness" "Serious Need"	Saul Bellow; Rachel Ingalls; Reynolds Price	Lee Eisenberg, editor in chief
1992	Story	"It’s Come to This" "Silver Water" "The Greatest Living Mayan Speller Extant"	Annick Smith; Amy Bloom; W.D. Wetherell	Lois Rosenthal, editor
1993	The New Yorker	"A Wilderness Station" "Career Move" "Parachute Silk"	Alice Munro; Martin Amis; Emily Carter	Robert Gottlieb, editor
1994	Harper's Magazine	"The Prophet from Jupiter" "The 400-Pound CEO" "The Practical Heart"	Tom Earley; George Saunders; Allan Gurganus	Lewis H. Lapham, editor
1995	Story	"Waiting for the Evening News" "Kingdom of the Sun" "The Story of My Life"	Tim Gautreaux; Alice Schell; Kim Edwards	Lois Rosenthal, editor
1996	Harper's Magazine	"The Woodcarver’s Table" "Bounty" "The Lost Girl"	Mark Slouka; George Saunders; Tova Reich	Lewis H. Lapham, editor
1997	The New Yorker	"New York Girl" "Baster" "Save My Child!"	John Updike; Jeffrey Eugenides; Cynthia Ozick	Tina Brown, editor
1998	The New Yorker	"People Like THAT? US? Are the Only People Here" "A Visit" "Brokeback Mountain"	Lorrie Moore; Steven Millhauser; Annie Proulx	Tina Brown, editor
1999	Harper's Magazine	"The Whore’s Child" "Lucky Ducks" "Son of the Wolfman"	Richard Russo; Lorrie Moore; Michael Chabon	Lewis H. Lapham, editor
2000	The New Yorker	"The Third and Final Continent" "The Barber’s Unhappiness" "Dominion"	Jhumpa Lahiri; George Saunders; Robert Stone	David Remnick, editor
2001	Zoetrope: All-Story	"Fialta" "Fair Warning" "The Cavemen in the Hedges"	Rebecca Lee; Robert Olen Butler; Stacey Richter	Adrienne Brodeur, editor in chief
2002	The New Yorker	"What is Remembered" "A House on the Plains" "Surrounded by Sleep"	Alice Munro; E.L. Doctorow; Akhil Sharma	David Remnick, editor
2003	The New Yorker	"Baader-Meinhof" "The Thing in the Forest" "Jolene: A Life"	Don DeLillo; A.S. Byatt; E.L. Doctorow	David Remnick, editor
2004	Esquire	"Presence" "The Red Bow" "Rest Stop"	Arthur Miller; George Saunders; Stephen King	David Granger, editor in chief
2005	The Atlantic	"An Incomplete Map of the Northern Polarity" "Foaling Season" "The One in White"	Nathan Roberts; Aryn Kyle; Robert Olen Butler	Cullen Murphy, managing editor
2006	The Virginia Quarterly Review	"Peacekeeper" "Smother" "Ina Grove"	Alan Heathcock; Joyce Carol Oates; R.T. Smith	Ted Genoways, editor
2007	Timothy McSweeney's Quarterly Concern	"Wild Child" "To Sit, Unmoving" "The Strange Career of Dr. Raju Gopalarajan"	T.C. Boyle; Susan Steinberg; Rajesh Parameswaran	Dave Eggers, editor
2008	Harper's Magazine	"Death of the Pugilist" "Fiction" "A Report on Our Recent Troubles"	Daniel Mason; Alice Munro; Steven Millhauser	Roger D. Hodge, editor
2009	The New Yorker	"Them Old Cowboy Songs" "The Noble Truths of Suffering"	Annie Proulx; Alexsandar Hermon	David Remnick, editor
2010	McSweeney's Quarterly	"Memory Wall" "Raw Water" "Further Interpretations of Real-Life Events"	Anthony Doerr; Wells Tower; Kevin Moffett	Dave Eggers, editor
2011	The Virginia Quarterly Review	"Minor Watt"	Paul Theroux	Ted Genoways, editor
2012	Zoetrope: All-Story	"The Hox River Window"	Karen Russell	Michael Ray, editor
2013	Harper's Magazine	"Batman and Robin Have an Altercation"	Stephen King	Ellen Rosenbush, editor
2014	The New Yorker	"The Embassy of Cambodia"	Zadie Smith	David Remnick, editor Pamela Maffei McCarthy, deputy editor
2015	The New Yorker	"The Emerald Light in the Air"	Donald Antrim	David Remnick, editor
2016	Zoetrope: All-Story	"The Grozny Tourist Bureau," Fall	Anthony Marra	Michael Ray, editor
2018	Zoetrope: All-Story	“The Tornado Auction” (Summer); “Proof” (Fall); “The Full Middle of Zero” (Fall)	Karen Russell, Elizabeth McCracken, Onyinye Ihezukwu	Michael Ray, editor
2019	Timothy McSweeney's Quarterly Concern	“Skinned”; “Vinegar on the Lips of Girls”; “Unsound"	Lesley Nneka Arimah, Julia Dixon Evans, Maria Reva	Claire Boyle, managing editor
2020	The Paris Review	“Under the Ackee Tree” (Summer); “Howl Palace” (Summer); “Foxes" (Fall)	Jonathan Escoffery, Leigh Newman, Kimberly King	Emily Nemens, editor
2021	Harper's Magazine	“The Whale Mother” (January); “Terrace Story” (June); “New Poets” (November)	Susan Choi, Hilary Leichter, Michael Deagler	Christopher Beha, editor
2022	The Georgia Review	"After God, Fear Women" (Spring); "Come With Me (Summer); “Copper Queen” (Fall)	Eloghosa Osunde, Nishanth Injam, Aryn Kyle	Gerald Maa, director and editor
2023	The Paris Review	“Trial Run” (Issue 239); “Winter Term” (Issue 241); “A Good Samaritan” (Issue 242)	Zach Williams, Michelle de Kretser, Addie E. Citchens	Emily Stokes, editor
2024	The Paris Review	“This Is Everything There Will Ever Be” (Spring); “Helen” (Summer); “My Good Friend” (Summer)	Rivers Solomon, James Lasdun, Juliana Leite (transl. Zoë Perry)	Emily Stokes, editor
2025	Zoetrope: All-Story	"Seven Stories About Tammy" (Spring); "Countdown" (Spring); "Town" (Summer)	Elizabeth McCracken, Anthony Marra, Alan Murrin	Michael Ray, editor

== Former categories ==
=== National Magazine Award ===
For the first four years of the National Magazine Awards, only one award was given.

1966

- Look "for its skillful editing, imagination and editorial integrity, all of which were reflected particularly in its treatment of the racial issue during 1965."

1967

- LIFE "in recognition of skillful, imaginative and constructive editing as reflected particularly in vivid photo reporting of the war in Vietnam, outstanding coverage of the civil rights issue, and effective support for the preservation of great works of art—in keeping with an admirable tradition of public education on cultural subjects."

1968

- Newsweek "in recognition of that magazine's development of a new form of editorial analysis and advocacy in its major effort to present America's racial problems. The 'program of action,' published in Newsweek's issue of November 20, 1967, was a 23 page article combining reportage, analysis and opinion under the title 'The Negro in America: What Must Be Done.' The judges considered the project, clearly labeled as a departure from Newsweek’s standard policy, to have been skillfully and responsibly executed. They consider it a useful and important form, when sparingly used, in the news magazine field."

1969

- American Machinist, a McGraw-Hill trade publication, which was recognized for its special issue, "Will John Garth Make It?" The study of U.S. industry's role in combating unemployment, especially among those that companies might consider unemployable, included Mr. Garth, a 26-year-old high school dropout and parolee.

=== Certificates of Special Recognition ===
Identifying one winner was no doubt a challenge for the judges in the first years of the National Magazine Awards. It was decided from the start that Certificates of Special Recognition as well as commendations would be given.

1966

- Scientific American "for general excellence in its field and, particularly, for its special issue, drawing on many disciplines, dealing with the broad subject of urbanization"
- Grade Teacher "for its high quality treatment of important new subjects, conspicuously improved use of illustration and practical service to its readership—all within the limitations of a modest budget"
- Ebony "for imaginative and forceful treatment of social questions as reflected particularly in its issue on 'The White Problem in America'"

1967

- Motive "for editorial vitality, for tasteful innovation in design, and for forthright treatment of delicate issues that once would have been taboo in religious-affiliated publications"

1968

- Esquire "for its editorial creativity and diversity its original typographical and pictorial presentation, and its penetrating reporting of character and social trends as exemplified in its submitted article about Jack Ruby"
- LIFE "for its uncompromising and well documented series exposing the scale of organized crime in the United States and for its pursuit of new facets of the subject"
- Vogue "for visual grace, wit and innovation accompanied by printed content in harmony with its high graphic standard"

=== Commendation ===
Nine titles were commended at the first annual National Magazine Awards. This was the only year such recognition was given.

1966

- TIME "for the innovation of its well researched, expertly written and balanced series of ‘TIME Essays.’"
- The New Yorker "for its skillful editing and for its flair for dramatic innovation as demonstrated by its publication of Truman Capote’s ‘In Cold Blood.’"
- American Machinist "for its comprehensive treatment of the balance of payments problem as it affects industry."
- Continuum "for its role, as a Roman Catholic magazine of small circulation, in delving into controversy and presenting strong conviction and thorough research in a handsome format."
- Motive "for skillful and dramatic presentations of major issues in a small-circulation Protestant magazine."
- Vogue "for its effective use of color in editorial pages."
- Fortune "for its clear and thoughtful presentations, including its series offering a fresh look at the influence of automation."
- TV Guide "for dealing thoughtfully with controversial topics in a setting where others might have settled for fan-appeal trivia."
- LIFE "for overall skill in dealing with contemporary civilization, cultural subjects and public affairs."

=== Special Award ===
Year	Magazine
1976	TIME, Bicentennial Issue
1989	Robert E. Kenyon, Jr.

=== Specialized Journalism ===
Year	Magazine
1970	Philadelphia
1971	Rolling Stone
1972	Architectural Record
1973	Psychology Today
1974	Texas Monthly
1975	Medical economics
1976	United Mine Workers
1977	Architectural Record
1978	Scientific American
1979	National Journal
1980	IEEE Spectrum

=== Essays and Criticism ===
Category previously known as "Criticism & Belle-Lettres" (1977) and Essays (2000–10). Honors "long-form journalism that presents the opinions of the writer on topics ranging from the personal to the political." Not awarded after 2022. (Reviews and Criticism awarded starting in 2023)

Year	Magazine	Article(s)	Author(s)	Editor
1977	Mother Jones	"Peking! Peking!"	Li-li Ch'en	Jeffrey Klein, editor
1978	Esquire	"High on War"	Michael Herr	Don Erickson, editorial director, Clay S. Felker, editor and publisher
1979	LIFE	"The View from 80"	Malcolm Cowley	Philip B. Kunhardt, Jr., managing editor
1980	Natural History	Columns on Evolutionary Biology	Stephen Jay Gould	Alan Ternes
1981	TIME	"Back to Reticence", "Return to Patriotism", "Rediscovering America"	Lance Morrow	Ray Cave, managing editor
1982	The Atlantic	"Designer Dancing", "Balanchine's Tchaikovsky", "Moving Pictures"	Holly Bruback	William Whitworth, editor
1983	The American Lawyer	"Headnotes" (column)	Steven Brill	Steven Brill, editor in chief and chairman
1984	The New Republic	"The End of the World", "Crosscurrents: Pseudo-Private Lives", "The Politics of a Plague"	Charles Krauthammer	Martin Peretz, editor in chief and chairman
1985	Boston	"Politics"	Howard Carr	Donald H. Forst, editor
1986	The Sciences	"The Information Age: bsohligrimtyhplrylvdb", "The Computer Behind the Curtain", "His Voice's Master"	Robert Wright	Paul T. Libassi, editor
1987	Outside	"The Same River Twice", "Out of the Noösphere", "Chambers of Memory"	David Quammen	Lawrence J. Burke, publisher and editor in chief
1988	Harper's Magazine	"The Next Panic"	L. J. Davis	Lewis H. Lapham, editor
1989	Harper's Magazine	"The Urge for an End", "Who Won the West? Apologies to the Water Birds and Ranch Hands", "I'm Black, You're White, Who's Innocent"	Edward Hoagland, William Kittredge, Shelby Steele	Lewis H. Lapham, editor
1990	Vanity Fair	"Darkness Visible"	William Styron	Tina Brown, editor in chief
1991	The Sciences	"The Aesthetic Equation", "A Ripple in Gravity's Lens", "Dead Ringer"	Hans Christian von Baeyer	Peter G. Brown, editor
1992	The Nation	"Naming and Blaming: Media Goes Wilding in Palm Beach", "Why We Read: Canon to the Right of Me..."	Katha Pollitt	Victor S. Navasky, editor
1993	The American Lawyer	"Maybe the Jury Was Right"	Roger Parloff	Steven Brill, president and editor in chief
1994	Harper's Magazine	"Mirrorings", "A Woman's Work", "The Crash of Blue-Sky California"	Lucy Grealy, Louise Erdrich, David Beers	Lewis H. Lapham, editor
1995	Harper's Magazine	"Robert Barons Redux", "Morte de Nixon", "Terms of Endearment"	Lewis H.Lapham	Lewis H. Lapham, editor
1996	The New Yorker	"True Grid", "Did He Do It?", "Modes of Seduction"	Simon Schama	Tina Brown, editor
1997	The New Yorker	"Escaping Picasso"	Adam Gopnik	Tina Brown, editor
1998	The New Yorker	"Who Owns Anne Frank?"	Cynthia Ozick	Tina Brown, editor
1999	The Atlantic	"Hymn"	Emily Hiestand	William Whitworth, editor
2000	The Sciences	"Clock of Ages"	Brian Hayes	Peter G. Brown, editor
2001	The New Yorker	"Like a King"	Adam Gopnik	David Remnick, editor
2002	The New Yorker	"My Father's Brain"	Jonathan Franzen	David Remnick, editor
2003	The American Scholar	"A Piece of Cotton"	Anne Fadiman	Anne Fadiman, editor
2004	The New Yorker	"A Sudden Illness"	Laura Hillenbrand	David Remnick, editor
2005	National Geographic	"Was Darwin Wrong?"	David Quammen	William L. Allen, editor in chief
2006	Vanity Fair	"A Matter of Life and Death"	Marjorie Williams	Graydon Carter, editor
2007	The Georgia Review	"Russell and Mary"	Michael Donohue	Stephen Corey, acting editor
2008	New Letters	"I Am Joe's Prostate"	Thomas E. Kennedy	Robert Stewart, editor in chief
2009	Backpacker	"The Source of All Things"	Tracy Ross	Jonathan Dorn, editor in chief
2010	National Geographic	"Top Ten State Fair Joys"	Garrison Keillor	Chris Johns, editor in chief
2011	The Paris Review	"Mister Lytle: An Essay"	John Jeremiah Sullivan	Lorin Stein, editor
2012	New York	"Paper Tigers"	Wesley Yang	Adam Moss, editor in chief
2013	The Atlantic	"Fear of a Black President"	Ta-Nehisi Coates	James Bennet, editor in chief Scott Stossel, editor
2014	The New Yorker	"Thanksgiving in Mongolia"	Ariel Levy	David Remnick, editor Pamela Maffei McCarthy, deputy editor
2015	The New Yorker	"This Old Man"	Roger Angell	David Remnick, editor
2016	Esquire	"The Friend,"	Matthew Teague	David Granger, editor in chief
2017	The New York Times Magazine	"David's Ankles,"	Sam Anderson	Jake Silverstein, editor in chief
2018	The Atlantic	"Lola’s Story," June	Alex Tizon	Jeffrey Goldberg, editor in chief
2019	The New York Times Magazine	"Getting Out," October 21	Reginald Dwayne Betts	Jake Silverstein, editor in chief
2020	Poetry	"Tactile Art," October	John Lee Clark	Don Share, editor
2021	The New Yorker	"The Trayvon Generation," June 22	Elizabeth Alexander	David Remnick, editor
2022	The New York Times Magazine	"Bodies on the Line," September 19	Carina del Valle Schorske	Jake Silverstein, editor in chief

=== News and Documentary Photography ===
Previously known as Photojournalism (2007–2010) and News Photography (2011–2012). Honors excellence in the informative photographic documentation of an event or subject in real-time.

Year	Magazine
2007	The Paris Review
2008	National Geographic
2009	National Geographic
2010	National Geographic
2011	The New York Times
2012	Harper's Magazine

=== Photography, Digital Media ===
Honors overall excellence in the design of magazine websites and online-only magazines.

Year	Magazine
2010	National Geographic
2011	LIFE

=== General Excellence in Digital Media ===
Previously known as General Excellence in New Media (1997–2000), General Excellence Online (2001–2009) and General Excellence, Digital Media (2010–2013).

Year	Magazine
1997	Money
1998	Sporting News
1999	Cigar Aficionado
2000	Bloomberg Businessweek
2001	U.S. News & World Report
2002	National Geographic
2003	Slate
2004	CNET
2005	Style.com
2006	National Geographic
2007	Beliefnet
2008	Runner's World
2009	New York; Backpacker
2010	New York
2011	Slate
2012	New York
2013	Pitchfork

=== Design, Digital Media ===
Previously known as Best Interactive Design (2001). Honors overall excellence in the design of magazine websites and online-only magazines.

Year	Magazine
2001	SmartMoney
2010	Billboard
2011	The New York Times
2012	Wired

=== Reporting, Digital Media ===
Previously known as News Reporting (2010–2011). Honors overall excellence in the design of magazine websites and online-only magazines.

Year	Magazine
2010	The Virginia Quarterly Review
2011	Foreign Policy
2012	Wired

=== Personal Service, Digital Media ===
Previously known as Interactive Service (2007) and Personal Service Online (2008–2008). Honors a site’s effective use of multimedia technology to deliver information that users can act on to improve the quality of their personal lives or enjoy recreational pursuits.

Year	Magazine
2007	Bloomberg Businessweek
2008	Bloomberg Businessweek
2009	Backpacker
2012	Men's Health

=== Commentary, Digital Media ===
Previously known as Blogging (2010–2011). Honors excellence in opinion journalism on digital platforms.

Year	Magazine
2010	Foreign Policy
2011	Tablet Magazine
2012	The American Scholar

=== Website Department ===
Previously known as Regular Department or Section (2010) and Online Department (2011). Honors a regularly updated, clearly branded department or channel.

Year	Magazine
2010	Sports Illustrated
2011	Fast Company
2012	The Daily Beast

=== Utility App ===
Previously known as Interactive Feature (2007–2009) and Interactive Tool (2010–2011). Honors an outstanding app, feature or section of a website that uses multimedia technology, tools, community platforms or other interactive formats to deliver or share content such as news, information and entertainment, rather than practical instruction or advice.

Year	Magazine
2007	New York
2008	Bicycling
2009	AARP The Magazine
2010	Men's Health
2011	Epicurious
2012	TIME

=== Community ===
Year	Magazine
2010	National Geographic

=== Tablet Magazine ===
Previously known as Mobile Media (2010), Mobile Edition (2011) and Tablet Edition (2012). Honors magazines published on tablets and e-readers, including digital-only magazines.

Year	Magazine
2010	Epicurious
2011	Esquire
2012	National Geographic
2013	National Geographic
2014	National Geographic
2015	National Geographic

=== Multimedia ===
Previously known as Multimedia Feature or Package (2010) and Multimedia Package (2011). Honors digital storytelling and the integration of magazine media.

Year	Title	Article(s) and Author(s)	Editor
2010	New York	"New York Fashion Week"	Adam Moss, editor in chief Ben Williams, editorial director, NYMag.com
2011	The Virginia Quarterly Review	"Assignment Afghanistan"	Ted Genoways, editor Elliott D. Woods, reporter and multimedia production Jesse Dukes, multimedia and audio production Bluecadet Interactive, web design and product coordination
2012	Foreign Policy	"The Qaddafi Files: An FP Special Report"	Susan B. Glasser, editor in chief
2013	National Geographic	"Cheetahs on the Edge," November iPad Edition	Chris Johns, editor in chief
2014	National Geographic	"The Last Chase," by Robert Draper, November Print and iPad Edition	Chris Johns, editor in chief
2015	The Texas Observer in partnership with The Guardian US	"Beyond the Border," by Melissa del Bosque, August 6 at texasobserver.org	Dave Mann, editor in chief, The Texas Observer Katharine Viner, editor in chief, Guardian US
2016	New York	"This Is the Story of One Block in Bed-Stuy, Brooklyn," nymag.com and November 16–22 Print Issue	Adam Moss, editor in chief
2017	Huffington Post Highline	"The 21st Century Gold Rush," by Malia Politzer and Emily Kassie, December 21 at highline.huffingtonpost.com	Rachel Morris and Greg Veis, executive editors

=== Magazine of the Year ===
Honors magazines for editorial excellence as demonstrated in print and on digital platforms for the quality and consistency of magazine-branded content and services produced by or associated with the publication, including but not limited to conferences and events; books; and radio and television programs.

Year	Magazine	Issues	Editor
2010	Glamour	April, September, November	Cynthia Leive, editor in chief Jill Herzig, executive editor Ben Berentson, online managing editor
2011	National Geographic	February, April, December; NationalGeographic.com	Chris Johns, editor in chief Rob Covey, digital media editor, NGM.com
2012	TIME	May 20, October 17 and December 26, 2011/January 2, 2012 Print Issues; TIME.com; Weekly iPad App	Rick Stengel, managing editor Catherine Sharick, managing editor, TIME.com
2013	New York	May 28, October 22, November 12 Print and iPad Editions, nymag.com	Adam Moss, editor in chief Ben Williams, online editorial director
2014	Fast Company	March, May, October Print Editions; May, June, July/August iPad Editions; fastcompany.com	Robert Safian, editor Florian Bachleda, creative director Noah Robischon, executive director of digital
2015	Vogue	February, April and July Print and Tablet Editions; vogue.com	Anna Wintour, editor in chief
2016	The Atlantic	January/February, March and October; The Atlantic Magazine: digital editor; theatlantic.com	James Bennet, editor in chief Scott Stossel, editor John Gould, editor, TheAtlantic.com
2017	Mother Jones	January/February, July/August and November/December; November/December Tablet Edition; motherjones.com	Clara Jeffery, editor in chief Ivylise Simones, creative director

=== Magazine Section ===
Honors a regularly published front- or back-of-the-book department or section.

Year	Magazine	Article(s)	Editor
2005	Popular Science	"How 2.0," April, May, June	Scott Mowbray, editor in chief
2006	Backpacker	"Basecamp," June, September, December	Jonathan Dorn, editor in chief
2007	New York	"Strategist," June 12, July 24, December 11	Adam Moss, editor in chief
2008	Condé Nast Portfolio	"Brief," September, October, December	Joanne Lipman, editor in chief
2009	Wired	"Start," September, October, December	Chris Anderson, editor in chief
2010	New York	"Strategist," April 20, May 25, October 26	Adam Moss, editor in chief
2011	New York	"Strategist," May 24, October 25, December 20–27	Adam Moss, editor in chief
2012	New York	"Strategist," July 11, October 10, November 28	Adam Moss, editor in chief
2013	New York	"Strategist," May 28, October 8, October 22	Adam Moss, editor in chief
2014	Modern Farmer	"Modern Farmer Handbook," Spring, Fall, Winter	Anne Marie Gardner, chief executive officer and editor in chief
2015	New York	"Strategist," March 24 – April 6, April 7–20 and November 17–23	Adam Moss, editor in chief
2016	New York	"The Culture Pages," March 9–22, October 5–18 and October 19 – November 1	Adam Moss, editor in chief
2017	New York	"The Culture Pages," June 13–26, June 27 – July 10, and August 8–21	Adam Moss, editor in chief
2018	New York	"The Strategist," March 20 – April 2, September 18 – October 1 and December 11–24	Adam Moss, editor in chief

=== Website ===
Honors magazine websites and online-only magazines. Divided into two categories in 2019: "News and Opinion"-Honors magazine websites covering politics, business, technology and entertainment- and "Service and Life Style" – Honors magazine websites covering fashion, food, travel and design. (2012-2020)

2012	New York	Adam Moss, editor in chief Ben Williams, editorial director, nymag.com
2013	The Atlantic	James Bennet, editor in chief Bob Cohn, editor, Atlantic Digital
2014	New York	Adam Moss, editor in chief Ben Williams, editorial director
2015	Nautilus	Michael Segal, editor in chief
2016	New York	Adam Moss, editor in chief Ben Williams, editor, Digital
2017	National Geographic	Susan Goldberg, editor in chief
2018	New York	Adam Moss, editor in chief
2019	The Marshall Project	Bill Keller, editor in chief
2019	Roads & Kingdoms	Nathan Thornburgh, editor in chief Cengiz Yar, managing editor
2020	The Marshall Project	Susan Chira, editor in chief

=== Digital Innovation ===
Honors the outstanding use of digital media by magazine websites and digital-only magazines

Year	Title	Article(s) and Author(s)	Editor
2018	SB Nation	"17776: An American Football Story," by Jon Bois, July 5	Elena Bergeron, editor in chief
2019	The New York Times Magazine	"The Voyages Issue," September 21 at nytimes.com and on The New York Times mobile app and September 23 in print	Jake Silverstein, editor in chief
2020	The Marshall Project in partnership with The Guardian	“Detained,” by Emily Kassie, September 24 at themarshallproject.org	Susan Chira, editor in chief, The Marshall Project

== See also ==
- List of literary awards
