= The Sciences =

- The Sciences cover Vol. 39, No. 4, 1999
- Editor: Peter G. Brown
- Categories: Science, Art
- Frequency: Bimonthly (until 2001); Quarterly (2001)
- Circulation: Under 100,000
- Publisher: Rodney W. Nichols
- Founded: 1961; 65 years ago
- Final issue: 2001; 25 years ago
- Company: New York Academy of Sciences
- Country: United States
- Based in: New York, New York
- Language: English
- Website: The Sciences Archive
- ISSN: 0036-861X

The Sciences was a magazine published from 1961 to 2001 by the New York Academy of Sciences. Each issue contained articles that discussed science issues with cultural relevance, illustrated with fine art and an occasional cartoon. The periodical won seven National Magazine Awards over the course of its publication.
