= List of The Daily Pennsylvanian people =

The following is a list of notable people who have served on the staff of The Daily Pennsylvanian, the student newspaper at the University of Pennsylvania.

== Academia ==
- Arnold Eisen, chancellor, Jewish Theological Seminary
- Josiah Penniman, provost of the University of Pennsylvania.
- Michael Stuart Brown, geneticist and physician; 1985 Nobel Prize in Physiology or Medicine

== Business ==
- Richard Fisher, New York real estate developer
- Leonard Lauder, chairman and CEO, Estée Lauder Companies
- Marc Turtletaub, CEO of The Money Store and co-founder of Big Beach

== Journalists, authors, and writers ==
- Charles Addams, cartoonist
- Binyamin Appelbaum, editor, The New York Times
- Buzz Bissinger, author of Friday Night Lights; 1987 Pulitzer Prize for Investigative Reporting
- Claudia Cohen, gossip columnist, socialite, and television reporter
- Jean Chatzky, financial editor for TODAY
- Frank Dolson, Philadelphia Inquirer sports writer
- Lee Eisenberg, editor for Esquire magazine
- Robert Elegant, journalist known for his coverage of the Korean and Vietnam Wars
- Stefan Fatsis, former Wall Street Journal reporter and author ofWord Freak
- Gaeton Fonzi, reporter and editor for Philadelphia Magazine
- Stephen Glass, disgraced former New Republic writer
- Jeffrey Goldberg, editor-in-chief of The Atlantic
- Erik Larson, author
- Gab Marcotti, sports journalist, ESPN FC
- Donald Morrison, editor for Time magazine
- Charles Ornstein, senior reporter, ProPublica; 2005 Pulitzer Prize for Public Service
- Ashley Parker, reporter for The Washington Post
- Ken Rosenthal, sportswriter, reporter, and sportscaster for Fox Sports
- Dan Rottenberg, journalist, editor and author of 10 books
- Lisa Scottoline, author
- Alan Schwarz, reporter for The New York Times
- Steve Stecklow, global investigative reporter, Reuters; 2019 Pulitzer Prize for International Reporting 2007 Pulitzer Prize for Public Service
- Richard Stevenson, Washington bureau chief for The New York Times
- Josh Tyrangiel, staff writer at The Atlantic and former chief content officer of Bloomberg Media
- Cenk Uygur, host of TheYoungTurks

== Politics, government, and law ==
- Harold Ford Jr., U.S. representative from Tennessee
- Benjamin Ginsberg, lawyer and counsel for George W. Bush and Mitt Romney's presidential campaigns
- David A. Gross, U.S. ambassador
- Helen Gym, Philadelphia City Council
- Frank Luntz, political consultant and pollster
- Gene Sperling, former director of the United States National Economic Council
- Maurice Obstfeld, chief economist, International Monetary Fund
- George Wharton Pepper, U.S. senator from Pennsylvania
- Owen Roberts, associate justice of the U.S. Supreme Court
- John Haines Ware III, U.S. representative from Pennsylvania

== Other ==
- Wilson Hobson Jr., bronze medalist, 1932 Summer Olympics
- Josiah McCracken, physician; silver and bronze medalist, 1900 Summer Olympics
- Matt Selman, producer, The Simpsons
- Josh Heald, writer and producer, Hot Tub Time Machine and Cobra Kai
