= Steve Brodner =

American cartoonist

- Born: October 19, 1954 (age 72) Brooklyn, New York, U.S.
- Areas: Cartoonist, Illustrator
- Awards: See full list

Steve Brodner (born October 19, 1954, in Brooklyn, New York) is a satirical illustrator, editorial cartoonist, and caricaturist working for publications in the US since the 1970s. He is accepted in the fields of journalism and the graphic arts as a master of the editorial idiom. Currently a regular contributor to GQ, The Nation, Newsweek, The Washington Post, and Los Angeles Times, Brodner's art journalism has appeared in major magazines and newspapers in the United States, such as Rolling Stone, The New York Times, The New Yorker, Esquire, Time, Playboy, Mother Jones, Harper's, and The Atlantic. His work, first widely seen exposing and attacking Reagan Era scandals, is credited with helping spearhead the 1980s revival of pointed and entertaining graphic commentary in the US. He is currently working on a book about the presidents of the United States. He posts to his blog, The Greater Quiet on Substack.

== Early life and education ==
Brodner attended Cooper Union in New York City and graduated in 1976 with a Bachelor of Fine Arts Degree. Brodner went on to work briefly for the Hudson Dispatch in Hudson County, New Jersey, after leaving college.

== Career ==
Between 1979 and 1982 he self-published the New York Illustrated News, which featured his work as well as those of colleagues. In 1977, he began his freelance career with The New York Times Book Review, working with Steven Heller, art director. Soon he was working with Lewis Lapham and Sheila Wolfe at Harper's Magazine on a monthly page of commentary entitled Ars Politica.

In the following year he became a regular contributor to magazines across the US, eventually becoming house artist as well as writer and artist of monthly back pages for Esquire under the editorships of Lee Eisenberg, David Hirshey and the designer, Rip Georges. During and after Esquire it was on to Spy Magazine and then to The New Yorker, under Tina Brown and then David Remnick, Chris Curry, Caroline Maihot, and Françoise Mouly, art directors. At Rolling Stone, under Jann Wenner and Amid Capesi, art director, Brodner was the film review artist, working with Peter Travers, and later a series for the National Affairs page with Matt Taibbi and others.

== Art journalism ==
In visual essays, Brodner has covered eight national political conventions for Esquire, The Progressive, The Village Voice and others.

His article "Plowed Under," a series of portraits and interviews with beleaguered farm families in the Midwest, ran in The Progressive. Shots From Guns, an art documentary about the Colt Firearms strike in Hartford, Connecticut, appeared in Northeast magazine in 1989.

For The New Yorker he covered Oliver North and the 1994 Virginia Senate race, the Patrick Buchanan presidential campaign, the Million Man March (1995) and an advance story on the 1996 Democratic Convention in Chicago. That same year, The Washington Post asked him to profile the Bob Dole presidential campaign. In spring of 1997 he wrote and drew a ten-page article on the South by Southwest Music Festival for Texas Monthly. That summer, Brodner climbed Mount Fuji with author Susan Orlean as an art-journalist for Outside Magazine and later that year he did a piece on the New York City mayoral campaign for New York magazine. His eight-page profile of George W. Bush appeared in Esquire in October 1998, in which Bush said to him, “Maybe I’ll see you in national politics next year, maybe not. Either way, I have a cool life.”

In 2000, he dealt with the difficult issue of guns in Pennsylvania for Philadelphia Magazine. Texas Monthly published his ten-page story on Colonias (Mexican Americans along the Texas border), called "In America"; in May 2005 and in 2007 he traversed the Texas State Capitol at Austin in a freewheeling story for Texas Monthly.

== Television and video ==
As a young artist, Brodner entered and won first place in a major illustration competition sponsored by the Population Institute—an award presented by the legendary New York Times caricaturist Al Hirschfeld. Following the award publicity he subsequently appeared on the 1974-75 season of the popular game show To Tell The Truth where he failed to fool any of the panelists who all voted for him, except for Peggy Cass who disqualified herself from voting as she had seen his picture in the paper.

In the fall of 1996, Brodner was featured in PBS Frontline's The Choice, as artist and commentator on the Clinton/Dole race. In December 2007, Brodner began a series of online videos, The Naked Campaign, at The New Yorker website, offering his take on the 2008 Presidential campaign. Since 2010 he has been producing videos for PBS' Need to Know, with "An Editorial by Steve Brodner," a semi-regular commentary feature. In the spring of 2010, his series of short political videos, "Smashing Crayons", ran on Slate.

== Awards ==
Brodner has had his work honored in juried annuals of American Illustration, Society of Illustrators, and Communication Arts continuously for over 20 years.

- 2024 Herblock Prize for editorial cartooning
- 2011 Society of Illustrators, Gold Medal, Editorial category
- 2010 National Cartoonists Society Reuben Award, Advertising category
- 2010 The Cooper Union, St. Gaudens Medal, Distinguished Achievement by an alumnus
- 2007 National Cartoonists Society Reuben Award in Magazine Illustration
- 2006 Society of Illustrators Gold Medal in the sequential category
- 2005 Society of Illustrators Hamilton King Award
- 2000 James Aronson Award for Social Justice Journalism
- 1995 Society of Publication Designers merit award
- 1994 Art Director's Club

== Bibliography ==
- Fold and Tuck (Doubleday, 1990) ISBN 0-385-41164-2
- Davy Crockett: The Legendary Frontiersman (Simon & Schuster, 1995) ISBN 0-689-80189-0
- Sharing the Pie: A Citizen's Guide to Wealth and Power (Henry Holt, 1998) ISBN 0-805-05206-2
- Freedom Fries (Fantagraphics Books, 2003) (ISBN 1-560-97593-8)
- (contributor) The Bush Junta: A Field Guide to Corruption in Government, edited by Gary Groth and Mack White (Fantagraphics Books, 2004) ISBN 1-560-97612-8
- (editor) Artists Against the War (Underwood Books, 2011) ISBN 978-1599290300
- (illustrator) Bingsop's Fables: Little Morals for Big Business, written by Stanley Bing (Harper Business, 2011) ISBN 978-0061998522
- Living & Dying in America: A Daily Chronicle 2020-2022. Fantagraphics. 2022. ISBN 978-1-68396-553-4.
