= John McDonald (entrepreneur) =

Entrepreneur

John McDonald is a restaurateur and entrepreneur based in New York City. He is the founder and CEO of Mercer Street Hospitality, and co-founder of Tasting Table Media.

== Career ==
McDonald began his career in nightlife with MercBar and went on to open restaurants including Canteen, Lever House, Lure Fishbar, Bowery Meat Company, El Toro Blanco, Burger & Barrel and Chinatown Brasserie.

In 2002 McDonald co-founded the Mexican restaurant Dos Caminos with Steve Hanson of BR Guest Restaurants. He was bought out in 2007 when Starwood Capital purchased all of BR Guest.

Prior to founding Tasting Table, a culinary lifestyle publication, he started a niche magazine title, CITY, acting as both Editorial Director and Publisher from 1999 to 2008. The magazine was nominated for National Magazine Awards in 2002 for General Excellence, for Photography in 2004 and Photo Portfolio in 2007 (winner). He closed the magazine in 2008 and started Tasting Table with Bob Pittman.

He is also the co-founder of the beverage brand EBOOST along with Josh Taekman, in 2007.

McDonald was the first American restaurateur to bring the design work of Marc Newson to New York with the 1999 project Canteen and then again together developed the Lever House Restaurant inside the modernist landmark Lever House. He received a Michelin Star in 2005 for this restaurant.

He was mentioned by New York magazine as one of The New Yorkers of 1999.
