= Tasting Table =

American food and drink website

- Website type: Food and drink news
- Headquarters: Indianapolis, Indiana, {{{location_country}}}
- Owner: Static Media
- Founder: John McDonald
- Website: tastingtable.com
- Launched: October 2008; 17 years ago
- Current status: Online

Tasting Table is an American food and drink website owned by the digital media company Static Media. Its website and email newsletter cover trends in dining, wine, cocktails, cooking, and food travel. Tasting Table also publishes original articles, photos, and videos and has hosted events such as the Lobster Rumble in New York City and Los Angeles.

== History ==
Tasting Table was founded in 2008 by Geoff Bartakovics and John McDonald, with backing from the Pilot Group, a private equity firm established by Bob Pittman.

The publication launched as a free daily email newsletter with local editions covering New York City, Los Angeles, San Francisco, Washington, D.C. and Chicago, with emails sent to subscribers before lunchtime to coincide with mealtime browsing. Alongside the local editions, Tasting Table published a national edition and a chef's recipes edition, which adapted unpublished recipes from professional chefs for home cooks.

From 2010 to 2018, Tasting Table hosted an annual lobster roll competition, originally titled the Lobster Roll Claw-Off. The event was held in New York City and later moved to Los Angeles. Winners received recognition as Fan Favorite, selected by event attendees, or Editor's Choice, selected by Tasting Table editors.

In 2012, Tasting Table acquired the health-focused daily newsletter Vital Juice, which had been co-founded in 2006 by Amanda Freeman and Lisa Blau.

In 2015, Tasting Table acquired Flavour and relaunched it as DINE by Tasting Table, a curated restaurant discovery app. Tasting Table editors selected the restaurants featured across the app's eight cities, while DINE aggregated reviews from local and national publications, critics, and food websites.

In May 2019, Tasting Table published its first cookbook, Tasting Table Cooking with Friends: Recipes for Modern Entertaining, written by Bartakovics and Tasting Table creative director and editor-at-large Todd Coleman, and published by Flatiron Books.

In 2021, Tasting Table was acquired by Static Media.
