= The Cactus League =

2020 novel by Emily Nemens

- First edition cover
- Author: Emily Nemens
- Language: English
- Publisher: Farrar, Straus and Giroux
- Publication date: February 4, 2020
- Publication place: United States
- Pages: 288

The Cactus League is a 2020 novel by American author and editor Emily Nemens. The novel takes place in Arizona, during spring training. The title refers to the league of Major League Baseball teams that play their spring training games in Arizona. By contrast, other MLB teams, those in the Grapefruit League, play in Florida.

== Synopsis ==
The Cactus League presents stories from multiple narrators in Scottsdale, Arizona, the home of Salt River Fields, the spring training facility of the Los Angeles Lions professional baseball team. Each of the novel's nine chapters are told from the perspective of a different narrator, with each chapter preceded by narration from an unnamed veteran sportswriter who discusses how each of their various stories are interlinked and provides philosophical musings about baseball and life in general. The story of Jason Goodyear, the handsome and famous star outfielder for the Lions, is a common thread throughout each of the chapters. Although he appears to be very straight-laced and respectable to outsiders, over the course of the novel it is revealed that Jason has recently been divorced by his wife and lost the vast majority of his wealth due to a serious gambling addiction.

The first chapter tells the story of Michael Taylor, an aging batting coach struggling to stay relevant with the Lions. The book opens with Michael and his wife returning to their Arizona house for the start of spring training, only to find that squatters have broken into it during the off-season. The house is trashed and many of the belonging have been stolen, including Michael's prized Cadillac. Undeterred, he cleans the house himself and prepares for the season. When he later finds the stolen Cadillac parked outside a restaurant, he smashes it with a baseball bat. The second chapter focuses on Tamara Rowland, a middle-aged divorcée who attempts to engage baseball players in casual sexual experiences each spring training season. She ends up spending an evening with Jason Goodyear, and they trespass at Taliesin West, the former winter home of architect Frank Lloyd Wright, where Jason gets arrested after damaging property and starting a fire. The next chapter features Herb Allison, a legendary sports agent who recently started using a wheelchair due to an injury. He hires Sara, an attractive physical therapy assistant with a dark past, to become his new assistant. They bail Jason out of jail after his arrest, and Herb tries to navigate the resulting scandal.

The fourth chapter features Stephen Smith, a partial owner of the Los Angeles Lions who is close friends with veteran player Trey Townsend, who he has groomed over the years to act more like Smith himself. It is implied the two men are in a secret romantic relationship with each other, and when Trey develops an interest in another, younger baseball player, a jealous Stephen arranges for Trey to be traded. The next chapter focuses on Greg Carver, a once-talented pitcher whose career is derailed due to Tommy John surgery. He struggles to return from the surgery due to pain when he pitches and an addiction to painkillers, and he is ultimately cut from the team. Chapter six revolves around the lives of the baseball players' wives during spring training, which includes lavish parties and a strict social hierarchy. The chapter is largely told from the perspective of Melissa Moyers, who secretly fears losing her status because her husband is planning to divorce her.

Chapter seven features two primary narrators: Lester Morrow, an aging musician who plays the stadium's organ, and William Goslin, a Lions first-round draft pick who showed great potential during his amateur career at his home in New Jersey, but is struggling to adjust to professional baseball. William meets Jason Goodyear at a casino, and Jason manipulates him into lending him $500,000 to help cover his gambling debts. Williams is later cut from the team. The eighth chapter is about a six-year-old boy named Alex, whose mother is a drug addict who has been squatting in various houses, including Michael Taylor's earlier in the novel. She works in concessions at the stadium, and the chapter ends with her leaving Alex in a hot car in the stadium parking lot while she goes with a man to snort cocaine. The final chapter focuses on Jason Goodyear, who has become indebted to a loan shark due to his gambling. After paying the loan shark with the money he borrowed from William, the book ends with Jason returning to the stadium and finding an unconscious Alex in the back of the car. He breaks a window and calls an ambulance, saving the boy's life.

== Development and style ==
The Cactus League began as Nemens' MFA thesis.

Though billed as a novel, the book takes the form of nine interlinked stories, following different characters connected to a fictional baseball team, the Los Angeles Lions. A fictional sportswriter narrates the novel, and his thoughts and writing precede each chapter.
