= Gary Smith (sportswriter) =

American sportswriter (born 1953)

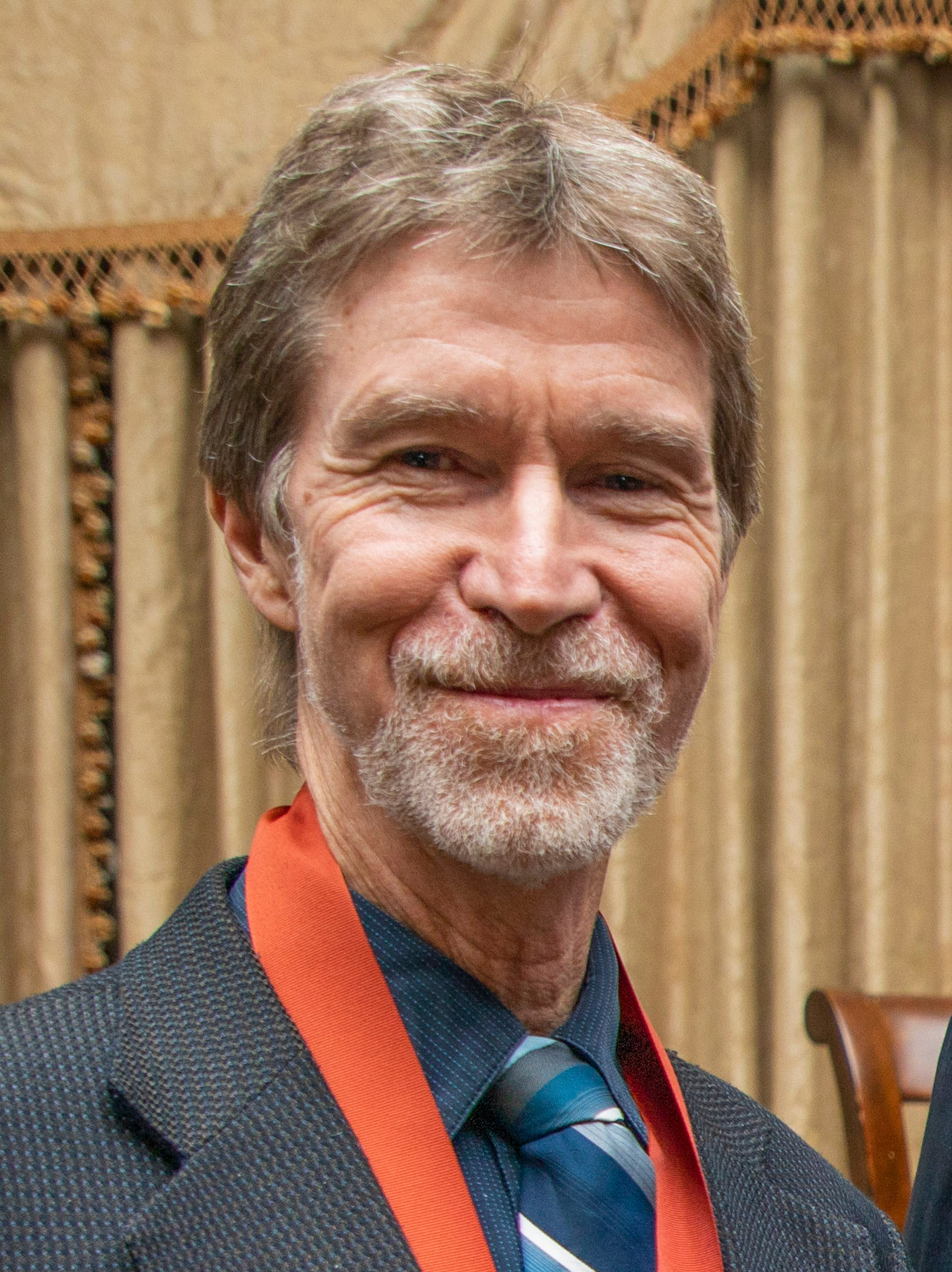
Gary Smith (2019)

Gary Smith (born October 27, 1953) is an American sportswriter. He is best known for his lengthy human interest stories in Sports Illustrated, where he worked from 1983 to 2013.

== Career ==
Smith worked as a sportswriter for the Wilmington News Journal, the Philadelphia Daily News, the New York Daily News, and Inside Sports before joining Sports Illustrated. His writing has also appeared in Time, Rolling Stone, and Esquire.

For many years, Smith's role as senior writer at Sports Illustrated has been to write four lengthy feature articles per year, most of which are in-depth personality profiles. His wife, Sally, has described his motivation as follows: "He is not satisfied with putting facts together. He wants to understand what is the core conflict that has driven that person. He hopes to tell a secret that a person might not be aware of." Several of Smith's subjects have attested to his profound insight.

Smith has received many awards and honors for his work at Sports Illustrated. He won the National Magazine Award for non-fiction, the magazine equivalent of the Pulitzer Prize, a record four times and was a finalist for the award a record ten times. His stories have appeared in The Best American Sports Writing series a record 12 times. Some of his literary peers have called him "the best magazine writer in America" and "America's best sportswriter". He also has been cited as a role model by younger sportswriters.

He was inducted into the Delaware Sports Hall of Fame as part of its 2020/2021 class.

== Bibliography ==
Smith has published two books; both are collections of his magazine features:

- Beyond The Game: The Collected Sports Writing of Gary Smith, published in 2001.
- Sports Illustrated: Going Deep: 20 Classic Sports Stories, published in 2008.
