= Backpacker (magazine) =

American magazine

- Categories: Hiking, Science, Lifestyle
- Total circulation: 353,799 (2013) (2013)
- Founder: William Kemsley
- Founded: 1973
- Final issue: 2022 (print)
- Company: Outside
- Country: USA
- Based in: Boulder, Colorado
- Language: English
- Website: backpacker.com
- ISSN: 0277-867X

Backpacker is an American lifestyle magazine publication that features information on wilderness hiking and adventure. It has been published since 1973. Backpacker magazine is currently published by Outside and is based in Boulder, Colorado.

Originally started in Bedford Hills, New York, the magazine moved to Emmaus, Pennsylvania in the late 1980s and then to Boulder in August 2007.

== History ==
The first issue of Backpacker appeared in the spring of 1973. The first editor's note written by William Kemsley, the founding editor, explains that it took three years to put together the first issue of Backpacker, and that the founding editors worried that America in the early 1970s did not contain a backpacking community large enough to support a magazine. It also expresses Kemsley's goal to support the magazine primarily through subscriptions rather than advertising.

The Winter/Spring 2007 issue of the journal Appalachia includes an essay by Kemsley titled "How the 1970s Backpacking Boom Burst Upon Us,". Kemsley discusses how he developed the idea to create a magazine about backpacking, and describes several critical moments supported the idea that an audience existed for such a magazine.

Backpacker was owned first by Kemsley, who sold it to Ziff Davis in 1980, which sold it to CBS Publishing. In the late 1980s, it was bought by Rodale, Inc., in Emmaus, Pennsylvania which also published Men's Health, Bicycling, Runner's World, and others. In May 2007, Rodale sold Backpacker to Active Interest Media and the magazine moved to Boulder, Colorado in August 2007. In 2021, Backpacker was acquired by Outside.

== Content ==
Backpacker focuses mostly on backpacking and hiking, but also veers into a wide variety of outdoor sports, including rock climbing, mountain biking, trail running, cycling, and fly fishing. Each issue of Backpacker contains outdoor gear reviews, wilderness and survival tips, trip reports, coverage of specific destinations, and strength and conditioning advice.

== Current status ==
In 2022 Outside shut down all print issues of Backpacker magazine. It is now a fully digital, video focused medium.

Backpacker published six issues per year in 2020.

On May 17, 2007 Active Interest Media, an El Segundo, CA-based magazine publisher, announced that it would buy Backpacker magazine from Rodale, Inc. A May 10 article in the New York Post reported a sale price of $14.5 million. Active Interest Media, which also publishes Yoga Journal and American Cowboy, moved Backpacker to Boulder, CO in the summer of 2007, with Jonathan Dorn as editor-in-chief. In 2013 Dennis Lewon became editor-in-chief.

Backpacker publishes nine issues per year, which includes an annual gear guide in April. Combined issues are published for December–January, February–March, and July–August. The magazine is divided into the service-centric Basecamp section (which won a National Magazine Award for 2005), a feature well, a gear review section, and concludes with maps of local trails corresponding to six regional editions. Every April Backpacker presents its "Editors Choice" awards to highlight the best gear of the year.

Starting in 2004 Backpacker began publishing regional editions of the magazine that include map cards for local trails. The regional concept developed from survey results that showed the magazine's readers were interested in hikes near where they lived. It discontinued these map cards in the April 2008 as part of their effort to become a 100% carbon neutral magazine. The regional sections are now on-line. An all digital version of the magazine was also made available.

In November 2006 Backpacker began posting podcasts and videos on its website to complement the content that appears in the magazine issues. Additional videos appear on Backpacker's YouTube channel.

In April 2007 Backpacker received its third National Magazine Award nomination in two years, this time in the single-topic issue category for its October 2006 "Survival" issue. National Magazine Awards are presented each May by the American Society of Magazine Editors, and are considered the magazine industry's highest editorial honor. Also in 2006 Backpacker received the MIN Best of the Web award in the Uses of Interactivity category for the backpacker.com/hikes website.

In May 2008 Backpacker won a first-ever National Magazine Award for "General Excellence" in the circulation category, 250,000 to 500,000.

Backpacker is also used as part of the American Hiking Society's membership package.

Backpacker's primary competition in the magazine world includes Outside and Men's Journal.
