= Gil Schwartz =

American humor columnist (1951–2020)

- Born: May 20, 1951; New York City, U.S.
- Died: May 2, 2020 (aged 68); Santa Monica, California, U.S.
- Other name: Stanley Bing
- Education: Brandeis University (BA)

Gil Schwartz (May 20, 1951 – May 2, 2020), known by his pen name Stanley Bing, was an American business humorist and novelist. He wrote a column for Fortune magazine for more than twenty years after a decade at Esquire magazine. He was the author of thirteen books, including What Would Machiavelli Do? and The Curriculum, a satirical textbook for a business school that also offers lessons on the web. Schwartz was senior executive vice president of corporate communications and Chief Communications Officer for CBS.

== Early life and education ==
Schwartz was born May 20, 1951, in New York City, and was raised in New Rochelle, New York. He earned a Bachelor of Arts degree in English and Theatre Arts from Brandeis University.

== Career ==
After graduating from college, Schwartz intended to become a playwright. He was a co-founder of Next Move Theatre, an improv troupe based in Boston. Schwartz later landed a communications job at Westinghouse Broadcasting, where he worked for 14 years. In 1996, following CBS' merger with Westinghouse Broadcasting Group, Schwartz joined CBS as senior VP of communications. During his career, he was credited with advising many of CBS's senior executives. Following nearly 40 years at CBS, Viacom and Westinghouse Broadcasting, Schwartz retired in November 2018.

=== Writing ===
Schwartz was a columnist, novelist, and writer of a large body of work dedicated to exploring the relationship between pathology and authority. He first appeared in the pages of Esquire with a one-page column at the back of the magazine on corporate strategies. In a few years, he moved to the front of the magazine and began a series of 2500-word essays, mainly focused on business-related topics.

His first book was a satirical collection of business terms called Bizwords, based on the concept of The Devil's Dictionary. Crazy Bosses, which established the early groundwork for his subsequent career, was published in 1992. At that point Schwartz, who had been writing in secret within a large multinational corporation, revealed his alter ego to colleagues at Westinghouse, who had until then known him only by his given name. Thereafter, he continued to appear as Schwartz in business settings but published primarily under his pseudonym. A series of best-selling business books followed, including What Would Machiavelli Do?: The Ends Justify The Meanness; Throwing The Elephant: Zen and the Art of Managing Up; Sun Tzu Was A Sissy, and, published simultaneously in the spring of 2006, Rome, Inc.: The Rise and Fall of the First Multinational Corporation, and 100 Bullshit Jobs and How To Get Them. In 2007, Schwartz published a thoroughly revised edition of Crazy Bosses, adding a layer of strategy that did not exist in the earlier edition, and in 2008, Executricks: How to Retire While You're Still Working. In 2011, Schwartz published Bingsop's Fables, a version of Aesop's Fables applicable to the business world, populated with corporate archetypes, including The Stupid Investor, the Miserable Misery Mogul, and the Ill-Tempered PR Person. The book was illustrated by Steve Brodner. Schwartz's most recent volume, published in 2014, is The Curriculum: Everything You Need to Know to Be a Master of Business Arts, a 384-page satirical textbook that purportedly provides a complete business education. Illustrated with color PowerPoint graphics, the book includes a core and advanced curriculum, as well as tutorials and electives, with subjects such as "not appearing stupid", "insensitivity training", and "Town Car management".

In a March 2014 interview with Fortune magazine, Schwartz claimed that all of his data came from a think tank he incorporated, The National Association of Serious Studies, which "adheres to the highest standards of Internet journalism."

Schwartz also wrote online. In 2007, he began a daily blog, www.stanleybing.com, which appears on the Fortune website as well as that of its parent, CNNMoney, and also syndicated his writing and video blogs for HuffPost.

=== Identity ===
In 1996, Randall Rothenberg, one of Schwartz's colleagues at Esquire, informed The New York Times that Stanley Bing was actually Gil Schwartz, a CBS executive. The Times published an article under the headline "CBS's Best-Kept Secret (Hint Hint)" revealing Schwartz's identity and noting that he "would probably have been able to keep his Swiftian alter ego a secret, known only to a small circle of friends and colleagues, had he not been so successful at his day job." In the article, Schwartz neither confirmed nor denied the claim that he was Stanley Bing. However former CBS Broadcast Group President Howard Stringer, who was aware of the ruse, compared Schwartz/Bing to Andy Rooney and David Letterman.

Schwartz continued to write the back page for Fortune magazine, while (as Schwartz) holding down a similar post at Men's Health, writing a 2500-word column reminiscent of his earlier work at Esquire.

== Personal life ==
Schwartz was married to Laura Svienty for 14 years. He had two children, two step-children, and two grandchildren. Schwartz and his wife had previously split their time between Manhattan and Mill Valley, California.

Schwartz died on May 2, 2020, at his home in Santa Monica, California, from cardiac arrest. He was 68.

== Published works ==
- Biz Words: Power Talk for Fun and Profit. Pocket Books. 1989. ISBN 978-0-671-67414-4.
- Crazy Bosses: Spotting Them, Serving Them, Surviving Them. Pocket Books. 1992. ASIN B00921ILOK.
- What Would Machiavelli Do? The Ends Justify the Meanness. Collins. 2000. ISBN 978-0-06-662011-4.
- Throwing the Elephant: Zen and the Art of Managing Up. Collins. 2002. ISBN 0-06-018861-8.
- The Big Bing: Black Holes of Time Management, Gaseous Executive Bodies, Exploding Careers, and Other Theories on the Origins of the Business Universe. HarperBusiness. 2003. ISBN 978-0-06-052955-0.
- Sun Tzu Was a Sissy: Conquer Your Enemies, Promote Your Friends, and Wage the Real Art of War. HarperBusiness. 2004. ISBN 0-06-073477-9.
- Rome, Inc. The Rise and Fall of the First Multinational Corporation. W.W. Norton. 2006. ISBN 978-0-393-06026-3.
- 100 Bullshit Jobs ... And How to Get Them. HarperBusiness. 2006. ISBN 978-0-06-073479-4.
- Crazy Bosses: Fully Revised and Updated. HarperBusiness. 2007. ISBN 978-0-06-073157-1.
- Executricks: How to Retire While You're Still Working. HarperBusiness. 2008. ISBN 978-0-06-134035-2.
- Bingsop's Fables: Little Morals for Big Business. HarperBusiness. 2011. ISBN 978-0-06-199852-2.
- The Curriculum: Everything You Need to Know to Be a Master of Business Arts. HarperBusiness. 2014. ISBN 978-0-06-199853-9.

=== Novels ===
- Lloyd: What Happened. Crown. 1998. ISBN 978-0-517-70349-6.
- You Look Nice Today. Bloomsbury USA. 2003. ISBN 978-1-58234-280-1.
- Immortal Life (A Soon To Be True Story). Simon & Schuster. 2017. ISBN 978-1-5011-1983-5.
