= MercBar =

- Location: 151 Mercer Street, New York City, New York, United States
- Owner: John McDonald - Campion Platt
- Type: Bar

Construction
- Opened: 1993; 33 years ago
- Closed: 2013; 13 years ago

MercBar was a bar and lounge located on Mercer Street in Soho. The bar was opened by John McDonald and architect Campion Platt in 1993. It was one of the first lounges of its kind and became a gathering place for the downtown art, fashion, and entertainment world. The bar's original landlord was the Mercer Hotel, located next door.

== History ==
MercBar was opened in 1993 in an old garage and tile warehouse at 151 Mercer Street.

The entrance to the bar was a graffiti-covered red door off to the side, the bar had no sign, and was meant to be hard to find and hard to access for many years.

The bar closed in 2013 when the building was demolished.
