= Rodney W. Nichols =

American physicist

Rodney W. Nichols was an American physicist. From 1992 to 2001, he was the president and CEO of the New York Academy of Sciences. He was a founding member of the nonprofit CO2 Coalition, which works to publicize the supposed benefits of increased levels of atmospheric CO_{2}.
