= Stranger's Guide =

American magazine publisher

Stranger’s Guide
- Editor-in-chief: Kira Brunner Don
- Categories: Literature; travel; lifestyle
- Frequency: 4 issues a year
- Founder: Kira Brunner Don and Abby Rapoport
- Founded: 2018
- Country: United States
- Based in: Austin, Texas
- Language: English
- Website: strangersguide.com
- ISSN: 2639-3638

Stranger's Guide is an American magazine and multi-platform publisher, based in Austin, Texas and Oakland, California. It features articles in the fields of travel, literature, and place-based journalism.

It was founded in 2018 in Austin, as Stranger's Guide, a literary and travel quarterly magazine “that explores the power of place-based journalism to break down stereotypes and foster global citizenship.” Rather than sending reporters into foreign locations, the magazine features original works by local sources. Writers for Stranger's Guide volumes have included renowned journalists and writers such as Elena Poniatowska, Colum McCann, Wole Soyinka, Viet Thanh Nguyen, Dan Rather and Jason Rezaian.

== Praise ==
In 2021 the American Society of Magazine Editors nominated Stranger's Guide in two categories, and it won in both categories, for “General Excellence” and in “Photography.”

In 2022 the organization honored Stranger's Guide with a “General Excellence” award, and it was also again nominated for Photography and for the ASME Award for Fiction.

In 2021, The Best American Travel Writing collection featured work by Courtney Desiree Morris for Stranger's Guide.

== Format and business model ==
The magazine is distributed at Barnes & Noble, Whole Foods Market, and independent bookstores, with the majority of their readership coming from digital-only subscriptions.

== Ownership ==
The magazine is owned and operated by Kira Brunner Don and Abby Rapoport.
