= Emily Nemens =

American writer, editor and illustrator

- Born: Seattle, Washington, U.S.
- Education: Brown University; Louisiana State University
- Occupations: Writer; editor; illustrator
- Website: emilynemens.com

Emily Nemens is an American writer, editor and illustrator. From April 2018 to March 2021 she served as the editor of The Paris Review.

== Life and education ==
Born in Seattle, Nemens studied art history and studio art at Brown University. At Louisiana State University she received a degree in creative writing.

== Career ==
Nemens is an alumna of the Kerouac Project writing residency in Orlando, Florida, where she completed a short-story collection called “Scrub.” Nemens worked as an editor at the Center for Architecture and the Metropolitan Museum of Art in New York. In Louisiana, she worked at The Southern Review and became its co-editor.

In April 2018, then still widely unknown in the New York literary scene, she was appointed editor of The Paris Review by a five-person committee composed of Susannah Hunnewell, Akash Shah, Jeanne McCulloch, Jeffrey Eugenides, and Mona Simpson. She succeeded Lorin Stein, who had resigned after allegations of sexual harassment. She was the second woman to lead the Review (after Brigid Hughes, who eschewed the official "editor" title out of respect for her predecessor, and the journal's founder, the late George Plimpton). In March 2021, she wrote that she was leaving the magazine to write her next book.

== Work ==
Nemens has published poetry, fiction and essays in n+1, Esquire and The Gettysburg Review.

As an illustrator, she has obtained a large following for her watercolor portraits of female politicians on Tumblr.

Nemens published her debut novel, The Cactus League, in 2020.
