= National Geographic Adventure (magazine) =

Magazine of the National Geographic Society

- December 2009/January 2010 issue front cover showing Geoff Tabin
- Editor in chief: John Rasmus
- First issue: Spring 1999
- Final issue: December 2009
- Company: National Geographic Society
- Country: United States
- Based in: Washington, DC
- Language: English
- Website: www.nationalgeographic.com/adventure/
- ISSN: 1523-6226

National Geographic Adventure was a magazine started in 1999 by the National Geographic Society in the United States. The first issue was published in Spring 1999. Regular publication of the magazine ended in December 2009, and the name was reused for a biannual newsstand publication. The last issue was December 2009/January 2010.

== Features ==
The magazine covered adventure travel, environmental issues, natural science, and other topics related to the outdoors. It focused on adventure travel and included:

Regular features

- "First In", that featured recent adventure travel news
- "Gear", that featured experts' recommendations of good gear that would improve ones' vacation experience
- "Living It" that featured Adventure tips, ways to avoid danger, ways to help, etc.
- "Next Weekend", that featured good weekend trips from all across the U.S.
- "Where Next", that featured vacation destinations across the world

Adventurer of the Year

Annually, a slate of adventurers were named National Geographic Adventure Adventurer of the Year", in a variety of categories. For example, the December 2008/January 2009 issue named "Fourteen people who dreamed big, pushed their limits, and made our year". One, Pemba Gyalje Sherpa, was named for "extreme heroism under trying extreme circumstances" for repeatedly risking his life to successfully rescue several mountaineers stranded on the mountain, during the 2008 K2 disaster.

== Masthead ==
John Rasmus served as the editor-in-chief of the magazine from its inception to its closure. Sam Serebin and Tom Bentkowski were the design team responsible for the initial prototype and first six issues of the magazine.
