= Glenn Zorpette =

Electrical engineer

Glenn Zorpette is an electrical engineer with IEEE Spectrum Magazine in New York, New York. He was named a Fellow of the Institute of Electrical and Electronics Engineers (IEEE) in 2013 for his contributions to professional communication in electrical and electronic technology.
