= Lee Eisenberg (author) =

American editor and author

Lee Eisenberg (born July 22, 1946) is an American editor and author. He was the editor-in-chief of Esquire magazine throughout the 1970s and 1980s. Eisenberg is the author of several books, including The Number: A Completely Different Way to Think About the Rest of Your Life, which appeared on many national bestseller lists. His latest book is The Point Is: Birth, Death, and Everything in Between, published in February, 2016 by Twelve Books, an imprint of the Hachette Book Group.

== Education ==
A Philadelphia native, Eisenberg was inducted into the Central High School hall of fame in 1988 in celebration of the school's 150th anniversary. He went on to study at the University of Pennsylvania, graduating in 1968, and then received a master's degree at the Annenberg School for Communication.

== Early career ==
=== Esquire ===
Shortly before completing his education, Eisenberg entered a contest and won a job as a junior editor at Esquire magazine. The contest, devised by then editor Harold Hayes, required entrants to rewrite headlines and captions of that month's issue of Esquire (October, 1969).

Eisenberg climbed the ranks at the magazine quickly and was promoted to editor-in-chief in 1973. During his tenure, he led the magazine to numerous National Magazine Awards in various categories, including General Excellence, Reporting, and Design.

Throughout his two decades at Esquire, Eisenberg edited a diverse array of writers, including Truman Capote, Norman Mailer, Richard Ford, Nora Ephron, Gay Talese, Irwin Shaw, Albert Brooks, and Jodie Foster, among others. Ephron, in the acknowledgements of her collection of essays, Crazy Salad, referred to Eisenberg as “the best magazine editor I have ever worked with.”

In 1990, Eisenberg relocated to London where he served as the founding editor of Esquire UK.

=== Power Lunch ===
Eisenberg coined the term “power lunch” in a 1979 Esquire article entitled “America’s Most Powerful Lunch.” Power lunch was initially used in the article to describe the happenings at The Four Seasons Restaurant at noontime. It is now commonly used to refer to the kind of lunch during which business is discussed and big deals are often brokered.

=== Edison Project ===
In 1991, Eisenberg was asked to serve as one of the six founding partners of the Edison project, a privately run initiative that aimed to create a national system of private schools, K-12.

== Later career ==
=== Time, Inc. ===
In 1995, Eisenberg joined Time Inc. where he served as a consulting editor of strategic development. His projects included the launch of a variety of special projects, including Time.com, Time for Kids, as well as a series of special issues. He played a major role in creating the Time 100, a chronicle in collaboration with CBS News of the leading men and women of the Twentieth Century.

=== Lands' End ===
Eisenberg was named Executive Vice President and Creative Director at Lands' End in 1999. There, he oversaw all creative endeavors, both online and in print. He resigned after five years to focus on book projects.

=== Books & speaking engagements ===
Eisenberg's first book was The Number, A Completely Different Way to Think About the Rest of Your Life. Published in 2006, The Number looks at how people prepare for retirement and urges readers to consider framing the question of how much they will need in terms of personal satisfaction. The book was listed on numerous national bestseller lists, including The New York Times, The Wall Street Journal, Business Week, and USA Today. Business Week cited it as one of the Best Business Books of 2006.

In 2009, Eisenberg published Shoptimism: Why the American Consumer Will Keep on Buying No Matter What, published by Free Press/Simon & Schuster. The book is a journey through the materialism and acquisition, looking at both the marketing and emotional aspects of consumption.

He's also the author of Breaking Eighty: A Journey Through the Nine Fairways of Hell (1987), which Gary McCord of CBS called "a lively account of every player's maddening attempt to master the world's most irresistible game."

"The Point Is: Birth, Death, and Everything in Between" was cited by Publishers Weekly as one of the top-ten books in its category.

As a public speaker, Eisenberg has appeared at events in the US and abroad, presenting views on financial planning, consumerism, and cultural values and trends.

== Other ==
=== Rotisserie League ===
Eisenberg was one of the founding fathers of Rotisserie League Baseball, the precursor to fantasy sports. An account of the creation of the Rotisserie League was chronicled in the 2010 documentary Silly Little Game, produced by ESPN for its "30 for 30" series.

=== Academic affiliations ===
Eisenberg has served on the faculty of the University of Pennsylvania as a visiting scholar. He also established a Literary Journalism fellowship at the Center for Programs in Contemporary Writing at the University of Pennsylvania. He was also a Scholar-in-Residence at the Newberry Library, Chicago.

=== Web Site ===
LeeEisenberg.com

== Bibliography ==
- Sneaky Feats: The Art of Showing Off and 53 Ways To Do It (co-author, with Tom Ferrell) (1975)
- Giant Book of Sneaky Feats: The Art of Showing Off and 102 New Ways To Do It (co-author, with Tom Ferrell) (1980)
- The Ultimate Fishing Book (co-author, with Decourcy Taylor) (1991)
- Atlantic City: One Hundred Twenty-Five Years of Ocean Madness (co-author, with Vicki G. Levy) (1994)
- Breaking Eighty: A Journey Through the 9 Fairways of Hell (1997)
- The Number: A Completely Different Way to Think About the Rest of Your Life (2006)
- Shoptimism: Why the American Consumer Will Keep on Buying No Matter What (2009)
- The Point Is: Making Sense of Birth, Death, and Everything in Between (2016)
