= Caroline Suh =

American documentary director and producer

- Occupations: Director, producer
- Years active: 2008 – present

Caroline Suh is an American documentary film director and producer. She is best known for her work on the documentaries WORKING: WHAT WE DO ALL DAY, which she made with President Obama, Frontrunners, Salt Fat Acid Heat, Blackpink: Light Up the Sky, and Sorry/Not Sorry.

== Career ==
In 2008, Suh made her directing debut with the documentary film, Frontrunners, premiered at South by Southwest. She directed 2 episodes and produced 4 episodes of season 6 of Iconoclasts. In 2016, She directed the documentary short, The 4%: Film's Gender Problem, about the lack of female directors in Hollywood, premiered on Epix.

Suh adapted the book by Samin Nosrat for a Netflix docu-series, Salt Fat Acid Heat, which she also directed. Most recently she directed the Netflix documentary film, Blackpink: Light Up the Sky, about the South Korean girl group Blackpink

Suh developed and directed the Netflix series WORKING: What We Do All Day, featuring President Obama and produced by his company Higher Ground. NPR's David Bianculli called it "flawless" and "the best TV documentary about jobs and workers since Edward R. Murrow's "Harvest Of Shame" on CBS. And that was more than 60 years ago."

In 2023, Suh directed and produced the documentary Sorry/Not Sorry with the New York times, alongside Cara Mones, revolving around allegations of sexual misconduct made against Louis C.K. and the affect his comeback has on those who've come forward. It premiered at the 2023 Toronto International Film Festival in September 2023 and was released by Greenwich Films.

== Filmography ==
Year	Film	Director	Producer	Note
2008	Frontrunners	Yes		Documentary
2012	Iconoclasts	Yes	Yes	Documentary series
2014	Whitey: United States of America v. James J. Bulger		Yes	Documentary
2016	Cooked	Yes	Yes	Documentary series
2016	The 4%: Film's Gender Problem	Yes	Yes	Documentary short
2018	Salt Fat Acid Heat	Yes	Yes	Documentary Series
2020	Blackpink: Light Up the Sky	Yes		Documentary
2023	Sorry/Not Sorry	Yes	Yes	Documentary

== Awards and nominations ==
Year	Result	Award	Category	Work	Ref.
2008	Nominated	South by Southwest	Best Documentary Feature	Frontrunners	
2010	Nominated	International Documentary Association	Best Limited Series	Cooked	
2016	Nominated	Cinema Eye Honors	Outstanding Achievement in Nonfiction Filmmaking for Television	Whitey: United States of America v. James J. Bulger	
2020	Nominated	Cinema Eye Honors	Outstanding Achievement in Nonfiction Series for Broadcast	Salt Fat Acid Heat	
