= Slonie žrádlo =

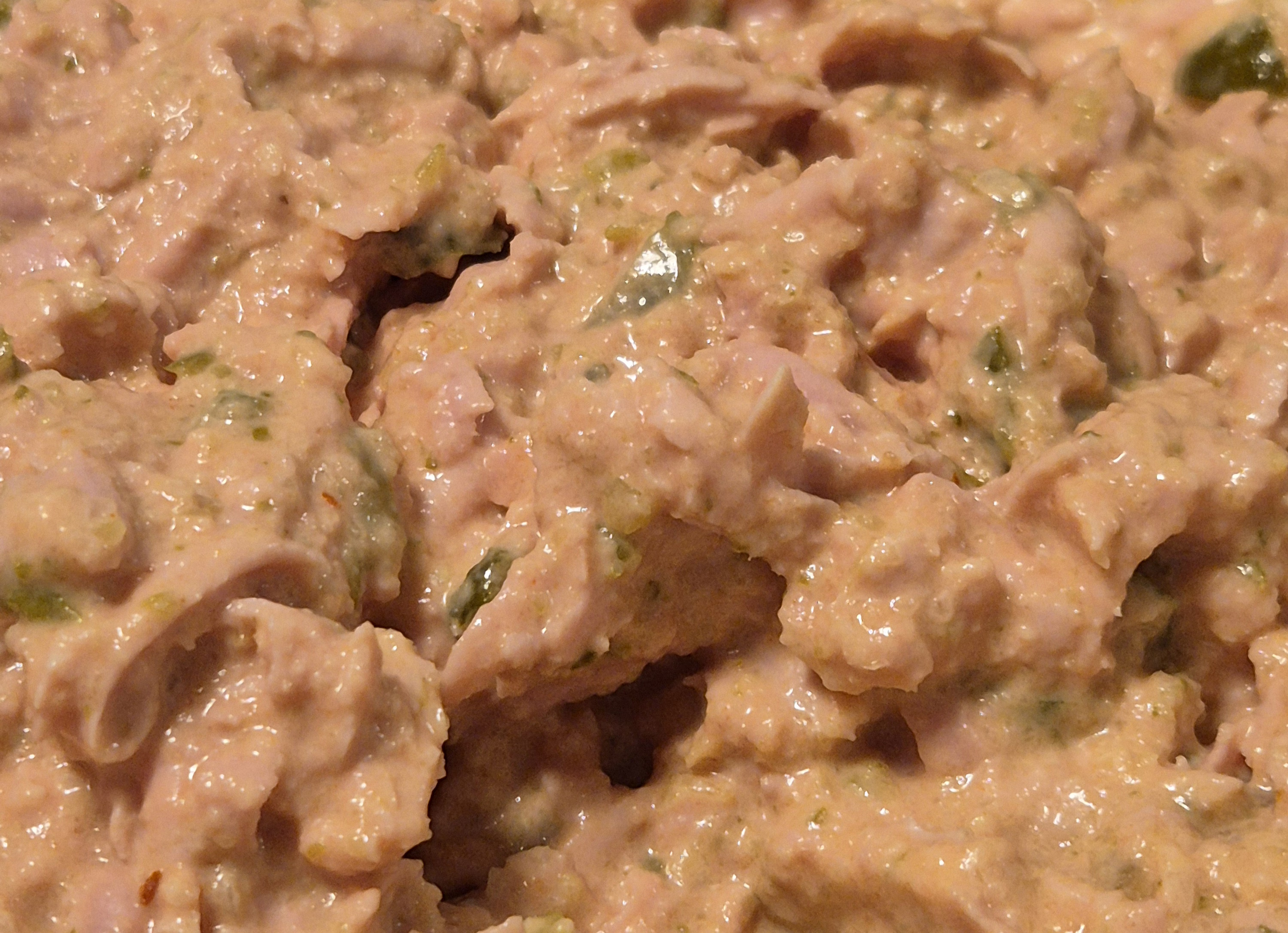
- Alternative names: Sloní žrádlo (Czech)
- Type: spread or salad
- Place of origin: unknown
- Region or state: Czechoslovakia
- Associated cuisine: Slovak cuisine; Czech cuisine
- Created by: unknown
- Invented: unknown
- Serving temperature: cold
- Main ingredients: vegetable oil, ketchup, mustard, soy sauce, Worcestershire sauce, salt, pepper, parizer or ham, eggs, pickled cucumber, onions, pickled cucumber brine, mayonnaise
- Ingredients generally used: corn, fresh tomatoes, hard cheese
- Food energy (per 100 g serving): 253 kcal (1,060 kJ)
Nutritional value
(per 100 g serving)
- Protein: 10 g
- Fat: 21.9 g
- Carbohydrate: 3.25 g
- Similar dishes: camping salát

Slonie žrádlo (Slovak pronunciation: ['sloɲɪe 'ʐraːdlɔ], in Slovakia) or sloní žrádlo (Slovak pronunciation: ['sloɲɪː 'ʒraːdlo], in Czech Republic, literally "elephant food"), is a type of Czechoslovak spread or salad of unknown origin. The probable name origin is linked to its quantity "as for elephants" (ako pre slony). It is prepared with cooked mixture of vegetable oil, ketchup, mustard, soy sauce, Worcestershire sauce, salt and pepper which is mixed with parizer or ham, eggs, pickled cucumber, onions, we can also add corn, tomatoes, diced hard cheese, and pickled cucumber brine with mayonnaise.

Slonie žrádlo is typically spread on a slice of veka, fresh bread and also on toasted old bread. It is usually served during visits and on New Year's Eve (Silvester).
