= Good Things (book) =

2025 cookbook by Samin Nosrat

- Author: Samin Nosrat
- Genre: Cookbook
- Published: September 18, 2025 (Random House)

Good Things: Recipes and Rituals to Share With People You Love is a cookbook by Samin Nosrat, published on September 18, 2025 by Random House.

== Background ==
The book was published eight years after Nosrat's first cookbook, Salt Fat Acid Heat. Nosrat originally intended to follow-up her first book with a sequel titled What to Cook, which would have focused on how to decide what to prepare to eat based on your time, resources, preferences, and ingredients. She eventually abandoned the idea after struggling to complete the book. Based on the advice of a literary agent, she decided to publish a cookbook that more resembled a recipe book than her first book, which focused on teaching techniques. The book's title was inspired by the short story "A Small Good Thing" by Raymond Carver.

Nosrat suffered from clinical depression during the COVID-19 lockdowns following the success of her first book and the cooking show based on it, and the death of her father. She began hosting a weekly dinner party with her friends as a way to connect, and began compiling recipes which were used in Good Things. When writing the book, Nosrat also chose to emphasize the enjoyment of cooking and sharing food with others. The photographs used in the book were taken at Nosrat's home in Oakland, using her tableware and linens.

== Reception ==
In December 2025, the book was in fourth place on The Washington Post's non-fiction hardcover bestseller's list. It was in ninth place on the Los Angeles Times' non-fiction bestseller list in January 2026. The book was included on Smithsonian's top ten books about food of 2025, and The New Yorker's list of the top ten cookbooks of 2025.

Micheline Maynard of Food & Wine considered it to be part of a wave of cookbooks published after the COVID-19 pandemic that focused on simple cooking and the importance of social dining.
