= Blackpink: Light Up the Sky =

2020 documentary film starring Blackpink

- Official release poster
- Directed by: Caroline Suh
- Produced by: Cara Mones
- Starring: Kim Ji-soo; Jennie Kim; Roseanne Park; Lalisa Manoban; Teddy Park
- Cinematography: Luke McCoubrey
- Edited by: Peter Holmes
- Production company: RadicalMedia
- Distributed by: Netflix
- Release date: October 14, 2020
- Running time: 79 minutes
- Countries: South Korea; United States
- Languages: Korean; English; Thai

Blackpink: Light Up the Sky (Korean: 세상을 밝혀라; RR: Sesangeul balkyeora, stylized as BLACKPINK: Light Up the Sky) is a 2020 documentary film directed by Caroline Suh, that tells the story of South Korean girl group Blackpink as bandmates and as individuals, and details their rise to fame. The documentary film was released just under two weeks after the release of Blackpink's first studio album The Album, and has been described as "an endearing documentary that emphasizes each member's individuality".

Blackpink: Light Up the Sky was released worldwide on Netflix on October 14, 2020. It is Blackpink's first documentary and Netflix's first K-pop original content.

== Synopsis ==
The all-access documentary covers the four years since Blackpink's debut in 2016 with video footages from their training days, a look into their day-to-day life, behind-the-scenes stories, and interviews with the members. It follows the trials and tribulations of being a K-pop star, the recording process of the group's debut album The Album and member Rosé's then-upcoming solo debut, and culminates with their 2019 Coachella performance.

== Cast ==
- Blackpink
- Teddy Park, record producer
- Joe Rhee, record producer

== Background ==
The K-pop phenomenon has been sweeping the globe and Blackpink has arguably become the most recognizable and most popular girl group in the world. Director Caroline Suh's trusted relationship with Jisoo, Jennie, Rosé, and Lisa offers organic and honest moments that give viewers an authentic inside look into the lives of Blackpink, as well as the dedication and grueling preparation each member puts into every hit song, history-making performance and sold-out arena tour. We're thrilled to bring their story to their fans worldwide.

— Adam Del Deo, Vice President of Documentary Features at Netflix

The documentary film was directed by Caroline Suh, the Emmy-nominated filmmaker of Netflix docuseries Salt Fat Acid Heat, produced by Cara Mones, and executive produced by RadicalMedia. The project was brought to Carolina Suh by Netflix, as the company had been working with Blackpink to develop their first K-pop project. The film was shot over two periods of time, with the first period in the fall of 2019 and the second period in February 2020 before the COVID-19 pandemic became a global issue. The archive footages of Blackpink's training days were provided by the group's agency YG Entertainment. Speaking about the film, Suh hoped the documentary "humanizes all of the Blackpink members and that people can kind of see them as three dimensional people rather than just these idols or icons."

During the film's global press conference, member Rosé revealed that the title Light Up the Sky came up during the shoot while they were in the studio, and it was one of the lyrics of the group's song "How You Like That".

== Promotion ==
On September 8, 2020, Netflix and Blackpink announced the premiere of Blackpink: Light Up the Sky on their social media accounts. The official trailer was dropped on October 5 on Netflix's YouTube channel and its other social media accounts.

Ahead of the film's release, Blackpink held a global press conference in Seoul, joined by director Caroline Suh from New York City through videoconference on October 13. The event was livestreamed due to concerns over the COVID-19 pandemic. Upon the release of the film on October 14, profile icons of all four Blackpink members were made available on Netflix.

== Reception ==
=== Audience viewership ===
The film ranked first on Netflix upon release in 28 out of 78 countries and regions. According to Netflix, it was the most viewed documentary across Asia, specifically Indonesia, Malaysia, Singapore, South Korea, Hong Kong, and Thailand.

=== Critical response ===
On the review aggregation website Rotten Tomatoes, the film holds an approval rating of 94% based on 16 reviews, with an average rating of 6.9/10.

Natalie Winkelman of The New York Times called the film an "endearing documentary that emphasizes each member's individuality" as it "draws a line from the challenging lives Blackpink led as trainees to the pressure and loneliness they now face as global celebrities", but criticized on how the film declined to "dig deeper into the ways YG engineers and commercializes talent at such a young age". The Ringer's Kate Halliwell praised the film director saying that Suh "cuts through K-pop's strongest stereotypes to get to the truth behind not only the group, but the four unique women who make it." Kate Erbland of IndieWire gave the film a "B" rating, calling the film "glossy and fun" and that although the film offered an "intimate introduction" to Blackpink and "deeper insights about the price of fame", it didn't gloss much over to the other side of K-pop and lacked "in-depth examination of the "trainee" experience".

=== Accolades ===
Award	Category	Recipient(s) and nominee(s)	Result	Ref(s)
SEC Awards	Best Documentary	Blackpink: Light Up the Sky	Won	

== See also ==
- List of original films distributed by Netflix
