= Wendy MacNaughton =

American illustrator and graphic journalist

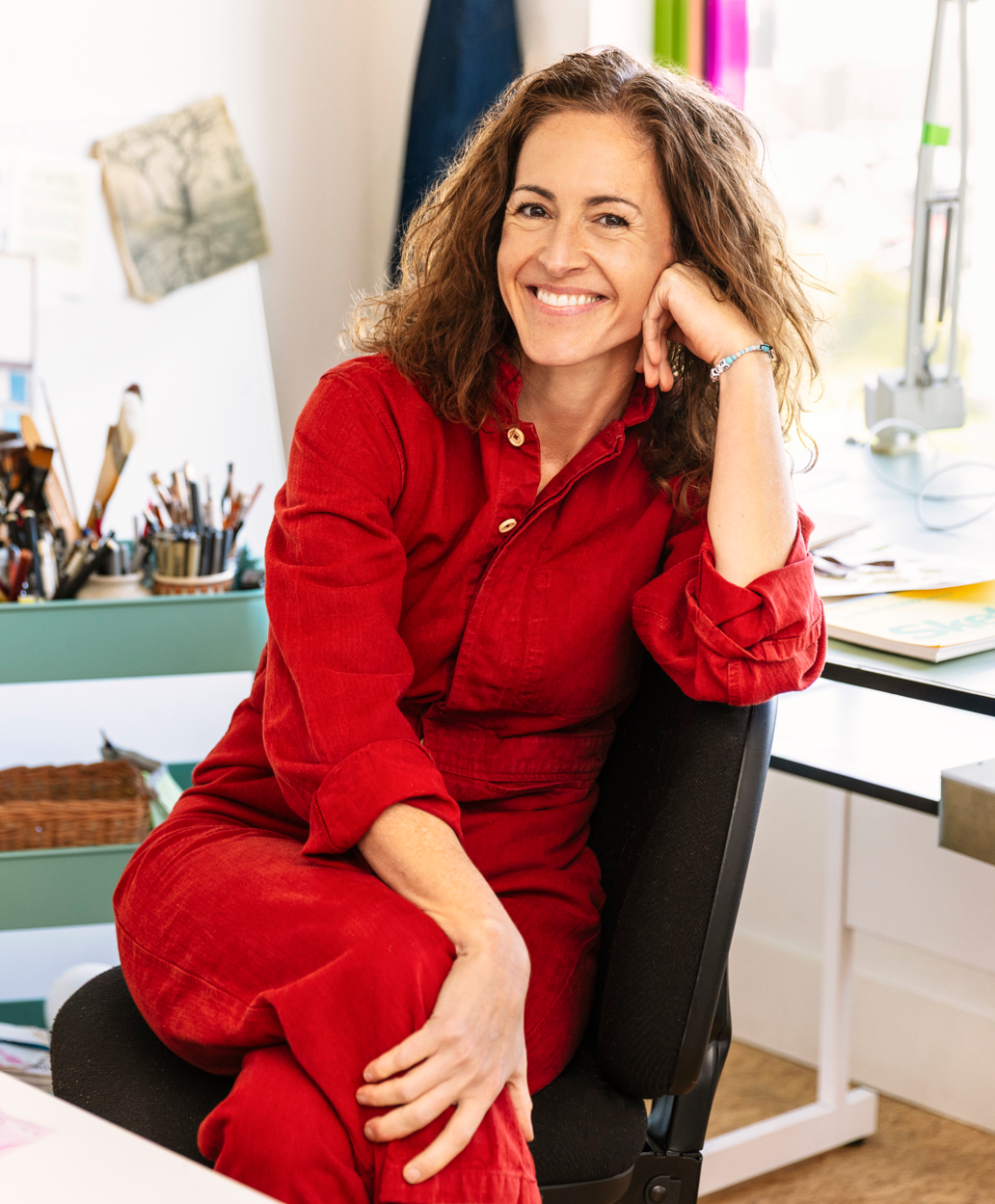
- Born: San Francisco, California, U.S.
- Education: Art Center College of Design; Columbia University
- Known for: Drawing, Illustration, Comics journalism, Graphic Journalism
- Spouse: Caroline Paul separated
- Website: wendymacnaughton.com

Wendy MacNaughton is an American artist, illustrator, graphic journalist, and educator based in San Francisco She has published eleven books, including three New York Times bestsellers. Her work integrates drawing and social work practices to emphasize close observation, connection, and the experiences of overlooked individuals and communities. Her illustrated documentary series Meanwhile was The New York Times first weekly column of drawn journalism. MacNaughton is the creator and host of DrawTogether, a multimedia participatory arts and social-emotional learning initiative for children and grown-ups.

== Early life and education ==
MacNaughton was born in San Francisco, California. She earned a Bachelor of Fine Arts (BFA) from the ArtCenter College of Design in Pasadena in 1999, and a Master of Science in Social Work (MSW) from Columbia University in 2005.

== Career ==
After a lifetime of drawing and earning a BFA, MacNaughton worked as a copywriter in corporate advertising. In 2000, she left to work with the Government of Rwanda and USAID, designing, drawing, and producing the national educational and sensitization campaign for the country's first free and fair elections. She later partnered with NGOs and academic institutions to create visual educational campaigns promoting civic engagement and health in Rwanda, the Democratic Republic of Congo, and Northern Kenya. In the late 2000s, she returned to a career in the arts, applying her experience in social work, storytelling, and education to a drawing-based social practice.

== Visual Journalism ==
In 2010, MacNaughton created the drawn journalism series Meanwhile, documenting life and institutions in San Francisco. The series first appeared in The Rumpus, and several stories were later collected into the book Meanwhile in San Francisco: The City in Its Own Words (2014). A review in the San Francisco Chronicle compared MacNaughton's work to that of oral historian Studs Terkel and she was profiled in The Atlantic's issue "How Genius Happens."

The Meanwhile series became the back-page column for California Sunday Magazine, and MacNaughton later became the first weekly visual columnist for the New York Times, with Meanwhile appearing in the Sunday Business section. For that column, she built a mobile studio in the back of a Honda Element and traveled across the United States, meeting and drawing people for the series.

Her book of visual journalism How to Say Goodbye (2023), combined drawings and interviews from her year-long residency at the Zen Hospice Project to document the experiences of caregivers and residents in end-of-life care. The book, originally published in 2019 as an artists book and later published by Bloomsbury with an introduction by BJ Miller, was described by Atul Gawande as a poem to mortality and the beauty of how we cope with it. NPR selected it as a 2023 Books We Love calling it Tenderly illustrated... a beautiful reminder that death is a part of living and that we can learn from it… This guide about dying reminds the living to embrace the present and deepen our relationships.

== Women Who Draw ==
In 2016, MacNaughton co-founded Women Who Draw with illustrator Julia Rothman, a directory and advocacy platform for women, trans, and nonbinary illustrators. The platform helped shift the landscape of illustration by increasing visibility and professional opportunities for underrepresented artists Women Who Draw concluded in 2025.

== DrawTogether ==
In March 2020, on the first day of school closures in the San Francisco Bay Area, MacNaughton launched DrawTogether. The initial program consisted of live, interactive online drawing sessions on Instagram grounded in social work practices, attended by thousands of participants worldwide, filmed by her then-wife, author Caroline Paul.

MacNaughton went on to lead the creation of a physical, full-scale, hand-made set and produced an educational video series for kids, with videos filmed and co-produced by Caroline Paul.

=== DrawTogether Classrooms ===
DrawTogether Videos served as the foundation for DrawTogether Classrooms, a nonprofit educational initiative providing free art and social-emotional learning programming to educators and students, including videos, podcasts, curricula, and support, with Spanish and Chinese translations. By 2025, DrawTogether Classrooms had reached nearly 300,000 learners worldwide.

DrawTogether has been featured on PBS NewsHour and New York Magazine.

DrawTogether was featured in MacNaughton's TED Talk, The Art of Paying Attention, which has been viewed over four million times.

=== DrawTogether Grown-Ups Table ===
The Grown-Ups Table is the adult-facing programming of DrawTogether, offering art and social emotional learning and community building opportunities to a grown-up audience. Hosted on the Substack platform, it is also used by educators and followed by more than 100,000 people as of 2025.

=== DrawTogether Strangers ===
DrawTogether Strangers began in 2023 with MacNaughton setting up a folding table and cardboard sign, and inviting strangers to sit down and look closely at one another through drawing. She traveled across the United States hosting the experience in public spaces, later offering a free toolkit for people to host DrawTogether Strangers in their own community. The project has been profiled by The New York Times and hosted by the National Gallery of Art in Washington, D.C., and the de Young Museum in San Francisco. The National Gallery created a short film about the project, highlighting its impact on empathy, connection, and interpersonal awareness.

== Coverage of the Guantanamo Military Commission ==
In December 2019 MacNaughton was tapped to supply illustration to supplement The New York Times coverage of the Guantanamo Military Commissions. During its sixteen years of operation the US Department of Defense had only approved four earlier illustrators. MacNaughton had to undergo a security check, and had to agree to a strict set of rules and other restrictions.

MacNaughton wrote that Carol Rosenberg, the reporter she was working with, had warned her she could not really understand how covering Guantanamo would affect her, until she experienced it herself. She wrote that there was a list of items that she could not include in her drawings, without making it was obvious something had been left out. When the officer assigned to approve her work went through her drawings he required her to surrender her hand-written copy of the restricted list, even though it was not classified, and had been previously published.

MacNaughton described only understanding the days proceedings later, when reporters explained it to her. She described covering the court as so stressful that she took up smoking again, even though she had quit ten years previously.

Rosenberg wrote that, when he knew MacNaughton was not present, drawing the court, Khalid Sheikh Mohammed went back to adding a combat jacket over his traditional Islamic robes.

== Selected Books ==
=== Author and Illustrator ===
How to Say Goodbye (2023), written and illustrated by Wendy MacNaughton. Published by Bloomsbury. The book was a finalist for the California Book Award, selected for NPR's Books We Love, and became a USA Today bestseller, and received a starred Review from Bookpage. ISBN 978-1-63973-085-8 OCLC 1377818710

Meanwhile in San Francisco: The City in Its Own Words (2014), written and illustrated by Wendy MacNaughton. Published by Chronicle Books. ISBN 978-1-4521-1389-0 OCLC 855905559

=== Illustrator ===
Salt, Fat, Acid, Heat (2017), written by Samin Nosrat and illustrated by Wendy MacNaughton. Published by Simon & Schuster. The book won the James Beard Award for Best General Cookbook and the IACP Cookbook of the Year Award. ISBN 978-1-4767-5383-6 OCLC 952647644

The Gutsy Girl (2016), written by Caroline Paul and illustrated by Wendy MacNaughton. Published by Bloomsbury. The book was a New York Times bestseller. ISBN 978-1-63286-123-8 OCLC 907966106

Knives & Ink: Chefs' Tattoos and the Stories Behind Them (2016), edited by Isaac Fitzgerald, with illustrations by Wendy MacNaughton. The book won the IACP award for design. Published by Bloomsbury. ISBN 978-1-63286-121-4 OCLC 945549917

Pen & Ink: Tattoos and the Stories Behind Them (2014), edited by Isaac Fitzgerald, with illustrations by Wendy MacNaughton. Published by Bloomsbury. 14 best books of 2014 by Brain Pickings. ISBN 978-1-62040-490-4 OCLC 870098122

Lost Cat (2013), written by Caroline Paul and illustrated by Wendy MacNaughton. Published by Bloomsbury. The book was a finalist for the Lambda Literary Award. ISBN 978-1-60819-977-8 OCLC 795174361

=== Editor ===
Leave Me Alone with the Recipes: The Life, Art, and Cookbook of Cipe Pineles (2017), co-edited by Wendy MacNaughton, Sarah Rich, Debbie Millman, and Maria Popova. Published by Bloomsbury. ISBN 978-1-60819-977-8 OCLC 795174361

== Awards and Fellowships ==
- 2026: MacDowell Residency, Peterborough, NH
- 2025: Appointment, The Lancet Commission on U.S. Societal Resilience in a Global Pandemic Age
- 2025: Storyteller in Residence, National Gallery of Art, Washington DC
- 2023: Medalist, Council for Advancement and Support of Education (CASE) Circle of Excellence Awards, "Drawing Connections with Wendy MacNaughton", Columbia Magazine
- 2023: NPR's Books We Love, How to Say Goodbye
- 2023: California Book Award, Finalist; How to Say Goodbye
- 2020: Best of Illustration, New York Times: Clothing and Culture at Guantanamo Bay
- 2019: San Francisco Library Laureate
- 2018: Dudley Memorial Lecturer, Corcoran School of the Arts & Design
- 2017: James Beard Award, Best General Cookbook; Cookbook of the Year, IACP; Salt, Fat, Acid, Heat
- 2014: IACP Design Award, Knives & Ink
- 2014: Finalist, LAMBDA Literary Award, Lost Cat
- 2013: The Best American Infographics
- 2013: Best American Non-Required Reading
- 2011: Outstanding Service Alumni Award, ArtCenter College of Design
- 2011: Awesome Foundation Grant, San Francisco Public Library Book Project
- 2009: Artist in Residence, Intersection for the Arts

== Personal life ==
MacNaughton lives in San Francisco. After 15 years of marriage to her wife, writer Caroline Paul, the two separated in 2023. MacNaughton and Paul collaborated on two books: Lost Cat and The Gutsy Girl.
