= Caroline Paul =

American writer

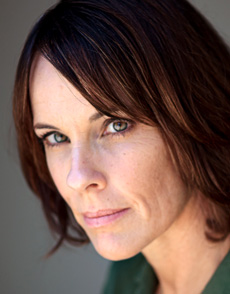
- Born: July 29, 1963 (age 63); New York City, U.S.
- Education: Stanford University
- Occupation: Writer
- Spouse: Wendy MacNaughton (m. 2018)
- Relatives: Alexandra Paul (identical twin)
- Writing career
- Genres: Fiction; non-fiction

Caroline Paul (born July 29, 1963, in New York City) is an American writer of fiction and non-fiction.

== Early years and education ==
Caroline Paul was raised in New York City; Paris, France; and Cornwall, Connecticut. Her American father was an investment banker, and her mother was a social worker from the United Kingdom. She was educated in journalism and documentary film at Stanford University.

== Career ==
Paul volunteered as a journalist at Berkeley public radio station KPFA, then in 1988, joined the San Francisco Fire Department, as one of the first women hired by the department. She worked most of her career on the search and rescue team.

Her first book was the nonfiction memoir Fighting Fire, published in 1998. It was a finalist at the Northern California Book Awards and an alternate selection for the Book of the Month Club. Her second, the 2006 historical novel East Wind, Rain is based on the Niihau incident, a historical event in which a Japanese pilot crash-landed on the private Hawaiian island of Niihau, after the attack on Pearl Harbor. "When it's over, we don't want to leave," said the New York Times review of the book. Lost Cat, A True Story of Love, Desperation, and GPS Technology was published in 2013 and illustrated by her partner, artist Wendy MacNaughton. It details Paul and MacNaughton's high-tech search for their cat. The PBS Newshour described the book as "A thoughtful, kind and funny story about the love people can have for their pets and the weird places that this love and accompanying devotion can take them. But it also travels beyond the realm of human-pet relationships, offering commentary on all relationships and the roles of those we love, and sometimes don't love, in our lives."

In 2016, Paul published the New York Times bestseller The Gutsy Girl, Escapades for Your Life of Epic Adventure. The book is described as "Lean in for middle grade girls, set not in the workplace but on bicycles, tree branches, sea kayaks, and cliff edges... Part memoir, part how-to-outdoors guide, (it) offers life lessons through adventure stories." She published a New York Times oped that spoke to parents about the themes raised in The Gutsy Girl called, Why Do We Teach Girls It’s Cute to be Scared that quickly became viral.

Paul did in 2016 a TED talk on the subject of raising healthy, confident girls by encouraging bravery, which has over 2 million views.

In 2018 Paul collaborated with tea expert Sebastian Beckwith, and published A Little Tea Book.

During the pandemic, Paul collaborated with MacNaughton on DrawTogether, a half hour Instagram Live art class conceived and hosted by MacNaughton, with the goal of helping kids and parents through the school closures. Paul filmed the show with a camera phone, and also edited filmed interviews and other content. Draw Together reached tens of thousands of kids around the world and ran for over a year, with 70 half hour shows in all.

During that time Paul also wrote her latest book, Tough Broad: From Boogie Boarding to Wing Walking, How Outdoor Adventure Improves Our Lives as We Age. Paul looks at the latest research and social science on aging, and embarks on adventures that range from scuba diving with an octagenarean, to hiking with a 93-year-old, to birdwatching. The book argues that a relationship with the outdoors profoundly changes bodies and minds, especially those of women in later years. Swimmer Diana Nyad says of the Tough Broad, "this arc of a critical life blueprint comes from the toughest broad I know, Caroline Paul... Caroline leads those of us of mature and wise ages to the very real hope we have much more to explore."

Paul is a longtime member of The Writers Grotto, whose notable members include Noah Hawley, Bonnie Tsui, Mary Roach, and Kathryn Ma.

== Personal life ==
In 2018, Paul and MacNaughton were married. Paul and MacNaughton separated in 2023 after 15 years together.

Caroline Paul's identical twin is Baywatch actress Alexandra Paul. On the set of Christine where Alexandra had a leading role, Caroline was brought in for a day of film shooting; as a prank Caroline was put in full costume and makeup which fooled director John Carpenter into thinking that he was directing Alexandra. Due to Alexandra's fame on Baywatch, Caroline Paul was often mistaken for her twin sister even when in full firefighter gear. This prompted her to write the short book Almost Her, which examines the peculiarities of fame and the science of twins. The two sisters were featured in a People magazine feature on twins, "Seeing Double," in 1998.

Her brother Jonathan Paul was a leader in the underground animal rights group Animal Liberation Front, which freed beagles from medical labs, minks from fur farms, and burned down a horse slaughterhouse. For his actions, he went to prison for four years.

Paul is a pilot who flies gyrocopters in her spare time.

Her cousin Jean Paul is a professional cricket player.

== Works ==
- Fighting Fire, ISBN 978-0-312-97000-0
- East Wind, Rain, ISBN 978-0-06-078076-0
- Lost Cat, ISBN 978-1-60-819977-8
- The Gutsy Girl, ISBN 978-1632861238
- A Little Tea Book, ISBN 978-1-63286-902-9
- You Are Mighty, ISBN 978-1-68119-822-4
- Tough Broad, ISBN 978-1-63557-649-8
