= Chai poh =

Chinese fermented radish

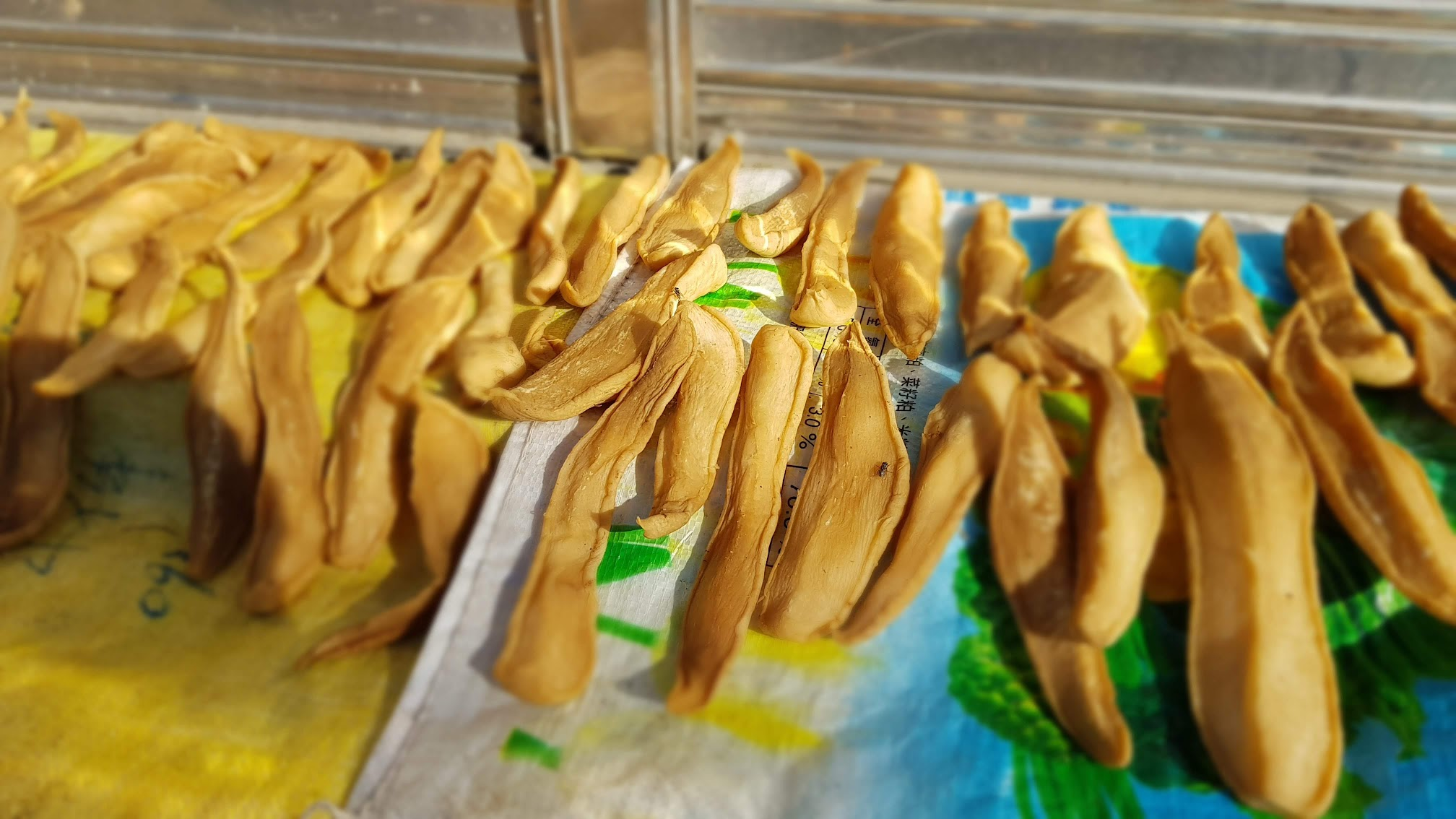
Chai poh

Chai poh (菜餔), also spelled chye poh or cai poh in Singapore, is a fundamental ingredient in Teochew cuisine, Fujian cuisine and Taiwanese cuisine. It refers to salted, sun-dried, and fermented daikon radish that delivers a highly savory, slightly sweet, and intensely umami flavor.

In Hong Kong, older generations refer to chai poh as "radish liver" (蘿蔔膶). In Cantonese, "膶" originally refers to pig liver. Chai poh is called "radish liver" because its shape and colour resemble pig liver.

== Types of chai poh ==
Traditional Teochew cuisine strictly differentiates between salty chai poh (咸菜脯) and sweet chai poh (甜菜脯, aka sweetened salty chai poh), using them for completely different flavor profiles for everyday cookings. There is also lao chai poh (老菜脯, lit. aged preserved radish), which is matured for years and develops a deeper, more complex flavor, but it is considered an aged variant rather than a third flavor category. Lao chai poh is rarely used in everyday Fujian and Taiwanese dishes.

=== Salty chai poh ===
Salty chai poh is the most traditional and widely used form of preserved radish in Teochew cooking. It is simply salted and sun‑dried, resulting in a pale yellow or beige color and a firm, crunchy texture. Its flavor is intensely salty with a bright, fermented aroma, so it is often rinsed before cooking to adjust the salt level. This version is prized for its crisp bite and savory depth, making it ideal for stir‑fries, porridge accompaniments, and the classic Teochew preserved‑radish omelette.

=== Sweet chai poh ===
Sweet chai poh is made from salted radish that is later cooked with sugar, giving it a gentle caramel aroma and a mellow sweet‑salty balance. Its color is usually a deeper brown because the sugar darkens during cooking, and the texture becomes softer and slightly chewy. This version is popular in dishes where a touch of sweetness enhances the overall flavor, such as omelettes, congee toppings, and stir‑fries that benefit from a warm, rounded taste rather than sharp saltiness.

=== Lao chai poh ===
Lao chai poh refers to aged preserved radish, a specialty that undergoes repeated cycles of salting, pressing, and sun‑drying over several years. Through long aging, the radish darkens to a deep brown or nearly black color, becoming soft, pliable, and rich with concentrated umami. Its flavor is far more complex than ordinary chai poh—earthy, slightly smoky, and reminiscent of aged tangerine peel or fermented vegetables used in traditional Chinese herbal cooking. Because of its depth and medicinal character, lao chai poh is typically used in slow‑simmered soups and nourishing broths rather than quick stir‑fries.

== Making chai poh ==
=== Salty chai poh ===
The essential technique behind making Teochew salty chai poh lies in repeated cycles of sun‑drying, salting, pressing, and slow fermentation. Traditional home methods require about a week of uninterrupted sunny weather. The ingredients are simply white radishes and coarse salt (roughly 3–5% of the radish's weight). The basic tools include drying racks or bamboo trays, a breathable basket or container, and an airtight jar for storage. Begin by washing the radishes, cutting them lengthwise into halves, and leaving the skin on. Lay them out under full sun for an entire day until the radishes soften and become flexible. In the evening, rub coarse salt evenly over the surface, then layer them in a basket: a layer of salt, a layer of radish, then salt again, repeating until full. Cover the basket and weigh it down with a heavy stone. As the radishes release moisture, liquid will drip from the bottom, so place a basin underneath to collect it. Leave the radishes under pressure overnight. The next morning, discard the extracted liquid and sun‑dry the radishes for another full day. At night, repeat the salting and pressing. For the following days, simply continue the cycle of sun‑drying by day and pressing by night. When the radishes have shrunk significantly and the surface becomes wrinkled, they are technically ready—usually after about a week—though the flavour will still be mild. For a deeper, richer taste, the process is extended to about a month. Over time, the radishes gradually turn a golden yellow, a hallmark of well‑made Teochew chai poh.

=== Sweet chai poh ===
Sweet chai poh is much less labour‑intensive than salty chai poh and can be completed in about four to five days. The process uses the same basic principles of salting and sun‑drying, but in a much lighter form. Only 2–3% salt (based on radish weight) is used, and the drying stage lasts just one to two days, enough for the radish to soften and become slightly leathery without fully dehydrating. After the brief sun‑drying, the radish is gently cooked with a light sugar syrup—about 5–10% of the radish’s weight in sugar, melted over low heat until it coats the pieces evenly. Once cooled, the sweetened radish is transferred to a clean jar and left to cure in the refrigerator for two to three days, allowing the flavour to settle and the texture to become pleasantly chewy.

=== Lao chai poh ===
Lao chai poh is made through a long, deliberate process of heavy salting, repeated sun‑drying, and extended fermentation that can last for years. Fresh white radishes are first washed, cut lengthwise, and mixed with a generous amount of coarse salt—typically 5–10% of the radish’s weight, far more than what is used for ordinary salty chai poh. The salted radish is left to wilt and release moisture, then pressed under weight overnight to drive out even more liquid. Over the following weeks, the radish undergoes a cycle of sun‑drying by day and pressing by night, gradually shrinking, darkening, and becoming leathery as water evaporates and the salt penetrates deeply. Once the radish has lost most of its moisture and developed a firm, concentrated texture, it is packed tightly into a clay jar, sometimes with a thin layer of salt between layers, and sealed for long‑term aging. During this stage—lasting one to several years—the radish slowly ferments and matures: natural enzymes break down fibres, sugars caramelise, and the colour deepens from pale gold to deep brown or even black. The result is lao chai poh: intensely aromatic, sweet‑savory, earthy, and prized for its medicinal warmth and depth of flavour, far more complex than ordinary preserved radish.
