= Nelson Mandela Mural by Shepard Fairey =

Public artwork in Johannesburg

The Purple Shall Govern Mural
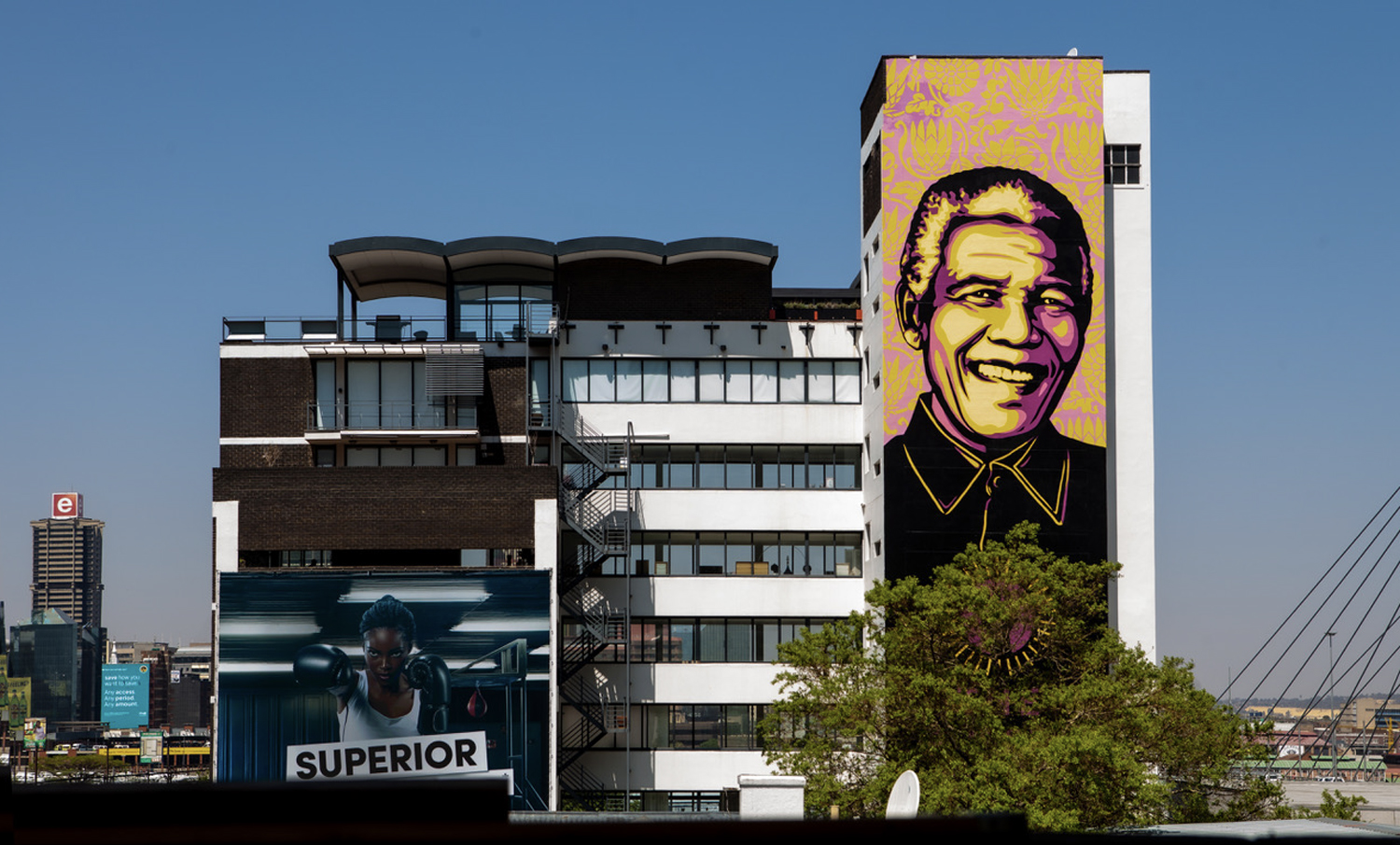
- Artist: Shepard Fairey
- Year: 2014
- Type: Spray paint and acrylic
- Dimensions: 28.8 m × 7 m (94.5 ft × 23 ft)
- Location: Johannesburg, South Africa

The Purple Shall Govern Mural (historically known as the Nelson Mandela Mural) is a 10-storey, 2,174 square feet (202.0 m2) public artwork on Juta Street in Braamfontein, Johannesburg. Created by Shepard Fairey and completed in September 2014, the artwork pays tribute to Nelson Mandela and marks the 25th anniversary of the 1989 Purple Rain Protest. The mural overlooks the Nelson Mandela Bridge and has drawn stylistic comparisons to Fairey's 2008 Barack Obama "HOPE" poster.

Former U.S. President Barack Obama and Graça Machel unveiled a silkscreen edition of the mural at the Mandela 100 USA Celebration Gala on April 27, 2019, held at the Smithsonian National Museum of African American History and Culture in Washington, D.C.

In 2023, the artwork was featured prominently in the opening title sequence of the Netflix documentary series Working: What We Do All Day, hosted by Obama. On February 28, 2025, a silkscreen print of the artwork was auctioned in Cape Town in collaboration with the Black Coffee Foundation, setting a regional auction record for a Shepard Fairey print at R350,000.

The public mural project and its subsequent limited silkscreen edition were curated and produced by Jesse Stagg. The mural was executed over four days by Shepard Fairey and his Obey Giant production crew, including Dan Flores and Rob Zagula, with institutional support from the Nelson Mandela Foundation, the U.S. State Department, Play Braamfontein, and the South African Consulate of Los Angeles.
