= Kosher salt =

Coarse additive-free edible salt

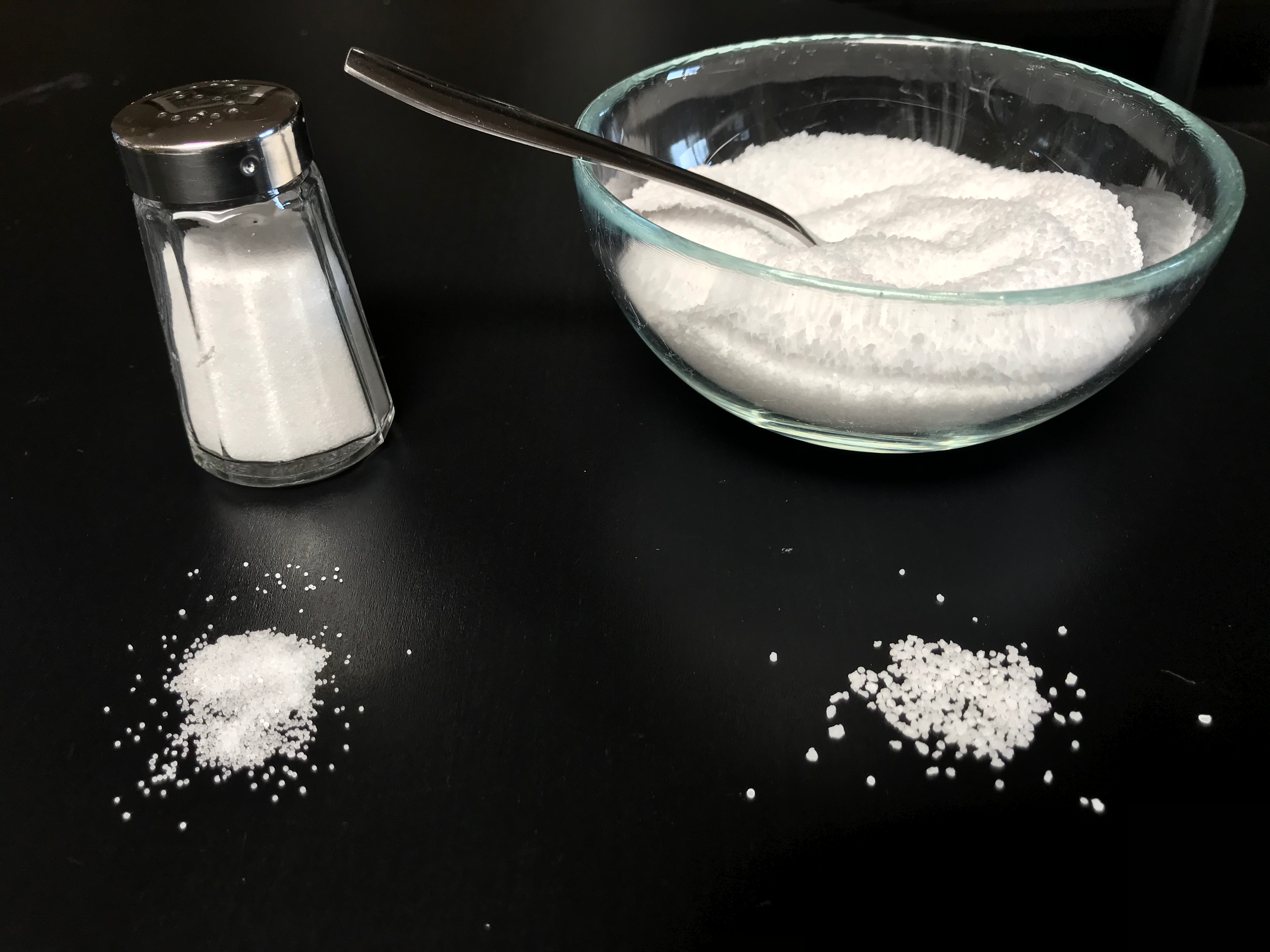
Comparison of table salt (left) with kosher salt (right)

Kosher salt or kitchen salt (also called cooking salt, rock salt, kashering salt, or koshering salt) is coarse edible salt usually without common additives such as iodine, typically used in cooking and not at the table. It consists mainly of sodium chloride and may include anticaking agents.

== Etymology ==
Coarse edible salt is a kitchen staple, but its name varies widely in various cultures and countries. The term kosher salt gained common usage in the United States and refers to its use in the Jewish religious practice of dry brining meats, known as kashering, e.g. a salt for kashering, and not to the salt itself being manufactured under kosher guidelines. Some brands further identify kosher-certified salt as being approved by a religious body.

== Culinary history ==
In cooking recipes published in the United States since about 2010, kosher salt has largely replaced the more fine-grained table salt as the kind of salt called for. This may be a public health concern, because kosher salt does not contain iodine, which is added to table salt to prevent iodine deficiency.

The popularity of kosher salt in cooking began in the US during the 1980s with professional chefs, who preferred kosher salt because its coarser grains are easier to pick up and distribute with the fingers than table salt. In the 1990s, the Food Network television channel popularized kosher salt for home cooking. On television, kosher salt had the additional advantage that its grains were more easily visible and looked more attractive. Moreover, influential cookbooks such as The Food Lab by J. Kenji López-Alt and Salt, Fat, Acid, Heat by Samin Nosrat "devote[d] paragraphs to the benefits of kosher over table salt", making it "the lingua franca of restaurant kitchens" and a shibboleth for home cooks who wanted to demonstrate their seriousness about cooking.

Another trend that made kosher salt more popular among nonprofessional cooks was recipes being increasingly published on the Internet, such as in blogs, where readers could interact with the authors through comments and often demanded more specific instructions than "salt to taste". This meant that authors who specified volume measurements of salt, such as teaspoons, had to specify the kind of salt to be used. They often chose kosher salt as the type of salt with which they themselves were most familiar.

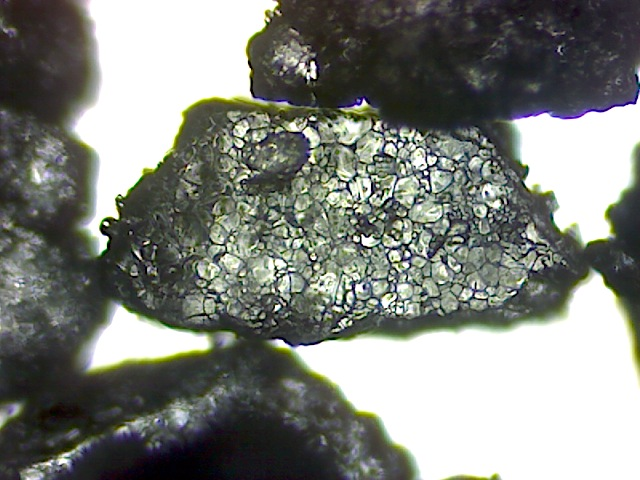
Grain of kosher salt taken at 60× magnification

== Use ==
=== General cooking ===
Due to the lack of metallic or off-tasting additives such as iodine, fluoride or dextrose, it is often used in the kitchen instead of additive-containing common table salt. Estimating the amount of salt when salting by hand can also be easier due to the larger grain size. Some recipes specifically call for volume measurement of kosher/kitchen salt, which for some brands weighs less per measure due to its lower density and is therefore less salty than an equal volume measurement of table salt; recipes which call for a specified weight of salt are more consistent. Different brands of salt vary dramatically in density; for one brand the same volume measure may contain twice as much salt (by mass) as for another brand.

=== Brining or kashering meat ===
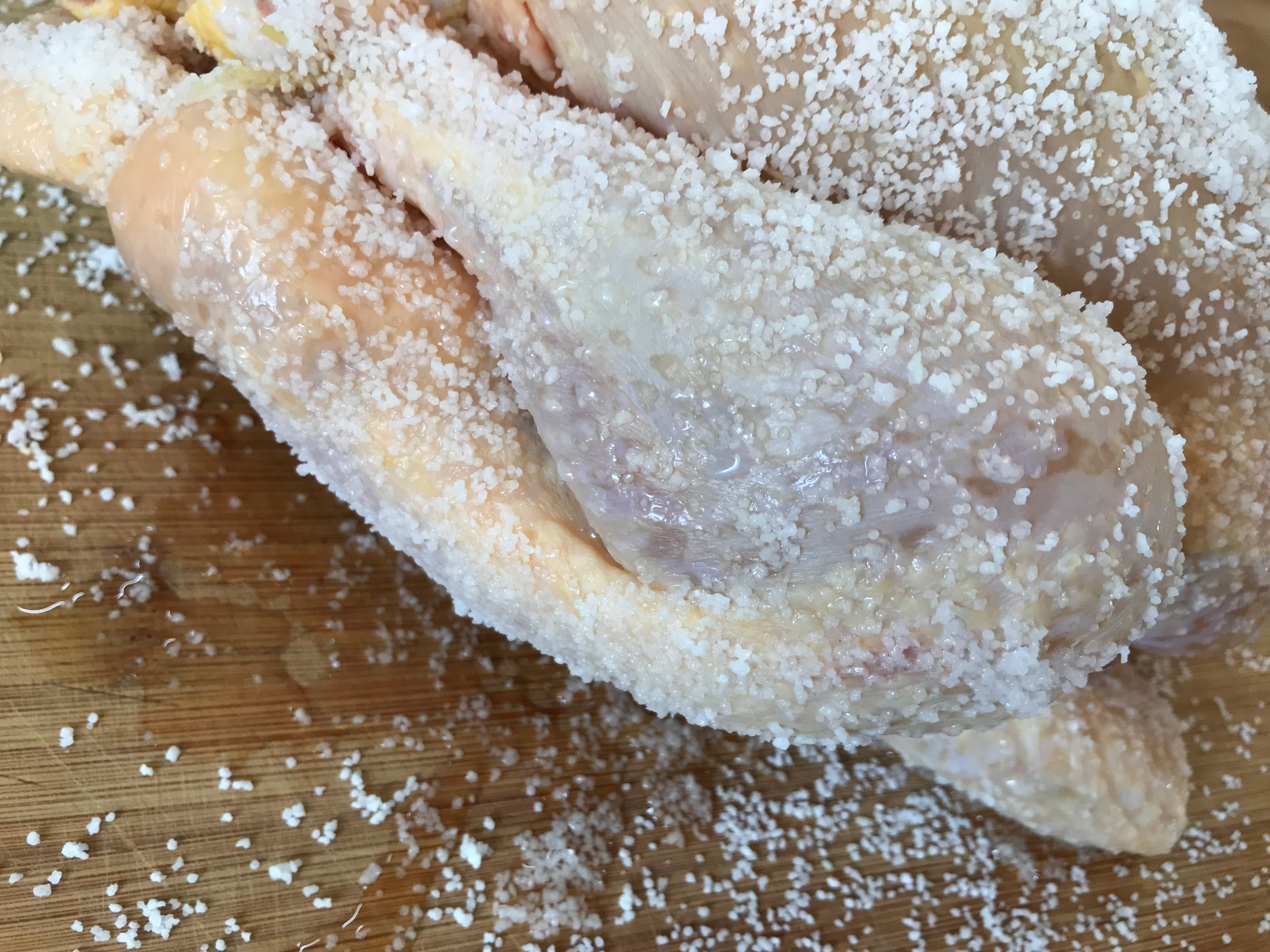
Kosher salt applied to chicken showing extracted moisture after one hour

The coarse-grained salt is used to create a dry brine, which increases succulence and flavor and satisfies some religious requirements, sometimes with flavor additions such as herbs, spices or sugar. The meat is typically soaked in cool water and drained and then completely covered with a thin layer of salt—and then allowed to stand on a rack or board for an hour or more. The larger salt granules remain on the surface of the meat, for the most part undissolved, and absorb fluids from the meat, which are then partially reabsorbed with the salt and any added flavors, essentially brining the meat in its own juices. The salt rub is then rinsed off and discarded before cooking.

=== Cleaning ===
Due to its grain size, the salt is also used as an abrasive cleaner for cookware such as cast iron skillets. Mixed with oil, it retains its abrasiveness but can be easily dissolved with water after cleaning, unlike cleansers based on pumice or calcium carbonate, which can leave a gritty residue if not thoroughly rinsed away.

== Manufacturing ==
Rather than cubic crystals, kosher salt has a flat plate-like shape and for some brands may also have a hollow pyramidal shape. Morton Salt produces flat kosher salt while Diamond Crystal produces pyramidal. The flat form is usually made when cubic crystals are forced into this shape under pressure, usually between rollers. The pyramidal salt crystals are generally made by an evaporative process called the Alberger process. Kosher salt is usually manufactured with a grain size larger than table salt grains. Diamond Crystal salt is made by Cargill in St. Clair, Michigan, and Morton Salt is from Chicago, Illinois.

== See also ==
- Pickling salt – Fine-grained salt used for manufacturing pickles
- Korean brining salt – Coarse salt
- Pickling – Procedure of preserving food in brine or vinegar
- Curing (food preservation) – Food preservation and flavouring processes
- Kosher foods – Foods conforming to Jewish dietary law
- Shechita – Ritual slaughter of an animal in Jewish law
