= San Francisco Writers Grotto =

Coworking space in San Francisco, California

The San Francisco Writers Grotto (sometimes referred to as "The Grotto") is a writers' coworking space in San Francisco’s SOMA district. Founded in 1993 by writers Po Bronson, Ethan Canin and Ethan Watters, the Writers Grotto is a community of working writers which provides support, feedback, and community to its members. Members have won Pulitzer prizes and Guggenheim Fellowships and penned New York Times bestsellers, national TV series and movies. All Writers Grotto members are vetted before acceptance and must have a published book or a significant amount of journalistic or related media work published.

== Notable Members ==
- Brad Balukjian
- Natalie Baszile
- Ethan Canin
- Noah Hawley
- Vanessa Hua
- Rachel Levin
- Roberto Lovato
- Joshua Mohr
- ZZ Packer
- Caroline Paul
- Mary Roach
- Jason Roberts
- Julia Scott
- Julia Scheeres
- T.J. Stiles
- Zara Stone
- Bonnie Tsui
- Vendela Vida
