= Zara Stone =

American writer

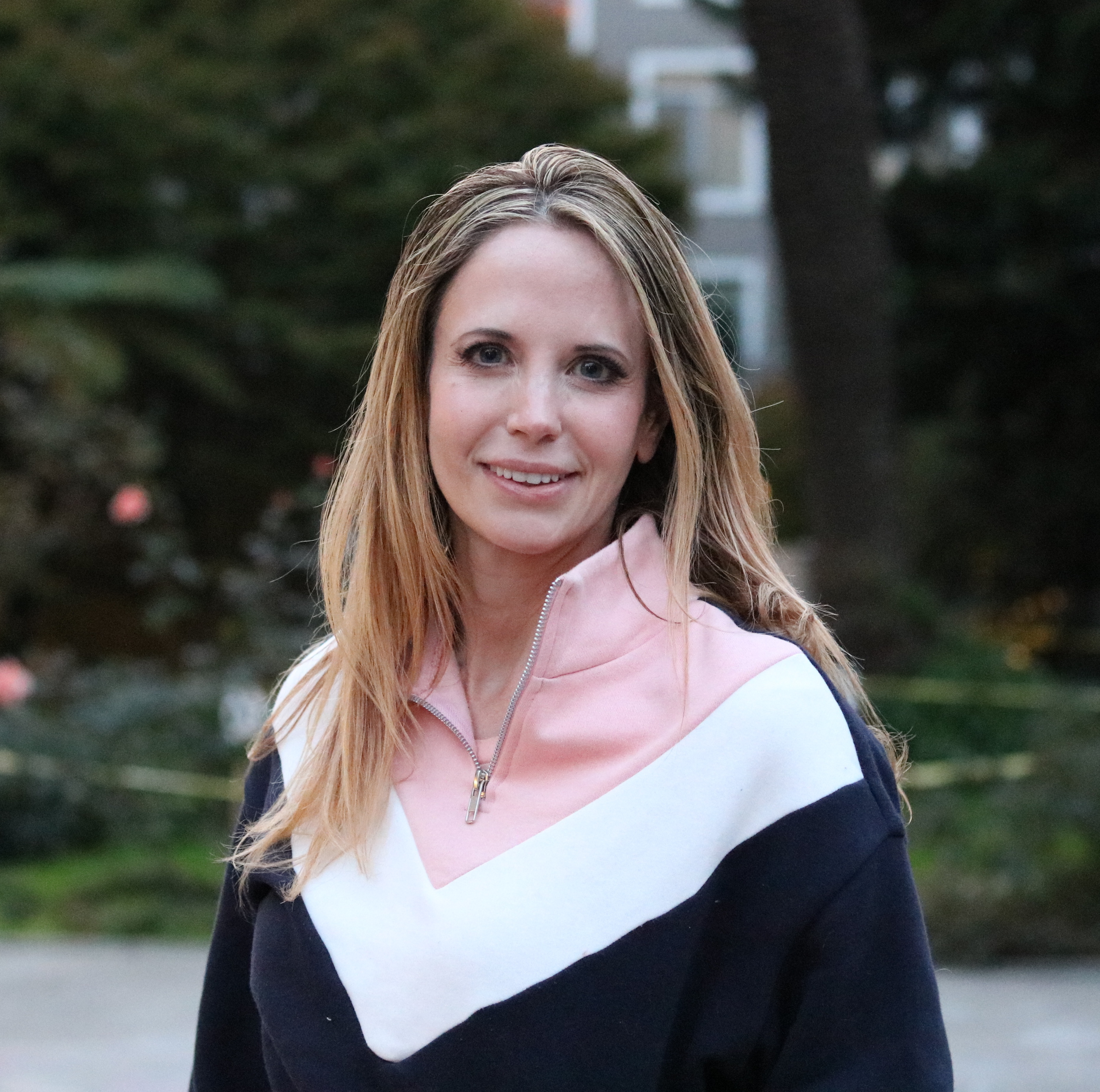
Headshot of Zara Stone, Journalist and Author

Zara Stone (born April 30, 1989) is a San Francisco-based author and journalist. In 2020, her first book, The Future of Science Is Female: The Brilliant Minds Shaping the 21st Century, was published by Mango Publishing. Local News Matters says it "will STEM the tide of male domination in science." KALW described it as "about projects that women in STEM are working on." It was listed in Women's History Month New Nonfiction for Teens March 2021 by the Seattle Public Library.

Stone lives in San Francisco and has contributed stories, essays and cultural commentary to The Atlantic, The Wall Street Journal, Wired Magazine, Cosmopolitan, The Washington Post, CNN, and more. Her reporting encompasses technology, business, and lifestyle, and the intersection of lookism and criminal justice. Stone is quoted by The San Francisco Chronicle, and her journalism is cited in numerous books. She is a board member of the San Francisco Writers Grotto.

Her second book, a narrative nonfiction account of prison reform, through the lens of beauty, racism, economics, and history, Killer Looks: The Forgotten History of Plastic Surgery in Prison, was published in 2021 by Prometheus Books.

New York Times bestselling author Mary Roach, described Killer Looks: The Forgotten History of Plastic Surgery in Prison, as, "a fascinating, often shocking look inside the American prison system. Expertly and rigorously researched, Killer Looks takes the reader through the little-known practice of testing surgeries on prisoners, the rise and fall of the rehabilitation movement, the surprising economics of lookism, and the ingrained racism at the heart of all of it. Stone writes with compassion and authority. I won't soon forget this book."

The work was praised as extraordinarily detailed and vividly compelling, by ABC News, Late Night Live Australia, and called "bonkers," by Kate Lister, a historian, author of "Whores of Yore", and a podcast producer on History Hit. Since publication, Stone has guest lectured at Stanford University.
