= Brining =

Food processing by treating with brine or salt

Brining is treating food with brine or coarse salt which preserves and seasons the food while enhancing tenderness. Flavor can be further developed with additions such as herbs, spices, sugar, caramel or vinegar. Meat and fish are typically brined for less than twenty-four hours while vegetables, cheeses and fruit are brined in a much longer process known as pickling. Brining is similar to marination, except that a marinade usually includes a significant amount of acid, such as vinegar or citrus juice. Brining is also similar to curing, which usually involves significantly drying the food, and is done over a much longer time period.

== Meat ==
Brining is a food processing technique in which meat is soaked in a salt water solution – a brine – similar to marination before cooking. The brine may be seasoned with spices and herbs. Duration varies from 30 minutes to several days depending on the cut's size, thickness, and desired effect.

=== Dry brining ===
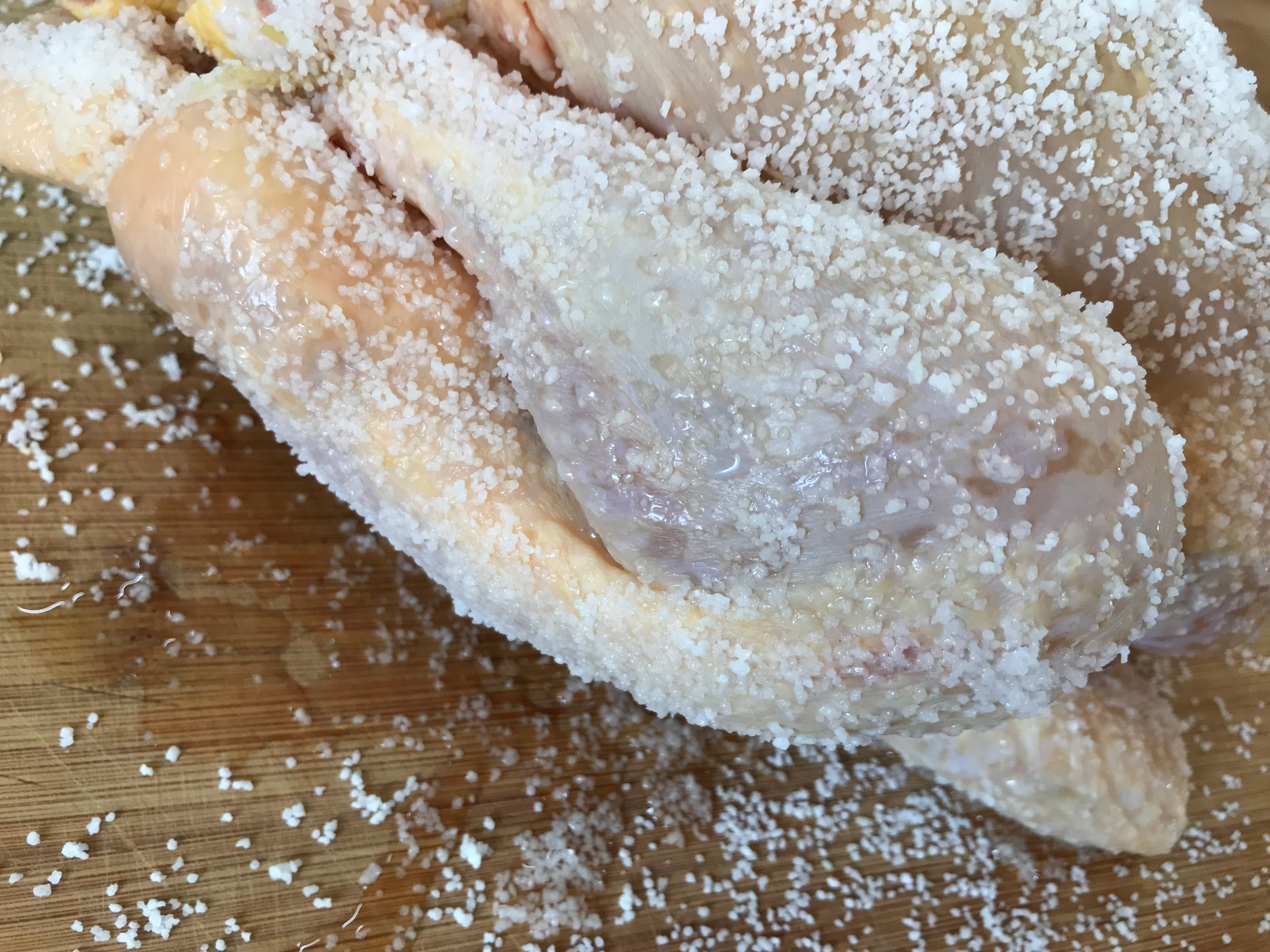
Kitchen salt applied to chicken showing extracted moisture after one hour.

Brining can also be achieved by covering the meat in dry coarse salt and left to rest for several hours. The salt draws moisture from the interior of the meat to the surface, where it mixes with the salt and is then reabsorbed with the salt essentially brining the meat in its own juices. The salt rub is then rinsed off and discarded before cooking.

Food scientists have two theories about the brining effect, but which one is correct is still under debate.

- The brine surrounding the cells has a higher concentration of salt than the fluid within the cells, but the cell fluid has a higher concentration of other solutes. This leads salt ions to diffuse into the cell, while the solutes in the cells cannot diffuse through the cell membranes into the brine. The increased salinity of the cell fluid causes the cell to absorb water from the brine via osmosis.
- The salt introduced into the cell denatures its proteins. The proteins coagulate, forming a matrix that traps water molecules and holds them during cooking. This prevents the meat from dehydrating.

== Fish ==
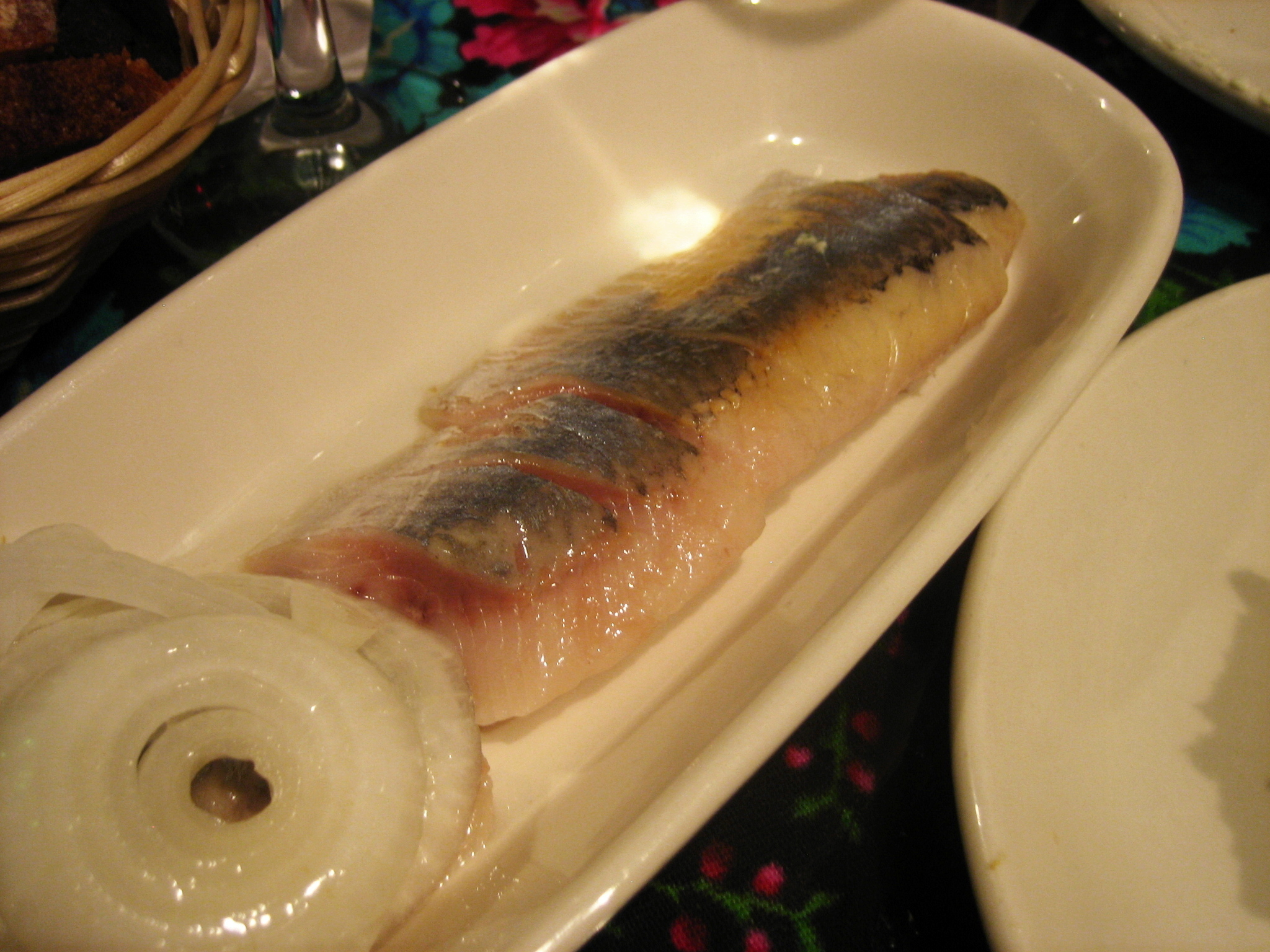
Brined herring

As opposed to dry salting, fish brining or wet-salting is performed by immersion of fish into brine, or just sprinkling it with salt without draining the moisture. To ensure long-term preservation, the solution has to contain at least 20% of salt, a process called "heavy salting" in fisheries; heavy-salted fish must be desalted in cold water or milk before consumption. If less salt is used, the fish is suited for immediate consumption, but additional refrigeration is necessary for longer preservation.

Wet-salting is used for preparation of:

- Salted herring, non-gutted, with hard or soft roe and heavily salted (20% NaCl brine, with final product containing around 12% salt),
- Soused herring which is gutted and lightly salted (2–3% NaCl), without roe,
- Anchovies, which can be immersed in brine or wet-salted. After several years, the fish liquefies and can be processed into paste or anchovy butter,
- Caviar and other types of roe.

== Vegetables ==
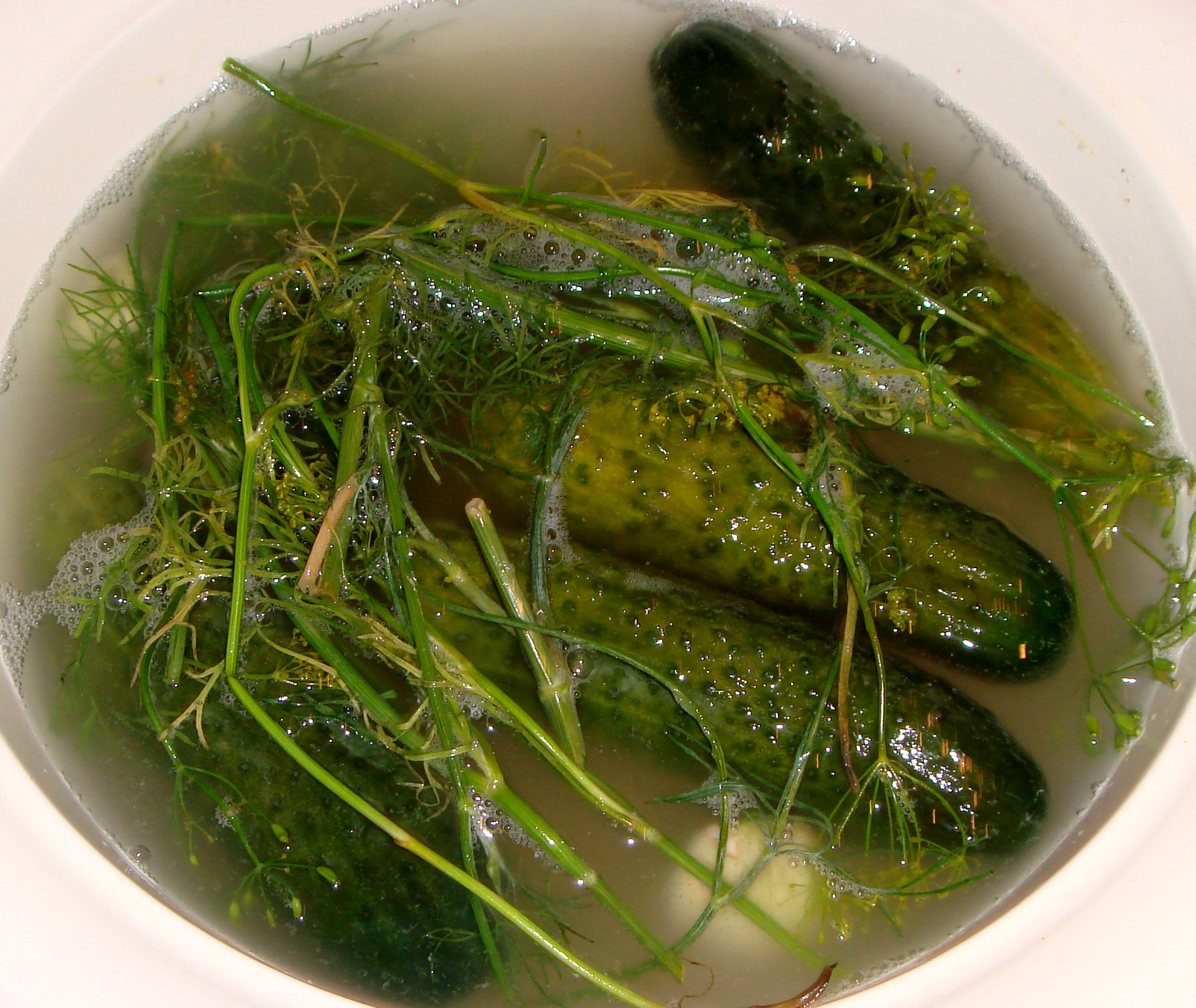
Pickled cucumbers in brine (with dill)

Vegetables are immersed in brine, vinegar or vinaigrette for extended periods of time in the process of pickling, where they undergo anaerobic fermentation which affects their texture and flavor. Pickling can preserve perishable foods for months. Antimicrobial herbs and spices, such as mustard seed, garlic, cinnamon or cloves, are often added. Unlike the canning process, pickling (which includes fermentation) does not require that the food be completely sterile before it is sealed. The acidity or salinity of the solution, the temperature of fermentation, and the exclusion of oxygen determine which microorganisms dominate, and determine the flavor of the end product.

== Cheese ==
Brine is used in two ways in cheese production:

- Brined cheeses, such as halloumi and feta, are pickled in brine.
- Washed-rind cheeses, such as Munster, are washed with brine during the production process.

== See also ==
- Kosher salt – Coarse additive-free edible salt
- Pickling salt – Fine-grained salt used for manufacturing pickles
- Curing (food preservation) – Food preservation and flavouring processes based on drawing moisture out of the food by osmosis
