= Sorry/Not Sorry (film) =

- Directed by: Caroline Suh; Cara Mones
- Produced by: Caroline Suh; Cara Mones; Kathleen Lingo
- Cinematography: Bob Richman
- Edited by: Peter Holmes
- Music by: Kyle Scott Wilson
- Production companies: The New York Times; Left/Right
- Distributed by: Greenwich Entertainment
- Release date: September 10, 2023 (TIFF)
- Running time: 90 minutes
- Country: United States
- Language: English

Sorry/Not Sorry is a 2023 American documentary film directed and produced by Caroline Suh and Cara Mones. It follows the aftermath of The New York Times's 2017 reporting of Louis C.K.'s sexual misconduct, C.K.'s admission that the reporting was true, and the effects his comeback had on the five women who came forward to relate those accounts.

It had its world premiere at the 2023 Toronto International Film Festival on September 10, 2023.

== Background ==
On November 9, 2017, The New York Times published a report by Melena Ryzik, Cara Buckley, and Jodi Kantor, in which comedian Louis C.K. was accused by five women—four of whom were fellow comedians—of sexual misconduct. In one incident at the 2002 U.S. Comedy Arts Festival in Aspen, Colorado, two comedians, Dana Min Goodman and Julia Wolov, related that when C.K. invited them to hang out in his hotel room for a nightcap after their late-night show, he asked them if he could masturbate in front of them. Though the women thought he was joking, C.K. took off all of his clothes and began to pleasure himself in front of them. Goodman said, "We were paralyzed." In another instance, comedian Abby Schachner said that during a 2003 phone call with C.K., she could hear him masturbating as they spoke. Another comedian, Rebecca Corry, said that while she was appearing with C.K. in a 2005 television pilot, he asked if he could masturbate in front of her. Stunned, she angrily declined, pointing out that he had a daughter and a pregnant wife, upon which an embarrassed C.K. said he "had issues". A fifth, anonymous woman, described an incident in the late 1990s, when she was in her early 20s, working in production on The Chris Rock Show. C.K., a writer and producer on that series, repeatedly asked her as she sat in his office to watch him masturbate, and though she consented to this, she later questioned his behavior, saying, "It was something that I knew was wrong. I think the big piece of why I said yes was because of the culture. He abused his power." A co-worker on the show confirmed that the woman told her about the incident soon after it happened. Goodman and Wolov immediately reported the hotel incident to others, but found that their colleagues were not sympathetic, with Wolov saying, "Guys were backing away from us...We could already feel the backlash." The women learned from their managers that C.K.'s manager, Dave Becky, wanted them to stop telling others about these incidents.

The day after the Times published its report, C.K. issued a public statement in which he admitted, "These stories are true." He wrote:

These stories are true. At the time, I said to myself that what I did was O.K. because I never showed a woman my dick without asking first, which is also true. But what I learned later in life, too late, is that when you have power over another person, asking them to look at your dick isn't a question. It's a predicament for them. The power I had over these women is that they admired me. And I wielded that power irresponsibly. I have been remorseful of my actions. And I've tried to learn from them. And run from them. Now I'm aware of the extent of the impact of my actions. I learned yesterday the extent to which I left these women who admired me feeling badly about themselves and cautious around other men who would never have put them in that position. I also took advantage of the fact that I was widely admired in my and their community, which disabled them from sharing their story and brought hardship to them when they tried because people who look up to me didn't want to hear it. I didn't think that I was doing any of that because my position allowed me not to think about it. There is nothing about this that I forgive myself for. And I have to reconcile it with who I am...The hardest regret to live with is what you've done to hurt someone else...I have spent my long and lucky career talking and saying anything I want. I will now step back and take a long time to listen.

After the Times report was published, Becky said, "I don't recall the exact specifics of the conversation, but know I never threatened anyone."

== Plot ==
The film follows the sexual misconduct allegations against Louis C.K., examines how C.K. was able to get away with his behavior for as long as he did, and examines how he was able to return to comedy despite the allegations and the effects his return has had on those who made them. Among those interviewed in the film are comedians Andy Kindler and Michael Ian Black.

== Production ==
In August 2022, it was announced that Showtime was in production on a documentary about the sexual misconduct allegations against Louis C.K. and his return to comedy, with Caroline Suh directing and The New York Times producing. In June 2023, Showtime dropped the project.

== Release ==
The film had its world premiere at the 2023 Toronto International Film Festival on September 10, 2023. Shortly thereafter, Greenwich Entertainment acquired distribution rights to the film.
