= Whitey: United States of America v. James J. Bulger =

2014 documentary film directed by Joe Berlinger

- Sundance Film Festival poster
- Directed by: Joe Berlinger
- Produced by: Joe Berlinger; Caroline Suh
- Cinematography: Robert Richman; Étienne Sauret
- Edited by: Alex Horwitz; Joshua L. Pearson
- Music by: Wendy Blackstone
- Production companies: CNN Films; Radical Media
- Release date: January 18, 2014 (Sundance Film Festival)
- Running time: 129 minutes
- Country: United States
- Language: English
- Box office: $75,644

Whitey: United States of America v. James J. Bulger is a 2014 American biographical documentary film produced and directed by Joe Berlinger. It is produced by CNN Films and Radical Media. Its world premiere was at the 2014 Sundance Film Festival on January 18, 2014.

== Synopsis ==
The film narrates the trials of gangster James "Whitey" Bulger, using the legal proceedings as a springboard to explore allegations of corruption within the highest levels of law enforcement.

== Critical reception ==
After its premiere at the Sundance Film Festival, the film received mostly positive reviews from critics. On review aggregator website Rotten Tomatoes, the film has an approval rating of 80% based on 50 reviews, with an average rating of 7/10. The site's critics' consensus reads: "An admirable yet incomplete effort to cover a sprawling subject, Whitey: United States of America v. James J. Bulger will leave viewers wanting more -- in good ways as well as bad."

Steve Greene of Indiewire gave the film a grade of A− and said that "As a primer on both the case and Bulger's career as a mob leader, "Whitey" offers a comprehensive look at a saga that – despite the conclusion of the 2013 trial – still feels unresolved." Drew Talor in his review for The Playlist praised it by comparing it with Berlinger's 1996 documentary film Paradise Lost: The Child Murders at Robin Hood Hills that "It might not be the same emotional sucker punch that "Paradise Lost" was, but in a strange way 'Whitey' might be more tragic." Raffi Asdourian of The Film Stage in his review said that "The film weaves together an ornate tapestry of corruption that is a comprehensive exploration of a very complicated case. Insightful and revelatory, this documentary will surely fascinate anyone with any interest about the case or learning about the man who inspired Jack Nicholson's character in The Departed."

However, John DeFore of The Hollywood Reporter gave a negative review, saying, "Sprawling and sometimes a grind at over two hours, the doc is both cinematically uninspired and journalistically jumbled, muddying its potent main arguments."

Kevin Cullen, Boston Globe columnist and co-author of Whitey Bulger: America's Most Wanted Gangster and the Manhunt That Brought Him to Justice, criticized the film as being too credulous of Bulger's claims that he was never an FBI Informant. In a June, 2014 Boston Globe article, Cullen wrote: "Berlinger does a public service by showing, in detail, that after all these years, after the millions spent on Whitey's trial, we still don't know the extent of corruption by the FBI and the Justice Department when it came to enabling Whitey, or whether FBI agents and supervisors got away with murder. But Berlinger's documentary, in an attempt to put its own stamp on a story so often told, lends undeserved legitimacy to Whitey's unsubstantiated claim that he wasn't an informant. The film ignores much of the overwhelming evidence in the public record, and the resulting impression is so guileless and sympathetic to Whitey as to be disingenuous."
