= Brigette Barrager =

American illustrator and children's writer

Brigette Barranger
- Education: California Institute of the Arts (BFA)
- Occupations: Author; illustrator
- Writing career
- Genre: Children's literature
- Website: brigetteb.blogspot.com

Brigette Barrager is an American illustrator and author of children's books.

She illustrated a biography of Fred Rogers, Fred's Big Feelings (Atheneum, 2020). It received a starred review from Kirkus Reviews.

== Selected works ==
- Twelve Dancing Princesses. Chronicle, 2011.
- Vlad the Rad. Random House, 2019.
- Harmony & Echo: The Mermaid Ballet. Random House Studio, 2023.

=== Authored by others ===
- Uni the Unicorn by Amy Krouse Rosenthal. Random, 2014.
- Louise Trapeze Is Totally 100% Fearless by Micol Ostow. Random, 2015.
- Uni the Unicorn and the Dream Come True by Amy Krouse Rosenthal. Random House, 2017.
- Pocket Full of Colors: The Magical World of Mary Blair, Disney Artist Extraordinaire by Amy Guglielmo and Jacqueline Tourville. Atheneum, 2017.
- Fred’s Big Feelings: The Life and Legacy of Mister Rogers by Laura Renauld. Atheneum, 2019.
- How to Be a Pirate by Isaac Fitzgerald. Bloomsbury, 2019.
- The Nice Dream Truck by Beth Ferry. HarperCollins, 2021.
