= Vanessa Hua =

American journalist and writer

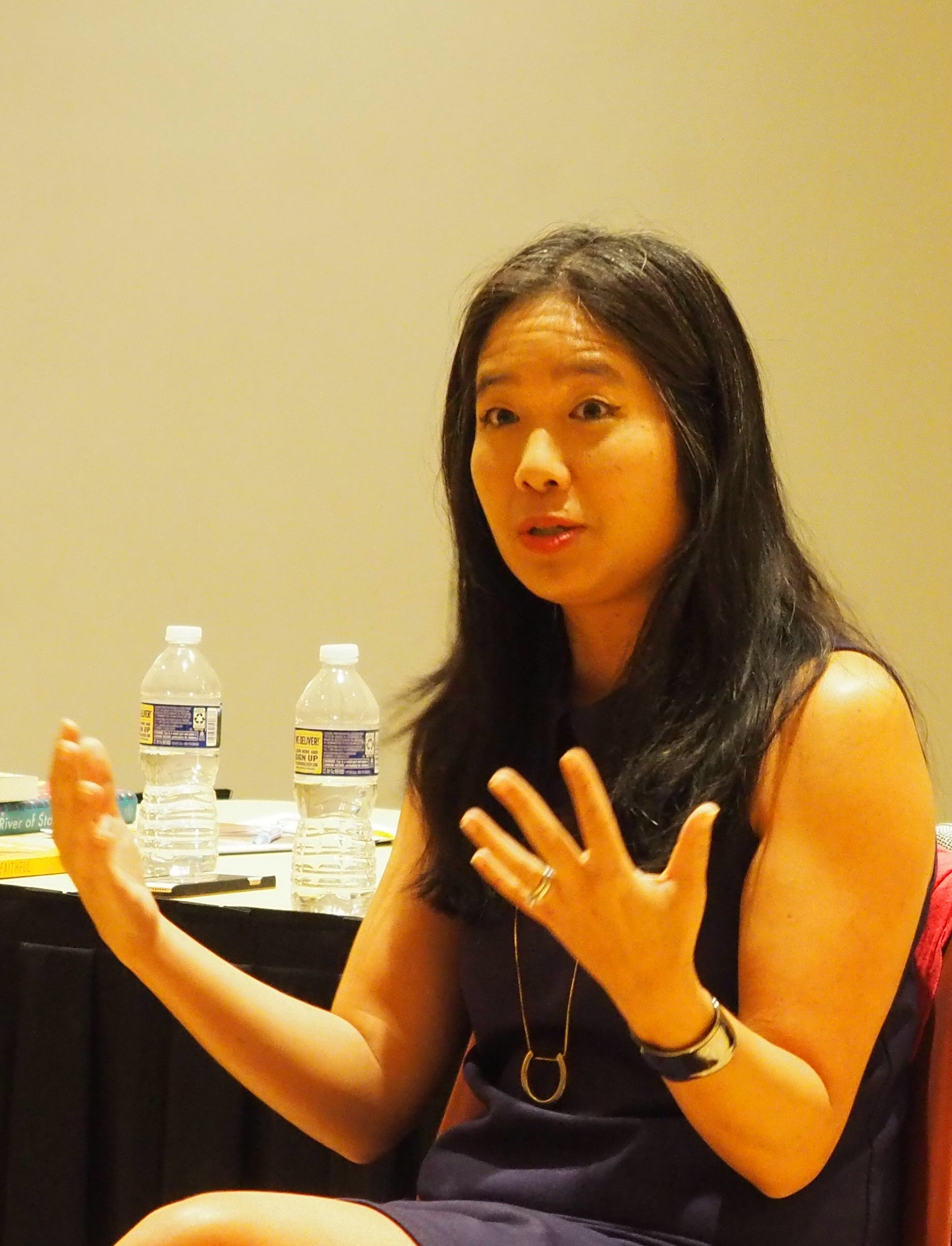
- Hua in 2018
- Citizenship: American
- Education: Stanford University (BA, MA), University of California, Riverside (MFA)
- Writing career
- Notable awards: Rona Jaffe Foundation Writers' Award
- Website: www.vanessahua.com

Vanessa Hua is an American writer and journalist.

== Early life and education ==
Hua was born to a Taiwanese American family. She graduated from Stanford University with a bachelor's degree in English and a master's degree in media studies. She then earned a Master of Fine Arts (M.F.A.) in creative writing from the University of California, Riverside in 2009.

== Career ==
She is the author of Deceit and Other Possibilities (2020) and A River of Stars (2018) and the novel, Forbidden City (2022). She is a member of the San Francisco Writers' Grotto.

Hua has worked as a journalist at the Los Angeles Times, Hartford Courant, San Francisco Examiner, and the San Francisco Chronicle. Hua was a weekly columnist for the San Francisco Chronicle from 2016 to 2023.

Hua has taught at Warren Wilson College's master of fine arts (MFA) program.

She received a National Endowment for the Arts Literature Fellowship award in 2020.

== Personal life ==
Hua is married and has two sons.

== Awards and critical acclaim ==
- 2020 National Endowment for the Arts fellowship
- 2017 Dr. Suzanne Ahn Award for Civil Rights and Social Justice Reporting
- 2017 Finalist, California Book Award
- 2016-17 Asian/Pacific American Award for Literature
- 2015 Rona Jaffe Writers' Award
- Steinbeck Fellowship in Creative Writing
- San Francisco Foundation's James D. Phelan Award for fiction

== Bibliography ==
- Deceit and Other Possibilities (Willow Publishing 2016) ISBN 978-0997199628
- A River of Stars (Ballantine Books August 2018) ISBN 978-0399178788, a novel about San Francisco Chinatown
- Forbidden City (Ballantine Books May 2022) ISBN 978-0-399-17881-8, a novel about a young mistress of Mao Zedong
