= American Rambler (book) =

2026 book by American writer Isaac Fitzgerald

- Author: Isaac Fitzgerald
- Audio read by: Isaac Fitzgerald
- Language: English
- Genre: Memoir, travelogue, history
- Publisher: Knopf
- Publication date: May 12, 2026
- Media type: Print (hardcover), audiobook
- Pages: 352
- ISBN: 978-0-593-53779-4 (hardcover)
- Preceded by: Dirtbag, Massachusetts

American Rambler (subtitled Walking the Trail of Johnny Appleseed) is a 2026 book by American writer Isaac Fitzgerald. It blends memoir, travelogue, and historical inquiry, recounting the author's year‑long journey from Massachusetts to Indiana while attempting to follow the route of John Chapman, the folk figure known as Johnny Appleseed. The book was published by Knopf on May 12, 2026.

== Background and publication ==
Fitzgerald grew up in north‑central Massachusetts not far from Chapman's birthplace in Leominster. He was drawn to the Appleseed legend as a child by his father's stories and by a shared restlessness to leave home. After a period of personal turmoil, including financial struggles, the end of a relationship, and concern for his parents, he decided to walk the so‑called Johnny Appleseed Trail as a way to clear his mind and reconnect with his childhood wanderlust.

Fitzgerald begins his journey in March 2023 at the Johnny Appleseed Visitors' Center in Lancaster, Massachusetts, expecting to find a dedicated footpath. He learns instead that the "Johnny Appleseed Trail" is a highway branding for a stretch of Route 2, intended for motorists. Undeterred, he hikes west through Massachusetts, then drives a Jeep Cherokee he names "Rabbit" through Pennsylvania, Ohio, and Indiana, supplementing the road travel with short walking segments and, at one point, floating on a plastic floatie. Along the route he visits places associated with Chapman: his birthplace in Leominster, his longtime home near Mansfield, Ohio, and his grave site in Fort Wayne, Indiana. He also stops at various markers, monuments, festivals, and claimed "Chapman‑planted" trees, many of which are of unverified authenticity. Interspersed with the travel narrative are historical digressions on Chapman's life, including the revelation that the apples Chapman planted were primarily used for hard cider rather than as eating fruit. Fitzgerald also addresses broader American myth‑making, arguing that histories are flawed human constructs that can be used to obscure darker aspects of the national past.

The personal narrative covers Fitzgerald's history of homelessness as a child, his parents' volatile relationship, his struggles with alcohol, his evolving romantic relationship, and the declining health of his mother, who died in February 2024 while he was completing the book.

The book was published by Knopf, a division of the Knopf Doubleday Publishing Group, in hardcover on May 12, 2026. It runs 352 pages.

== Reception ==
Publishers Weekly, in a starred review, called it a "stirring, singular entry in the American road trip genre" and praised Fitzgerald's "elegant prose, restless curiosity, and deep compassion". Booklist also gave a review, describing the book as a nuanced portrait of Chapman and a thoughtful examination of American mythology. BookPage gave a starred review, calling Fitzgerald an "excellent tour guide" who mixes history, anecdote, and his own personal story to engaging effect.

The Boston Globe noted that Fitzgerald's honesty about his shortcomings prevents his folksy wit from seeming like an affectation, and concluded that the book is not a diagnosis of how America went wrong but rather "a suggestion in practice of how to overcome by putting one foot in front of the other". NPR characterized the book as "part‑memoir and part‑history" and noted its humorous but self‑critical tone.
