= Isaac Fitzgerald =

American author

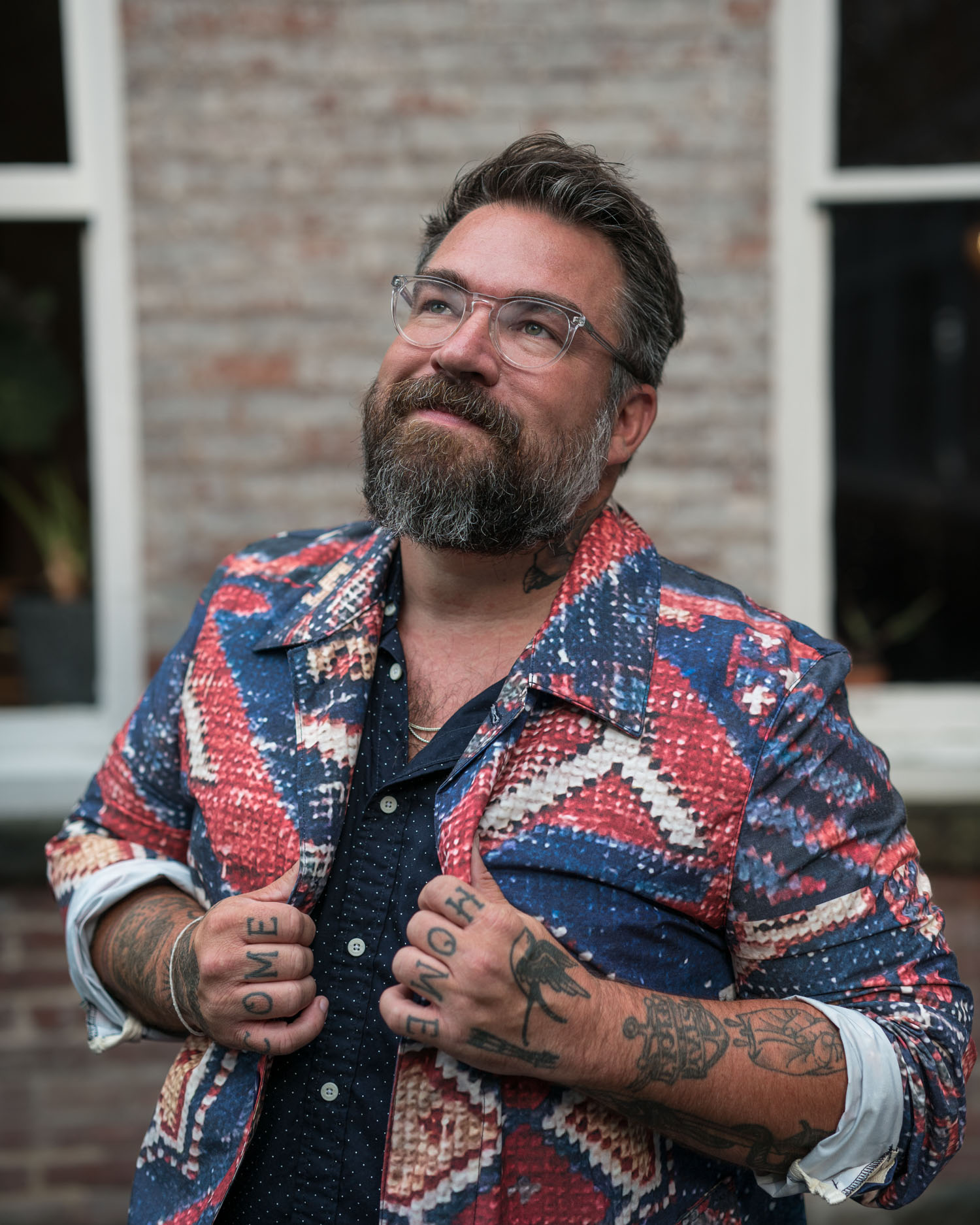
- Fitzgerald in 2023
- Born: 1983 (age 42–43); Boston, Massachusetts, U.S.
- Education: George Washington University
- Occupation: Writer
- Spouse: Kelly Farber
- Writing career
- Genres: Nonfiction; Children's picture books
- Website: www.isaacfitzgerald.net

Isaac Fitzgerald (born 1983) is an American author and editor, best known for his award-winning 2022 memoir Dirtbag, Massachusetts. Fitzgerald is a frequent guest on The Today Show where he shares book recommendations.

== Early life and education ==
Fitzgerald was born in Boston but spent much of his childhood in Athol, Massachusetts. He received his bachelor's degree from George Washington University, where he majored in political science and minored in philosophy.

== Career ==
He joined The Rumpus, a literary magazine, as the first employee in 2009, 10 months after Stephen Elliott founded the publication. There he published essays by writers such as Roxane Gay and Cheryl Strayed. After four years at The Rumpus, he moved to publishing house McSweeney's to be the director of publicity.

In 2013, he became the first book editor at BuzzFeed, where he also hosted a live morning show, "AM to DM," with writer and poet Saeed Jones.

He has written for The New York Times, The Atlantic, The Guardian, The Boston Globe, Esquire, GQ, People, Best American Nonrequired Reading, and elsewhere.

Fitzgerald is also the author of the children's book How to Be a Pirate.

=== Pen & Ink and Knives & Ink ===
Fitzgerald has published two books about tattoos, both of which he co-wrote with the illustrator Wendy MacNaughton. The books describe the stories behind people's tattoos, collected and edited by Fitzgerald, with MacNaughton drawing illustrations of these tattoos.

Michigan Quarterly Review described Pen & Ink: Tattoos and the Stories Behind Them (2014) as "a strikingly illustrated, curated showcase of tattoos," whose backstories "detail heartrending tragedies, funny accidents, and all manner of circumstances in between."

Fitzgerald and MacNaughton published a sequel in 2016, Knives & Ink: Chefs and the Stories Behind Their Tattoos. "The ensuing sixty-five stories run alternately cheeky and earnest, and come from Michelin chefs and scrappy line workers. Collectively, the tales offer a vivid glimpse into cooks’ lives and creative processes, and prove, once and for all, that chefs take their tattoos almost as seriously as their knives."

=== Dirtbag, Massachusetts ===
Fitzgerald's memoir, Dirtbag, Massachusetts, describes his tumultuous upbringing in the small town of Athol, in north central Massachusetts. He writes about his use of drugs and alcohol from an early age, his time at Cushing Academy and later George Washington University, from which he graduated in 2005. The book goes on to explore his early adulthood, including his move to San Francisco, his work as a bartender, pornography actor, and volunteering for a missionary group, Free Burma Rangers, in Thailand and Myanmar. The book appeared on the Publishers Weekly bestseller list in August 2022.

The memoir consists of a collection of essays, not all of which are in chronological order. The Boston Globe reviewed the book positively, describing its stories as "worth hearing and thinking about, even if, like life, it's sometimes messy and out of order."

A review of Dirtbag, Massachusetts in The New York Times described the book as being "about the ways men struggle to make sense of themselves and the romance men too often find in the bottom of a bottle of whiskey," comparing it to works by Jack Kerouac, Charles Bukowski, Richard Price, and Pete Hamill. The San Francisco Chronicle called the book "painfully honest but sincerely funny," and that his stories "resonate as a modern look at what it’s like to feel lost in America."

The book won the 2022 New England Book Award for Nonfiction and the 2023 NAIBA (New Atlantic Independent Booksellers Association) Nonfiction Book of the Year.

=== American Rambler ===
Fitzgerald's fifth book, American Rambler: Walking the Trail of Johnny Appleseed, was released May 12, 2026 by Knopf. The book became a New York Times Bestseller and received starred reviews from both Publishers Weekly and Kirkus Reviews.

"What we learn about the real Appleseed is fascinating... What Fitzgerald learns about himself and the state of the nation is more compelling still, with all their triumphs and tragedies. 'Blue Highways' with hiking boots, and a grand entertainment for travelers real and armchair." —Kirkus Reviews

== Personal life ==
He was previously based in Brooklyn, New York. Fitzgerald and his wife, Kelly Farber, now live with their two dogs on the North Fork of Long Island.

== Publications ==
- —; MacNaughton, Wendy (2014). Pen & Ink: Tattoos and the Stories Behind Them. Bloomsbury Publishing. ISBN 9781620404904.
- —; MacNaughton, Wendy (2016). Knives & Ink: Chefs and the Stories Behind Their Tattoos (and Recipes). Bloomsbury Publishing. ISBN 9781632861214.
- — (2020). How to Be a Pirate. Illustrated by Brigette Barrager. Bloomsbury Children's Books. ISBN 9781681197784.
- — (2022). Dirtbag, Massachusetts. Bloomsbury Publishing. ISBN 9781635573978.
- — (2026). American Rambler: Walking the Trail of Johnny Appleseed. Knopf. ISBN 9780593537794.
