= Working: What We Do All Day =

2022 Netflix documentary series

- Genre: Docuseries
- Directed by: Caroline Suh
- Presented by: Barack Obama
- Country of origin: United States
- Original language: English
- No. of episodes: 4

Production
- Running time: 50–54 min
- Production companies: Concordia Studio; Higher Ground Productions

Original release
- Network: Netflix
- Release: May 17, 2023

Working: What We Do All Day is a four-part Netflix documentary series regarding the work lives of various people in the United States, with each episode focusing on a socio-economic stratum of society. Barack Obama narrates the documentary, which also involves him interviewing some of the people featured in the episodes. The documentary is inspired by Working: People Talk About What They Do All Day and How They Feel About What They Do, the 1974 nonfiction book by Studs Terkel.

In its first six weeks on Netflix, the documentary received 2.3 million views. In the last six months of 2023, it accumulated an additional million views, making it one of the least-watched "higher-profile" Netflix productions of the year, according to The Hollywood Reporter.
