= Samin Nosrat =

American chef and food writer (born 1979)

- Born: November 7, 1979 (age 46); San Diego, California, U.S.
- Education: University of California, Berkeley
- Known for: Salt Fat Acid Heat: Mastering the Elements of Good Cooking (2017)
- Culinary career
- Television show: Salt Fat Acid Heat (2018)
- Award(s) won: James Beard Award 2018 Salt Fat Acid Heat
- Website: ciaosamin.com

Samin Nosrat (Persian: ثمین نصرت, /səˈmin ˈnʌsrɑːt/, born November 7, 1979) is an Iranian-American chef, TV host, food writer and podcaster.

She is the author of the James Beard Award–winning, New York Times Bestselling cookbook Salt Fat Acid Heat and host of a Netflix docu-series of the same name. From 2017 to 2021, she was a food columnist for The New York Times Magazine. Nosrat is also the co-host of the podcast Home Cooking. Her second book is titled Good Things.

== Early life and education ==
Nosrat was born in San Diego, California. She was raised in University City, San Diego and attended La Jolla High School. Her parents emigrated from Iran to the United States in 1976, fleeing state sanctioned persecution of Baháʼís. When Nosrat was 18 months old, her older sister Samar died at the age of three from brain cancer.

She grew up eating mostly Persian cuisine, and though she did not learn to cook until she was an adult, she has said that food was an important part of her childhood.

Nosrat attended the University of California, Berkeley, majoring in English.

== Career ==
=== Early career ===
In 2000, as a sophomore in college, Nosrat ate dinner at Chez Panisse and immediately applied to work there as a busser. She eventually worked her way up to the restaurant kitchen, becoming a cook and working with Alice Waters, who described her as "America's next great cooking teacher."

After leaving Chez Panisse, Nosrat worked in Italy and then other Berkeley-area restaurants. She worked as a sous-chef and took catering jobs before starting to teach private cooking classes in 2007. She has said that she soon felt that a television show would be a more efficient way of teaching; however, it would be years before that would happen.

She later worked with Michael Pollan, and was included in his book and the 2016 Netflix documentary television series Cooked as "the chef who taught Michael Pollan how to cook".

=== Salt Fat Acid Heat ===
==== Cookbook ====
Nosrat's 2017 cookbook Salt Fat Acid Heat, illustrated by Wendy MacNaughton and including a foreword by Michael Pollan, explains the fundamental principles of good cooking which she defines by the four pillars named in the title. Instead of focusing on recipes alone, each pillar has its own chapter where Nosrat teaches readers through stories and wisdom gained from her years as a professional chef and cooking teacher. Rare for a cookbook, it teaches readers "from the ground up, how to be a good cook," functioning more as a textbook than a recipe collection. The intention is that readers can improve their every day cooking with a fundamental understanding of food, improvising instead of needing to follow recipes. Published in 2017, it has remained on best-selling lists for over three years.

The book was named "Food Book of the Year" by The Times of London and was a New York Times best seller. The cookbook also won the 2018 James Beard Award for Best General Cookbook, was named Cookbook of the Year by the International Association of Culinary Professionals, and won the 2018 IACP Julia Child First Book Award. In 2019, it was named one of the ten "Best Cookbooks of the Century So Far" by Helen Rosner in The New Yorker.

==== Television show ====
A Netflix docu-series and travelogue based on the cookbook, also called Salt Fat Acid Heat, was released on October 11, 2018, with each of the four episodes based on one of the four elements of cooking set out in the title. In episode 1, Nosrat goes to Italy to talk about the use of fat in cooking; in episode 2, Japan for salt; in episode 3, Mexico for acid; and in episode 4, returns to the United States, cooking at Chez Panisse as well as with her own mother, to discuss heat. The show was described by The Washington Post as "unlike any other food show on TV" and helped launch Nosrat to "household-name status."

=== Home Cooking ===
In March 2020, Nosrat and friend Hrishikesh Hirway, who created the popular podcast Song Exploder, started the podcast Home Cooking, which set out to help people cook for themselves in the midst of the COVID-19 global health crisis. Originally planned as a four-part mini-series, the podcast continued to publish sporadic episodes over the course of the pandemic. In April 2025, Nosrat announced plans for an eight-episode season to be published later that year.

The show is structured as a cooking advice show where Nosrat answers listener questions about cooking. It initially started as a way of answering the question, "How do I use the things I have in my pantry?" during a time when people were over-buying particular ingredients out of fear early in the pandemic and didn't have access to many other things. It later grew beyond this type of troubleshooting.

The show won the 2021 iHeartRadio award for Best Food Show, and was named one of the best podcasts of 2020 by Time, Rolling Stone, Vulture, The Economist, and The Atlantic.

=== Good Things ===
Good Things, Nostrat's second cookbook was published in September 2025. It is a more classic cookbook, full of recipes.

Previously, Nosrat had announced a different concept for her second cookbook. Originally titled What to Cook, it was similar in approach to her first book and was about helping home cooks navigate the kitchen more similarly to professional cooks through four elements, the ones used for decision making: time, ingredients, resources, and preferences. Nosrat called them the "invisible set of constraints you face every time you set out to cook". In March 2025, Nosrat announced that the concept and title had changed to Good Things.

=== Other projects ===
From 2017 to 2021, Nosrat was a regular "Eat" columnist for The New York Times Magazine.

Also in 2019, she was included on Time's list of the 100 most influential people in the world.

In 2021, Nosrat made a guest appearance on Michelle Obama's children's cooking show called Waffles + Mochi on Netflix.

== Personal life ==
Nosrat lives in Oakland, California with her dog, Fava.

As of 2025, Nosrat was dating writer Ebony Haight.
