= Salt Fat Acid Heat (book) =

2017 cookbook by Samin Nosrat

Salt Fat Acid Heat: Mastering the Elements of Good Cooking
- First edition
- Authors: Samin Nosrat
- Illustrator: Wendy MacNaughton
- Published: 25 April 2017
- Publisher: Simon & Schuster
- ISBN: 978-1782112303
- Website: www.saltfatacidheat.com

Salt Fat Acid Heat: Mastering the Elements of Good Cooking is a 2017 cookbook written by the American chef Samin Nosrat and illustrated by Wendy MacNaughton. It was designed by Alvaro Villanueva.

It inspired the 2018 four-part Netflix cooking documentary series Salt Fat Acid Heat, which stars Nosrat.

== Contents ==
A reference book, it is focused on teaching techniques and structured around the four titular elements: salt, fat, acid, and heat. It explains what they are and how to master them in cooking in order to become a better, more intuitive cook. Nosrat explains that these are the defining factors which determine the flavor and texture of food when cooking, calling them the "cardinal directions" of cooking.

The whole book has MacNaughton's watercolor illustrations, infographics and hand-lettering throughout, and includes no photographs. The American food magazine Saveur described it as a "refreshing break from this contemporary formula" of "cleanly laid-out recipe facing an artful image of salad or toast". Nosrat insisted on illustrations so that readers would not feel as though there is only one way to cook each recipe, and would instead use the recipes as jumping-off points. Nosrat reached out to MacNaughton early on and the two had a close collaboration.

== History ==
Nosrat started working on it around 2009–10 when Michael Pollan, an author and cooking student of hers, learned about her four-part system and encouraged her to write a book about it. She developed a curriculum based on the concept and taught many classes on it to develop the material. Throughout the process, Nosrat noted which concepts were easier to convey visually and started to design diagrams to help explain them. These also formed the foundation of diagrams in the book which give an overview, for example of sources of acid or salt.

Overall, Nosrat worked on it for 7 years. The content was developed over time through her teaching, then the proposal took four years to prepare: three to write it, then Nosrat worked for another year with MacNaughton on the illustrations. She wanted the proposal to be illustrated because the approach was different enough from the standard cookbook that she felt it was needed to convince publishers. The finished proposal went to auction, was sold in 2013 and then published four years later in 2017.

== Reception ==
It received positive reviews from many established publications, including Saveur, The Atlantic, and Food52. It was named "Food Book of the Year" by The Times and was a New York Times best seller.

Even after its publication in 2017, it remained on best-seller list for years. In 2019, it was named one of the ten "Best Cookbooks of the Century So Far" by Helen Rosner in The New Yorker. Rosner described the book as helpful for cooks of all skill levels, seeing it "as a guide for beginners in need of essential egg-scrambling techniques or for experienced cooks looking to burnish their confidence and bolster their skills". Rosner said that this is the rare reference book which is meant to be read straight-through and which "flat-out teach[es] you, from the ground up, how to be a good cook".

== Awards ==
It won the 2018 James Beard Award for Best General Cookbook, and was named Cookbook of the Year by the International Association of Culinary Professionals.
