= Cooked (TV series) =

2016 American docu-series on Netflix

- Genre: Documentary
- Created by: Alex Gibney
- Starring: Michael Pollan; Isaac Pollan
- Country of origin: United States
- Original language: English
- No. of seasons: 1
- No. of episodes: 4

Production
- Running time: 50-58 min.

Original release
- Network: Netflix
- Release: February 19, 2016

Cooked is a 2016 original Netflix documentary series created by Alex Gibney based on the book by Michael Pollan with the same title, starring Michael Pollan and Isaac Pollan. It explains the history and different aspects of cooking, and its ability to connect us as human beings.

== Premise ==
In 'Cooked', Michael Pollan explores food past and present through the four elemental categories — fire, water, air and earth. The series is based on Pollan's book with same title.

== Cast ==
- Michael Pollan

== Release ==
It was released on February 2, 2016 on Netflix streaming.
