= Bonnie Tsui =

American author and journalist

- Occupation: Novelist

Bonnie Tsui (born 1977) is an American author and journalist of Hong Kong descent. She was born in New York, New York, graduated from Harvard University,.

American Chinatown: A People’s History of Five Neighborhoods was published by Simon & Schuster's Free Press in 2009. The Los Angeles Times said it "explored their class struggles, rivalries, customs and dialects," of the cities' Chinatowns. Tsui also contributes essays and cultural commentary to well-known American magazines, including The New York Times and California Sunday. In 2020, she published a memoir, Why We Swim, with Algonquin Books, which delves into the history of swimming. The New York Times called it an enthusiastic and thoughtful work. Her third book, Sarah & the Big Wave, about big-wave women surfers, was published by Henry Holt Books for Young Readers in 2021.

She is a member of the San Francisco Writers Grotto.

== Personal life ==
Bonnie is married and has two children. The family lives in Berkeley, California. She grew up a competitive swimmer.

== Awards ==
Her accolades include the 2019 National Press Foundation Fellowship and the Jane Rainie Opel Young Alumna Award at Harvard University. Her book American Chinatown: A People’s History of Five Neighborhoods won a 2009-2010 Asian/Pacific American Award for Literature.

== Works ==
- American Chinatown: A People’s History of Five Neighborhoods (2009)
- Why We Swim (2020)
- Sarah & the Big Wave (2021)
- On Muscle (2025)
