= Pickling salt =

Fine-grained salt used for manufacturing pickles

Pickling salt is a type of salt used most often for the preparation of pickles, among other preserved foods. Pickling salt primarily consists of sodium chloride, similarly to table salt. However, unlike most table salt, it does not contain iodine or any anti caking products. A widely circulated legend suggests that iodisation caused the brine of pickles to change color, which is false. However, some anti-caking agents are known to accumulate at the bottom of the jars or cause the brine to cloud, a minor aesthetic issue. Pickling salt is very fine, accelerating dissolution when creating a brine, making it suitable for salty solutions.

== Alternative use cases ==
Pickling salt has various applications outside of pickling. It can be used in place of table salt, although with the risk of agglomeration. Dehydrating—generally by heating the salt or introducing a desiccant such as rice—generally undoes this effect. Pickling salt has a tendency to cling to food, making it an adequate replacement for fine popcorn salt.
