= Helen Rosner =

American food writer and editor

- Born: Chicago, Illinois, U.S.
- Education: Smith College (BA)
- Awards: James Beard Foundation Award (2016, 2024, 2025)

Helen Rosner is an American food writer and editor. She is a staff writer for The New Yorker and winner of three James Beard Foundation Awards.

== Education ==
Rosner graduated from Smith College with a degree in philosophy in 2004.

== Career ==
Rosner is a staff writer for The New Yorker. From 2014 to 2017, she was an editor at Eater, serving as long-form features editor and later executive editor. She joined Eater after spending four years as executive digital editor at Saveur. Prior to that, she was online restaurant editor for New York Magazine and an assistant cookbook editor at Workman. With Raphael Brion, she co-founded the food blog Eat Me Daily, which "carved out a vital place in a crowded food blog world by being smarter, wittier, and faster than everyone else," according to Rosner's colleague, Eater co-founder Lockhart Steele. Rosner and Brion initially wrote the blog under pseudonyms. Rosner's essay "On Chicken Tenders," published in Guernica, won the 2016 James Beard Foundation Journalism award for Personal Essay.

When Rosner tweeted about a roast chicken recipe using a hair dryer to dry the chicken before cooking, this drew many responses, including criticism that she responded to with details about the technique.

In 2018, Rosner was nominated for the James Beard Foundation M.F.K. Fisher Distinguished Writing Award for her piece, "Christ in the Garden of Endless Breadsticks." In 2024 she won the Beard Craig Claiborne Distinguished Criticism Award and in 2025 won a Beard award for her profile of Padma Lakshmi.

== Bibliography ==
- Rosner, Helen (May 19, 2024). "The glittering pleasure of a perfect raw bar". Culture. The Food Scene. The New Yorker. (Note: Available on website only.)
- — (June 3, 2024). "Penny 90 E. 10th St". Goings On. About Town. Tables for Two. The New Yorker. 100 (15): 7. (Note: Note change in Department title from 'Goings on About Town' to 'Goings On. About Town', with further sub-divisions for event categories.) (Note: Content previously published online as "The glittering pleasure of a perfect raw bar" (May 19, 2024).)

———————

Bibliography notes
