= Salt Fat Acid Heat =

American documentary cooking show on Netflix

- Genre: Food; Documentary
- Based on: Salt Fat Acid Heat by Samin Nosrat
- Directed by: Caroline Suh
- Starring: Samin Nosrat
- Theme music composer: Fall On Your Sword
- No. of seasons: 1
- No. of episodes: 4

Production
- Executive producers: Bet Cotner; Alex Gibney; Zana Lawrence; Lisa Nishimuru; Samin Nosrat; Stacey Offman; Caroline Suh; Stefano Biraghi
- Cinematography: Luke McCoubrey
- Running time: 40–48 minutes
- Production company: Jigsaw Productions

Original release
- Network: Netflix
- Release: October 11, 2018

Salt Fat Acid Heat is an American cooking documentary television series starring Samin Nosrat. Based on her 2017 book of the same name, the four-part series premiered on Netflix on October 11, 2018.

The show and book's title comes from Nosrat's proposed four elements of successful cooking: salt, fat, acid, and heat. Each installment of the series focuses on a particular element, with Nosrat traveling to a different location to demonstrate how the element is used in local cuisine. In each episode, Nosrat has guides who walk her through their homeland's cuisine while she pulls out the lessons related to each fundamental element. The show is "part how-to guide for home cooks of all skill levels and part aspirational travelogue".

== Episodes ==
No.	Title	Original release date
1	"Fat"	October 11, 2018
Nosrat visits Italy, looking at important fats in foods including olive oil, cheese, and meat.
2	"Salt"	October 11, 2018
In Japan, Nosrat explores how salt is included in traditional cuisine, including soy sauce and miso.
3	"Acid"	October 11, 2018
Nosrat goes to the Yucatán Peninsula in Mexico to learn about different kinds of acid in cooking.
4	"Heat"	October 11, 2018
Nosrat returns to her hometown, Berkeley, California, and visits Chez Panisse, the first restaurant she worked at, where she discusses the importance of heat. She also hosts a feast in her home, cooking alongside her Iranian mother.

== Reception ==
The show has received positive reviews from critics. On the review aggregator Rotten Tomatoes, the series has a 100% approval rating based on nine reviews, with an average rating of 7.5 out of 10.

Maura Judkis of The Washington Post called it "unlike any other food show on TV", particularly mentioning the high proportion of women and home cooks featured on the show.

For Eater, Greg Morabito described Nosrat as "a charming host", and applauded her and director Caroline Suh for conceiving of a "completely new style of culinary TV show".

Doreen St. Félix's review in The New Yorker ascribed the show's success to "Nosrat's uncommon earnestness on camera". St. Félix also described how the show gives viewers a feeling of nostalgia for something most people have not experienced: local, high-quality ingredients enjoyed in the beautiful vistas of their countries of origin.

== History ==
Nosrat began teaching cooking classes in 2007 and found it a very inefficient way of teaching. Even before she wrote the book on which the TV show is based, she thought about TV as a great way to reach a wider audience. She recalled the moment:

"And after two or three classes, I was like, Man, if I had a TV show, I could get to so many people … Just like I had not seen a book that sets out to teach, I had not seen a show that really sets out to teach."

== See also ==
- Samin Nosrat
