= List of 2011 This American Life episodes =

In 2011, there were 31 new This American Life episodes.

- Episode 423 – "The Invention of Money"
  - Act 1: The Lie That Saved Brazil – Chana Joffe-Walt
  - Act 2: Weekend at Bernanke's – Alex Blumberg and David Kestenbaum
- Episode 424 – "Kid Politics"
  - Act 1: Trickle Down History – Starlee Kine
  - Act 2: Climate Changes. People Don't – Ira Glass
  - Act 3: Minor Authorities – Jyllian Gunther
- Episode 425 – "Slow to React"
  - Act 1: When I Grow Up – David Holthouse
  - Act 2: Isn't It Slow-Mantic – Sean Lewis
  - Act 3: I'm Still Here – Jonathan Menjivar
- Episode 426 – "Tough Room 2011"
  - Act 1: Make 'Em Laff – Ira Glass
  - Act 2: Bar Car Prophesy – Rosie Schaap
  - Act 3: Mission: Impossible – Jane Feltes
  - Act 4: Contrails of My Ears – Brett Martin
- Episode 427 – "Original Recipe"
  - Act 1: Message in a Bottle – Ira Glass
  - Act 2: Ask Not What Your Handwriting Authenticator Can Do For You; Ask What You Can Do For Your Handwriting Authenticator – Jake Halpern
- Episode 428 – "Oh You Shouldn't Have"
  - Act 1: Act One
  - Act 2: Act Two
  - Act 3: Act Three
  - Act 4: Act Four
- Episode 429 – "Will They Know Me Back Home?"
  - Act 1: Act One
  - Act 2: Act Two
- Episode 430 – "Very Tough Love"
  - Act 1: Act One
  - Act 2: Act Two
- Episode 431 – "See No Evil"
  - Act 1: Blood Brothers
  - Act 2: Denying the Invisible
  - Act 3: I Worked at The Kennedy Center and All I Got Was This Lousy T-shirt
- Episode 432 – "Know When to Fold 'Em"
  - Act 1: Is This War or Is This Hearts?
  - Act 2: Kings Do Not Fold.
  - Act 3: Gin Rummy.
  - Act 4: Solitaire and Everything's Wild
- Episode 433 – "Fine Print 2011"
  - Act 1: One Pill, Two Pill, Red Pill, Blue Pill
  - Act 2: Occupancy May Be Revoked Without Notice – David Rakoff
  - Act 3: Side Effects May Include... – Nancy Updike
  - Act 4: May Be Hazardous to Children
- Episode 434 – "This Week"
  - Act 1: Sunday Night, State College PA
  - Act 2: Monday, Cairo, Egypt
  - Act 3: Monday, Tucson, AZ
  - Act 4: Saturday to Wednesday: CA, NY, WI, ME
  - Act 5: Wednesday, Tuscaloosa, AL
  - Act 6: Thursday, Greensvile, SC
  - Act 7: Saturday and Sunday, Gainesville and Coral Springs, FL
- Episode 435 – "How To Create a Job"
  - Act 1: Can the Government Move My Cheese?
  - Act 2: This Story May Be Recorded For Training and Quality Assurance
  - Act 3: Job Fairies
  - Act 4: Be Cool, Stay in School
- Episode 436 – "The Psychopath Test"
  - Act 1: Underachievement Test
  - Act 2: King of the Forest – Jon Ronson
  - Act 3: The Results Are In
- Episode 437 – "Old Boys Network"
  - Act 1: Messing With the Bull
  - Act 2: Donkey See, Donkey Do
- Episode 438 – "Father's Day 2011"
  - Act 1: Astro Boy Meet Robot Dad
  - Act 2: I Just Called to Say Something That's Hard to Say, That I Should Really Say More Often...
  - Act 3: Mister Baby Monitor
  - Act 4: Bring Your Child To Work Detail
- Episode 439 – "A House Divided"
  - Act 1: War of Northern Aggression
  - Act 2: Split a Gut
  - Act 3: Don't Make Me Separate You
- Episode 440 – "Game Changer"
  - Act 1: You've Got Shale
  - Act 2: Ground War
- Episode 441 – "When Patents Attack!"
  - Act 1: Act One
  - Act 2: Act Two
- Episode 442 – "Thugs"
  - Act 1: Thug Me? No, Thug You
  - Act 2: Lifers
- Episode 443 – "Amusement Park"
  - Act 1: Gameboy Grows Up
  - Act 2: Great Adventures
  - Act 3: What I Didn't Do On My Summer Vacation—with Jonathan Goldstein
- Episode 444 – "Gossip"
  - Act 1: Act One
  - Act 2: Act Two
- Episode 445 – "Ten Years In"
  - Act 1: Kabul Kabul Kabul Kabul Chameleon
  - Act 2: In the Garden of the Unknown Unknowns
  - Act 3: Put on a Happy Face
  - Act 4: What's Arabic for Fjord?
  - Act 5: Bad Teacher
  - Act 6: Clutter
- Episode 446 – "Living Without (2011)"
  - Act 1: Do You Hear What I Hear?
  - Act 2: Yerrrrr Out!
  - Act 3: The Call of the Great Indoors
  - Act 4: Tin Man
- Episode 447 – "The Incredible Case of the P.I. Moms"
  - Act 1: A Pretty Dame Walks In
  - Act 2: His Partner Drops a Dime
- Episode 448 – "Adventure!"
  - Act 1: Chinese Checkmate
  - Act 2: Oh, the Places We'll Go
- Episode 449 – "Middle School"
  - Act 1: Life in the Hormonal Lane
  - Act 2: Stutter Step
  - Act 3: Mimis in the Middle
  - Act 4: Anchor Babies
  - Act 5: Blue Kid on the Block
  - Act 6: Grande with Sugar
- Episode 450 – "So Crazy It Just Might Work"
  - Act 1: Mr. Holland's Opus
  - Act 2: Benny Takes A Jet
- Episode 451 – "Back to Penn State"
  - Act 1: Say It Ain't So, Joe
  - Act 2: Tonight We're Gonna Party Like It's 2009
- Episode 452 – "Poultry Slam 2011"
  - Act 1: Witness for the Barbecue-tion
  - Act 2: Murder Most Fowl
  - Act 3: Latin Liver
- Episode 453 – "Nemeses"
  - Act 1: Solidarity for Never
  - Act 2: A Tale of Two Jerseys
