= Lies, Sissies, and Fiascoes: The Best of This American Life =

Compilation album by This American Life
- Released: May 4, 1999
- Recorded: 1995–1999
- Genre: Talk radio
- Length: 155:55
- Language: English
- Label: Rhino Entertainment

This American Life chronology
| This American Life: Hand It Over -- Stories from Our First Year on the Air (1996) | Lies, Sissies, and Fiascoes: The Best of This American Life (1999) | Crimebusters + Crossed Wires: Stories from This American Life (2003) |

Professional ratings
Review scores
| Source | Rating |
|---|---|
| Allmusic | link |

Lies, Sissies, and Fiascoes: The Best of This American Life is the second compilation album featuring radio broadcasts from This American Life. The two-disc set contains contributions by Dishwasher Pete, Ira Glass, Jack Hitt, Sandra Tsing Loh, David Sedaris, and Sarah Vowell. The cover was created by Chris Ware.

== Track listing ==
1. Jack Hitt – Peter Pan – 20:12
2. David Sedaris – Drama Bug – 11:40
3. Dishwasher Pete – Letterman! Cookies! – 13:09
4. Sandra Tsing Loh – Mr. Loh's Not Afraid to Be Naked – 10:08
5. Cheryl Trykv – Teen Getaway – 12:41
6. Sarah Vowell – Shooting Dad – 11:06
7. Ira Glass – Get Over It! – 16:27
8. Rob Bindler – Hands on a Hard Body – 16:45
9. Scott Carrier – The Test – 15:34
10. David Rakoff – Christmas Freud – 15:48
11. Marissa Bridge – Apology Line – 12:25

== See also ==
- Crimebusters + Crossed Wires: Stories from This American Life
- This American Life: Hand It Over -- Stories from Our First Year on the Air
- Stories of Hope and Fear
