= Amanda Williams (judge) =

American judge

Retired Superior Court Judge, Brunswick Circuit, Georgia
- In office 1991–2011

Personal details
- Born: December 12, 1946 (age 79) Albany, Georgia
- Spouse: James G. Williams
- Children: Nathan, Frances, Susanne
- Education: University of Georgia; John Marshall Law School
- Occupation: Lawyer
- Profession: Legal

Amanda F. Williams (born December 12, 1946) is a former Superior Court judge on the Brunswick Circuit in Georgia. Her treatment of defendants in drug court was the subject of a March 25, 2011, episode of This American Life. Following an ethics probe launched in November 2011, she announced her resignation from the judgeship in early 2012.

== Biography ==
Williams graduated with a Bachelor of Fine Arts from the University of Georgia and a Juris Doctor from John Marshall Law School in Atlanta, Georgia. She was admitted to the bar in 1977.

Prior to being elected a judge, Williams was a law clerk for Superior Court Judge William R. Killian in 1978–79, an assistant district attorney for Brunswick Judicial Circuit in 1979–80, and a practicing attorney in Glynn County in 1980–90. Williams was elected a Superior Court judge in 1990, taking the bench in 1991. In November 2010 Williams competed against Mary Helen Moses in her most recent bid for re-election. Williams won with 66.2% of the vote.

== This American Life story ==
In March 2011, the radio program This American Life broadcast an episode titled "Very Tough Love" about various cases heard in Williams's drug court. The show described how Williams's judgments violated the philosophy of drug courts by using indefinite jail terms and an overly punitive approach. This resulted in unfavorable reaction from other legal professionals, calls for her resignation or impeachment, and death threats.

Criticism of Williams following the show included claims that at times she imposed indefinite stays in jail and other excessively punitive sentences contrary to principles supported by the National Association of Drug Court Professionals. The Association supports the principle that "drug courts are designed to reduce drug use, reduce crime, repair families, hold addicts accountable and restore them to meaningful roles in society."

After the story aired, Williams hired David G. Oedel, a law professor at Mercer University, who published an open letter to This American Life executive producer Ira Glass, claiming that the story was "riddled with falsehoods," and "libel masquerading as journalism." Glass responded a week later, correcting website errors of which he was informed. However, Glass stood by the story's details, especially his characterization of defendants receiving inappropriately harsh treatment in Williams's courtroom. In response to Oedel's threat to sue for defamation, the show's lawyers defended Glass and asserted that Williams's conduct "is certainly a matter of keen public interest".

Williams defended her approach explaining, "there's some addiction in my family. My husband has been in recovery for over 15 years. And about the time I started looking to start a drug court about 1996, he had gotten into recovery. So we've lived it as a family. Because all the family members are touched by it."

In February 2012, Long Island University announced that "Very Tough Love" won a 2011 George Polk Award for Radio Reporting.

On February 22, 2012, the woman whose case prompted Glass to investigate and broadcast the episode was released from probation by Glynn County Magistrate Timothy Barton, who replaced Williams. He also purged two forgery convictions from her record as per the Georgia conditional discharge statute. When asked to comment, Barton stated, "I thought seven years was long enough."

== Ethics probe ==
On November 9, 2011, the Georgia Judicial Qualifications Commission (JQC) filed a 14-count ethics complaint against Williams, alleging she had incarcerated defendants indefinitely, made false statements, and engaged in nepotism and "tyrannical partiality". The JQC appointed Leah Ward Sears to prosecute the ethics charges. Sears is a former Georgia Supreme Court Chief Justice who left the court in 2009. A hearing was scheduled to be held in 2012 to determine whether and how Williams should be disciplined. On November 16, 2011, one of five Superior Court judges in Williams's circuit district stated Judge Williams had stepped down from her drug court position and would stop hearing criminal cases until the investigation has been completed. Williams continued to work on civil cases previously assigned to her but did not accept new case assignments.

=== Resignation ===
Judge Williams sent a letter to Governor Nathan Deal in mid-December 2011, indicating her intention to step down from the bench effective January 2, 2012. The JQC agreed to drop charges after Williams tendered her resignation. She also signed a consent order prohibiting her from seeking judicial office, effective immediately. Georgia Attorney General Sam Olens appointed a special prosecutor to determine if Williams should face felony criminal charges for allegedly lying to JQC investigators. A conviction would result in forfeiture of an annual $74,000 state pension and disbarment.

=== Investigation ===
Fulton District Attorney Paul Howard was appointed special prosecutor, and there were no public statements until September 2012 when a spokesperson for Howard stated, "The case is still under investigation. There are no further updates to report at this time." On June 3, 2015, a Fulton County grand jury indicted Williams on two counts, making false statements and violating her oath by making false statements. Charges against Williams were dropped in May 2017 with the consent and consultation of Ms. Dills who was the person whose story of was told in "Very Tough Love" after a law was changed disallowing the practice of secretly recording a judge's statements. As such the actual tapes containing clearly false statements made by the judge became inadmissible evidence in court.

== See also ==
- Drug courts in the United States
