= Drug courts in the United States =

Specialized court docket programs

In the United States, drug courts are specialized court docket programs that aim to help participants recover from substance use disorder to reduce future criminal activity. Drug courts are used as an alternative to incarceration and aim to reduce the costs of repeatedly processing low‐level, non‐violent offenders through courts, jails, and prisons. Drug courts are usually managed by a nonadversarial and multidisciplinary team including judges, prosecutors, defense attorneys, community corrections, social workers and treatment service professionals. Drug court participants include criminal defendants and offenders, juvenile offenders, and parents with pending child welfare cases.

== History ==
The first drug court, in Miami-Dade County, was designed by Chief Judge Gerald Wetherington, Judge Herbert Klein, then State Attorney Janet Reno, and public defender Bennett Brummer for nonviolent offenders to receive treatment. This model of court system quickly became a popular method for dealing with an ever-increasing number of drug offenders. Between 1984 and 1999, the number of defendants charged with a drug offense in the federal courts increased 3% annually, from 11,854 to 29,306. By 1999, there were 472 drug courts in the United States. By 2005, that number had increased to 1262, with another 575 drug courts in the planning stages.

== Operations ==
Drug courts operate under a model that combines intensive judicial supervision, mandatory drug testing, escalating sanctions, and treatment to help offenders with substance use disorders break the cycle of addiction and the crime that accompanies it. In 1997, the National Association of Drug Court Professionals published Defining Drug Courts: The Key Components, designed to provide courts with a model which can be adapted to fit the specific needs of the community.

=== Key components ===
- Drug courts integrate alcohol and other drug treatment services with justice system case processing.
- Using a non-adversarial approach, prosecution and defense counsel promote public safety. Participants must waive their due process rights to a speedy trial and sign a pre-emptive confession before being allowed to participate.
- Eligible participants are identified early and promptly placed in the drug court program.
- Drug courts provide access to a continuum of alcohol, drug, and other related treatment and rehabilitation services.
- Abstinence is monitored by frequent drug testing (including alcohol).
- A coordinated strategy governs drug court responses to participants' compliance.
- Ongoing judicial interaction with each drug court participant is essential.
- Monitoring and evaluation measure the achievement of program goals and gauge effectiveness.
- Continuing interdisciplinary education promotes effective drug court planning, implementation, and operations.
- Forging partnerships among drug courts, public agencies, and community-based organizations generates local support and enhances their effectiveness.

== Recidivism rates ==
Some studies, largely those produced by drug court professional associations, show that recidivism rates for drug court clients are lower than those of standard dockets. The average recidivism rate for those who complete drug court is between 4% and 29%, in contrast to 48% for those who do not participate in a drug court program. A 2003 recidivism report by the Urban Institute and Caliber Associates called "Recidivism Rates For Drug Court Graduates: National Based Estimates", representative of over 17,000 annual drug court graduates nationwide, found that recidivism rates for Drug Court participants one year after graduation is a mere 16.5% and only 27.5% after two years. In a nationally representative sample of more than 2,000 graduates from 95 different drug courts, the average re-arrest rate was only about 16% in the first year after leaving the program and 27% after the second year. This compares highly favorably to typical recidivism rates on conventional probation, in which roughly 46% of offenders commit a new offense and over 60% commit a probation violation. A recent study of nine courts in California found that re-arrest rates over a four-year period were 29% for drug court participants (and only 17% for drug court graduates) as compared to 41% for similar drug offenders who did not participate in drug court. Another study of four adult drug courts in Suffolk County, Massachusetts, found that drug court participants were 13% less likely to be re-arrested, 34% less likely to be re-convicted, and 24% less likely to be re-incarcerated than probationers who had been carefully matched to the drug court participants using "propensity score" analyses.

== Costs and benefits ==
There is mixed evidence on whether drug courts save money or cost more per participant than traditional courts. Studies in the mid-2000s computed the average cost savings per participant. Results revealed average cost savings ranging from nearly $3,000 to over $12,000 per client. Depending upon the size of a given program, in some counties, the aggregate cost savings exceeded $7 to $9 million per year. About 120,000 individuals are treated annually in drug courts, which creates more than $1 billion in annual savings. Overall, it is estimated that the current adult drug court treatment program produces about $2.21 in benefit for every $1 in costs, for a net benefit to society of about $624 million. Studies have shown that 1.5 million arrestees who are probably guilty (the population most likely to participate in court-monitored substance use disorder treatment) are at risk of a substance use disorder. Treating those 1.5 million at-risk arrestees through drug court would cost more than $13.7 billion and return benefits of about $46 billion.

In 2013 the National Institute of Justice performed a Multisite Adult Drug Court Evaluation that assessed the cost-effectiveness of the Drug Court Model in comparison to the normal probationary program. The National Institute of Justice assessed that for every $1.00 spent there was $1.50 in benefits. This more current literature contradicts the previously held belief by The Urban Institute that assessed in 2004 that cost-benefit was $2.00 for every $1.00 spent. This means that the current literature believes that there is no statistical significance between the cost-effectiveness of the current drug court model as opposed to the ordinary court probation model.

On the other hand, there are many studies by non-partisan research institutions which show that drug courts are cost-positive. In a meta-analysis of 86 drug courts, which includes the full cost of rehabs and wrap-around services and drug court externalities, the Brookings Institution concluded in 2012 that the benefits of drug court "probably [do] not" outweigh its costs, noting that "on average, drug court will cost $5,000 more per participant than is yielded in benefits, and there is only a 14% chance that benefits will exceed costs". Similarly, the UK Ministry of Justice concludes that drug courts are cost-positive by £4,633 per participant.

== Juvenile drug court ==
Drug courts not only apply to adults but to juveniles as well. The need for a juvenile drug court can be indicated by the extent of a drug being associated with delinquency, the ability of the juvenile justice system to use treatment, supervision, and other services, as the accountability that the juvenile and the service providers are given by the juvenile justice system. Established in 1995, the first juvenile drug court in the United States was in Wilmington, Delaware. As of 2020, there were 300 juvenile drug courts across the 50 states and Washington, D.C.

== National Association of Drug Court Professionals ==
The National Association of Drug Court Professionals (NADCP) is a non-profit organization founded in 1994 to reduce the negative social impact of substance use, crime, and recidivism. The NADCP advocates for the establishment, growth, and funding of drug courts and provides for the collection and dissemination of information. In 1997 the National Drug Court Institute (NDCI) was established by the Office of National Drug Control Policy as part of NADCP. NDCI is funded through the Bureau of Justice Assistance (BJA) within the U.S. Department of Justice, and the National Highway Traffic Safety Administration (NHTSA) within the U.S. Department of Transportation. NDCI provides comprehensive drug court training series for practitioners and disseminates research, evaluations, and relevant commentary. NDCI stages over 130 training events each year.

== Criticism and controversies ==
In recent years, drug courts and drug court research have become the subject of significant criticism. Academic research questions both the constitutionality of drug courts and the potential denial or limitation of defendants' rights caused by the drug court model. Others, such as former drug court Judge Morris Hoffman, have theorized that drug courts "cause net widening due to the increased willingness by police to arrest offenders should they receive treatment versus jail time and an increased willingness by offenders to try drugs when facing less serious legal consequences."

Similarly, while the majority of drug court research supports the concepts of reduced recidivism rates and cost savings, the methodologies of these studies have come under fire. The opportunity costs associated with wraparound services—rehabs, transitional living facilities, etc.—which may promote reductions in recidivism rates are rarely included in cost analyses of drug courts, nor are the externalities associated with crimes committed by offenders who are free through drug court dockets, versus incarcerated under the traditional model. A preliminary study conducted by the Brookings Institution called "A Bayesian Meta-Analysis of Drug Court Cost-Effectiveness", which analyzed 86 existing drug court studies, concluded that drug courts are probably cost-positive, not cost-negative. Other works, including a 2007 white paper and a 2025 study in the American Journal of Sociology concluded that selection bias invalidated many of the studies suggesting drug courts reduce recidivism rates. The Justice Policy Institute and Drug Policy Alliance released papers in 2011 which were harshly critical of the drug court model.

Several recent drug court scandals made national news, including that of 17-year-old Lindsey Dills, who was sentenced to 14 months in jail and 5.5 years of probation for two forged checks of $20 and $40. In another controversial case, Judge Richard Baumgartner, an ex-addict and Knox County, Tennessee's Drug Court Judge, pleaded guilty to criminal misconduct for hearing cases while using drugs, purchasing drugs from defendants in his courtroom, and having sex in his chambers with defendants. In St. Clair County, Illinois, Drug Court Judge Joseph Christ died of a drug overdose. Christ and another judge purchased their drugs from a drug court probation officer. Christ also released a defendant who was one of his alleged drug dealers.

== See also ==
- Drugs in the United States
- Amanda Williams, a Superior Court judge on the Brunswick Circuit in Georgia. Her treatment of defendants in drug court was the subject of an episode of Ira Glass's This American Life.

== Suggested reading ==
- Brummer, Bennett H. and Rodham, Hugh, "Miami’s Drug Court: Leading the Way", Cornerstone, National Legal Aid and Defender Association, Spring 1993.
- Clayton, Robert M.; (1999). "Missouri's Experience with Drug Courts". Spectrum, 72, 30–32.
- Craddock, Amy; Rochester City Drug Treatment Court. (1999). Rochester Drug Treatment Court Participation Characteristics 1995-1998. Rochester.
- Finn, Peter, and Newlyn, Andrea K.; National Institute of Justice. (1993). Miami's "Drug Court" A Different Approach. Washington, D.C.: U.S. Department of Justice.
- Goldkamp, John S. and Weiland, Doris; National Institute of Justice. (1993). Assessing the Impact of Dade County's Felony Drug Court. Washington, D.C.: U.S. Department of Justice.
- Huddleston, C. West; (1998). "Drug Courts and Jail-Based Treatment". Corrections Today, 60. 98–101.
- Kaye (1999). "Making the Case for Hands-On Courts". Newsweek, 134, 11.
- Mountjoy, John J. (1999). "Drug Courts: Making Prison Sentences a Thing of the Past?" Spectrum, 72, 2–4.
- National Institute of Justice. (2006). Drug Courts: The Second Decade. CJ 211081. Washington, D.C.: U.S. Department of Justice. This report synthesizes the following research:
  - Anspach, Donald F. and Ferguson, Andrew S.; Assessing the Efficacy of Treatment Modalities in the Context of Adult Drug Courts, Final Report. Grant No. 2000–DC–VX–0008.
  - Carey, Shannon M. and Finigan, Michael W.; Detailed Cost Analysis in a Mature Drug Court Setting: A Cost-Benefit Evaluation of the Multnomah County Drug Court. Grant No. 2000–DC–VX–K004.
  - Finigan, Michael W., and Carey, Shannon M.; Analysis of 26 Drug Courts: Lessons Learned, Final Report. (Commissioned paper, 2002).
  - Goldkamp, John S., White, Michael D. and Robinson, Jennifer B.; From Whether to How Drug Courts Work: Retrospective Evaluation of Two Pioneering Drug Courts in Clark County (Las Vegas) and Multnomah County (Portland), Phase II Report from the National Evaluation of Drug Courts. Grant No. 98–DC–VX–K001.
- Roman, John, Townsend, Wendy and Bhati, Avinash Singh; (2003). Recidivism Rates for Drug Court Graduates: Nationally Based Estimates, Final Report. NCJ 201229.
- Thomas, Stephen. 2009. "Texas Drug Courts: Are the Ten Key Components being utilized?" Applied Research Project. Texas State University-San Marcos.
