= Syrco Bakker =

Dutch chef and entrepreneur

Syrco Bakker (Veghel, 14 November 1984) is a Dutch chef of Indonesian descent. He was head chef of Pure C, where he earned two Michelin stars. In 2022 he was named Chef of the Year by Gault&Millau. He has restaurants in Ubud, Bali and in Ras Al Khaimah, United Arab Emirates.

== Biography ==
Bakker grew up in Oisterwijk. His maternal grandparents are from Indonesia. His father, Cos Bakker, is from the north of the Netherlands and was a teacher and, until his retirement, deputy director of the Hotel Management School De Rooi Pannen in Tilburg. He later became an entrepreneur in Indonesian food products under his own brand. Cos Bakker came to know Indonesian cuisine through his wife, who also worked at the hotel school, and his mother-in-law, who taught him to prepare traditional family dishes.

Syrco Bakker had ambitions to become an entrepreneur from a young age. He worked various jobs, including as a dishwasher in a restaurant, where he developed an interest in hospitality. He studied hotel management at De Rooi Pannen in Tilburg. During his final year, he did an internship at the Michelin-starred restaurant De Librije under Jonnie Boer, after which he decided not to pursue further hotel education and instead focus entirely on a career as a chef. He spent several years working abroad, including with starred chefs Jean-Georges Klein in France and Gordon Ramsay in London. At the age of 22, he returned to the Netherlands, where he was hired at the three-Michelin-starred restaurant Oud Sluis under Sergio Herman and quickly rose to the position of sous chef.

In 2010, Bakker became head chef of Pure C in Cadzand, Sergio Herman's other restaurant. Under his leadership, Pure C earned its first Michelin star in 2011 and a second star in 2019. In early 2022, Bakker was named Chef of the Year by Gault&Millau for his "creative and often daring style." He was known for his nasi goreng, which he served as a fine dining dish.

At the end of 2022, Bakker left Pure C to focus on entrepreneurship. As a result, Pure C became the first Dutch restaurant to lose its stars under Michelin's new rules. Bakker contributed to several commercial projects of his own and of smaller producers focused on Indonesian cuisine and alcoholic beverages.

In 2024, he founded the restaurant Syrco BASÈ in Ubud, Bali, temporarily relocating with his family to Bali. That same year, he began executing plans for a restaurant in the national monument D'Ouwe Schoole in the border municipality of Retranchement, between Knokke and Cadzand, involving an extensive renovation. In 2025, he opened the restaurant Farmhouse by Syrco at The Ritz-Carlton Al Wadi Desert in Ras Al Khaimah, United Arab Emirates.
