= Crimebusters + Crossed Wires: Stories from This American Life =

Compilation album by This American Life
- Released: November 11, 2003
- Recorded: 1999–2003
- Genre: Talk radio
- Length: >120:00
- Language: English
- Label: Shout! Factory

This American Life chronology
Lies, Sissies, and Fiascoes: The Best of This American Life (1999)	Crimebusters + Crossed Wires: Stories from This American Life (2003)	Stories of Hope and Fear (2006)

Crimebusters + Crossed Wires: Stories from This American Life is a compilation album featuring radio broadcasts from This American Life. The two-disc set contains contributions by Ira Glass, David Sedaris, and Sarah Vowell.

== Track listing ==
1. Squirrel Cop
2. Loser
3. Flight vs. Invisibility
4. Watching the Detective
5. The Greatest Phone Message of All Time
6. Jesus Shaves
7. Say It to Me in Guy Language
8. When the Wall Came Tumbling Down
9. Everyone Speaks Elton John
10. Music Lessons

== See also ==
- This American Life: Hand It Over -- Stories from Our First Year on the Air
- Lies, Sissies, and Fiascoes: The Best of This American Life
- Stories of Hope and Fear
