= Very Tough Love =

Radio Documentary

Very Tough Love is a radio documentary and an episode of This American Life (TAL), which originally aired on March 25, 2011. The segment described a drug court and program in Glynn County, Georgia, which conducts itself in a manner unlike other drug courts throughout the United States. Offenders with no prior criminal record or history of drug abuse or addiction, charged with possession of small drug quantities, would wind up under drug court control for five years or more. In most other jurisdictions, the same offenses would result in probation or a drug education class. These charges went contrary to drug court philosophy, according to standards set by the National Association of Drug Court Professionals.

== New project ==
In the spring of 2010, TAL staff took on a different challenge: follow the methods used by Charles Salter in the 1970s when he wrote hundreds of "Georgia Rambler" columns for the Atlanta Journal. Nine diverse counties across Georgia were selected—none with a major city—and teams of reporters and producers fanned out to find an interesting story in each location. Stories from all but one county were broadcast in episode 413: "Georgia Rambler" on July 30, 2010. Two other stories took longer to prepare. "Original Recipe" episode 427 aired February 11, 2011, which reprised a Salter column about a handwritten Coca-Cola recipe. The other, "Very Tough Love", took eight months to research and compile.

The episode followed the show's standard format, telling the stories of several people, recording them speaking from their perspective. TAL producer Ira Glass delegated his regular TAL responsibilities for several weeks to personally research the story. He made several trips to Georgia to interview people for supporting testimony, acquired documents, discovered background information and made repeated requests to get Judge Williams to answer many questions raised.

== Content of the show ==
The episode's name is derived from Judge Amanda Williams' comments that she believes in the use of tough love by families dealing with drug problems. The title is used because Williams' actions far exceed the normal standard of tough love, coming closer to Authoritarian parenting, which is often linked to negative outcomes.

The show begins with Glass providing background on the home town of the person he is about to interview at Lee Arrendale State Prison in northeast Georgia.
The story of Lindsey Dills is the primary focus of the episode. She began playing soccer in the youth league, and by high school, she was outstanding. However, she wasn't coping with her parents separating, and began self-mutilating and smoking pot. Her parents got her into treatment programs several times, but it didn't help. She got a job at a restaurant/bar and started hanging out with older employees after work, doing cocaine. She decided to quit soccer before her senior year, and nobody could talk her out of it. Dills commented,

The coaches were calling the house, telling my dad to ‘talk to her.’ And part of it was the drugs, part of it was I'd done it so long. And I wanted to be a teenager. I wanted to do stuff on weekends and I wanted not to have to practice at 5 in the morning and I didn't want to have to run 3 miles every other day.

Her parents divorced, her mother moved away, and she lived with her father. One weekend when her dad was out of town, she forged two checks that totaled $100 from her father's account and used the money to buy drugs.

Upon his return, her CPA father quickly found the discrepancy. Her actions scared him and he desperately wanted to help his daughter before she was beyond help. He began taking her for drug tests, and told her if she failed, he would go to the police with the forged checks. She passed several tests using diluted urine or getting a clean sample from someone else, but she finally tested positive. By now, she had stopped going to school, and her parents decided this might be their last opportunity to intervene. Forgery charges were filed, and Lindsey was arrested. Her parents told her that the charges would be dropped if she agreed to check into an out-of-town drug treatment program, away from her friends. But Lindsey didn't want to leave Brunswick and go somewhere chosen by her parents. The prosecutor suggested another option, drug court.

The first drug court was started during 1989 in Miami-Dade County, Florida to deal with a crack cocaine epidemic. These non-violent offenders committed crimes to support their drug addiction. The new system required court-supervised drug treatment which was cheaper than incarceration and helped people end their addiction and become productive members of society. In 2005, there were 1,262 Drug courts in the United States, but the one in Brunswick was run by Judge Amanda Williams and many locals were afraid of her.

Lindsey Dills explained what happened:

So Jason Clarke is my public defender at the time and he's warning me. He's saying, "Lindsey don't take drug court. I'm telling you, you won't make it." He's told me this like three or four times. I'm adamant. I'm saying, "I'm taking drug court." Because all I know is I get to get out of jail. It's all I know. I don't know anything else about it. So I go to plead into drug court. My dad's in the court room. Judge Barton was on the bench that day instead of Judge Williams. She was gone. My dad's done Judge Barton's accounting for probably the past 15 years and they're very good friends. So (Judge Barton) sees me come in and he pulls me up to the bench and he's like, "Don't do this. Don't take drug court. Are you sure you want to do this?" He asked me three or four times. Judge Barton's trying to talk me out of taking drug court. That I would not do well. I wouldn't make it. He didn't think it was what I should do.

She opted to go to drug court and was released from jail. The average duration in drug court in the United States is 15 months; three years is rare. On Friday of the week after her court appearance, she violated the 9 o'clock curfew and got caught, then failed a drug test. According to the National Association of Drug Court Professionals (NADCP), it is not unusual for most people who enter a drug court program to relapse in the beginning, so it is part of the program.

When Dills went before Judge Williams, the judge screamed at Dills, who began to cry. The judge sentenced her to seven days in jail, which was unusually harsh for a first relapse, even for Judge Williams, whose normal punishment for first relapse is three days; seven days for a second relapse; and 28 days for a third occurrence.

West Huddleston is executive director of the NADCP, the primary support organization for the nation's 2,400+ drug courts and 25,000 counselors, lawyers, and judges. He commented:

Any drug court that relies primarily on jail, or punishment generally, is operating way outside our philosophy and just does not understand addiction. They've (addicts) lost their jobs, their income, they've lost their loved ones. I mean, all of those natural consequences which are much more severe than a day or two or three in jail have not stopped them from using drugs and alcohol. Why would we think putting them in jail would do so?".

Judge Williams had a special sanction for people who relapsed four or more times. She would send them away for "indefinite sentences" and make comments like, "They're going to sit their ass over there till they get a better attitude" or "Take them away; you'll come back when I'm ready for you".

When Dills violated drug court rules, she served jail terms of 51 days, 90 days and 104 days. Dills had been in the drug program for 42 months when she went to court on October 8, 2008. The judge took Dills into chambers with the drug court staff and debated terminating Dills from the program, which would require her to serve 20–24 months in prison for the original forgery charges. Finally, Judge Williams told Dills to do 28 days in jail. After Dills was returned to jail, the judge phoned and ordered Dills to have "no further contact", which meant no visitors, phone calls or mail. She was also placed in an isolation cell. When Dills asked if the isolation was for the full 28 days, the guard told her that the order had been changed to an "indefinite sentence".

Twenty-eight days passed, and Dills was still in solitary confinement. She ran out of the two antidepressants prescribed by the drug court doctor, and the guards weren't permitted to talk to her, so her depression returned, causing her to cry constantly. Thanksgiving passed with no contact, but Dills convinced herself that Judge Williams wouldn't leave her in jail through Christmas. She briefly saw a drug counselor on December 8 who informed her that there would be no drug court until January because Judge Williams was on vacation. Dills lost hope, and when an opportunity presented itself, she tried to commit suicide by slitting her wrists. Her attempt was discovered before she bled out, and her life was saved.

=== Drug policy ===
The drug policy in Glynn County, Georgia was established by Amanda F. Williams, chief judge of the Glynn County Superior Court. She had been on the bench since 1991, and started the drug court in 1998. By almost any standard, the program is draconian. Judges in general have enormous power, and drug court judges wield almost unlimited power because participants are required to waive many of their rights when they choose that option. The sanctions of the judge are viewed as part of "treatment", not the imposition of a sentence. Judge Williams insisted that all defendants have a choice, but the local criminal justice system strongly "encourages" defendants to choose drug court.

In Brunswick, anyone arrested and charged with a non-violent drug crime must appear at the next once-a-week drug court. If the charge is a felony, there is no bail; bail for misdemeanors is $15,000. A former Glynn County Public Defender told Glass that most defendants could not post the hefty bond, so they stay in jail. Judge Williams personally handles all drug cases.

In drug court, there are two choices: plead guilty or go to trial. Judge Williams warns those who choose a trial that if found guilty, they will not receive probation; they will go to prison for a minimum of 20 to 24 months. The only way to get out of jail before trial is to post a minimum $15,000 bond.

Defendants who plead guilty have a choice: immediately begin serving a minimum 10 to 12 months in a probation detention center where inmates are put to work and are ineligible for parole, -or- enter the drug court program and be immediately released on personal recognizance. Given those choices, the vast majority choose drug court.

According to the Georgia Department of Audits and Accounts, 378 individuals participated in the Glynn/Camden drug court in 2009, the largest in the state. The population of Glynn and Camden Counties is approximately 100,000. By contrast, Fulton County, which includes Atlanta, had just 330 participants from a population exceeding one million.

Participants in drug court are required to submit to random and weekly drug tests; observe 9:00pm curfews; participate in five drug court group therapy and individual counseling sessions each week; attend at least four Alcoholics Anonymous or Narcotics Anonymous meetings each week; refrain from imbibing alcoholic beverages; obey all laws; and appear in court periodically.

=== Wrong participants ===
The experiences of Brandi Byrd illustrate another problematic case. Byrd was out with a friend who was charged with DUI. Byrd gave the police permission to search her purse, and two Dextropropoxyphene pills were found. She explained that her mother had given them to her after minor surgery and she had forgotten about them, but she was charged with two felonies, one for each pill. After sitting in jail for six days, Byrd went to court. The public defender and the drug court counselors told her if she didn't agree to drug court, she would go to prison. Judge Williams told her, "There is no such thing as putting you on probation. If you don't beat the rap, there is no street probation for charges in this county, and hasn't been for seven years, since I've had drug court."

Despite the fact that Byrd had no history of drug addiction or abuse and no criminal record, she felt like she had no choice but to agree to drug court supervision or go to prison. Then came the catch-22; she was told she had to admit to drug use and addiction or she couldn't get into the program. West Huddleston, NADCP executive director, described the individuals to whom drug court programs are targeted: "long histories of addiction...multiple treatment failures...multiple times on probation...served previous jail or prison sentences...driven by their addiction".

When people without addiction and past criminal behavior are placed in an intensive treatment program, they tend to rebel and become defiant because the therapy is of no benefit to them and they feel they don't deserve the restrictions placed on their behavior.

=== Success stories ===
The program does have its supporters and success stories. If a participant follows all the rules, they can complete the program and have their convictions purged in 30 months. The situation of Charlie McCullough should have been a complete success story, but it took a detour. McCullough was caught in a police sting buying drugs, and entered drug court voluntarily, determined to kick drugs. Everything went fine for 22 months; he never missed a meeting or appointment and passed all his drug tests. Then at a random urine screening, the lab technician told him he tested positive for methamphetamine. McCullough insisted that he was clean and asked to take another test, which he passed. A third test was administered, which he also passed, so McCullough was relieved. At his next court appearance, Judge Williams asked why he failed a drug test. He was surprised, and stated that he passed the second test. The judge told him she was going to use the first test; the second one didn't count. No matter how much he professed his innocence, the judge didn't believe him. The judge refused to bring in the lab technician to testify, but asked McCullough if he would take a polygraph, which he agreed, then she changed her mind and sentenced him to three days in jail for a "bad" test and 14 days for questioning the results of the drug screening. From that point on, his drug court experience went downhill.

Lawyer Jim Jenkins, who represented clients in the drug court, concurred: "I don't disagree with the people who tell me she means well, but I think the record in too many cases speaks for itself, that a lot of people have had their constitutional and procedural rights run roughshod over."

== Reception ==
The story was well received by listeners, spawning a firestorm of controversy towards Judge Williams, some of which were from other legal professionals, calls for Williams' resignation or impeachment, and death threats against her.

The subject was discussed on dozens of internet sites, and the website, Impeach Judge Williams was set up. A page on Facebook with the title, Judge Amanda Williams Must Be Stopped was created. One person called her a "monster" and stated, "This woman is the reason the rest of the country thinks Georgia is such a backwater."

Criticism of Williams following the show included claims that at times she imposed indefinite stays in jail and other excessively punitive sentences contrary to principles supported by the National Association of Drug Court Professionals. The Association supports the principle that "drug courts are designed to reduce drug use, reduce crime, repair families, hold addicts accountable and restore them to meaningful roles in society."

The NADCP Board of Directors issued a statement in response to the disturbing events reported in the program. They reiterated the contention made by Ira Glass that the Glynn County Drug Court is "run differently than any other Drug Court in the Country". They further stated that 6% of U.S. Drug Courts "have watered down or dropped core ingredients of the Drug Court model, or apply inappropriate practices in contraindication to accepted teachings in the field. And they have paid dearly for it in terms of lower cost savings, lower graduation rates, higher recidivism rates, and a reputation for unfairness and ineffectiveness".

Judge Williams defended her approach explaining, "there's some addiction in my family. My husband has been in recovery for over 15 years. And about the time I started looking to start a drug court around 1996, he had gotten into recovery. So we’ve lived it as a family. Because all the family members are touched by it."

After the story aired, Williams hired David G. Oedel, a law professor at Mercer University, who published an open letter to This American Life executive producer Ira Glass, claiming that the story was "riddled with falsehoods," and "libel masquerading as journalism."

On April 12, 2011, Glass made a note on the TAL blog that a clarification and a correction had been made to the story on the web. The correction concerned the reason for Kim Spead's 12 months of incarceration after completing the program. After reviewing court documents, Glass concluded that it was for violating the terms and conditions of the Drug Court sentence and contract, and not for failing to pay the $1,500 program costs assessed to drug court participants.

The clarification was made because there is sometimes a legal recourse when the judge imposes a sanction, but only in specialized circumstances.

However, Glass stood by the story's details, especially his characterization of defendants receiving inappropriately harsh treatment in Williams' courtroom.

In response to Oedel's threat to sue TAL for defamation, the show's lawyers defended Glass and the story, asserting that Williams' conduct "is certainly a matter of keen public interest".

== Ethics probe ==
On November 9, 2011, the Georgia Judicial Qualifications Commission (JQC) filed a 14-count ethics complaint against Williams, alleging she had incarcerated defendants indefinitely, made false statements, and engaged in nepotism and "tyrannical partiality". The JQC appointed Leah Ward Sears, a former Georgia Supreme Court Chief Justice who left the court in 2009, to prosecute the ethics charges. A hearing was scheduled to be held in 2012 to determine whether and how Williams should be disciplined. On November 16, 2011, one of the five Superior Court judges in Williams' circuit district stated Judge Williams had stepped down from her drug court position and would stop hearing criminal cases until the investigation has been completed. Williams continued to work on civil cases previously assigned to her but did not accept new case assignments.

=== Resignation ===
Judge Williams sent a letter to Georgia Governor Nathan Deal in mid-December 2011, indicating her intention to step down from the bench effective January 2, 2012. The JQC agreed to drop charges after Williams tendered her resignation. She also signed a consent order prohibiting her from seeking judicial office, effective immediately. Georgia Attorney General Sam Olens appointed a special prosecutor to determine if Williams should face felony criminal charges for allegedly lying to JQC investigators. A conviction would result in forfeiture of an annual $74,000 state pension and disbarment.

== Award ==
In February 2012, Long Island University announced that "Very Tough Love" won a 2011 George Polk Award for Radio Reporting.

== Closure ==
On February 22, 2012, the woman whose case prompted Glass to investigate and broadcast the "Very Tough Love" episode was released from probation by Glynn County Magistrate Timothy Barton, who replaced Williams. He also purged two forgery convictions from Lindsey Dill's record as per the Georgia conditional discharge statute. When asked to comment, Barton stated, "I thought seven years was long enough."
