= Allan Bridge =

American conceptual artist (1945–1995)

Allan Bridge's flyer which he posted around Manhattan in 1980.

Allan Bridge (February 14, 1945 – August 5, 1995) was an American conceptual artist best known for his creation in 1980 of the confessional phone system known as the Apology Line. He went by the pseudonym Mr. Apology (a label which has since been adopted by an advice columnist) and used new technology of the time, an answering machine, to record confessions from anonymous callers.

== Life and career ==
Born in Falls Church, Virginia, Bridge attended the University of Chicago, where he earned a bachelor's degree in fine arts. Returning to the Washington, D.C. area, he became one of the second generation of artists of the Washington Color School movement.

For a series of large-scale paintings, he used poured paint techniques and then moved on to geometric abstraction. He was championed and collected by Gene Baro, at one time the director of the Corcoran Gallery of Art. Bridge exhibited at the Corcoran and many other galleries in the 1970s. He created at least 79 paintings in the years spanning 1970 to 1977. Bridge married Elinor Schiele in 1977, and they divorced in 1981.

Eventually, Bridge tired of the visual image and began making interactive machines with moral implications. The most famous best known of these is Crime Time, where the viewer spins a wheel of chance and either gets away with a "crime" by receiving a marble from the machine, or she gets "caught" and her hand is held in a lock for 30 seconds. From Crime Time, the next jump for his restless mind was the Apology Line, created after he moved to Manhattan in 1977.

Bridge sold rights for a film and novel. Mr. Apology by Campbell Black was published by Ballantine Books in 1984, and this was adapted by screenwriter Mark Medoff for the HBO thriller, Apology (1986). The film switched the sex of the conceptual artist from male to female (portrayed by Lesley Ann Warren).

In 1993, Bridge was the subject of a long article, "The Confession," by Alec Wilkinson, published in the October 4, 1993, issue of The New Yorker. Wilkinson's article was reprinted a decade later in Mr. Apology and Other Essays (Houghton Mifflin, 2003). He died on August 5, 1995.

== Confessions ==
Some confessions taped from the Apology phone calls were published in Apology, a magazine edited and published by Bridge. The last issue was published January 1996. After investigating the notion of bringing the Apology Project to the online service GEnie, he was working on a book about the Apology Line and making plans in 1995 to expand the Apology confessions to the Internet.

In 1989, his second wife, Marissa Bridge, founded Marissa Bridge Studios, which became one of New York's leading decorative painting and restoration companies, with offices in Manhattan and the Hamptons. Active in boating and scuba diving, Bridge was diving in August 1995, when he was killed by a hit-and-run jet skier. Lydia Nibley wrote about this in her essay "All Apologies" (December 16, 2004):

This message was left anonymously on a phone-message service called the Apology Line, where people recorded their confessions and also listened to others admit to acts of intentional cruelty, silly screw-ups, unfortunate and unintentional mistakes and, on occasion, even murder. From 1980 to 1995, Allan Bridge ran the line as something of a secular priest, offering the potential for forgiveness through the catharsis of taped confession—until the day he was killed by a Jet-Skier who fled the scene and was never identified.

Allan's wife, Marissa, was convinced that had her husband lived, he would have forgiven the person who hit him. But does that Jet-Skier—who was seen circling back to confirm that it wasn't driftwood, but a man in scuba gear he had hit—live the rest of his life plagued by remorse and guilt? And would confessing to someone, anyone, even anonymously, make a difference?...

When asked if she is sure Allan would have been able to forgive the Jet-Skier who hit him—even without an apology—Marissa Bridge imagines several scenarios. "The person knew it was an accident and that it wasn't his fault," she says. "He couldn't have predicted a scuba diver would surface at that moment right in front of him. Maybe the person was really young and gave into the impulse to run away rather than to stay and face things. I'm sure whoever they are, they are sorry."

She explains that listening to Allan's collection of tapes from the Apology Line helps her understand that the average person is in some level of pain about past actions, and that people who have bigger regrets have a larger burden to carry. "Allan was a petty criminal in his early life, and he worried that people could fall too easily into being either the predator or the prey. He lived his life to say, 'Let's see if we can be better people.'"

Several passages about Bridge and jet skis are scattered throughout The Unwanted Sound of Everything We Want: A Book About Noise by Garret Keizer.

== Play ==
Apology, a new theatrical piece based on the life and work of Allan Bridge, is being developed by Greg Pierotti, co-writer of The Laramie Project.

== Exhibitions ==
A bank of phone booths were installed for Bridge's 1981 show at the New Museum, enabling guests to pick up the phones and listen directly to the original Apology Line tapes.

== Awards ==
The film Apology won the Audience Award at the 1987 Cognac Festival du Film Policier, and that same year it won a CableACE Award for Maurice Jarre's music score.

== Listen to ==
- This American Life, "Apology" (November 5, 2004)
- The Apology Line, Wondery podcast, 2021
- Mr. Apology, Criminal podcast, 2024
