= Apology Project =

Conceptual art project (1980–1995)

The Apology Project, a 1980 conceptual art project, was created by Allan Bridge who employed the pseudonym Mr. Apology. Bridge invited callers to "apologize their wrongs against people without jeopardizing themselves" and promoted the service by sticking up posters in the Tribeca area of New York.

== Concept ==
The line was based at Allan Bridge's Manhattan loft and used an answering machine to record confessions from anonymous callers. Over the 15 years that the line was in operation, more than 1,000 hours of confession were recorded, with callers confessing everything from infidelity, shop lifting, drug dealing to ritualistic murder. Some of the confessions were published in Bridge's magazine Apology.

The project came to an abrupt end in 1995 when Bridge was struck and killed by a jet skier while diving in the heavily trafficked Shinnecock Inlet on Long Island. The incident was witnessed by two people on the shoreline, however the culprit was never found.

== Legacy ==
In 2019, Mark Thomas of The Payphone Project acquired the former telephone number for the Apology Line, 212-255-2748, where it is now the official phone number. The calls are routed to the Payphone Radio stream.

== Media ==
=== Mr. Apology (novel) ===
Bridge sold the rights for the idea, inspiring the novel. Mr. Apology by Campbell Black, which was published by Ballantine Books in 1984. This was and this was adapted by screenwriter for the HBO thriller, Apology (1986).

=== Apology (film) ===
Screenwriter Mark Medoff used the original concept and the novel Mr. Apology to create a film version for HBO called Apology. The film starred Lesley Ann Warren, Peter Weller and John Glover. It won the Audience Award at the 1987 Cognac Festival du Film Policier, and that same year it won a CableACE Award for Maurice Jarre's music score.

In the Apology Line podcast, his wife Marissa Bridge recalled how Bridge took very little interest in the movie project and used it as a means to make money to keep the project going and received considerable criticism from listeners for "selling out".

=== The Apology Line (podcast) ===
Bridge's widow, artist Marissa Bridge, turned her perspective of the Apology Project into a podcast, which was first aired in January 2021. She hosted the six-episode series on podcast platform Wondery including:

- Episode 1 – Introducing: The Apology Line
- Episode 2 – Who's Sorry Now?
- Episode 3 – Going Public
- Episode 4 – Your Dungeon or Mine?
- Episode 5 – To Catch a Serial Killer
- Episode 6 – Mrs. Apology
- Episode 7 – Strawberry Fields Forever
- Episode 8 – And The Calls Live On
- Episode 9 – What To Listen to Next: Against the Odds

=== Apology (play) ===
Apology, a new theatrical piece based on the life and work of Allan Bridge, is being developed by Greg Pierotti, co-writer of The Laramie Project.

== See also ==
- grouphug.us
- grouphelp.org
