= Apology (film) =

1986 television film directed by Robert Bierman

- VHS cover
- Genre: Thriller
- Screenplay by: Mark Medoff
- Story by: Mark Medoff; Campbell Black
- Directed by: Robert Bierman
- Starring: Lesley Ann Warren; Peter Weller; Chris Noth; John Glover; Charles S. Dutton; Harvey Fierstein
- Music by: Maurice Jarre (score); Bill Champlin (songs)
- Countries of origin: United States; Canada
- Original language: English

Production
- Executive producers: Roger Gimbel; Neil Rosenstein
- Producers: Les Alexander; Richard Parks; Richard Smith
- Production location: Toronto
- Cinematography: Phil Meheux
- Editor: Jim Benson
- Running time: 93 minutes
- Production company: HBO Pictures

Original release
- Network: HBO
- Release: July 27, 1986

Apology is a made for HBO original film that premiered on July 27, 1986. The movie is based on the artwork of Allan Bridge and the novel he inspired, Mr. Apology. The film was eventually released on video and syndicated to cable and network television outlets. It stars Lesley Ann Warren, Peter Weller and John Glover. The film was titled in some markets as Apology for Murder. It was the first film produced under the HBO Pictures banner.

== Background ==
Producers Les Alexander, Richard Park, and Richard Smith developed the idea from a similarly themed art project in New York. They hired Mark Medoff, who had won a Tony Award for his play Children of a Lesser God, to write the script. Filming was done in New York's SoHo district and Greenwich Village, with additional shooting in Toronto.

Executive producer Roger Gimbel cast Warren in the lead role based on their prior working relationship in Betrayal (1978). The part of Lily in Apology was Warren's first role in a thriller film.

== Plot ==
In New York City, avant garde sculptor Lily McGuire (Lesley Ann Warren) lives a complicated and frustrating life as she tries to not only provide for herself and her daughter, but debut her latest artwork known as Apology. The design is a two-part exhibit consisting of a walkthrough sculpture of advanced mechanical design and a phone service that allows callers to anonymously leave confessions of whatever they desire on the answering machine. However, someone has been calling the line and using it to announce a string of recent high-profile killings. After contacting the police, Detective Hungate (Peter Weller) advises Lily to take the threats seriously. Eventually, the serial killer stops his phone calls and intends to murder Lily to the sounds of the exhibit's programmed confessions. Charles S. Dutton, Harvey Fierstein, and Chris Noth co-star.

== Cast ==
- Lesley Ann Warren as Lily
- Peter Weller as Rad Hungate
- George Loros as Frank
- John Glover as Philip
- Jimmie Ray Weeks as Claude
- Harvey Fierstein as The Derelict
- Charles Dutton as Assistant District Attorney
- Skye Bassett as Anna
- Garrett M. Brown as Gordon
- Ellen Barber as Patty Garretson
- Reathel Bean as Lieutenant Arnold Goodson
- Chris Noth as Roy Burnette
- Diana Reis as Jean
- Joe Zaloom as Street Vendor

== Home media ==
The film was released on VHS by HBO/Cannon Video under license from Home Box Office. However, it never released on DVD or Blu-ray.

== Critical reception ==
The film was considered notably violent for cable television of the day: one critic wrote "there's lots of gore... the screen is littered with bodies and the sound track is filled with obscenities". Despite the caveats, the same critic added: "It's good enough to hook you though. Once you start watching you stick around to find out what happens." In the Chicago Tribune, a reviewer wrote that although the story "alternates between the suspenseful and the silly", it remains "intriguing because of its quirky premise". Gannett News Service reviewer Mike Hughes sighed that the plot relied on "absurdities and coincidences", but offered praise for Warren's expressive acting and Bierman's mood-setting direction.

Syndicated columnist Judy Flander called it "a stylish thriller" and "a great watch", chiefly because of Warren who "glows" in her role. Critic Tom Shales, however, heaped scorn on the film for its "miserably nasty" and "pointlessly perverse" storyline, describing it as all "foul language, violence and miscellaneous kinks".
