= Marissa Bridge =

American artist

Marissa Bridge is an American artist. She studied painting at the Parsons School of Design in New York City.

Marissa Bridge was the second wife of artist Allan Bridge, creator of The Apology Line conceptual art project. They met in New York in 1981 and married in 1984, remaining married until Allan was killed in a hit-and-run collision while scuba-diving in 1995. Marissa and Allan shared their love of scuba-diving which inspired Marissa to paint seascapes. After Allan's death Marissa moved on to other themes for her artwork, focusing on commissioned pieces.

== Artwork ==
The focus of her work over the past decade has been nature, with a particular interest in flower imagery and her work on flowers have developed from a series of 36 paintings named “The Journey” to the more recent mixed media studies.

Her fascination with flowers evolved from her earlier nature-based studies of seascapes and the landscapes of her home in Long Island. A gift of a potted cyclamen from her sister prompted her to draw flowers and this was said to have been the beginning of her devotion to flowers.

She is a member of the American Society of Botanical Artists.

Marissa strongly believes in using gut instinct when choosing which flowers to paint, as a friend once told her that the gut is the ‘second brain’. The flower selections are deeply personal and many of them originate from her garden at home. She also purchases flowers from a local flower market in Manhattan, where she has had a home for nearly 20 years.

Her mixed media floral artwork entitled ‘Flower for Detained Children’ highlighted the plight suffered by children in detention centers in Texas who had been separated from their parents and families. Her share of the proceeds were donated to the Women's Refugee Commission.

=== Orchid Series: Silent Journey (2012-2015) ===
The 'Silent Journey' series includes 36 paintings which study the life-cycle of a Phalaenopsis orchid. The individual paintings are all painted in oil paint on a variety of background materials including board, canvas and Wallis paper.

The collection begins with muted tones and visible brushstrokes, with the colors later giving life to the blooms that emerge. At this point, the style that the artist adopts changes and individual brushstrokes become less visible. The last painting returns to a limited color palette to bring the bloom's lifecycle to an end.

Orchid Series: Silent Journey was exhibited at Dodds & Eder Home in Sag Harbor in 2015.

=== Daylilies (2015-2016) ===
Daylilies are a collection of oil on canvas paintings in the realism style. The floral subjects are presented in vibrant colors which contrast with the stark dark blue backgrounds.

=== Flowers in Overall Patterns and Mummers (2015-2019) ===
The collection uses different paint mediums to explore the color and form of a variety of flowers.

=== Centers (2016-2018) ===
The artist focuses her fascination with flower centers to study the detail and color of a number of flower varieties.

=== White Paper Mixed Media (2017-2019) ===
The White Paper Mixed Media collection is a series of 3-D work that developed from Marissa's ‘Centers’ idea. Marissa started working on the series in 2017 and experimented with a wide range of materials including folded and curled archival-quality recycled paper, q-tips, wire, plaster, gesso, seeds and pins. The work is deliberately void of colour to allow the flower form to modify into an abstract aesthetic.

=== Multi-Color Mixed Media (2017-2019) ===
The Multi-Color Mixed Media collection is another 3-D collection like the White Paper Mixed Media collection, but is more experimental in terms of both the use of color and in the depth of the flower forms.

=== ‘Phula’ for Elephant Family charity ===
Marissa handpainted an elephant statue named ‘Phula’ which was subsequently auctioned to raise money for the Elephant Family charity in India. In June 2018 the collection of decorated elephant statues were displayed at various places around London before the auction.

== Exhibitions ==
- 30 September - 21 November 2020 - Artists for Social Justice 2020 (Online exhibition) at the ARC Gallery, Chicago.
- 15 June 2019 - Summer Time Bliss at The Jamie Forbes Gallery with the Ketcham Inn Foundation.
- 30 March 2019 - Slide Slam at The Haven Gallery, Northport, NY.
- 12 January - 10 February 2019 at the White Room Gallery in Bridgehampton, NY.
- 29 September 2018 - Westhampton Free Library Annual Studio Tour.
- 28 September 2018 - Rock For Our Rights Benefit Auction for Planned Parenthood Hudson.
- 18 August - 12 September 2018 - Late Summer Visions at The Jamie Forbes Gallery.
- June 2018 - ‘Phula’ the painted elephant was displayed in Brown Hart Gardens, London.
- 12 May 2018 - Solely Women at the William Ris Gallery in Jamesport, NY.
- 13 - 29 April 2018 - Elements of Surprise at the White Room Gallery, Bridgehampton, NY.
- 9 January - 7 February 2016 - A Bridge in Conversation at Kathryn Markel Fine Arts, Bridgehampton, NY.

== The Apology Project ==
Allan Bridge was already involved in the Apology Line when he and Marissa met and so the project was present in their relationship from the beginning to the end. In the Apology Line podcast, she said that at times it made the relationship difficult, particularly when Allan would become heavily involved in some of the more unusual callers and those who he felt compelled to help.

Marissa turned her perspective of the Apology Project into a podcast, which was first aired in January 2021.
