= Chana Joffe-Walt =

American radio journalist and producer

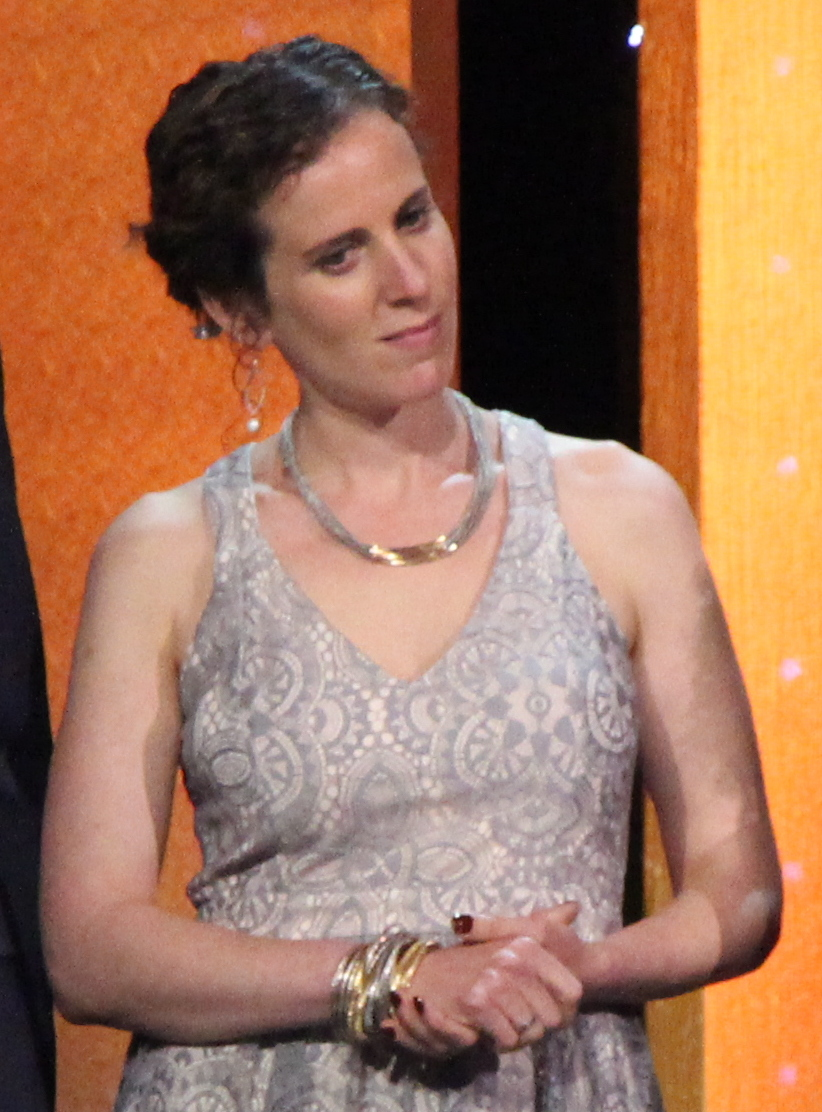
- Joffe-Walt at the Peabody Awards in 2016
- Education: Oberlin College
- Occupation: Radio producer
- Employer: This American Life
- Awards: 2016 Peabody Award winner, 2023 Dupont Award winner

Chana Joffe-Walt is a radio journalist and producer. She has worked for Planet Money and This American Life.

== Early life ==
Joffe-Walt's parents, Brian Walt and activist Zara Joffe, are South African. She graduated from Oberlin College in 2003.

== Career ==
Joffe-Walt began her radio career volunteering for a community radio station outside Seattle, KBCS. She was later a reporter for the Seattle radio station KPLU and a freelancer for NPR before being recruited to work for Planet Money. She then became a producer for This American Life.

In 2020, the New York Times published Nice White Parents, a five-part podcast reported by Joffe-Walt.

=== Awards ===
Joffe-Walt has twice been awarded a Peabody Award. The first was awarded in 2015 along with Nikole Hannah-Jones and Ira Glass for an episode of This American Life on school segregation and education. The second was awarded in 2024 for a This American Life episode focusing on the everyday struggles of normal people during the height of the Gaza conflict that year.
