= Dishwasher (occupation) =

Person who cleans dishware and cookware

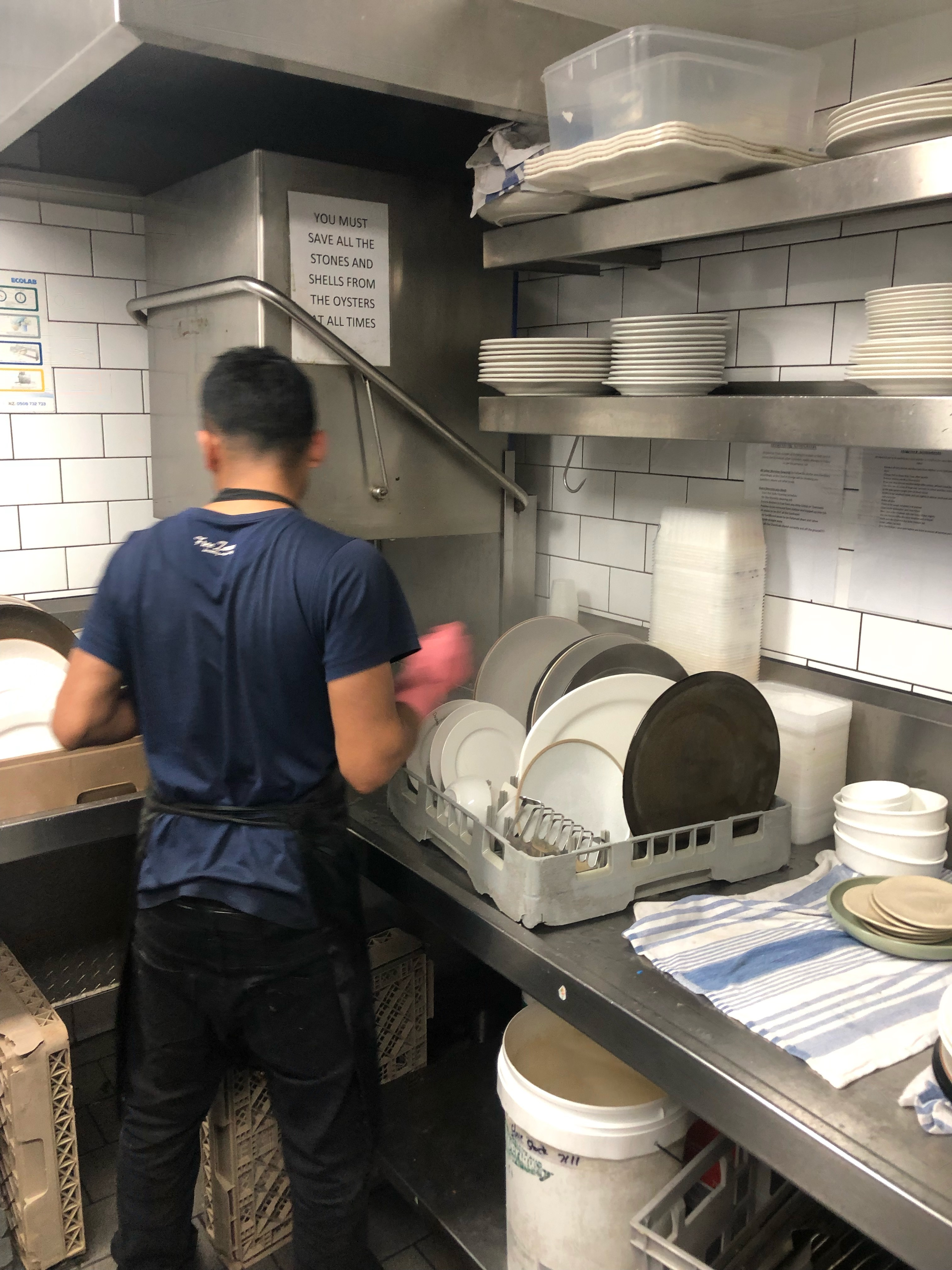
A professional dishwasher at work

A dishwasher is a person who washes and dries dishware, cookware, and cutlery, often in a "back of house" restaurant or institutional setting. In the United Kingdom, this role is also referred to as kitchen porter, as well as "dishie" or "dish pig" in Australia. In many cases, the role will often include additional cleaning and light food preparation duties.

== Duties and functions ==
Most professional dishwashers work in a restaurant or institutional setting.

The dishwasher in a commercial kitchen is frequently an entry-level job that can lead to a career in food preparation.

A 2008 study by the Pew Hispanic Center reported that many illegal immigrants to the United States worked as dishwashers.

== See also ==
- Dishwasher Pete – A writer who supported himself for more than a decade while attempting to work as a dishwasher in all 50 US states
