= Sarah Abdurrahman =

American journalist

- Education: University of Texas at Austin
- Occupation: radio producer

Sarah Abdurrahman is an American journalist. She is the managing editor of This American Life. Previously, she was the Senior Producer for The Nod. She also worked as a senior producer for Gimlet Media where she launched and ran several shows.

== Early life ==
Abdurrahman is of Libyan heritage.

In college, Abdurrahman studied radio, television, and film with plans to become a filmmaker. However, as her interest in photography grew, she got her master's degree in media studies at the University of Texas at Austin.

== Career ==
After graduation, Abdurrahman briefly found employment as a photographer. She was a producer with WNYC's On the Media before becoming the senior producer of The Nod from Gimlet Media. She was announced as the new managing editor of This American Life on March 18, 2020.

== Personal life ==
Abdurrahman is Muslim.

My Detainment Story

That was one of the hardest things, when we were done with our detainment. I really just felt so stupid, like how naïve was I to think that when we came back into the country, all smiles and happy to be home, that this wouldn't happen? You know, you always hear this over and over and over again: You don't do anything wrong, you’ve got nothing to hide, you’re fine. And I really thought if there's due process, if there’s a legal system and I haven't done anything wrong, then nobody will treat me that way, and if somebody does treat me that way, there’s gonna be some sort of accountability later, for that.

— Sarah Abdurrahman, On the Media (Sept. 2013)

On September 20, 2013, WNYC Studios released an interview with Abdurrahman titled "My Detainment Story or: How I Learned to Stop Feeling Safe in My Own Country and Hate Border Agents*" after she and her family (all US citizens) were detained upon reentry after a trip to Canada. She recounted the difficulty in getting answers about her detainment. In 2014, she a won Front Page award for best Feature in Radio for the piece.

== Awards ==
- 2014 Gracie for Outstanding Reporter/Correspondent, for her work on WNYC's On the Media Radio
- 2014 Front Page award for In-Depth Reporting for the "Environmental Nightmare" series
