= Nice White Parents =

Podcast by Serial Productions

- Genre: Investigative journalism; Serialized audio narrative
- Language: English

Cast and voices
- Hosted by: Chana Joffe-Walt

Music
- Theme music composed by: The Bad Plus

Production
- Production: Julie Snyder
- Editing: Sarah Koenig; Neil Drumming; Ira Glass
- Length: 4h 20m

Technical specifications
- Audio format: Podcast (via streaming or downloadable MP3)

Publication
- No. of seasons: 1
- No. of episodes: 5
- Original release: July 23 – July 23, 2020

Related
- Website: Link to NYT Podcast

Nice White Parents is a podcast produced by Serial Productions and The New York Times and hosted by Chana Joffe-Walt.

== Background ==
The podcast is produced by Serial Productions and The New York Times. The podcast is hosted by Chana Joffe-Walt. The five episode podcast debuted on July 30, 2020 and ended on August 20, 2020. The podcast discusses how progressive white parents can have a negative impact on the integration of schools. The series chose to focus on progressive schools in the northeast because they are some of the most segregated schools in the United States. The first episode discusses a fund raising party for a dual-language French program for a Brooklyn public school and contrasts the economic class of the party attendees and the students. The podcast focuses on the Boerum School of International Studies in Brooklyn. The podcast discusses the school districts history going back to the 1960s. In the final episode of the series Joffe-Walt discusses how the COVID-19 pandemic has affected education. It was reported in 2020 that Issa Rae is going to produce a comedy series based on the podcast. The show was criticised by Fox News.
