= Stories of Hope and Fear =

Compilation album by This American Life
- Released: November 7, 2006
- Recorded: 2003–2006
- Genre: Talk radio
- Length: 145:50
- Language: English
- Label: Chicago Public Radio

This American Life chronology
Crimebusters + Crossed Wires: Stories from This American Life (2003)	Stories of Hope and Fear (2006)

Professional ratings
Review scores
Source	Rating
Allmusic	link

Stories of Hope and Fear is the fourth compilation album featuring radio broadcasts from This American Life.

== Track listing ==
Hope

1. Jorge Just – If I Can Make It There – 7:10
2. Jonathan Goldstein and Starlee Kine – Is This Thing On? – 11:43
3. David Wilcox – Thinking Inside the Box – 9:34
4. Alex Blumberg and Griffin Hansbury – Infinite Gent – 14:42
5. Sascha Rothchild – Miami Vices – 7:49
6. Carol Bove and Myron Jones – The Babysitters – 25:23

Fear

7. Tom Wright – Fears of Your Life – 9:12
8. Julie Snyder – On Hold No One Can Hear You Scream: An Interview with Julie Snyder – 22:06
9. Nancy Updike – Anti-Oedipus – 20:57
10. David Sedaris – So a Chipmunk and a Squirrel Walk into a Bar – 7:52
11. John Hodgman – Slingshot – 9:22

== See also ==
- This American Life: Hand It Over -- Stories from Our First Year on the Air
- Lies, Sissies, and Fiascoes: The Best of This American Life
- Crimebusters + Crossed Wires: Stories from This American Life
