= Dishwasher Pete =

Pen name of author Pete Jordan

Dishwasher Pete is the pen name for Pete Jordan, author of the popular Dishwasher zine as well as the book of the same title, whose goal was to wash dishes in every state in America. For more than a decade, he moved from city to city, state to state, washing dishes in restaurants, hospitals, cafeterias, ski resorts, camps, communes, a fish cannery, an offshore oil rig, a dinner train and just about anywhere where dishes were dirty. He was once invited to appear on the Late Show with David Letterman. He did not wish to be on national television, and so a friend of his took his place on the show, pretending to be him. Later, while promoting his book, Pete himself appeared on Letterman and the two discussed the earlier "appearance."

The fifteen issues of the Dishwasher zine are now out of print. Memoirs of Jordan's dishwashing years were published in the book Dishwasher: One Man's Quest to Wash Dishes in All 50 States by Harper Perennial in 2007; it was positively reviewed in Chicagoist. Without reading it, New York Times writer Dwight Garner initially dismissed the book; upon chiding by readers of his column, he wrote "Boy, was I wrong about it - it's exceedingly well-written and explores an American subculture, one Jordan has been working in for more than a decade, with real tact and feeling and humor."

Dishwasher Pete has contributed to five episodes of the radio program This American Life. His writing has also appeared on the Open Letters website.

Dishwasher Pete also volunteered as a "human guinea pig" in first-in-man drug trials, and contributed articles to the Guinea Pig Zero: A Journal for Human Research Subjects zine.

In 2002 Pete moved to Amsterdam, where he became fascinated by the culture and history of this city of cyclists. This is the basis for his second book: In the City of Bikes: The Story of the Amsterdam Cyclist (Harper Perennial, 2013).

== Quotes ==
- "Just keep washing." ― Bob Dole, in response to Dishwasher Pete asking his advice for the dishwashers of America, at a restaurateur convention.
