= National Association of Drug Court Professionals =

American non-profit organization

All Rise
- Formation: 1994
- Type: Nonprofit organization
- Legal status: 501(c)3
- Purpose: All Rise is the training, membership, and advocacy organization for justice system innovation addressing substance use and mental health at every intercept point.
- Headquarters: Alexandria, Virginia, United States
- CEO: Carson Fox
- Website: allrise.org

The National Association of Drug Court Professionals (NADCP) is the former name of All Rise, an American 501(c)(3) non-profit organization devoted to furthering the treatment court model and criminal justice reform worldwide. In 2023, NADCP announced it was rebranding to All Rise.

== About ==
All Rise is the leading training, membership, and advocacy organization for advancing justice system responses to individuals with substance use and mental health disorders. All Rise impacts every stage of the justice system, from first contact with law enforcement to corrections and reentry, and works with public health leaders to improve treatment outcomes for justice-involved individuals. Through its four divisions—the Treatment Court Institute, Impaired Driving Solutions, Justice for Vets, and the Center for Advancing Justice—All Rise provides training and technical assistance at the local and national level, advocates for federal and state funding, and collaborates with public and private entities. All Rise works in every U.S. state and territory and in countries throughout the world.

All Rise was founded in 1994 as the National Association of Drug Court Professionals (NADCP). The organization focuses on treatment courts and related justice system initiatives that address substance use and mental health disorders. It promotes the use of evidence-based treatment combined with judicial oversight and accountability as an approach within the criminal justice system. All Rise has trained over 800,000 public health and public safety professionals, through more than 4,000 treatment courts in the U.S., serving more than 1.5 million people access treatment.

== Divisions ==
All Rise operates its training and technical support services through four divisions:

The Treatment Court Institute provides training, technical assistance, and research resources to treatment court programs in the United States.

Impaired Driving Solutions focuses on initiatives and programs aimed at reducing impaired driving through prevention and justice system strategies.

Justice for Vets works to support veterans treatment courts and promotes approaches for identifying, assessing, and addressing veterans’ needs within the justice system.

The Center for Advancing Justice supports the development and evaluation of justice system innovations related to substance use, mental health, and recovery.

== Adult Treatment Court Best Practice Standards ==
In 2013 and 2015, NADCP released volumes I and II of the Adult Drug Court Best Practice Standards. These resources combine 25 years of empirical study on addiction, pharmacology, behavioral health, and criminal justice.

In 2023, All Rise released the second edition of the standards, now named Adult Treatment Court Best Practice Standards. The second edition incorporates best practices discerned over the past decade in a range of adult treatment court models, addresses frequently asked questions from the field, builds on the experiences and observations of All Rise faculty and audiences, and provides in-depth commentary and practical tips to help programs implement best practices in their day-to-day operations. Importantly, no provision from the first edition of the standards has been retracted or found to be erroneous in subsequent studies.

The Adult Treatment Court Best Practice Standards:

1. Target Population
2. Equity and Inclusion
3. Roles and Responsibilities of the Judge
4. Incentives, Sanctions and Service Adjustments
5. Substance Use, Mental Health, and Trauma Treatment and Recovery Management
6. Complementary Services and Recovery Capital
7. Drug Testing
8. Multidisciplinary Team
9. Participant Performance Monitoring
10. Program Monitoring and Evaluation

== RISE Conference ==
All Rise annually convenes on the intersection of substance use, mental health, and justice reform. RISE23 was attended by over 6,000 justice and treatment professionals.

== Controversy ==
While Karen Freeman-Wilson was CEO of NADCP she helped get a trial of Gabasync (Prometa), a combination of flumazenil, hydroxyzine, and the psychoactive drug gabapentin, promoted as treatment for methamphetamine addiction, launched in the Gary, Indiana drug court despite not having clinical trials or FDA approval. She then took a job offer to be on the board of directors at Hythiam, the company marketing Prometa that was owned by convicted fraudster Terren Peizer. Hythiam charged up to $15,000 for treatment that was split between Hythiam and physicians. Clinical trials funded by Hythiam and performed by the UCLA found Gabasync to be ineffective for the treatment of addictions.
