= Campbell Armstrong =

Scottish author (1914–2013)

- Born: 25 February 1944; Glasgow, Scotland
- Died: 1 March 2013 (aged 69); Dublin, Ireland
- Occupation: Novelist
- Writing career
- Genre: Political intrigue
- Notable works: Jig, Concert of Ghosts, Agents of Darkness, All That Really Matters, Mambo, Deaths' Head, Assassins & Victims
- Website: campbellarmstrong.com/index.php

Campbell Armstrong (25 February 1944 – 1 March 2013), born Thomas Campbell Black, was a Scottish author who graduated with a degree in philosophy from the University of Sussex, England. He taught creative writing from 1971 to 1974 at the State University of New York at Oswego; from 1975 to 1978 he taught at Arizona State University. He worked for some years as a fiction editor with various London publishing houses. After living for many years in England and the United States, he moved to Shannon Harbour, Ireland. He died on 1 March 2013.

His novels Assassins & Victims and The Punctual Rape won Scottish Arts Council Awards. The Last Darkness and White Rage were nominated for the Prix du Polar. His quartet of Glasgow novels consists of The Bad Fire, The Last Darkness, White Rage, and Butcher. He also wrote a memoir titled All That Really Matters, retitled in the United States as I Hope You Have a Good Life.

Under his real name, "Campbell Black"—and under the pseudonym "Thomas Altman"—he wrote novelizations of movies including Raiders of the Lost Ark and Dressed to Kill, as well as thrillers and horror novels. He co-wrote the 1980 novel The Homing with Jeffrey Caine, under the pseudonym "Jeffrey Campbell."

His work was originally influenced by Robert Louis Stevenson, and he ascribed a certain "dark aspect" of his writing to the opening scenes of Treasure Island. Among other influences he included Franz Kafka, Fred Vargas, Kobo Abe, and Albert Camus.

His books have been translated into French, German, Greek, Japanese, Italian, Hebrew and Polish.

== Bibliography ==
1. The Wanting (1966)*
2. Assassins & Victims (1969)*
3. The Punctual Rape (1970)*
4. Death's Head (1971)*
5. Brainfire (1977)
6. Letters from the Dead (1980)*
7. Dressed to Kill (Novelization) (1980)*
8. Raiders of the Lost Ark (Novelization) (1981)
9. Black Christmas (1983)**
10. Mr. Apology (1984)*
11. The Piper (1986)*
12. Jig (1987)
13. Mazurka (1988)
14. Mambo (1989)
15. Agents of Darkness (1991)
16. Asterisk (1992)
17. Concert of Ghosts (1992)
18. Jigsaw (1994)
19. Heat (1996)
20. Blackout (1996)
21. Silencer (1997)
22. Deadline (2000)

[*]= as "Campbell Black"

[**]= as "Thomas Altman"

=== The Glasgow Novels ===
1. Bad Fire (2002)
2. The Last Darkness (2003)
3. White Rage (2004)
4. Butcher (2006)

=== Memoir ===
1. I Hope You Have a Good Life (UK title: All That Really Matters) (2000)

=== Plays ===
1. Death’s Head (BBC-TV) (1968)
2. And They Used to Star in Movies (Peacock, Dublin: Travers, Edinburgh; Body Politic, Chicago. Soho Poly, London) (1970)
3. The Trial of Mr. Punch on Charges of Cruelty (2008)
4. Whispering (radio play broadcast by the BBC in 2008)
