= This American Life =

American radio program and podcast

- Other names: Your Radio Playhouse
- Genre: Radio short stories and essays
- Running time: c. 60 minutes
- Country of origin: United States
- Language: English
- Home station: WBEZ
- Syndicates: Public Radio Exchange, CBC Radio One (Canada), ABC Radio National (Australia)
- TV adaptations: This American Life
- Hosted by: Ira Glass
- Created by: Ira Glass; Torey Malatia
- Produced by: Bim Adewunmi; Elna Baker; Diane Wu; Dana Chivvis; Sean Cole; Aviva DeKornfeld; Lilly Sullivan; Zoe Chace; Chana Joffe-Walt; David Kestenbaum; Miki Meek; Nadia Reiman; Alissa Shipp; Lina Misitzis; Brian Reed; Nancy Updike
- Executive producer: Ira Glass
- Edited by: Sarah Abdurrahman; Susan Burton; Ben Calhoun; Tobin Low; Laura Starecheski; Robyn Semien; Nancy Updike; Diane Wu
- Senior editor: Emanuele Berry
- Recording studio: Chicago, Illinois (1995–2007); New York City, New York (2007–present)
- Original release: November 17, 1995 – present
- No. of episodes: 899 (as of October 12, 2026)
- Audio format: Stereo, iTunes, SoundCloud, Google Podcasts (defunct)
- Website: www.thisamericanlife.org
- Podcast: feeds.thisamericanlife.org/talpodcast

This American Life is a weekly hour-long American radio program produced in collaboration with Chicago Public Media and hosted by Ira Glass. It is broadcast on numerous public radio stations in the United States and internationally, and is also available as a free weekly podcast. Primarily a journalistic non-fiction program, it has also featured essays, memoirs, field recordings, short fiction, and found footage. The first episode aired on November 17, 1995, under the show's original title, Your Radio Playhouse. The series was distributed by Public Radio International until June 2014, when the program became self-distributed with Public Radio Exchange delivering new episodes to public radio stations.

A television adaptation of the show ran for two seasons on the Showtime cable network between June 2007 and May 2008.

== Format ==
Each week's show has a theme, explored in several "acts". On occasion, an entire program will consist of a single act. Each act is produced by a combination of staff and freelance contributors. Programs usually begin with a short program identification by host Ira Glass who then introduces a prologue related to the theme which precedes act one. This prologue will then lead into the presentation of the theme for that week's show. After the introduction of the theme, Glass then introduces the first act of the program.

Content varies widely by episode. Stories are often told as first-person narratives. The mood of the show ranges from gloomy to ironic, from thought-provoking to humorous. The show often addresses current events, such as Hurricane Katrina in "After the Flood". Often This American Life features stories which explore aspects of human nature, such as "Kid Logic", which presented pieces on the reasoning of children. The majority of interviews with subjects never make it to the air, as many as 80 percent, because the team looks for interviewees who recount stories in a "particular way".

The end credits of each show are read by Glass, and include a sound clip extracted out of context from some portion of that show, which Glass humorously attributes to previous WBEZ general manager Torey Malatia, who co-founded the show with Glass in 1995.

Glass has stated he is contractually obligated to mention station WBEZ (and previously, also former distributor PRI) three times in the course of the show.

== History ==
In the early 1990s, Glass co-hosted, with Gary Covino, a Friday-night show in Chicago called The Wild Room. However, he was looking for new opportunities in radio, and had been sending grant proposals to the Corporation for Public Broadcasting for two years when, in 1995, the MacArthur Foundation approached Torey Malatia, general manager of Chicago Public Radio. They offered him US$150,000 to make a show featuring local Chicago writers and performance artists. Malatia approached Glass with the idea, who countered that he wanted to do a weekly program, but with a different premise, a budget of US$300,000, and sights on taking it national. In a 1998 article in the Chicago Reader, Michael Miner quoted Covino as saying, "The show [Glass] proposed was The Wild Room. He just didn't call it The Wild Room." Glass, however, did not include his co-host in his plans and assured him that the deal was unlikely to happen. When the show went on without him, Covino says he felt "betrayed". While Glass admits he wasn't transparent about his plans, in that same article, he explained, "Every week on The Wild Room we came to the show with two independent sensibilities. I love Gary. I loved Gary. But I didn't want to keep doing that show...and the notion that everything I brought to The Wild Room I got from him I find completely infuriating...I didn't want to do free-form radio anymore. I have no interest in improvisation. It might have been possible to design a show with him that he would have felt comfortable with and I would have felt comfortable with. But at that point—I was in my late 30s—I just wanted to do the thing I wanted to do."

We always saw the show as an entertainment. We saw ourselves as designing a format in opposition to the way stories were structured on NPR. We talked about it as a public radio show for people who didn't necessarily like public radio.

— Glass to The New York Review of Books, August 2019

The show debuted on WBEZ in Chicago as Your Radio Playhouse on November 17, 1995. Glass conceived a format where each segment of the show would be an "act," and at the beginning of each episode, would explain that show consisted of "documentaries, monologues, overheard conversations, found tapes, [and] anything we can think of." Glass also served as executive producer. The program's name was changed beginning with the March 21, 1996, episode, and was picked up nationally by PRI the following June. Chicago Public Media (then called the WBEZ Alliance) produced. The program's first year was produced on a budget that was tight even by US public-radio standards. A budget of $243,000 covered an outfitted studio, marketing costs, satellite time, four full-time staffers, and various freelance writers and reporters. The station was located at Chicago's Navy Pier. Early on, Glass commissioned stories from artists, writers, theater people, and journalists. National syndication began in June 1996 when Public Radio International formed a distribution partnership with the program, and the Corporation for Public Broadcasting awarded the show a three-year grant for $350,000, double what Glass applied for. As time went on, the staff was drawn more to journalistic stories that were, as Glass puts it, "in a style where there were characters and scenes and plot and funny moments." The show is also carried on Sirius XM Satellite Radio over the Public Radio International block on the XM Public Radio channel. In the early 2010s, the program consistently rated as the first- or second-most downloaded podcast on iTunes for each week.

Early response to the program was largely positive. In 1998, Mother Jones magazine called it "hip – as well as intensely literary and surprisingly irreverent." Glass used a unique strategy to promote the show to stations by giving away pledge drive ads he developed himself. By the end of 1999, TAL aired on 325 public radio stations; also around that time, Rhino Records released a "greatest hits" CD of TAL episodes.

In January 2011, the series was picked up by CBC Radio One in Canada. The program is shortened slightly for the Canadian broadcast to allow for a five-minute newscast at the top of the hour, although this is partly made up for by the removal of mid-program breaks, most of the production credits (apart from that of Malatia), and underwriting announcements (CBC's radio services being fully commercial-free, except when contractually or legally required).

In January 2012, This American Life presented excerpts from a one-man theater show The Agony and the Ecstasy of Steve Jobs by Mike Daisey as an exposé of conditions at a Foxconn factory in China. The episode was entitled "Mr. Daisey and the Apple Factory" and became one of the show's most popular episodes at that time, with 888,000 downloads and 206,000 streams. WBEZ planned to host a live showing and a Q+A of "The Agony and the Ecstasy of Steve Jobs" in Chicago on April 7, 2012. On March 16, 2012, This American Life officially retracted the episode after learning that several events recounted both in the radio story and the monologue were fabrications. WBEZ canceled the planned live performance and refunded all ticket purchases. Airing that day, This American Life devoted the week's show (titled "Retraction") to detailing the inconsistencies in "The Agony and Ecstasy of Steve Jobs". The show includes interviews between Rob Schmitz, the reporter who discovered the discrepancies, and Daisey's translator in China, Cathy Lee, as well as an interview between host Glass and Daisey. Daisey apologized for presenting his work as journalism, saying "It's not journalism. It's theater," but refused to acknowledge that he had lied—even in the face of obvious discrepancies. The podcast of this episode became the most downloaded until February 2013.

Two weeks later, the show also reiterated that they had previously removed three stories by Stephen Glass (no relation to Ira) due to dubious content, namely episode 57, "Delivery", episode 79, "Stuck in the Wrong Decade", and episode 86, "How to Take Money from Strangers." The episodes including the segments had inadvertently resurfaced in episode streams due to a website redesign. Though the segments were cut from podcast streams, the transcript of the contents have been kept accessible on the show's official website.

In 2015, the show retracted a story about canvassers who tried to change people's political opinions. The story was based on an article in Science that was also retracted.

In March 2014, the program announced that PRI would stop distributing the show in July, and that May, Glass announced that the staff would be distributing the show themselves, with Public Radio Exchange doing the technical legwork to deliver the audio to the radio stations.

On October 1, 2014, the show produced a spinoff, Serial, a season-long exploration delivered as a podcast series. In 2015, Glass became the sole owner of This American Life; WBEZ continued as a production partner on the show and on Serial with future shows to be independent. In 2017, This American Life launched the podcast S-Town through the spinoff company Serial Productions. Serial Productions was bought by The New York Times Company in 2020. The Times and Serial jointly produced the podcasts Nice White Parents, hosted by Chana Joffe-Walt, which debuted in July 2020; and The Improvement Association, hosted by Zoe Chace, which debuted in April 2021.

== Production ==
In a 2014 interview, Glass revealed the software and equipment used to make the show. The staff records interviews using Marantz PMD661 digital recorders and Audio Technica AT835b shotgun microphones. After each recording session (whether a single interview or day of recording) he uses a story structuring technique he learned from print journalist Paul Tough. He jots or types all the most memorable moments from the tape, then has the recording transcribed and makes note of any quotes of potential value in the story. He then arranges those quotes into a structured narrative.

To edit each story, the reporter presents the show to other producers.

Guests on the show have included Canadian writer Malcolm Gladwell and Michael Paterniti, who would normally command tens of thousands of dollars for an article but have settled for as little as US$200 per day to have a piece included on the show. The program helped launch the literary careers of many, including contributing editor Sarah Vowell and essayists David Rakoff and David Sedaris.

For live shows, which combine live and pre-recorded elements, Glass previously used a mixing console and CD players. With time, he switched to using an iPad Mini running TouchAble software, which in turn controls the Ableton Live software on his MacBook Air. He can plug the MacBook into the house sound system using the device's headphone jack.

The show offers two, six-month fellowship positions annually for persons who have worked in the field of journalism, but who would like training in how to tell stories in the style of This American Life. Former fellows include: Emmanuel Dzotsi, co-host of Serial season 3; BA Parker, host of NPR's Code Switch; Brian Reed, host of S-Town; Ari Saperstein, host of Blind Landing; Jessica Lussenhop, investigative reporter at ProPublica; and current staff members Dana Chivvis, Phia Bennin, Aviva DeKornfeld and Safiyah Riddle.

== Music ==
We don't use music at This American Life to create a mood in a story or make things sound pretty. Instead, it's there to help you make your point ... We're trying to point out what you should be listening for in the tape so you get the same joy or sorrow out of a story that we're feeling. And we use music the same way—it's a little flashlight that helps us get our ideas across.

— Jonathan Menjivar, in a guest post for Transom

Episodes of TAL are accompanied by music. Some songs are used between acts and are credited in the episode guide for the show. Other songs are used as thematic background music for stories and are not credited. Jonathan Menjivar is a producer and music supervisor at the show.

"Over the years, we've used hundreds of songs under our stories—and in some stories, we use a number of different songs in different sections. We tried to answer these emails for awhile [sic?], but often it was impossible sometimes to pinpoint which song people were asking about...".

== Reception ==
=== Critical reception ===
The show received positive reviews from the beginning. Marc Fisher with American Journalism Review drew attention to how the program's production style elicits "a sense of ease, informality and direct, unfiltered access", and "the effect is liberating". After remarking that producing so many stories each episode is "labor intensive," David Stewart with Current said it is "remarkable that while a few stories were fatuous or trite, most were successful and some really memorable." He added, "Whose American life is this? Clearly Ira's: it is kinky, clever, at once disingenuous and innocent, fanciful, rarely too serious...Above all, it is compelling."

The program has received criticism as well. In 2020, author Andrew J Bottomley wrote that the show primarily represents the perspective of its "predominantly white, upper-middle-class, educated audience." He also said the show is "didactic ... extracting from the stories of others a lesson that is then instilled on the audience."

=== Listenership ===
In 1999, more than 800,000 people listened to This American Life each weekend on 332 public radio stations. By 2019, the show broadcast to 2.2 million listeners each week, with an additional podcast audience of 3.6 million.

=== Awards ===
WBEZ-FM received a Peabody Award in 1996 and again in 2006 for TAL, for a show which "captures contemporary culture in fresh and inventive ways that mirror the diversity and eccentricities of its subjects" and "weav[es] original monologues, mini-dramas, original fiction, traditional radio documentaries and original radio dramas into an instructional and entertaining tapestry".

In 2020, This American Life became the first news program to win the Pulitzer Prize for Audio Reporting. The winning work was "The Out Crowd", the 688th episode with "revelatory, intimate journalism that illuminates the personal impact of the Trump Administration's 'Remain in Mexico' policy".

In March 2021, the May 9, 2008, episode, "The Giant Pool of Money", was selected by the Library of Congress for preservation in the National Recording Registry as one of 25 works added to the registry for 2020. It was the first podcast episode ever chosen for inclusion in the registry.

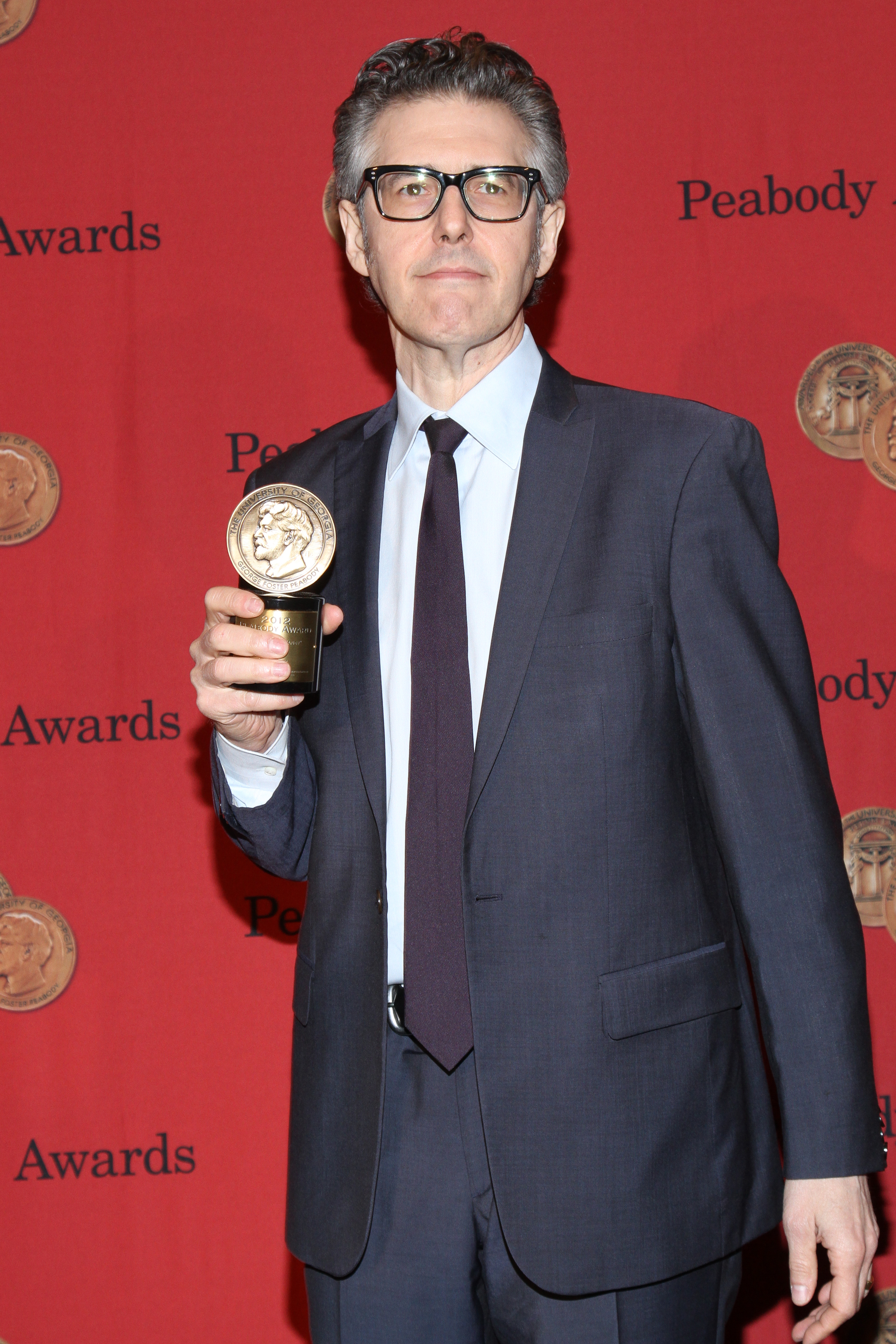
Ira Glass at the 73rd Annual Peabody Awards

Award	Year	Category	Recipient	Result	Ref.
Writers Guild Awards	2024	Radio/Audio Documentary	Episode 809: The Call	Won	
Pulitzer Prize	2020	Audio Reporting	Episode 688: The Out Crowd	Won	
Livingston Award	2002	National Reporting	Episode 204: 81 Words	Won	
Scripps Howard Foundation	2013	Jack R. Howard Award	Serial	Won	
Scripps Howard Foundation	2004	Electronic Media	Episode 266: I'm From the Private Sector and I'm Here to Help	Won	
Edward R. Murrow Award	2016	News Documentary	Episode 570: The Night in Question	Won	
Edward R. Murrow Award	2016	Continuing Coverage	Episode 554: Not It!	Won	
Edward R. Murrow Award	2011	News Documentary	Episode 398: Long Shot	Won	
Edward R. Murrow Award	2005	News Documentary	Episode 266: I'm From the Private Sector and I'm Here to Help	Won	
Alfred I. duPont–Columbia University Award	1999	Broadcast Journalism	Episode 103: Scenes from a Transplant	Won	
Alfred I. duPont–Columbia University Award	2007	Broadcast Journalism	Episode 322: Shouting Across The Divide	Won	
Alfred I. duPont–Columbia University Award	2009	Broadcast Journalism	Episode 355: The Giant Pool of Money	Won	
Alfred I. duPont–Columbia University Award	2014	Broadcast Journalism	Episodes 487/488: Harper High School Parts 1 and 2	Won	
Alfred I. duPont–Columbia University Award	2016	Broadcast Journalism	Serial	Won	
Alfred I. duPont–Columbia University Award	2018	Broadcast Journalism	Episode 600: Will I Know Anyone At This Party?	Won	
Alfred I. duPont–Columbia University Award	2019	Broadcast Journalism	Episodes 632/633: Our Town	Won	
Alfred I. duPont–Columbia University Award	2023	Broadcast Journalism	Episode 758: Talking While Black	Won	
New York Festivals Award	2007		Episode 321: Sink or Swim	Won	
George Polk Award	2008	Best Radio Reporting	Episode 355: The Giant Pool of Money	Won	
George Polk Award	2012	Best Radio Reporting	Episode 430: Very Tough Love	Won	
George Polk Award	2015	Best Radio Reporting	Episode 562/563: The Problem That We All Live With	Won	
Third Coast International Audio Festival	2001	Best New Artist	Episode 186: Prom	Won	
Third Coast International Audio Festival	2002	Best Documentary	Episode 175: Babysitting	gold	
Third Coast International Audio Festival	2003	Best Documentary	Episode 230: Come Back to Afghanistan	silver	
Peabody Awards	1996	Podcast & Radio	This American Life	Won	
Peabody Awards	2006	Podcast & Radio	Habeas Schmabeas	Won	
Peabody Awards	2008	Podcast & Radio	The Giant Pool of Money	Won	
Peabody Awards	2012	Podcast & Radio	What Happened at Dos Erres	Won	
Peabody Awards	2013	Podcast & Radio	Harper High School	Won	
Peabody Awards	2014	Podcast & Radio	Serial	Won	
Peabody Awards	2015	Podcast & Radio	Episodes "Three Miles", "The Problem We All Live With – Part One" and "The Problem We All Live With – Part Two"	Won	
Peabody Awards	2016	Podcast & Radio	Anatomy of Doubt	Won	
Peabody Awards	2022	Podcast & Radio	The Pink House at the Center of the World	Won	

== Adaptations ==
=== Television ===
Discussions of a television adaptation of TAL date back to at least 1999. However, the show's creative team was unsure of what the show would "look like" and, with so much money on the line, turned down offers. In January 2006, Showtime announced it had greenlit six episodes of a new series based on TAL. The announcement noted that each half-hour episode would "be hosted by Ira Glass and [...] explore a single theme or topic through the unique juxtaposition of first-person storytelling and whimsical narrative."

For budgetary reasons, Glass and four of the radio show's producers left Chicago for New York City, where Showtime is headquartered. In January 2007, it was announced that Glass had completed production on the show's first season, with the first episode set to premiere on March 22. Originally the series had a contract for a total of 30 shows over the four years, but after two seasons Glass announced that he and the other creators of the show had "asked to be taken off TV", largely in part to the difficult schedule required to produce a television program. He went on to state that the show is officially "on hiatus", but would like to do a television special at some point in the future.

The episode "The Anatomy of Doubt" based on reporting by ProPublica and The Marshall Project was adapted into the Netflix series Unbelievable.

=== Film ===
Stories from TAL have been used as the basis of movie scripts. In 2002 the show signed a six-figure deal with Warner Bros. giving the studio two years of "first-look" rights to its hundreds of past and future stories. One film to have emerged from the deal is Unaccompanied Minors, a 2006 film directed by Paul Feig and based on "In The Event of An Emergency, Put Your Sister in an Upright Position" from "Babysitting". Ira Glass and longtime TAL producer Julie Snyder were both executive producers on the film. In June 2008, Spike Lee bought the movie rights to Ronald Mallett's memoir, whose story was featured in the episode "My Brilliant Plan". Potential Warner Bros films from TAL episodes include "Niagara", which explored the town of Niagara Falls, New York, after those who sought to exploit the tourism and hydroelectrical opportunities of the area left; "Wonder Woman" (from the episode "Superpowers"), the story of an adolescent who took steps to become the superhero she dreamed of being, well into adulthood; and "Act V", about the last act of Hamlet as staged by inmates from a maximum security prison as part of Prison Performing Arts Adult Theatre Projects. Paramount Pictures and Broadway Video are in production on Curly Oxide and Vic Thrill, a film based on the TAL story in the episode "My Experimental Phase".

This American Life's 168th episode, "The Fix Is In", inspired screenwriter Scott Burns to adapt Kurt Eichenwald's book about business executive and FBI informant Mark Whitacre, titled The Informant, into a major motion picture. The film was directed by Steven Soderbergh and stars Matt Damon. Glass has stated that the radio show has no financial stake in the film, but noted that he appreciated how well the movie stuck to the original facts.

This American Life's 361st episode's, "Fear of Sleep", section "Stranger in the Night" featured an excerpt from Mike Birbiglia's one-man show, "Sleepwalk with Me". This inspired Glass to work with Birbiglia for two years on a movie based on this segment. The film version of Sleepwalk with Me screened at the Sundance Film Festival on January 23, 2012, to favorable reviews, winning the "Best of NEXT Audience Award".

In May 2011, Walt Disney Pictures announced it was adapting a movie from a 2009 episode titled "The Girlfriend Equation".

The 2018 film Come Sunday was based on a 2005 TAL story called "Heretics," about controversial Tulsa preacher Carlton Pearson.

In 2019, Lulu Wang adapted her autobiographical story called "What You Don't Know" from the 2016 episode "In Defense of Ignorance" into The Farewell.

The 2019 film Ode to Joy was adapted from a TAL story by Chris Higgins called "I've Fallen in Love and I Can't Get Up."

=== Live tours ===
This American Life has taken the radio show on the road three times since 2000; material recorded on each of the three tours has been edited into an episode which aired on the radio shortly after the tour. Other episodes include segments recorded live.

- "Music Lessons", recorded at the Yerba Buena Center for the Arts in San Francisco during the 1998 Public Radio Conference in San Francisco. Performers include Sarah Vowell, David Sedaris and Anne Lamott. Music includes elementary school students from the San Francisco Unified School District as well as "Eyes on the Sparrow" with Renola Garrison vocals and Anne Jefferson on piano.
- "What Are You Looking At?," recorded in December 1998 at The Town Hall (New York City). Performers include Sarah Vowell and David Rakoff, with music by They Might Be Giants.
- "Advice", recorded in 1999 in Seattle and at HBO's U.S. Comedy Arts Festival in Aspen. Performers include Sarah Vowell, Dan Savage, and Cheryl Trykv with music from the Black Cat Orchestra.
- "Birthdays, Anniversaries and Milestones", recorded in December 2000 in Boston (Berklee Performance Center), New York, Chicago (Merle Reskin Theatre), and Los Angeles. Performers included Sarah Vowell, Russell Banks, David Rakoff, Ian Brown, and OK Go.
- "Lost in America", recorded in May 2003 in Boston, Washington, D.C., Portland, Denver, and Chicago. Performers included Sarah Vowell, Davy Rothbart, and Jonathan Goldstein. Jon Langford of the Mekons led the "Lost in America House Band" during the show.
- "What I Learned from Television", recorded in February and March 2007 in New York City (February 26 at Avery Fisher Hall, Lincoln Center); Boston (February 27 at the Boston Opera House); Minneapolis (February 28 at the Orpheum Theatre); Chicago (March 1 at the Chicago Theatre); Seattle (March 7 at the Paramount Theatre); and Los Angeles (March 12 at Royce Hall, UCLA). Directed by Jane Feltes, performers on this tour included David Rakoff, Sarah Vowell, John Hodgman, Dan Savage, Jonathan Goldstein, and Chris Wilcha. In New York, Boston, Seattle, Chicago, and Minneapolis, Mates of State were the house band, while in Los Angeles, OK Go performed between acts.

=== Digital cinema ===
On May 1, 2008, This American Life was the first major public media program to use digital cinema, distributing a one-hour-long program titled This American Life – Live! to select cinemas. PRI originally conceived of the idea to serve stations around the country. This American Life Live! was presented exclusively in select theatres by National CineMedia's (NCM) Fathom, in partnership with BY Experience and Chicago Public Radio, and in association with Public Radio International.

On April 23, 2009, This American Life broadcast a second theater event, titled This American Life – Live! Returning to the Scene of the Crime. Contributors included Mike Birbiglia, Starlee Kine, Dan Savage, David Rakoff, and Joss Whedon.

On May 10, 2012, This American Life broadcast a third theater event, titled Invisible Made Visible. Contributors included David Sedaris, David Rakoff, Tig Notaro, Ryan Knighton, and Mike Birbiglia, who made a short film with Terry Gross.

On June 7, 2014, This American Life recorded a fourth live event titled The Radio Drama Episode. Contributors included Carin Gilfry, Lin-Manuel Miranda, Mike Birbiglia, Joshua Bearman, and Sasheer Zamata. The episode was broadcast on radio and the podcast on June 20, 2014.

=== Podcast ===
From 1998 to 2005, the program could be accessed online in two formats: a free RealAudio stream available from the official show website, and a DRM-encrypted download available through Audible.com, which charged $4 per episode. In early 2006, the program began to offer MP3 copies of each episode, which could be streamed from the show's website using a proprietary Flash player. Aware that more people were listening through headphones and so could hear mistakes more clearly, the production sought to improve the mixing and editing.

Since October 2006, the program has offered a free podcast feed to the public. Under this arrangement, each show is made available to podcast feeds and aggregation programs Sunday evening at 8 p.m. ET, allowing radio stations a 43-hour window of exclusivity to carry the episode. After seven days, the link to the MP3 is removed from the podcast feed. Older shows can be streamed online via the show's website, or purchased from Apple's iTunes Store for $0.95 per episode.

Since the move to MP3 files in 2006, the show has relied on an extremely lightweight digital rights management system, based on security through obscurity and legal threats. While the show episodes are removed from the podcast RSS feed after a week, they remain on This American Life's server, accessible to anyone who knows the location. On at least three occasions, Internet users have created their own unofficial podcast feeds, deep linking to the MP3 files located on the This American Life webserver. In all three instances, the podcast feeds were removed from the Internet once representatives from Public Radio International contacted the individuals responsible for creating the feeds.

As of March 2012, a typical podcast episode was downloaded 750,000 times.

=== Mobile apps ===
In February 2010, Public Radio Exchange launched a mobile app on Apple's iTunes Store. This app contains MP3 audio of the podcast.

In October 2016, This American Life launched an app called Shortcut to allow listeners to share short audio clips on social media, similar to the way gifs allow social media users to share video clips. Stephanie Foo served as project lead, collaborating with developers Courtney Stanton and Darius Kazemi of Feel Train. In the app, listeners can select an audio clip of up to 30 seconds to post to social media, where the audio plays and displays a transcription of the clip. The app's initial iteration operates on This American Life's archives, but the project code will be released as open-source software, available for other audio projects to adopt.

=== Other media ===
Some of the show's episodes are accompanied by multimedia downloads available on This American Life's website. For example, a cover version of the Elton John song "Rocket Man" was produced for episode 223, "Classifieds", and released as an MP3.

Four two-disc CD sets collecting some of the producers' favorite acts have been released: Lies, Sissies, and Fiascoes: The Best of This American Life was released on May 4, 1999; Crimebusters + Crossed Wires: Stories from This American Life was released on November 11, 2003; Davy Rothbart: This American Life was released in 2004; and Stories of Hope and Fear was released on November 7, 2006.

A 32-page comic book, Radio: An Illustrated Guide (ISBN 0-9679671-0-4), documents how an episode of TAL is put together. It was drawn by cartoonist Jessica Abel, written by Abel and Glass, and first published in 1999.

The cover of "The Lives They Lived" edition of The New York Times Magazine published on December 25, 2011, read "These American Lives" after a special section of the magazine edited by Glass and other staff of the show.

== Cultural impact ==
Marc Fisher with American Journalism Review wrote, in a 1999 article on the show, that "in ways small but clear, as inspiration if not direct model, This American Life is at the vanguard of a shift in American journalism." In the book Sound Streams—A Cultural History of Radio-Internet Convergence, author Andrew Bottomley calls the show "the archetype of the modern US feature-documentary mode."

This American Life was an early adopter to the podcast format and became a forerunner of the medium. Steph Harmon with The Guardian remarked that the show is "often credited for ushering in not only a public radio revolution, but the rise of storytelling as an industry and podcasting as a form."

=== Depictions in the media ===
Television shows and movies have made allusions to the program. This American Life was referenced in a 2018 episode of The Big Bang Theory.

Summer Roberts, in The O.C., asked of This American Life, "Is that that show by those hipster know-it-alls who talk about how fascinating ordinary people are? Ekhh. God." Glass, a fan of the teen soap opera, played the line during an episode about TAL's 2007 live tour. After hearing the line, he said, "I literally stood up and went like—like did that just happen?

During a crowd interaction in Mike Birbiglia's 2017 standup special 'Thank God for Jokes', a frustrated Birbiglia exclaims "We don't all have to be Ira Glass here!" in response to the audience member.

The show has also been the subject of parodies. The satirical newspaper The Onion published a story on April 20, 2007, entitled "'This American Life' Completes Documentation Of Liberal, Upper-Middle-Class Existence." In 2011, comedy writer Julian Joslin (with Michael Grinspan) released a parody of TAL entitled "This American Laugh" on YouTube, wherein a fictional Glass makes a sex tape with Fresh Air's Terry Gross. The spoof was viewed over 100,000 times in one week. In response, Glass said, "hearing his version of me, made what I do on the air seem kind of dumb. And the impersonation was so good ... I had to decide, 'Do I want to see myself as kind of trite and dumb?' Seemed better to stop." Fred Armisen parodied Ira Glass for a skit on Saturday Night Live's "Weekend Update" in 2011. The skit was cut from the show on the grounds that Ira Glass was "not famous enough" to be parodied on Saturday Night Live. Glass then invited Armisen to impersonate him as a guest co-host for an episode of TAL in January 2013. In 2013, Stanley Chase III, Mickey Dwyer, Ken Fletcher, and Matt Gifford launched the parody podcast That American Life on iTunes, which is hosted by "Ira Class". In two episodes of season one of Orange Is the New Black, Robert Stanton portrays radio personality Maury Kind, an NPR host of a show called Urban Tales. The show within a show is a fictional portrayal of TAL.

Glass has made appearances as himself in fictional works. In the 2014 film Veronica Mars, the character Stosh "Piz" Piznarski works at This American Life, and Glass and many TAL staffers appear in background roles. Glass also had a cameo appearance in the 22nd-season premiere of The Simpsons, entitled "Elementary School Musical". Lisa plays This American Life on her iPod and Glass introduces the theme of the day's show, "Today in Five Acts: Condiments". In the American Dad! episode, "Honey, I'm Homeland", Glass plays himself in a voice-only role. Members of an "Occupy" group kidnap Stan after he tries to infiltrate their group. While he is in captivity, they try to brainwash him by playing an episode of This American Life in which Glass talks about a dog and his owner, who also happens to be a dog. Stan objects to Glass's pauses between lines, questioning why they are necessary if he already has them written down in front of him. When Stan has been fully brainwashed and is released, he continues to listen to Glass as he touts the benefits of paying for radio. In a season 6 episode of 30 Rock called "St. Patrick's Day," Glass's voice appears on the radio, apparently presenting TAL, with his studio having been overrun by drunken thugs. In the 2014 episode of Bojack Horseman called "Live Fast, Diane Nguyen," Glass voices Diane's ringtone during a meeting with Bojack and his publisher, thanking her for being a sustaining member of public radio. Much of the TAL staff made a cameo on the season four opener of the HBO show High Maintenance, in an episode that told the story of a fictional new reporter at the radio program.
