= Ira Glass =

American radio personality (born 1959)

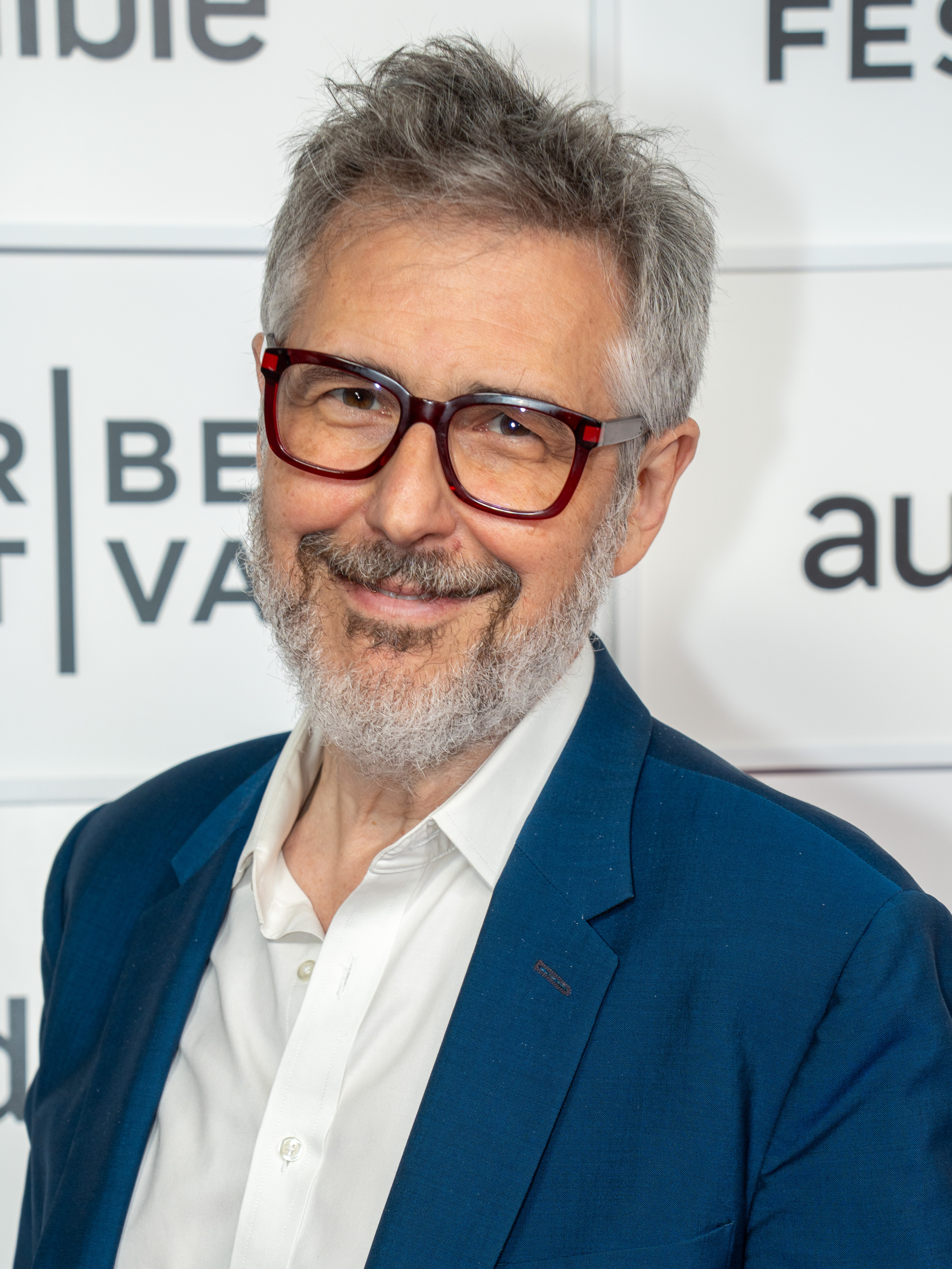
- Glass at the 2025 Tribeca Festival
- Born: Ira Jeffrey Glass; March 3, 1959 (age 67); Baltimore, Maryland, U.S.
- Education: Northwestern University; Brown University (BA)
- Occupations: Radio personality; producer; writer
- Years active: 1978–present
- Spouses: Anaheed Alani (m. 2005; div. 2018) Susanna Fogel (m. 2025)

Ira Jeffrey Glass (/ˈaɪrə/; born March 3, 1959) is an American public radio personality. He is the host and producer of the radio and television series This American Life and has participated in NPR programs, including Morning Edition, All Things Considered, and Talk of the Nation. His work in radio and television has won him awards, such as the Edward R. Murrow Award for Outstanding Contributions to Public Radio and the George Polk Award in Radio Reporting.

Originally from Baltimore, Glass began working in radio as a teenager. While attending Brown University, he worked alongside Keith Talbot at NPR during his summer breaks. He worked as a story editor and interviewer for years before he began to cover his own stories in his late twenties. After he moved to Chicago, he continued to work on the public radio programs All Things Considered and The Wild Room, the latter of which he co-hosted. After Glass received a grant from the MacArthur Foundation, he and Torey Malatia developed This American Life, which won a Peabody Award within its first six months and became nationally syndicated a year later. The show was formulated into a television program of the same name on Showtime that ran for two seasons. Glass also performs a live show, and has contributed to or written articles, books, and a comic book related to the radio show.

== Early life and education ==
Glass was born in Baltimore, Maryland, on March 3, 1959, to Jewish parents Barry and Shirley Glass, and grew up with two sisters, one younger and one older. Barry started out as a radio announcer, but eventually became a CPA, while Shirley Glass was a clinical psychologist whose work prompted The New York Times to call her "the godmother of infidelity research".

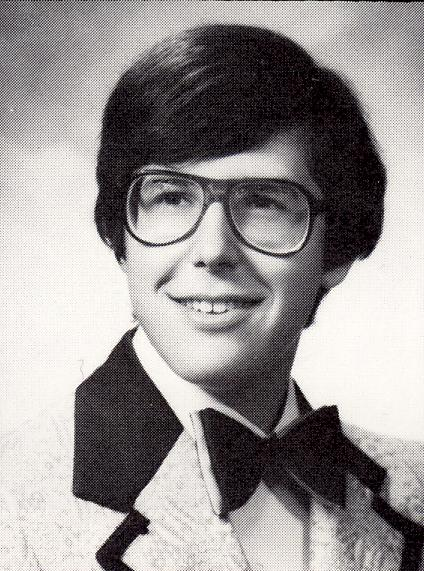
Glass's high school senior portrait

As a child, Glass wanted to be an astronaut, while his parents hoped he would become a doctor. From a young age, he loved comedy and his family frequented the theater. By the time he was 11, he and his sister put on shows in their house's basement and invited neighborhood children to watch. As a teen, he moonlighted as a magician.

Glass attended Milford Mill High School in Baltimore County where he held editorial roles as a member of the school's yearbook staff and as co-editor of the student literary magazine. His involvement in yearbook started in tenth grade and continued until his graduation in 1977. As a member of the Milford drama club, Glass was cast in several stage productions: his roles include Captain George Brackett in Milford's 1975 production of South Pacific, Lowe in the school's 1976 production of Damn Yankees, and Bud Frump in its 1977 production of How to Succeed in Business Without Really Trying. Glass was also a member of the International Thespian Society. Glass has remarked that his style of journalism is heavily influenced by the musicals he enjoyed when he was younger, especially Fiddler on the Roof. He was involved in student government during his junior and senior years as a member of the executive board, made Milford's morning announcements, and was a member of the Milford Mill Honor Society in 1977. While in high school, he wrote jokes for Baltimore radio personality Johnny Walker.

After Glass graduated from high school, he was accepted into Northwestern University in Evanston, Illinois, and was initially a pre-medical student. He attended with fellow alum Mary Zimmerman, though he did not know her at the time. He spent a lot of time at the university's radio station making its promos. He transferred to Brown University, where he concentrated in semiotics. There, he was introduced to S/Z by Roland Barthes, an analysis that, in hindsight, "made [him] understand what [he] could do in radio". He graduated in 1982.

== Career ==
=== Early career ===
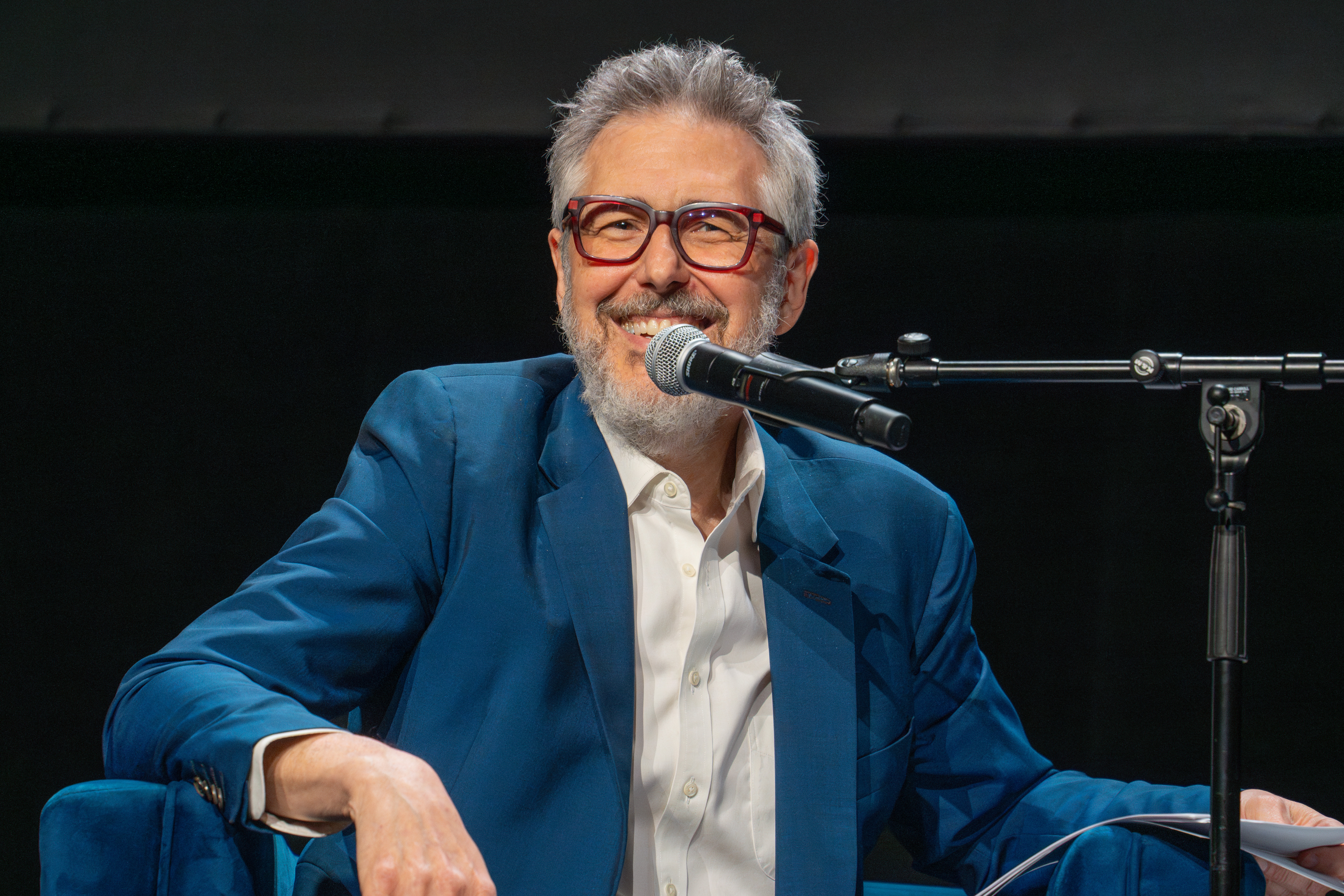
Ira Glass at the 2025 Tribeca Festival

After his freshman year, 19-year-old Glass looked around Baltimore for work in television, radio, and advertising without success; meanwhile, he was employed in the shock trauma unit at a medical center. After someone at the local rock station recommended that he seek out Jay Kernis at National Public Radio's headquarters in Washington, D.C., he found work as an unpaid intern editing promotional announcements, before becoming the production assistant to Keith Talbot. At the end of the summer, he chose to stay with NPR and abandon medicine, a decision that disappointed his parents. When he graduated from college, they placed a sardonic ad in the classified section of their local newspaper that read, "Corporate office seeks semiotics grad for high paying position." Talbot brought Glass with him to New York between 1986-87 as an intern on Kids America produced at WNYC. In Glass's half-hour weekly segments, he took the on-air persona of "Bob" and asked opinion poll style questions.

Glass returned to DC and worked at NPR for 17 years, where he eventually graduated to being a tape-cutter, before becoming a reporter and host on several NPR programs, including Morning Edition, All Things Considered, and Talk of the Nation. In an interview, Glass recalled that his first show was with NPR's Joe Frank, and says the experience influenced him in a "huge way", adding: "Before I saw Joe put together a show, I had never thought about radio as a place where you could tell a certain kind of story." He has also said that editing for Noah Adams, an early host of All Things Considered, taught him how "to step back from the action and move to some bigger thought and then return to the plot", a technique that he still uses to structure This American Life. As he approached 30, he tried reporting his own stories, but said he was not good at it and that he performed poorly on air, took a long time to create a single piece, and did not have strong interviewing skills.

In 1989, Glass followed his then-girlfriend, cartoonist Lynda Barry, to Chicago and settled into the Lakeview neighborhood. Although he began producing award-winning reports for NPR's All Things Considered, specifically on school reform at Taft High School and Irving Elementary School, Glass said it was a piece he did on the 75th anniversary of Oreo cookies that taught him how to write for radio. Soon, he and Gary Covino created and co-hosted a Friday-night WBEZ Chicago Public Radio program called The Wild Room, which featured eclectic content with a loose style and aired for the first time in November 1990. By this time, Barry and Glass were no longer a couple, but she initially collaborated on the project, even giving the show its title after she and Glass agreed that Covino's suggestion (The Rainbow Room) was "stupid". The first show aired in November 1990. In Glass's first professional interview (with Cara Jepsen in 1993), he said: "I like to think of it as the only show on public radio other than Car Talk that both NPR news analyst Daniel Schorr and Kurt Cobain could listen to." During this time they spent two years reporting on the Chicago Public Schools—one year at a high school, and another at an elementary school. The largest finding of their investigations was that smaller class sizes would contribute to more success in impoverished, inner-city schools.

Glass eventually tired of "free-form radio" and, looking at other opportunities, began sending grant proposals to the Corporation for Public Broadcasting.

=== This American Life ===
In 1995, the MacArthur Foundation approached Torey Malatia, the general manager of Chicago Public Radio, with an offer of US$150,000 to produce a show featuring local Chicago writers and performance artists. Malatia approached Glass with the idea, who countered that he wanted to do a weekly program, but with a different premise, a budget of US$300,000, and a desire to make it a national show. He then took two months off without pay to work on the pilot. Glass, however, didn't include his co-host in his plans, assuring him that the deal was unlikely to happen. When the show went on without him, Covino says he felt "betrayed". He continued to produce The Wild Room alone until February 1996.

You have to ask yourself, What is the radio good for? The radio is good for taking somebody else's experience and making you understand what it would be like. Because when you don't see someone, but you hear them talking—and, uh, that is what radio is all about—it's like when someone is talking from the heart. Everything about it conspires to take you into somebody else's world.

— Ira Glass in an interview with Chicago Magazine

Early on, the idea was to make a show telling stories of "nobody who's famous, nothing you've ever heard of, nothing in the news". The everyday stories would be placed between works from journalists, fiction authors, or performing artists. Glass invited David Sedaris to read his essays on the program before producing Sedaris's commentaries on NPR and contributing to Sedaris's success as an independent author. The show—then called Your Radio Playhouse—first aired on November 17, 1995; the episode was titled "New Beginnings". It included interviews with talk-show host Joe Franklin and Shirley Glass—who maintained her position that her son should consider work in television because of his resemblance to Hugh Grant—as well as stories by Kevin Kelly (the founding editor of Wired) and performance artist Lawrence Steger. The show's name changed to This American Life beginning with the episode on March 21, 1996, and was syndicated nationally in June 1996 by Public Radio International after NPR passed on it.

Glass devoted himself to the effort by making the daily commute from his North Side apartment and spending 70 to 80 hours per week in the offices on the Navy Pier.

The show quickly received wide acclaim and is often credited with changing the landscape of journalistic radio in the US. It won a Peabody Award within six months of its first broadcast for excellence in broadcast media. The fictional pieces were gradually replaced with more reporting in a storytelling format, such as in the show's coverage of victims of Hurricane Katrina. Over the years, guest contributors included Dave Eggers, Sarah Vowell, Michael Chabon, Tobias Wolff, Anne Lamott and Spalding Gray. On November 17, 2005, This American Life reached its tenth anniversary and the following week, in celebration, broadcast for the first time outside of Chicago.

The television network Showtime approached the show's production team and proposed to convert This American Life into a television program; the team originally refused, as they did not want to compromise the format and make something "tacky and awful", but agreed to make the program for television after Showtime conceded to various conditions, including a format that did not resemble a news magazine. After viewing the pilot, Showtime ordered six episodes in January 2007 and the first half-hour episode aired on March 22, 2007. Glass had to move to New York for filming, and said in an interview with Patt Morrison on Southern California Public Radio that he lost 30 pounds (14 kg) over the project. The show aired for thirteen episodes over two seasons before ending in 2009 because of the heavy workload needed to produce it.

Chicago Public Media announced it would begin self-distribution of This American Life starting on July 1, 2014, through Public Radio Exchange (PRX).

By 2020, This American Life reached more than 4.7 million listeners each week. Glass can be heard in all but four episodes. In July 2013, the 500th episode premiered. For the 2013 fiscal year, the WBEZ board voted to raise Glass's salary from $170,000 annually to $278,000. However, he requested that it be lowered to $146,000 the following year, and has since asked for it be lowered again, calling the original sum "unseemly". He supplements his income with speaking engagements, which earn him "five figures per talk".

In May 2009, the This American Life radio show episode "Return to the Scene of the Crime" was broadcast live to more than 300 movie theaters.

=== Other works ===
Outside of radio, Glass has also worked as a print author. In September 1999, he collaborated on a comic book, Radio: An Illustrated Guide, with Jessica Abel. The book describes how This American Life is produced and instructs the reader into building their own radio program. In October 2007, he published the anthology The New Kings of Nonfiction.

Glass has collaborated on several feature films. In the show's contract with Warner Bros., This American Life has first pick options on any films that emerge from stories of that program. By extension, Glass goes to Warner Bros. with any movie idea he may have. In 2006, he was an executive producer of the feature film Unaccompanied Minors, which is based on the true story of what happened to This American Life contributing editor Susan Burton and her sister Betsy at an airport one day before Christmas. Burton had already produced a segment on This American Life about the same experience before the story was adapted to film. In 2007, he and Dylan Kidd wrote a screenplay based on the nonfiction book Urban Tribes about a man who must choose between his friends and his girlfriend. Glass also produced the 2018 Netflix movie Come Sunday.

Glass regularly collaborates with comedian Mike Birbiglia. In 2012, Glass co-wrote and produced Birbiglia's film Sleepwalk with Me and they both went on a country-wide promotional tour for the film to give interviews and visit theaters to introduce the film. On September 17, 2012, Glass made a special voice appearance on The Colbert Report with Stephen Colbert to promote Sleepwalk with Me and invite Colbert to participate in a This American Life episode. Glass was credited as a co-producer in Birbiglia's 2016 film Don't Think Twice, alongside Miranda Bailey and Amanda Marshall. Glass is also the producer for Birbiglia's 2018 one-man Broadway show The New One.

In 2013, Glass partnered with Monica Bill Barnes & Company to produce Three Acts, Two Dancers, One Radio Host and worked alongside Monica Bill Barnes and Anna Bass.

Glass toured Google's headquarters in November 2013 and met the Google Doodle team, who collectively agreed to collaborate with This American Life. Glass suggested that for Valentine's Day 2014 they interview "random" people about their experiences with love. Users in the American market could click on a candy heart that corresponded to each letter in "Google" and listen to a different story of unusual love in the same style as the radio program. Roger Neill composed the music, while Glass, fellow American Life producer Miki Meek, and Birbiglia conducted the interviews.

In 2019, Glass went on tour with the show Seven Things I've Learned, where he talks about the art of storytelling. The titles of the show's acts include "How to tell a story", "Save the cat", "Failure is Success", "Amuse yourself", and "It's war". Two dancers from Monica Bill Barnes & Company, whom Glass had collaborated with before, performed in the show.

== Tours ==
- This American Life — Live! (2009)
- Three Acts, Two Dancers, One Radio Host (2013–2017)
- Seven Things I've Learned (2019)

== Books ==
- Radio: An Illustrated Guide (1999)—written with Jessica Abel
- The New Kings of Nonfiction (2007)

== Appearances ==
Glass made several appearances on late-night television, his first being Late Show With David Letterman. He has also been on The Colbert Report.

In 2004, UCLA commissioned a one-night storytelling event called Visible and Invisible Drawings: An Evening With Chris Ware and Ira Glass. In February 2005, Glass visited the Orpheum Theater in New Orleans to present Lies and Sissies and Fiascoes, Oh, My!, which shares a name with a This American Life compilation album. Glass served as the monologist for ASSSSCAT at the Upright Citizens Brigade Theatre in New York on February 21, 2010. On September 17, 2011, Glass participated in the Drunk Show at the Eugene Mirman Comedy Festival, during which Glass became so drunk he blacked out and vomited backstage.

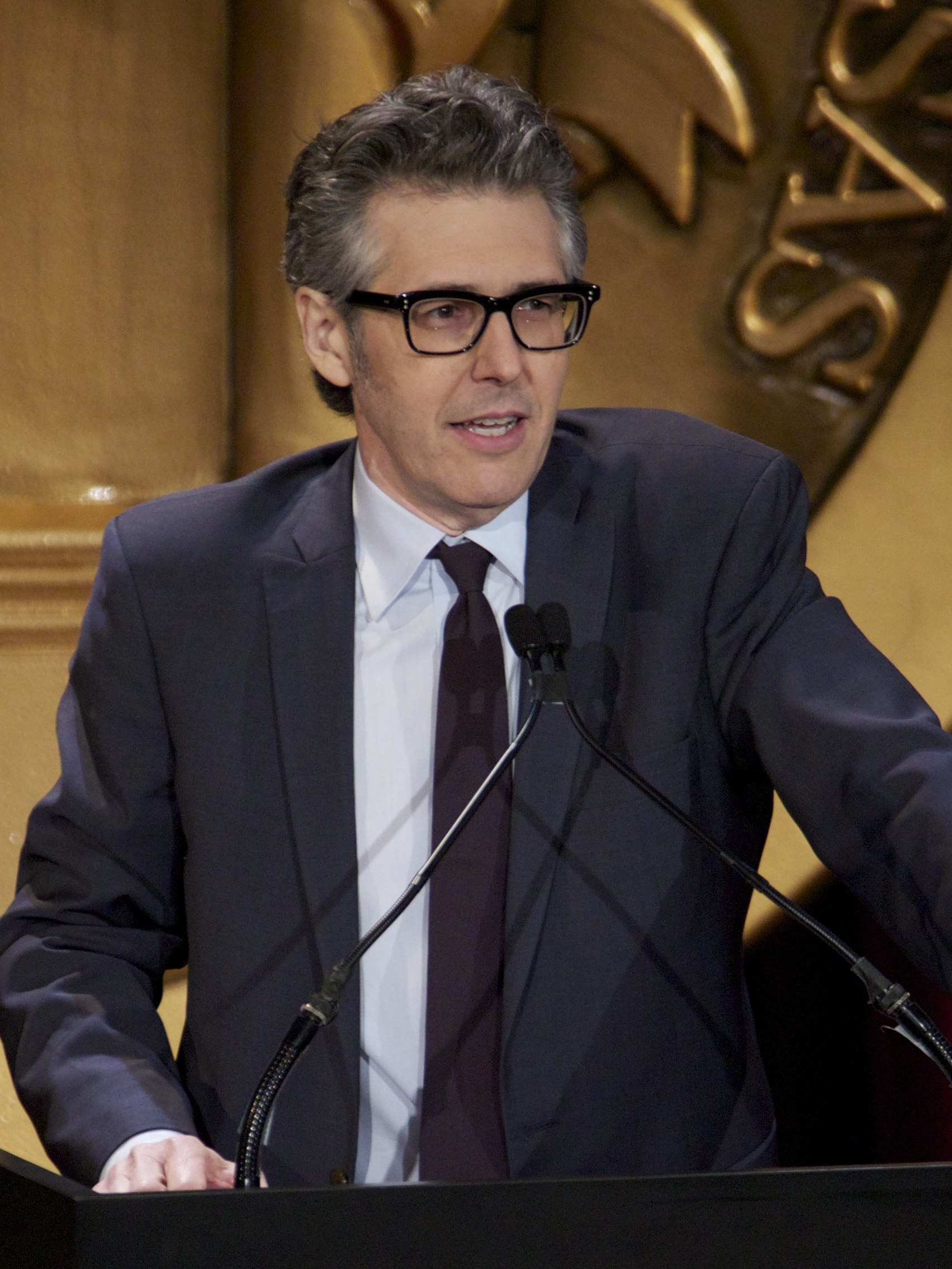
Glass in 2014

Glass has been a guest on various podcasts, such as TBTL. On February 24, 2010, the podcast Freakonomics published a bonus episode (after its first) interviewing Glass on how to make a great podcast. On June 17, 2011, he and his wife at the time, Anaheed Alani, appeared on the podcast How Was Your Week, where he revealed that, if he were not in radio, he would be a professional poker player. Glass appeared on the edition of June 24, 2011, of The Adam Carolla Podcast, where he and Adam Carolla discussed the podcast claiming the title of "Most Downloaded Podcast" from the Guinness Book of World Records. On September 19, 2011, Glass appeared on WTF Live with Marc Maron. Glass guest co-hosted Dan Savage's sex-advice podcast, "Savage Love", on January 31, 2012. On Monday, November 24, 2014, Glass appeared on the Here's The Thing podcast. In 2022, Glass's interview with Debbie Millman was featured on the Storybound season 5 premiere.

On May 18, 2012, Glass gave the commencement address for the Goucher College class of 2012 graduation ceremony, where he also received an honorary degree. Glass was one of the voice artists for the audiobook "Suddenly, a Knock on the Door: Stories" by Etgar Keret.

Glass also lent his voice to The Simpsons in Season 22 in the episode "Elementary School Musical" and appeared in a green motion capture suit in a John Hodgman segment on The Daily Show with Jon Stewart on November 4, 2010, where he acted as the main character of the Grand Theft Auto: Vice City video game. Archival footage of Glass is used in the film We Cause Scenes, which premiered at the 2013 South by Southwest conference. In 2014, Glass appeared as himself in the film adaptation of the U.S. television series Veronica Mars and in the extended cut of John Hodgman's Netflix comedy special John Hodgman: Ragnarok. In 2018, Glass made a cameo appearance in the film Ocean's 8. In 2019 Glass appeared as himself in the episode "The Struggle for Stonewall" (season 1, episode 8) of the Fox legal drama Proven Innocent.

Ben Sinclair, a co-creator of HBO's TV show High Maintenance, sought out Glass to appear in the 2020 season premiere.

== Public image ==
Glass has been called a visionary for his work in radio. In 2001, Time magazine named Glass the "Best Radio Host in America". Critics remark on the dedication and distinct vision he brings to the show. Steve Johnson with the Chicago Tribune called Glass "the deliberately mysterious, apparently highly romantic force who is the program's host, co-founder and executive producer". After remarking that, unlike on most shows, Glass serves as the director, senior producer, host, administrator, librarian, and researcher, Chicago writer Sarah Vowell said, "Part of that is that he's a control freak. Part of it is he has so much experience. Part of it is he really does have a vision for the show." Glass is credited with being a forebear of podcasting and modern audio storytelling. Samuel Fishwick of the Evening Standard called Glass the "godfather of podcasting".

I don't have a good radio voice. But this thing happens now. People say "you have such a nice radio voice." And I say, that's the force of repetition. You're used to hearing me on the radio, so it seems like I should be on the radio. But when you hear me versus someone who should really be on the radio, you can tell, that I really have no business being on the radio.

— Glass in a 2011 interview

The nature of his voice also inspires commentary in the media. Vogue called his voice "the aural embodiment of Sensitive Guy Who Is Friends with All the Girls." American Journalism Review called his voice "adenoidal" and said it has a "slight stutter, not a speech defect, but a verbal tic, a device". Johnson said Glass's voice sounds like it does not belong on the radio and that it is "kind of querulous, decidedly conversational."

Jenji Kohan has said that Glass is part of the inspiration behind the character Maury Kind on her show Orange Is the New Black, in particular, his glasses. She offered Glass a role on the show, but he "politely declined" the offer due to his busy schedule.

== Personal life ==
For a time, Glass dated cartoonist and author Lynda Barry. She briefly joined him in Washington, D.C., but she moved to Chicago to be near fellow cartoonists in the summer of 1989, with Glass following her. Reflecting on the relationship, Barry called it the "worst thing [she] ever did", and said he told her she "was boring and shallow, and...wasn't enough in the moment for him." She later drew a comic based on their relationship titled "Head Lice and My Worst Boyfriend", which was later included in her book One! Hundred! Demons!... Glass did not deny her assertions, and told the Chicago Reader: "I was an idiot. I was in the wrong...about so many things with her. Anything bad she says about me I can confirm."

Glass married Anaheed Alani, a writer and editor, in August 2005. They had dated before splitting harshly, but decided to give the relationship another try. "We have the entire Middle East crisis in our house," joked Glass. "Her mom is Christian and her dad is Muslim, from Iraq." They owned a pit bull named Piney, which they refused to put down even after it bit several people including two children, drawing blood. (Glass referred to these bites as "nips".) In March 2017, Glass announced on This American Life that he and Alani had separated, and in an interview later that year, specified that they had been separating over the previous three years. On April 17, 2017, Glass reportedly filed for divorce. According to Glass, the pitbull contributed to the divorce. Glass resumed dating, calling it "kind of nice and sort of sweet," and saying, "[t]here's a lot of hope to it."

His older sister, Randi Glass Murray, is a literary agent based in San Francisco, while his younger sister, Karen Glass Barry, was a senior vice president in film development at Disney Studios. He is a first cousin once removed of composer Philip Glass, who has appeared on Glass's show and whose music can often be heard on the program.

Glass has donated to Prison Performing Arts and dedicated a whole episode of This American Life around one of the organization's productions of Hamlet.

Glass decided to become a vegetarian after visiting United Poultry Concerns' chicken sanctuary.

Glass likes the shows Gilmore Girls and Family Guy, and says he never missed an episode of The O.C. His favorite podcasts include WTF with Marc Maron, The Daily, Reply All, Radiolab, Heavyweight, Stay Tuned with Preet."

=== Religion ===
Glass has stated on This American Life that he is a staunch atheist. "It's not like I don't feel like I'm a Jew," he explained. "I feel like I don't have a choice about being a Jew. Your cultural heritage isn't like a suitcase you can lose at the airport...But even when I was 14 or 15, it didn't make that much sense to me that there was this Big Daddy who created the world and would act so crazy in the Old Testament. That we made up these stories to make ourselves feel good and explain the world seems like a much more reasonable explanation. I've tried to believe in God but I simply don't." Atheism aside, he said, "Some years I have a nostalgic feeling to go into a shul and I'll go in for a High Holiday service. Rabbi Seymour Essrog was really funny, a great storyteller. He was so good that even the kids would stay and watch him. He'd tell a funny anecdote, something really moving, and go for a big finish. That's what the show is."

Glass has stated that "Christians get a really bad rap in the media" and that contrary to the way they are portrayed in pop-culture, the Christians in his life "were all incredibly wonderful and thoughtful".

== Awards ==
Glass was named the recipient of the Edward R. Murrow Award for Outstanding Contributions to Public Radio in 2009. In 2011, he earned the George Polk Award in Radio Reporting for "Very Tough Love", an hour-long report that showed alarmingly severe punishments being meted out by a county drug court judge in Georgia. The episode prompted Georgia's Judicial Qualifying Commission to file 14 ethical misconduct charges against Judge Amanda Williams and, within weeks, Williams stepped down from the bench and agreed never to seek other judicial offices.

In 2012, Glass was awarded a Doctorate of Humane Letters honoris causa from Goucher College in Baltimore. In May 2013, Glass received the Medal for Spoken Language from the American Academy of Arts and Letters. He was on the team that won the Gold Award for best documentary from the Third Coast International Audio Festival in 2013 for Harper High School, and was inducted into the National Radio Hall of Fame in November 2014.

In 2020, Glass and the rest of the This American Life staff (together with Molly O'Toole of the Los Angeles Times and Emily Green of Vice News) won the inaugural Pulitzer Prize for Audio Reporting for the episode "The Out Crowd," which demonstrated "revelatory, intimate journalism that illuminates the personal impact of the Trump Administration's "Remain in Mexico" policy".
