= C. Justin Brown =

American criminal defense attorney

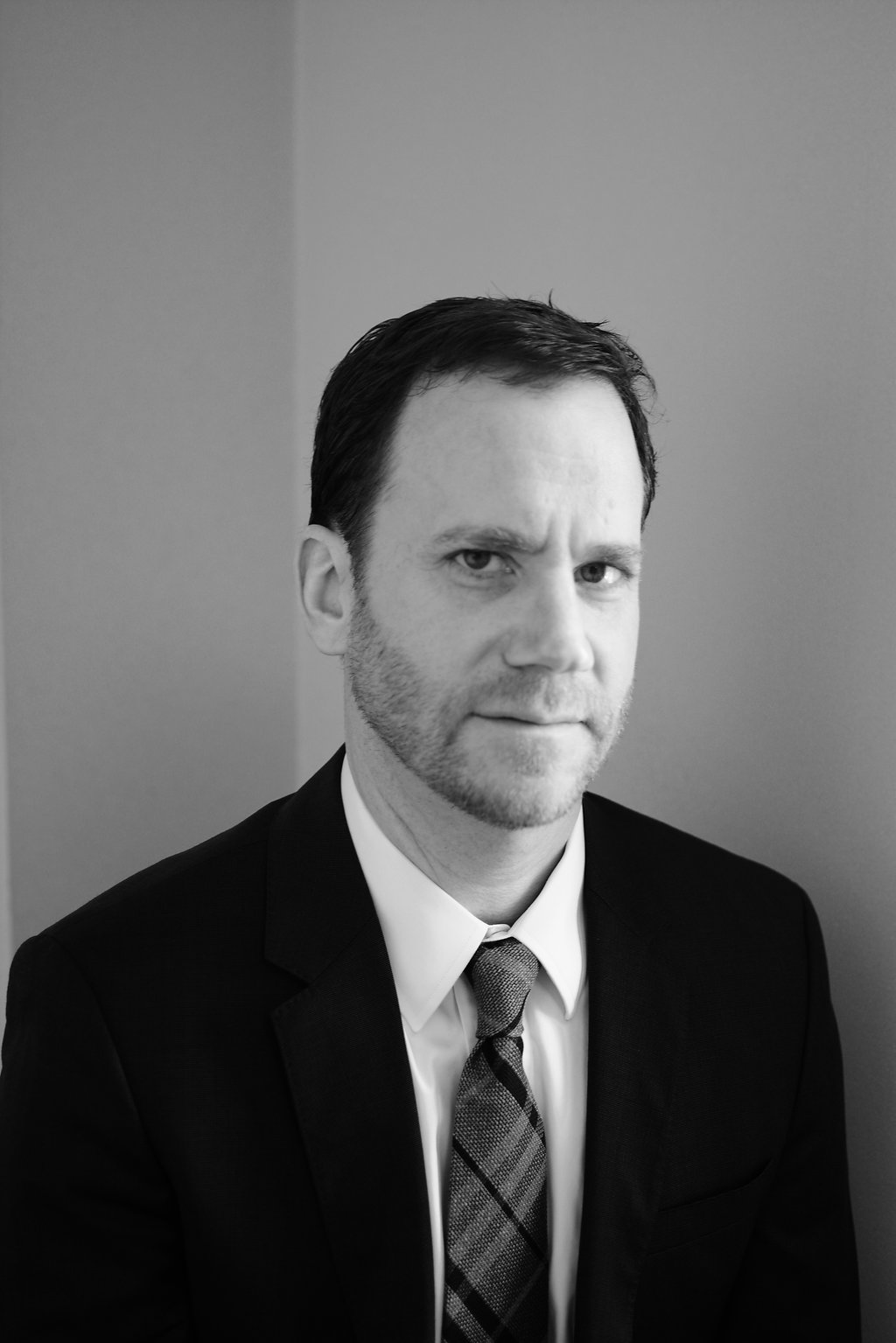
- Brown in 2016
- Born: Baltimore, Maryland, U.S.
- Education: Cornell University (AB); University of Maryland (JD)
- Occupation: Criminal Defense Attorney
- Website: http://cjbrownlaw.com/

C. Justin Brown is an American criminal defense attorney based in Baltimore, Maryland. He runs a law firm called Brown Law. He formerly represented Adnan Syed, who was convicted of murder in the 1999 killing of Hae Min Lee and was the subject of the first season of the podcast Serial in 2014.

== Early life and education ==
Brown grew up in Baltimore and attended the Gilman School. He graduated from Cornell University in 1992, and went to the University of Maryland School of Law, where he graduated with honors. He was an editor on the Maryland Law Review. After law school, Brown clerked for Judge Andre M. Davis (retired) in the United States District Court for the District of Maryland.

== Journalism career ==
Prior to becoming a lawyer, Brown was a journalist whose work was published in numerous outlets, including The Baltimore Sun, The New York Times, Newsweek, the Associated Press, The Christian Science Monitor, Details, and Maxim. He covered the war in Kosovo from 1997 to 1999.

== Legal career ==
=== Representation of Adnan Syed ===
Syed was convicted in 2000 of murdering his ex-girlfriend, Hae Min Lee. At the time, both Syed and Lee were high school seniors at Woodlawn High School in Baltimore County, Maryland. Syed received a sentence of life imprisonment, plus 30 years. His conviction was overturned by Baltimore City prosecutors in 2022 and all charges against him were dropped.

Brown started representing Syed in 2009 and was his lead attorney until 2019. Brown represented Syed in his second post-conviction hearing, which commenced on February 3, 2016, and lasted for five days. On June 30, 2016, Judge Martin Welch, of the Circuit Court for Baltimore City, granted Syed a new trial based on ineffective assistance of counsel when trial counsel, Cristina Gutierrez, failed to cross examine a State’s witness with a fax cover sheet pertaining to cell phone records. The State of Maryland appealed the granting of the new trial and the case proceeded to the Maryland Court of Special Appeals. On March 29, 2018, by a 2 to 1 decision, the Court of Special Appeals reversed the lower court’s ruling on the cell phone records issue, but upheld the grant of a new trial based on Gutierrez’ failure to contact alibi witness Asia McClain. The State appealed a second time, to the Court of Appeals of Maryland, and on March 9, 2019, Syed's conviction was reinstated. Syed's conviction was again vacated on September 19, 2022.

=== Representation of Guled Omar ===
Brown also represents Guled Omar, the Minnesota man who, in 2016, was convicted for attempting to join ISIS. Brown is currently appealing Omar's case on the grounds that trial counsel failed to negotiate a plea agreement on behalf of Omar.

=== Project 6 ===
In 2021, Brown founded Project 6, a nonprofit organization based in Baltimore, Maryland. Project 6 serves prisoners who are seeking various forms of relief including post-conviction, sentence modification, innocence claims, and parole. Project 6 screens and investigates prisoners' cases and matches them with qualified pro bono attorneys.

== Professional recognition and publications ==
Brown has been recognized as a Super Lawyer each year since 2015. In 2016, The Daily Record named him an “Influential Marylander.”

== Other ==
Brown's father, C. Christopher Brown, is a retired civil rights attorney who founded the law firm Brown, Goldstein & Levy, and formerly was the lead counsel for the American Civil Liberties Union of Maryland.
