= Cristina Gutierrez =

American criminal defense attorney (1951–2004)

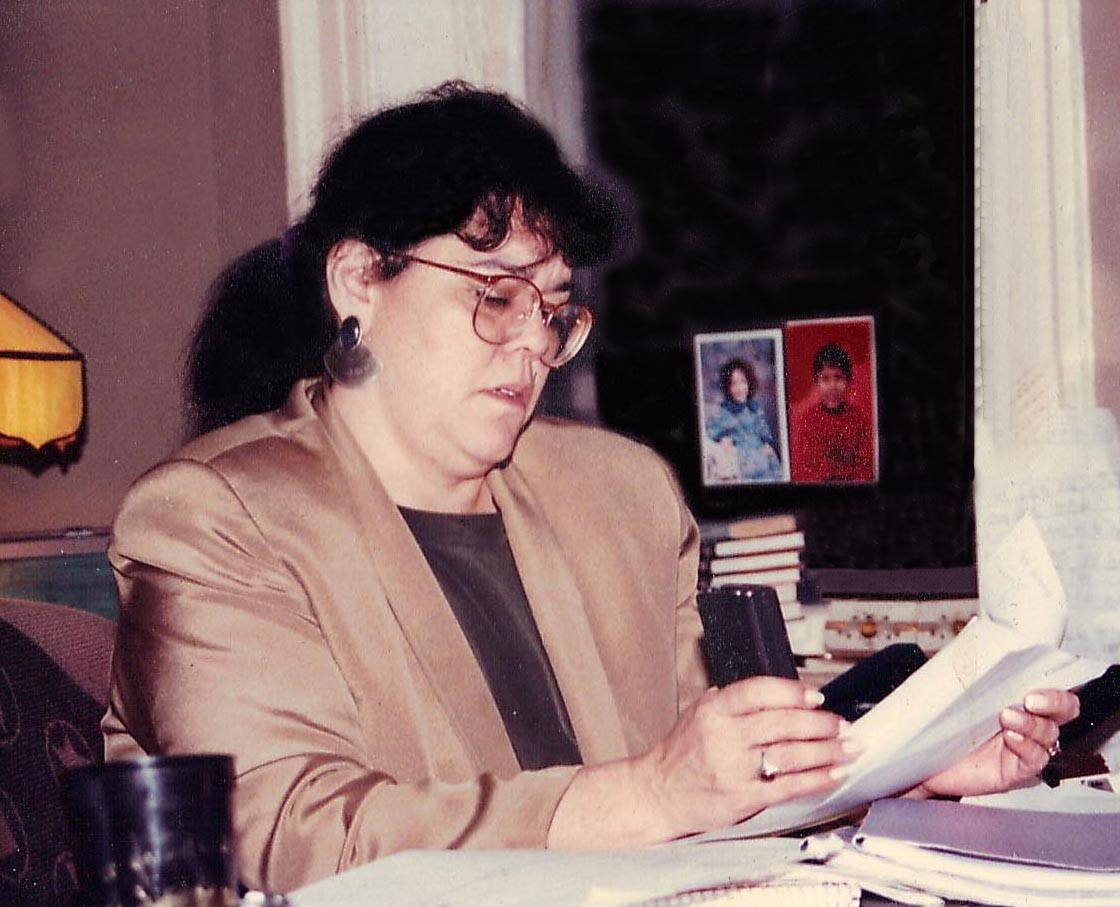
- Gutierrez in 1988
- Born: Maria Cristina Gutierrez; February 28, 1951; Maryland, U.S.
- Died: January 30, 2004 (aged 52); Towson, Maryland
- Education: Antioch College; University of Baltimore (J.D)
- Occupation: Criminal defense attorney
- Known for: High-profile defense attorney
- Children: Roberto Gutierrez; Micajuela Gutierrez

Maria Cristina Gutierrez (February 28, 1951 – January 30, 2004) was an American criminal defense attorney based in Baltimore, Maryland, who represented several high-profile defendants in the 1990s. She was the first Latina to be counsel of record in a case before the Supreme Court of the United States. In 2001, Gutierrez was disbarred, with her consent, following multiple complaints from clients who paid her for legal work she failed to perform. At the time, Gutierrez was dying from a combination of multiple sclerosis and diabetes, and her health was rapidly deteriorating.

She served as trial counsel for Adnan Syed, the Baltimore-area teenager who was convicted in 2000 of murdering his ex-girlfriend, Hae Min Lee, and sentenced to life in prison. The controversial case gained renewed national attention in 2014 after being the subject of the first season of the podcast Serial.

In a post-conviction hearing, a judge ruled that Gutierrez "rendered ineffective assistance".

== Background ==
Gutierrez attended high school at Notre Dame Prep in Baltimore, Maryland. She received her undergraduate degree from Antioch College and her juris doctor from the University of Baltimore School of Law. She was appointed as an attorney to the Office of the Public Defender in Baltimore and later joined the firm of Murphy and Associates, headed by William H. Murphy, Jr., former judge of the Baltimore City Circuit court who was to become one of Baltimore's leading criminal defense and civil rights trial lawyers.

== Legal career ==
Gutierrez graduated from the University of Baltimore School of Law in 1980 and began her career with the Office of the Public Defender in Baltimore after a brief clerkship with then Judge William H. Murphy, Jr. After several years she left the PD's office and joined the firm of William H. Murphy, Jr. and Associates. By most accounts, Gutierrez was a tenacious attorney, representing many individuals who appeared to have hopeless cases.

In 1986 Jamal Craig, an employee of his mother's day-care facility in Howard County, was charged with child abuse. Gutierrez represented Craig, and he was acquitted of all charges. His mother, Sandra Craig, had also been charged with child abuse. Gutierrez joined her trial team. Ms. Craig was convicted following a trial at which the child complainant was allowed to testify by closed-circuit television. The Maryland Court of Appeals reversed her conviction under the Confrontation Clause, but the Supreme Court of the United States, in 1990, overturned that ruling by 5–4 vote in Maryland v. Craig. Gutierrez was co-counsel at the Supreme Court with her partner, Billy Murphy, who argued the case. Despite the setback at the Supreme Court, Murphy and Gutierrez continued to fight for their client, and following another appeal she was entirely vindicated.

Gutierrez represented Mickey Bowie, identical twin brother of Carl Jonathan Bowie, a 19-year-old Columbia, Maryland teen found hanged May 4, 1990 on a baseball backstop at Columbia's Oakland Mills High School. Prior to his death, Carl Jonathan Bowie and Mickey Bowie stated that they had been harassed by police officers after filing brutality complaints against three officers. The brothers said that the officers used excessive force in arresting them at a party at the Red Roof Inn in Jessup, Maryland in January 1990, 5 months prior to Bowie's death and weeks before they were to face police in court.

Although the state medical examiner ruled the death of Carl Jonathan Bowie a suicide, many of his relatives and friends have disputed that finding and have suggested that his death was the result of foul play. Howard County police first ruled the death a suicide and later reclassified it as an unattended death. Subsequent investigations by the state police and a county grand jury found no evidence of foul play in the death but insufficient evidence of suicide. Gutierrez stated it is "extraordinarily improper for the State's Attorney's Office to declare that officers are 'magically cleared' of complicity in Bowie's death" and vowed to prove that the State's Attorney's Office acted improperly. Gutierrez involvement in the Bowie case is presented in the 2020 true crime book Losing Jon.

Gutierrez represented a female Baltimore police officer who was accused of first-degree murder after shooting her husband six times. Gutierrez developed a "battered spouse syndrome" defense and her client was convicted only of the lesser second-degree murder charge.

Gutierrez also represented Jacqueline Bouknight, a Baltimore woman who had been held in contempt of court for not revealing the whereabouts of her son to state social services officials. They suspected that the child had been killed, although no homicide charges were ever filed. Bouknight refused to disclose what she knew about her son's disappearance, relying on her Fifth Amendment privilege. In 1990, the Supreme Court of the United States ruled against her, but Bouknight, counseled by Gutierrez, maintained her refusal. As a result, she spent over seven years in jail for contempt, but thereby avoided the risk of a life sentence that might have resulted if charged with and convicted of murder in reliance on her compelled testimony.

In 1993 Gutierrez was made a partner in the firm, and its name was changed to Murphy and Gutierrez. On January 15, 1995, The Baltimore Sun reported that Murphy and Gutierrez split, with Gutierrez describing the decision as amicable. This however, was later contradicted by Gutierrez to the court in an appeal case for John Merzbacher, her client at that time. "Gutierrez states 'On January 15, without planning whatsoever, I was forced to move my law office, literally overnight. And that created a burden on me".

=== Representation of Adnan Syed ===
On February 9, 1999, the body of Hae Min Lee (Korean: 이해민), an 18-year-old student at Woodlawn High School in Baltimore, Maryland, was found in Leakin Park. Lee's ex-boyfriend, Adnan Syed, was arrested on February 28, 1999, and charged with first-degree murder. His family retained Gutierrez to represent their son. Syed's first trial ended in a mistrial, when Judge William Quarles called Gutierrez a "liar" in earshot of the jury. After a six-week second trial, Syed was found guilty of Lee's murder on February 25, 2000 and sentenced to life in prison, although he continued to maintain his innocence.

Syed's new attorney, C. Justin Brown, appealed the case on the basis of mistakes made by Gutierrez prior to and during the trial. Brown says that Gutierrez failed to interview several alibi witnesses, including Asia McClain, who was with Syed at the time Lee was killed. Syed's case was declined a hearing from the U.S. Supreme Court in 2019, and he was released in September 2022.

In February 2015, the Maryland Court of Special Appeals filed a decision allowing Syed to appeal his conviction on multiple grounds of ineffective assistance of counsel by Gutierrez.

On November 6, 2015, "Baltimore City Circuit Court Judge Martin Welch ordered that Syed's post-conviction proceedings would be re-opened 'in the interests of justice for all parties.'" Following a February 2016 hearing, during which Asia McClain and colleagues and friends of Gutierrez testified, Judge Welch granted Syed's request for a new trial on June 30, 2016, ruling that Gutierrez "rendered ineffective assistance when she failed to cross-examine the state's expert regarding the reliability of cell tower location evidence", and vacated Syed's conviction.

=== Disbarment ===
On May 24, 2001, the Maryland Court of Appeals announced Gutierrez had been disbarred. Gutierrez had agreed to the disbarment, citing numerous health problems including multiple sclerosis (MS). In light of the voluntary disbarment, the state's Attorney Grievance Commission dropped investigations into about a dozen client complaints that they had paid for work which Gutierrez had not completed. By mid-July the Maryland Clients' Security Trust Fund had received some 20 claims totaling $226,493 from former clients. "I believe this is our all-time record", said Janet C. Moss, the fund's administrator.

== Death ==
According to her son Roberto, Gutierrez had begun experiencing the effects of MS in 1999, complicated by diabetes. She started to lose her vision and memory. By 2003, she was using a wheelchair and couldn't remember her son's name. She died on January 30, 2004, in Towson, Maryland, following a heart attack.
