= Undisclosed =

Undisclosed may refer to:

- Undisclosed (podcast), a 2015–2022 American podcast about wrongful convictions
- "Undisclosed Desires", or "Undisclosed", a 2009 song by Muse
