= Tavon =

Tavon may refer to:

- Tavon Austin (born 1990), American football player
- Tavon Rooks (born 1990), American football player
- Tavon Wilson (born 1990), American football player
- Tavon Young (born 1994), American football player
