= Rabia Chaudry =

Attorney and author

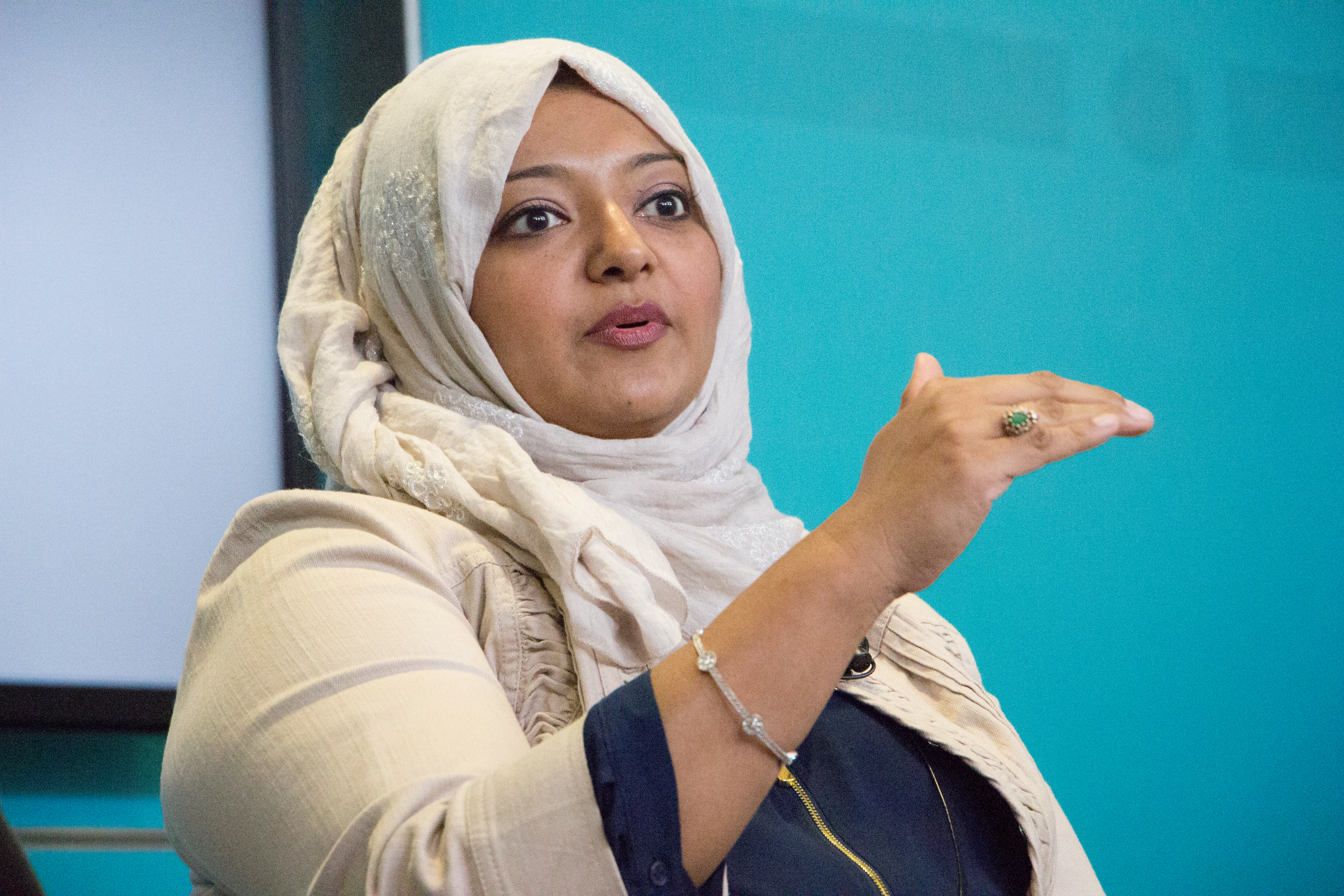
- Born: Lahore, Pakistan
- Education: University of Maryland, Baltimore County (BA); George Mason University Antonin Scalia Law School (JD)
- Occupations: Lawyer and author
- Known for: Advocacy for Adnan Syed; Undisclosed
- Website: Website

Rabia Chaudry (Urdu: رابعہ چودھری) is a Pakistani-American attorney, author and podcast host. She is a family friend of Adnan Syed—who was the subject of the podcast Serial (2014)—and subsequently wrote a book about his case called Adnan’s Story: The Search for Truth and Justice After Serial (2016), which became a New York Times best seller. Chaudry co-hosts several podcasts, namely Undisclosed, a podcast on Syed's case and others.

== Early life ==
Chaudry was born in Pakistan. She attended the University of Maryland, Baltimore County and the George Mason University School of Law.

== Career ==
Chaudry, a childhood friend of Adnan Syed, was the first person to take his case to radio producer and host Sarah Koenig; on the 2014 podcast Serial, Koenig documented her investigation into Chaudry’s contention that Syed had been wrongly convicted of killing Hae Min Lee. Chaudry subsequently wrote a book about the case called Adnan’s Story: The Search for Truth and Justice After Serial (St. Martin Press, September 2016). Molly Fitzgerald writes in Bustle that the book "picks up where ‘Serial’ left off," describing evidence not included in the Serial podcast including letters he wrote to his family early in his imprisonment. Reviewing the book for the Los Angeles Times, Jessica Roy wrote, “It was easy to forget, listening to ‘Serial,’ that it was a true story about real people. ‘Adnan’s Story’ adds context and humanizes it in a way that could change how you think about the case, and about ‘Serial’ itself.” Adnan's Story became a New York Times best-seller and one of Audible's 10 most popular audio books of 2016.

Chaudry hosts several podcasts. She co-hosts Undisclosed with Susan Simpson and Colin Miller, a podcast that looks at evidence in Syed's case, the case of Joey Watkins, and others. She co-hosts Rabia and Ellyn Solve the Case, co-hosted with Ellyn Marie Marsh, a true-crime podcast. She also co-hosts The Mystery Hour, Nighty Night with Rabia Chaudry, The 45th, and The Hidden Djinn.

Chaudry has been a fellow at the US Institute of Peace and at the New America Foundation. She is founder and president of the Safe Nation Collaborative, a project that offers education on Islamic faith, dialogue between law enforcement and Muslim communities, and countering violent extremism.

== Works ==
- Adnan's Story: the search for truth and justice after Serial. New York City: St. Martin's Press. 2016. ISBN 9781250087102.
- Fatty fatty boom boom : a memoir of food, fat, and family. New York City: Algonquin Books of Chapel Hill. 2022. ISBN 9781643750385.
