= Final Witness =

- Genre: Documentary; Crime drama
- Directed by: Adam Feinstein; Rudy Bednar; Alrick Brown; Cruz Angeles; Mora Stephens
- Country of origin: United States
- Original language: English
- No. of seasons: 1
- No. of episodes: 7

Production
- Executive producers: Rudy Bednar; Christine Connor
- Producer: Lee Beckett
- Cinematography: Andreas Burgess; Paul Marschall; Khalid Mohtaseb
- Production company: Lincoln Square Productions

Original release
- Network: ABC
- Release: June 27 – August 8, 2012

Final Witness is an American crime drama television series that premiered on June 27, 2012, on ABC.

The seven-part series, which combines documentary and drama elements, focuses on a different real-life murder each week from the victim's point of view. Each episode includes interviews with the victim's family and friends, real witnesses, prosecutors, and law enforcement officers, as well as scripted scenes with actors.

== Episodes ==
No.	Title	Directed by	Original release date	Prod. code	U.S. viewers (millions)
1	"The Kids Aren't Alright"	Rudy Bednar & Adam Feinstein	June 27, 2012	101	4.21
On March 1, 2008 Tommy Gaston is awakened by a noise on his front porch. Upon opening his front door, he finds his neighbor Terry Caffey, who had been shot five times and is near death. Terry is able to tell him that his wife and children were dead – shot by two intruders of their home. Tommy looks in the direction of the Caffey home and sees a fiery glow. Terry confirms that his house is burning and he knows who the intruders are that killed his family. Daughter Erin and her boyfriend Charles Wilkinson had come up with a plan to be together by killing her forbidding family.
2	"Graveyard Love"	Adam Feinstein	July 4, 2012	102	4.88
On October 17, 2006, New Orleans police respond to a 9-1-1 call from the Omni Hotel – someone has fallen to their death. They arrive to find a young man's body with a note that says: "This is not an accident. I had to take my own life to pay for the one I took." A year earlier, in the French Quarter, Addie Hall, a free-spirited dance teacher, met Zack Bowen, a talented musician/bartender who had served with the Army in wars in Kosovo and Iraq. The two fell in love just weeks before Hurricane Katrina. The two chose to remain in the city, thinking they would survive the oncoming storm, but they could not survive their own troubled pasts. Zack's suicide note directs the police to an address in the French Quarter, where they find Addie's dismembered body. Zach had strangled her to death nearly two weeks earlier. On the walls near her body, he had spray-painted pleas for help with his pain and his "total failure".
3	"Fatal Devotion"	Adam Feinstein	July 11, 2012	103	4.29
On December 19, 2001, police find the body of an unidentified boy in a river in Waldport, Oregon. A woman calls the police and tells them the boy's name is Zachery and that she knows the family. The police continue the investigation and find suitcases filled with the bodies of MaryJane Longo and daughters Sadie and Madison. Unknown to MaryJane and their children, husband and father Christian had been committing check fraud and stolen industrial equipment sales. His lies are discovered by his wife and he kills his entire family. The FBI tracks him to Mexico, where he is posing as a reporter for The New York Times, and arrest him.
4	"Vixen's Elixir"	Alrick Brown	July 18, 2012	104	4.28
In 1995, a cop named Glenn Turner dies in DeKalb County, Georgia suddenly and unexpectedly from a heart failure. He was married to Lynn Turner, who began having an affair with Atlanta firefighter Randy Thompson. Glenn plans to divorce her, but dies before doing so. Lynn later marries and has children with Randy, but he later died as well. The autopsy results revealed that the deaths were linked – Lynn used chemicals in Jell-O fed to Glen and the ice tea drank by Randy. Imprisoned for these murders, she committed suicide while in jail.
5	"The Devil You Know"	Mora Stephens	July 25, 2012	105	3.97
In Springfield, Illinois in 1995, Donnah Winger and her adopted baby girl were harassed on the way home by airport shuttle driver Roger Harrington. A few days later, Donnah's husband Mark calls the police to say that he has killed a man who had been beating on her with a hammer. At first, Mark did not know him, but later recognized his name – Roger Harrington. The case was closed within 48 hours, however it was reopened four years later when Donnah's friend and Mark's mistress Deanne Schultz confessed that Mark wished Donnah was dead because she was unable to bear children. Mark had remarried and had his own children plus the adopted baby girl. Mark was arrested as police believed that Mark baited Harrington to his home, shot him, and used the hammer on his wife. In 2002, he received a life sentence for the two murders, and in 2007 received an additional 35 years in jail for soliciting a fellow inmate to murder Schultz and five others.
6	"A Mother's Revenge"	Cruz Angeles	August 1, 2012	106	2.56
Human remains are discovered in an Ohio cornfield. Police initially cannot identify the body as it is covered with lime. Looking into previous missing persons' reports, they see where Lora Eberhard reported her 20-year-old son, Andrew Dotson, missing five weeks ago. Dental records confirm that the remains are his. Andrew, along with his mother and step-father, had recently moved to Franklin County, Ohio, as did Andrew's craving for acceptance. Jimmy Conway and his misfit group had taken in Andrew. While the police investigation stalls, Lora uncovers multiple shootings, gang rivalries, and contract killings committed by the group. Jimmy Conway was convicted and sentenced to death for the murder of Andrew. The decision was upheld by the Supreme Court of Ohio and the United States Supreme Court did not overturn that decision. Conway continues to maintain his innocence in that murder and has filed an appeal in federal court.
7	"What the Boy Saw"	Rudy Bednar	August 8, 2012	107	2.81
On September 3, 2006 Nina Reiser did not arrive for a dinner date with friend Ellen Risen. When Nina did not pick her kids up from school the next day, Ellen became concerned. Five days later, Nina's minivan was found abandoned, with her purse, cell phone, and groceries inside. Nina was missing. Born Nina Sharanova, the Russian beauty met American entrepreneur Hans Reiser in 1998. Their whirlwind romance led to marriage and starting a family in Oakland, California. Their marriage crumbled when Hans spent more time away from home on business, leaving Nina home to raise the kids and longing for a career. Seeking sole custody, she filed for divorce, which quickly became messy. Before the divorce can be resolved, she was murdered and her own son witnessed the crime. Hans was found guilty of first-degree murder but pleaded guilty to and was convicted of a reduced charge of second-degree murder, because he led investigators to Nina's body. On July 16, 2012 their children were awarded $60 million in wrongful death claim against him.

== U.S. Nielsen ratings ==
The following is a table for the United States ratings, based on average total estimated viewers per episode, of Final Witness on ABC.

No.	Title	U.S. air date	Rating	Share	Rating/share (18–49)	Viewers (millions)
1	"The Kids Aren't Alright"	June 27, 2012	2.9	5	1.0/3	4.21
2	"Graveyard Love"	July 4, 2012	2.0	4	0.5/2	4.88
3	"Fatal Devotion"	July 11, 2012	2.9	5	1.1/3	4.29
4	"Vixen's Elixir"	July 18, 2012	2.7	5	1.2/4	4.28
5	"The Devil You Know"	July 25, 2012	2.7	5	1.0/3	3.97
6	"A Mother's Revenge"	August 1, 2012	1.8	3	0.7/2	2.56
7	"What the Boy Saw"	August 8, 2012	1.8	3	0.8/2	2.81

== Critical reception ==
The series received mixed reviews from critics. Jessica Shaw of Entertainment Weekly stated that "Crime reenactments are equal parts disturbing and cheesy – mediocre actors portraying cold-blooded killers and their victims. This new ripped-from-the-headlines series amps up the cheese even further by mixing Desperate Housewives-style narration with actual non-reenacted interviews." The New York Post's Linda Stasi called the series "a good true-crime show. A very good true-crime show. But that voice-from-beyond narrator is just so very wrong." Verne Gay of Newsday also commented on the narration by writing that the series is "a grim, macabre march through a terrible crime, deploying a bad twist – the voice of the deceased." The New York Daily News' David Hinckley thought the series was "crisply and professionally produced. But the best face it can put on terrible murder cases is philosophical, and that may not be enough to keep viewers from the somber takeaway that someone they like has ended up dead."
