= Joan Cassis =

American photographer (1952–1996)

- Born: September 10, 1952
- Died: April 28, 1996 (aged 43); Hampden, Maryland
- Known for: photography

Joan Cassis (September 10, 1952 – April 28, 1996) was an American photographer known for her black and white portraiture work. She often colored black and white photos with oil paints, blending photography and painting.

== Early life ==
Joan Cassis was born on September 10, 1952. A Maryland native, she was raised in Woodmoor and attended Woodlawn High School, graduating in 1970.

== Career ==
Cassis went on to attend Maryland Institute College of Art and graduated in 1974. After college, she worked as a municipal government photographer before embarking on a free-lance photography career. In addition to photography she had a career as an art therapist and educator.

Cassis's work primarily centered around black and white photography, using the gelatin silver print process. She was noted for her portraits and for her use of oil paints to hand-color her photographs.

Her photographs were exhibited in galleries in the United States, as well as in Athens and Amsterdam.

Photographs by Cassis are in the collections of the Portland Art Museum, The Nelson-Atkins Museum of Art, the Smithsonian American Art Museum, the National Gallery of Art, the Boston Museum of Fine Arts, the Museum of Fine Arts, Houston, and the National Museum of Women in the Arts.

== Death ==
Joan Cassis died at the age of 43 on April 28, 1996, of an aneurysm. She lived in Hampden.
