= The Improvement Association =

Podcast about voter fraud

- Genre: Investigative journalism; Serialized audio narrative
- Language: English

Cast and voices
- Hosted by: Zoe Chace

Music
- Theme music composed by: Kwame Brandt-Pierce

Production
- Production: Nancy Updike
- Editing: Julie Snyder; Sarah Koenig; Neil Drumming; Ira Glass
- Length: 3h 21m

Technical specifications
- Audio format: Podcast (via streaming or downloadable MP3)

Publication
- No. of seasons: 1
- No. of episodes: 5
- Original release: March 30 – March 30, 2021

Related
- Website: Link to NYT Podcast

The Improvement Association is a podcast hosted by Zoe Chace. The podcast is produced by Serial Productions, which is owned by The New York Times. The podcast consists of five episodes and debuted on April 13, 2021. The podcast focuses on the 2018 North Carolina's 9th congressional district election and the voter fraud that occurred that year.

== Awards ==
Award	Date	Category	Result	Ref.
Peabody Awards	2022	Podcast & Radio	Nominated	
