= Killer Women with Piers Morgan =

British television documentary series

- Genre: Documentary
- Directed by: Stuart Cabb
- Starring: Piers Morgan
- Country of origin: United Kingdom
- No. of seasons: 2

Production
- Producer: Lisa Keane
- Running time: 60 minutes

Original release
- Network: ITV

Killer Women with Piers Morgan is a British television documentary series, broadcast on ITV and consisting of interviews by Piers Morgan with convicted American women murderers. The first series, of two episodes, was broadcast in May 2016, and the second series began its run in June 2017.

== Overview ==
Among those interviewed in the first series was Erin Caffey, whose boyfriend Charlie Wilkinson and his friend Charles Wade shot and stabbed her mother and two brothers to death in 2008. In the second series Morgan interviewed Rebecca Fenton, who murdered her husband; and Amber Wright, who took part in the murder of her teenage boyfriend.

== Episodes ==
=== Season 1 ===
- S01E01 - Erin Caffey: Piers travels to Gatesville, Texas to meet Erin Caffey who, at the age of 16, masterminded the brutal murder of her entire family.
- S01E02 - Amanda Lewis/Rhonda Glover: A mother is accused by her 7-year-old son of drowning her own daughter. Piers also talks to a beauty queen accused of killing her wealthy lover in Austin, Texas.

=== Season 2 ===
- S02E01 - Rebecca Fenton: In spite of her conviction, she denies murdering her husband, Larry, on Super Bowl XLII in Clearwater, Florida. Piers seeks to find out the truth.
- S02E02 - Amber Wright: Every teenager deals with the fallout from a romantic breakup, but few go to the lengths of 15-year-old Amber Wright who lured her former partner Seath Jackson to his death in Belleview, Florida.
- S02E03 - Jennifer Mee: She first gained fame as the "Hiccup Girl". She is now serving a life sentence even though she didn't pull the trigger and wasn't even at the scene when the bullets that killed a young man, Shannon Griffin, were fired.
- S02E04 - Ashley Humphrey: She stalked her victim Sandra Rozzo, a woman she did not even know with murder on her mind. After shooting her point blank 8 times, Ashley is now serving 25 years.
- S02E05 - Sheila Davalloo: For 14 years, she has remained silent about the events surrounding the murder of Anna Lisa Raymundo in Stamford, Connecticut. But in an exclusive first-ever interview, Piers will get the chance sit face to face with her and drill down into what really happened.

== Reception ==
The Guardian, while judging Morgan to be a "good interviewer", doubted the real value of the series.
