= Undisclosed (podcast) =

True crime podcast

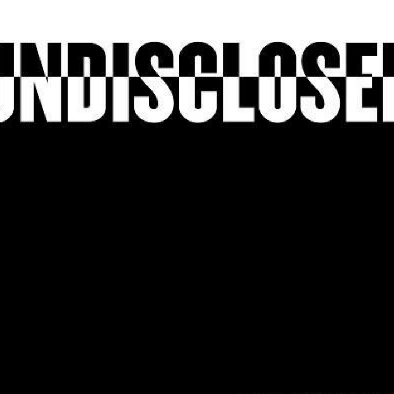
- Genre: true crime
- Language: English

Creative team
- Created by: Rabia Chaudry; Susan Simpson; Colin Miller

Cast and voices
- Hosted by: Rabia Chaudry; Susan Simpson; Colin Miller

Production
- Production: Undisclosed, LLC

Publication
- No. of seasons: 24
- Original release: April 12, 2015

Related
- Website: www.undisclosedpod.com

Undisclosed is a podcast about wrongful convictions in the United States. Each season, the hosts do a deep dive investigation into a possible wrongful conviction and explore options for appeal. It is created and hosted by Rabia Chaudry, Susan Simpson, and Colin Miller. The podcast started by investigating the conviction of Adnan Syed for the killing of Hae Min Lee, which had previously been the focus of the first season of the podcast Serial.

Season two focused on the Georgia conviction of Joey Watkins for the murder of Isaac Dawkins in Rome Georgia. According to the podcast, Watkins's cell phone records proved that he could not have committed the murder. The podcast uncovered that a juror who initially believed Watkins was not guilty did a misguided drive test to try to see whether Watkins could have committed the crime. This new information ultimately formed the basis for Watkins's conviction being reversed and his release from prison.

The most recent season of the podcast, in the fall of 2025, covered the case of Amanda Lewis, a mother convicted of drowning her daughter.

== Undisclosed LLC v. State ==
Undisclosed wanted to copy the tapes from the Watkins trial, which they wanted to play so that listeners could hear Watkins saying he was innocent. The court initially agreed, then changed its mind before they actually copied the tapes. This led to further litigation, with the Georgia Supreme Court eventually ruling that the state did not have to allow Undisclosed to copy the tapes.

== Seasons ==
Undisclosed has covered many cases over twenty-four seasons, but there are occasionally bonus episodes, addendum episodes, updates, or episodes between seasons.

Season titles

- Season One: The State v. Adnan Syed; Case Summary: In 2000, Adnan was convicted of the 1999 murder of Hae Min Lee in Baltimore, Maryland. Result: On March 6, 2025, Judge Jennifer Schiffer reduced Adnan's sentence to time served plus five years of probation under Maryland's Juvenile Restoration Act.
- Season Two: The State v. Joey Watkins; Case Summary: In 2001, Joey was convicted of the 2000 murder of Isaac Dawkins in Rome, Georgia. Result: On April 11, 2022, Judge Don Thompson granted Joey's habeas corpus petition and overturned his conviction, finding that a juror's unauthorized drive test caused him actual prejudice.
- Season Three: The State v. Jamar Huggins; Case Summary: In 2015, Jamar was convicted of first-degree burglary, kidnapping and armed robbery in connection with a 2014 home invasion in Conway, South Carolina. The only real witness against him was DeAngula Montgomery, who told the police that Jamar took part in the home invasion with her but then testified at trial that he was not involved. Result: Jamar is currently litigating an ineffective assistance of counsel claim based on DeAngula Montgomery's post-trial affidavit in which she named the true perpetrator of the crime.
- Season Four: The Killing of Freddie Gray. Series examining the case of Freddie Gray, who died from injuries sustained while in the Baltimore police in April 2015.
- Season Five: The State v. Gary Mitchum Reeves Series looking back at the case of Gary Mitchum Reeves, who was paroled in 1981, six years into his life sentence for the murder of his live in girlfriend.
- Season Six: The State v. Shaurn Thomas; Case Summary: In 1994, Shaurn was convicted of the 1990 murder of Domingo Martinez in Philadelphia. Result: In 2017, a judge vacated Shaurn's conviction based on alibi evidence that he was in court at the time of the murder. In 2020, Shaurn reached a settlement with the City of Philadelphia for $4.1 million for 24 years of wrongful conviction.
- Season Seven: The State v. Willie Veasy; Case Summary: In 1993, Willie was convicted of the 1992 murder of John Lewis in Philadelphia. Result: On October 9, 2019, Judge Leon Tucker vacated Willie's conviction based in part on Patricia Cummings, the head of the Conviction Integrity Unit, filing a motion stating that Willie was "likely innocent." In August 2021, Willie settled with the City of Philadelphia for $5 million for his 27 years of wrongful conviction.
- Season Eight: The State v. Terrance Lewis; Case Summary: In 1999, Terrance was convicted of the 1996 murder of Hulon Howard in Philadelphia. Result: In May 2019, Judge Barbara McDermott reversed Terrance's conviction and declared him innocent. On June 30, 2020, Terrance reached a settlement with the City of Philadelphia for $6.25 million for his 21 years of wrongful conviction.
- Season Nine: The State v. Chester Holman III; Case Summary: In 1993, Chester was convicted of the 1991 murder of Tae Jung Ho in Philadelphia. Result: On July 15, 2019, Judge Gwendolyn N. Bright ruled that Chester was "likely innocent" of the murder and reversed his conviction. The State then dropped all charges against him on July 30th. On December 30, 2020, Chester reached a settlement with the City of Philadelphia for $9.8 million for his 28 years of wrongful conviction.
- Season Ten: The State v. Ronnie Long; Case Summary: In 1976, Ronnie was convicted of the 1976 rape of Gray Bost and the burglary of her home in Concord, North Carolina. Result: In August, 2020, the United States District Court for the Eastern District of North Carolina vacated Ronnie convictions. In September 2020, Ronnie was released from prison. On December 17, 2020, North Carolina Governor Roy Cooper issued a Pardon of Innocence for Ronnie, making him eligible for $750,000 in compensation. On May 3, 2021, Ronnie filed a civil action, which he settled for $25 million in January 2024.
- Season Eleven: The State v. Pamela Lanier; Case Summary: In 1999, Pam was convicted of the 1997 murder of her husband, Dorian, in Duplin County. Result: In October 2025, Pam had a hearing on her Motion for Appropriate Relief where experts testified that the lethal level of arsenic in Dorian's system likely resulted from his self-ingestion of a turkey medication that was later recalled due to its arsenic content.
- Season Twelve: The State v. Dennis Perry; Case Summary: In 2003, Dennis was convicted of the 1985 murders of Harold and Thelma Swain in Waverly, Georgia. Result: In April 2020, glasses likely left at the crime scene by the killer had hairs with mitochondrial DNA linking them to someone in the maternal line of alternate suspect Erik Sparre. On July 13, 2020, a hearing on Dennis’s motion for extraordinary relief was held, resulting in Dennis being granted a new trial. On July 23, 2020, Dennis was released from prison. Legislators in Georgia later passed legislation that paid Dennis $1.23 million. Subsequently, in December 2024, Erik Sparre was arrested for the murders of Harold and Thelma Swain.
- Season Thirteen: The Case Against Adnan Syed. A revisit of the Adnan Syed case.
- Season Fourteen: The State v. Keith Davis, Jr.; Case Summary: Keith was prosecuted four times for the 2015 murder of Kevin Jones in Baltimore, Maryland. Each of these trials resulted in a reversal or hung jury. Result: In January 2023, the Baltimore City State's Attorney dismissed all charges against Keith, finding that the prior State's Attorney had made "prosecutorial missteps" in "her pursuit of a conviction at all costs."
- Season Fifteen: The State v. Rocky Myers; Case Summary: In 1993, Rocky was convicted of the 1991 murder of Ludie Mae Tucker in Decatur, Alabama. By a 9-3, the jury recommended a life sentence, but the judge used judicial override to impose a death sentence. Result: On February 28, 2025, Governor Kay Ivey commuted Rocky's death sentence to a life sentence, citing considerable questions about his guilt.
- Season Sixteen: The State v. Joseph Webster; Case Summary: In 2006, Joseph was convicted of the 1998 murder of Leroy Owens in Nashville, Tennessee. Result: A judge agreed with the Davidson County Conviction Review Unit that Joseph was wrongfully convicted, and he was released on November 10, 2020.
- Season Seventeen: The State v. Greg Lance; Case Summary: In 1999, Greg was convicted of the 1998 murders of Victor and Alla Kolesnikow in Cookeville, Tennessee. Result: Greg is currently appealing his convictions based on upon DNA testing and evidence regarding an alternate suspect.
- Season Eighteen: The State v. Fred Freeman; Case Summary: In 1987, Fred was convicted of the 1986 murder of Scott Macklem in Port Huron, Michigan. Result: In 2010, federal district court Judge Denise Hood overturned Fred's conviction, concluding that the prosecutor “engaged in misconduct by using a perjured testimony.” That ruling was later reversed, reinstating Fred's conviction. He is currently exploring appellate options.
- Season Nineteen: The State v. Jonathan Irons; Case Summary: In 1998, Jonathan was convicted of first degree assault, armed criminal action, and first degree burglary in connection with a home invasion in O'Fallon, Missouri. Result: Judge Daniel Green granted Jonathan a new trial based on a Brady violation, the Supreme Court of Missouri refused to hear the State’s appeal from that ruling on June 30, 2020. On July 1, 2020, Jonathan was released from prison. The following day, the prosecutor announced that he would not take Jonathan’s case back to trial. Jonathan was then released from prison.
- Season Twenty: The State v. John Brookins; Case Summary: In 1992, John was convicted of the 1990 murder of Sheila Ginsburg in Bucks County, Pennsylvania. Result: John is currently exploring appellate remedies, with a central focus on seeking DNA testing on crime scene evidence that could implicate a known alternate suspect.
- Season Twenty-One: The State v. Jeff Titus; Case Summary: In 2002, Jeff was convicted of the 1990 murders of Doug Estes and James Bennett in Kalamazoo County, Michigan. Result: On February 24, 2023, federal district court Judge Paul Borman granted Jeff's writ of habeas corpus and vacated his conviction. Prosecutors later dropped the charges against him. In September 2023, the state of Michigan agreed to pay Jeff $1.03 million for his 21 years of wrongful conviction.
- Season Twenty-Two: The State v. Darrell Ewing; Case Summary: In 2010, Darrell was convicted of the 2009 murder of J.B. Watson in Detroit, Michigan. Result: Darrell was granted a new trial based on jury misconduct, and the State ran out of appeals for that ruling on March 2, 2021. In March 2024, a Detroit judge dismissed the case against Darrell.
- Season Twenty-Three: The State v. Jason Carroll; Case Summary: In 1992, Jason was convicted of the 1988 murder of Sharon Johnson in Bedford, New Hampshire. Result: In 2023 and 2024, boxes of evidence of crime scene evidence were discovered. the State initially opposed DNA testing but later dropped their opposition. That testing has confirmed the presence of DNA, but the results of that testing have not yet been made public.
- Season Twenty-Four: The State v. Willis and Braddy; Case Summary: In 2000, Karl Willis and Wayne Braddy were convicted of the 1998 murder of Maurice Purifie in Toledo, Ohio. Result: In March 2023, while Karl and Wayne were appealing their convictions, the prosecutor offered them a plea deal pursuant to which they would enter Alford pleas in exchange for their immediate release from prison. Karl and Wayne accepted these deals and were released.
- Season Twenty-Five: The State v. Amanda Lewis; Case Summary: In 2008, Amanda was convicted of the 1997 murder of her daughter, Adrianna, in Esto, Florida. Result: On November 7, 2025, Amanda filed a Motion for Post-Conviction Relief asserting four alleged Constitutional violations uncovered as part of Undisclosed's investigation of the case.

== Bonus Episodes ==
Bonus Episodes

- Charles Ray Finch: Case Summary: In 1976, Charles was convicted of the 1976 murder of Shadow Holloman in North Carolina. Result: In May 2019, a federal judge reversed Charles's conviction, leading to his release. In 2022, Charles's estate reached a $9.5 million global settlement from the State Bureau of Investigations and the Wilson County Sheriff's Department
- Cyrus Wilson: Case Summary: In 1994, Cyrus was convicted of the 1992 murder of Christopher Luckett in Nashville, Tennessee. Result: On October 23, 2019, he was granted parole by the Tennessee Board of Parole while maintaining his innocence.
- Theophalis Wilson: Case Summary: In 1993, Theophalis was convicted of the 1989 murders of Otis Reynolds, Gavin Anderson, and Kevin Anderson. Result: He was declared innocent on January 21, 2020.
- William Montgomery: Case Summary: William was convicted of the 1986 murders of Debra Ogle and Cynthia Tincher in Toledo, Ohio, and given a death sentence. Result: In March 2018, Ohio Governor John Kasich commuted William's death sentence to a life sentence.
- Pedro Reynoso: Case Summary: Pedro Reynoso was convicted of the 1991 murders of Charles Rivera and Carlos Torres in Philadelphia. Result: Pedro is current appealing his convictions based on evidence and witnesses placing him in the Dominican Republic at the time of the murders.
- Marcellus Williams: Case Summary: Marcellus Williams was convicted of the 1998 murder of Felicia Gayle. Result: Governor Eric Greitens stayed Marcellus Williams’s execution in August 2017. He also appointed a Board of Inquiry to review his case. Without that Board ever issuing a report, Missouri governor Mike Parson lifted the stay of execution in July 2023. In September 2024, despite renewed efforts to save his life, Marcellus was executed.
- Cyntoia Brown: Case Summary: Cyntoia Brown was convicted of the 2004 murder and robbery of Johnny Michael Allen. Result: Governor Bill Haslam granted Cyntoia Brown clemency, and she was released August 7, 2019.

== See also ==
- List of American crime podcasts
- Serial (podcast)
- Killing of Hae Min Lee
- Adnan Syed
- Nieman Lab article on Undisclosed that uses Undisclosed as a backdrop against other true crime podcasts
