= A Very Fatal Murder =

Satirical true crime podcast

- Genre: Satire, True Crime, Comedy
- Language: English

Creative team
- Directed by: Ryan Natoli and Fran Hoepfner

Cast and voices
- Hosted by: David Pascall (voiced by David Sidorov)

Publication
- No. of seasons: 2
- No. of episodes: 17
- Original release: January 23, 2018 – May 11, 2019
- Provider: The Onion

A Very Fatal Murder is a podcast produced by the satirical publication The Onion. A parody of true crime podcasts, A Very Fatal Murder is hosted by fictional New York City reporter David Pascall, who travels to the small town Bluff Springs, Nebraska to investigate the murder of prom queen Hayley Price. Pascall is voiced by David Sidorov, who also wrote for the podcast. The podcast premiered on January 23, 2018, and consists of 7 episodes. Season 2 was released in its entirety on May 11, 2019.

== Production ==
A Very Fatal Murder satirizes popular true crime podcasts such as Serial, S-Town, and My Favorite Murder. According to head writer Katy Yeiser, the podcast is not meant as a take down of any particular podcast, but rather an ode to the genre.

== Synopsis ==
The podcast follows fictional investigative reporter David Pascall (voiced by David Sidorov) who is searching for the perfect murder to create an award-winning podcast about. He is assisted by ETHL (the Extremely Timely Homicide Locator), an MIT-created computer programmed to find "the most interesting, violent, culturally relevant murder cases in America".

== Episodes ==
=== Season 1 ===
#	Title	Date
1	"Episode 1: A Perfect Murder"	January 23, 2018
2	"Episode 2: What I Know And What I Don't Know Yet"	February 12, 2018
3	"Episode 3: Calloway Day"	February 16, 2018
4	"Episode 4: The Official Story"	February 23, 2018
5	"Episode 5, Part 1: Did My Police Department Miss Something?"	March 2, 2018
6	"Episode 5, Part 2: Did My Police Department Miss Something?"	March 7, 2018
7	"Episode 6: The Game Changer"	March 9, 2018

=== Season 2 ===
#	Title	Date
1	"Episode 1: A New Beginning"	May 11, 2019
"Coming off the success of A Very Fatal Murder Season 1, OPR reporter David Pascall finds himself in Los Angeles, searching for a new murder to investigate."
2	"Episode 2: Everything You Think You Know (And Why You Should Forget It)"	May 11, 2019
"After finding his next murder, David covers the arraignment of Mylo Reed—a high-profile, handsome, rich man accused of murdering his equally rich and famous wife."
3	"Episode 3: The People vs. Mylo Reed"	May 11, 2019
"David scores an exclusive interview with Mylo Reed and gets a closer look inside the mind of a psychopath."
4	"Episode 4: Where It Happened And Where It Didn't"	May 11, 2019
"After finding holes in the prosecution's case against Mylo, David investigates the victim and visits the crime scene to recreate the night of the murder."
5	"Episode 5: Touching the Evidence"	May 11, 2019
"After becoming suspicious of the defense team, David explores the evidence against Mylo and sets out to prove that a lot of it doesn't hold up in court."
6	"Episode 6: A Very Fair Trial"	May 11, 2019
"After becoming suspicious of the defense team, David explores the evidence against Mylo and sets out to prove that a lot of it doesn't hold up in court."
7	"Episode 7: The Curious Case of Michael Furnari"	May 11, 2019
"David digs deeper to answer the question of who really killed Lyanna Choi-Reed as he looks for alternative theories on Reddit and takes a closer look at the state's key witness."
8	"Episode 8: A Star Witness Is Born"	May 11, 2019
"After falling behind in both the court of public opinion and the actual real court that sends people to jail, David is left with no choice but to call a secret, key witness for the defense."
9	"Episode 9: Live At The Clara Shortridge Folz Criminal Justice Centre"	May 11, 2019
"Is Mylo Reed guilty or innocent? The court hears closing arguments and the jury deliberates before giving the final verdict, all on a very special LIVE episode of A Very Fatal Murder!" A "live show" recording of the court sessions. Guest starring Bill Kurtis and Peter Sagal from Wait Wait... Don't Tell Me!.
10	"Episode 10: Consequences"	May 11, 2019
"After a stunning verdict, David learns more facts about the case that could turn the whole thing upside down."

== Reception ==
The podcast received mostly positive reviews, and was largely praised for attacking true-crime tropes such as the "hot dead girl" and the romanticization of small-town America.

=== Awards ===
Award	Date	Category	Result	Ref.
Webby Awards	2018	Comedy	Nominated	
Webby Awards	2018	Writing	Nominated	
