= Murder of Adrianna Hutto =

Murder by drowning of child in Florida, U.S.

Adrianna Hutto
- Adrianna Hutto
- Born: September 16, 1999; Esto, Florida, U.S.
- Died: August 8, 2007 (aged 7); Esto, Florida, U.S.
- Cause of death: Drowning (murder)
- Parent: Amanda E. Lewis

Adrianna Elaine Hutto (September 16, 1999 – August 8, 2007) was a seven-year-old American girl who lived in Esto, Florida. On August 8, 2007, Adrianna's mother, Amanda E. Lewis, made a 911 call stating that she had found her daughter in the family's pool and she was not breathing. Emergency personnel rushed Adrianna to the nearby hospital, Bay Medical, where she was pronounced dead about an hour after arrival. The death was initially treated as an accident until Adrianna's half-brother A.J., then six years old, told police that his mother "dunked" Adrianna in the pool as a form of corporal punishment. Amanda was convicted of first-degree murder and aggravated child abuse and was sentenced to life in prison without the possibility of parole in 2008.

== Investigation ==
During the investigation, police discovered that Adrianna had been diagnosed with ADHD. Lewis stated that while she initially had trouble bonding with her daughter, her affection for Adrianna had grown over time.

Investigators found that neither Adrianna nor A.J. appeared to have many toys in the house. Lewis claimed that the toys had been taken away for a week as a form of punishment and that the toys were stored in a shed. After searching the shed, investigators noted that there were no toys in the shed. There was a little red wagon and two inflatable toys for the pool in the yard. Lewis submitted to and passed a lie detector test, during which she claimed that she had not killed her daughter.

Sheriff Lee spoke with reporters, incorrectly saying that the police had found Adrianna in the above-ground pool on the property; in fact, she had been pulled from the pool by her mother, who performed CPR before the police arrived.

In September 2007, Lewis was arrested and charged with first-degree murder. She was offered a plea bargain that would have required her to plead guilty to manslaughter in exchange for a ten-year sentence, but she declined in favor of going to trial.

== Trial ==
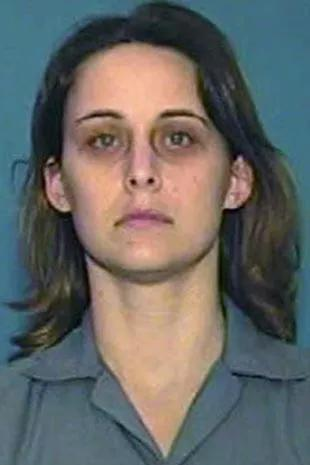
Amanda Lewis arrested Sept 2007

Lewis went to trial in February 2008. When statements by A.J. were entered as evidence, the defense argued that A.J. was not a reliable witness, as his story had changed several times during further questioning. Other evidence brought to trial included statements from Lewis's co-workers; evidence of poor housekeeping; the lack of toys, including Lewis's deception regarding the toys' whereabouts; and an autopsy performed by medical examiner Charles Siebert, who had been previously relieved of duty for negligence in 36 previous cases, including the death of Martin Anderson, and reinstated under supervision. (Prior to the trial, Dr. Siebert had been removed from duty yet again and left the state.) The prosecution pointed to multiple bruises on Adrianna's forehead that they claimed correlated with A.J.'s testimony.

On the second day of proceedings, two of the six empaneled jurors failed to return to the courtroom, necessitating the selection of substitutes. Following four days of proceedings and after only two hours (including lunch) of deliberation, the jury found Lewis guilty of first-degree murder and aggravated child abuse. In March of the same year, Lewis was sentenced to life in prison without the possibility of parole.

== Appeals ==
In 2010 Lewis filed an appeal, referring to the merger doctrine, which she claimed "precludes the use of aggravated child abuse as the underlying felony in a felony murder charge if only a single act of abuse led to the child's death". This appeal was unsuccessful, and the conviction was affirmed.

On November 7, 2025, Lewis filed a Motion for Post-Conviction Relief. The Motion alleges four Constitutional violations regarding the jurors at Lewis's trial.

== In the media ==
Three television shows have highlighted this case: the Investigation Discovery series True Crime with Aphrodite Jones; an episode of 20/20 entitled "What A.J. Saw: Mother's Fate Hinged on 7-Year-Old's Testimony"; and an episode of the UK documentary series Killer Women with Piers Morgan.

The IN ESTO: What Really Happened to Adrianna Hutto? By N Leigh Hunt podcast was produced in 2024. It won two High Commended awards at the True Crime Awards UK in 2025 and was nominated for a Clue Award at Crime Con 2025.

The Undisclosed podcast did an 11-episode series about Adrianna's drowning in 2025. While investigating the case, the hosts uncovered four possible grounds for Amanda Lewis to appeal her convictions: (1) the judge removing one of the six presiding jurors at Lewis's trial despite deeming him competent to serve; (2) the judge removing this juror outside Lewis's presence and without her approval; (3) a second juror failing to disclose that she overheard the lead police officer on Lewis's case at a grocery store falsely claiming that Lewis never should have had children because she was a drug addict; and (4) this second juror only being 17 years old.
