= Caffey family murders =

2008 mass murder in Texas

- Location: Emory, Texas, U.S.
- Date: March 1, 2008; 18 years ago
- Attack type: Familicide (Fratricide & Matricide), mass murder, child murder, arson
- Deaths: 3 (Note: Penny Caffey (37); Matthew "Bubba" Caffey (13); Tyler Caffey (8))
- Injuries: 1 (Note: Terry Caffey (41))
- Perpetrators: Erin Caffey (16); Charlie Wilkinson (18) (Note: Some sources say he was 19.); Charles Waid (20); Bobbi Johnson (18)
- Verdict: All four pleaded guilty
- Convictions: Capital murder or Murder (Note: None of the four defendants went to trial, each opting for a plea deal.)
- Sentence: Life imprisonment with the possibility of parole after 43 years (Note: Eligible for parole at the age of 59.) (Caffey); Life imprisonment without the possibility of parole (Wilkinson and Waid); 40 years in prison (Note: Eligible for parole after serving 20 years.) (Johnson)

Three members of the Caffey family were murdered in their house in Alba, Texas, United States, on March 1, 2008. Erin Caffey, then 16, organized the murder of her mother, Penny Caffey, and younger brothers Matthew, 13, and Tyler, 8. Her father Terry was the only survivor; he escaped to safety after being shot eleven times. The murders were committed by Erin's then-boyfriend Charlie Wilkinson and his friend Charles Waid, with Waid's girlfriend Bobbi Johnson acting as a getaway driver. Erin and Wilkinson planned the murder for a month, after Erin's parents' disapproval of their relationship. The crime gained notoriety for its violent nature, with one of Erin's brothers being stabbed repeatedly and her mother almost decapitated.

== Background ==
The Caffey family were devout Christians and part of the Miracle Faith Baptist Church, where Erin was in the church choir and Terry was a youth pastor. They lived in Alba, Texas, a rural community with a population of 492 at the time. The Caffey children had been homeschooled for three years, and were taught a Bible-based curriculum. Erin was diagnosed with attention deficit disorder, a reason for the homeschooling. They had been re-enrolled at public schools six weeks prior to the murders, with Erin going to Rains High School.

Erin met 18-year-old Charlie Wilkinson while working at fast-food chain Sonic in 2007, with the pair quickly forming a romantic relationship. Wilkinson lived with his father and step-mother, seeing his biological mother once or twice a year. Wilkinson had given Erin his grandmother's engagement ring as a promise ring; Penny demanded she give it back after noticing it during a church function. Weeks prior to the murders, Erin was told that she was not allowed to see Wilkinson after Penny discovered his MySpace page, which had references to profanity and sex. Erin and Wilkinson began plotting the murders after this incident so they could stay together, reportedly planning the crime for a month. Erin's ex-boyfriend later revealed that she had previously tried to enlist him to kill her family for their disapproval of her relationship with him, but he refused and subsequently broke up with her.

== Murders ==
In the morning hours of March 1, 2008, Wilkinson and Waid entered the Caffey family house, while Erin waited outside in a car with Johnson. At around 3:00 a.m., . Penny Caffey was the first to be shot, and was stabbed with a samurai sword leading to near decapitation. Matthew was shot in the head; Tyler was repeatedly stabbed with the sword by Wilkinson and Waid. All four suspects were found in a mobile home owned by Waid, and apprehended on the same day as the killings.

== Legal proceedings and aftermath ==
Waid, Wilkinson, Johnson, and Caffey were charged with three counts of capital murder each, with prosecutors stating they did not plan to seek the death penalty for Erin. The defendants had their bonds set at $1.5 million each. Though a minor at the time of the killing, Erin was tried as an adult and held in Hopkins County Jail. On January 2, 2009, she received two life sentences for her role after accepting a plea deal, making her eligible for parole when she is 59 years old. Wilkinson and Waid were spared the death penalty after accepting a plea agreement, receiving life sentences without the possibility of parole. Johnson was named as an accomplice who did not use a weapon and was sentenced to 40 years in prison. She would be eligible for parole after serving 20 years.

Waid has since expressed remorse for the crime. Terry Caffey recalled being suicidal following the incident. He cites God as the reason for being able to reconcile with the event and forgive those involved. After Terry returned to his former home alone for the first time since the crime, he looked to the sky and said, "God why didn't you take me, why did you take my family, I need an answer now, not next week, not next month, I need an answer today." He then saw a piece of paper stuck to a tree with the words "You're sovereign; You're in control", which motivated him to forgive his daughter for the crime. When told prosecutors were seeking the death penalty for Wilkinson and Waid, he proclaimed that Jesus would have "spared their life" and told prosecutors that their deaths would not bring his family back. Caffey now ministers full time and has visited 600 public schools and 800 churches to share his story. He has since remarried and has four children (1 biological and 3 adopted) with his wife Karen.

== In popular culture ==
The crime was featured in American crime drama television series Final Witness in 2012. In 2020, the crime was the premise of the sixth episode in Season 13 of Snapped: Killer Couples. In 2016, Erin was interviewed by English journalist Piers Morgan for television documentary series Killer Women with Piers Morgan. Terry has written a book on the events, titled Terror by Night: The True Story of the Brutal Texas Murder That Destroyed a Family, Restored One Man's Faith, and Shocked a Nation. In 2014, the story was featured on the American talk show Dr. Phil, with Terry appearing as a guest.

== See also ==
- Crime in Texas
- Familicide
- Richardson family murders
- Watts family murders
