= Keion Carpenter =

American football player (1977–2016)

No. 29
- Position: Safety

Personal information
- Born: October 31, 1977; Baltimore, Maryland, U.S.
- Died: December 29, 2016 (aged 39); Miami, Florida, U.S.
- Listed height: 5 ft 11 in (1.80 m)
- Listed weight: 205 lb (93 kg)

Career information
- High school: Woodlawn (MD)
- College: Virginia Tech
- NFL draft: 1999: undrafted

Career history
- Buffalo Bills (1999–2001); Atlanta Falcons (2002–2005)

Career NFL statistics
- Total tackles: 211
- Forced fumbles: 2
- Fumble recoveries: 1
- Pass deflections: 35
- Interceptions: 14
- Defensive touchdowns: 1
- Stats at Pro Football Reference

Keion Eric Carpenter (October 31, 1977 – December 29, 2016) was an American professional football safety who played for the Buffalo Bills and the Atlanta Falcons of the National Football League.

== Football career ==
Carpenter played high school football at Woodlawn High School and college football at Virginia Tech and was signed as an undrafted free agent by the Buffalo Bills. He played for the Bills during the 1999, 2000, and 2001 seasons before being traded to the Atlanta Falcons in 2002. Carpenter was injured at the end of the 2003 season, tearing his ACL. Carpenter was also known as one of the few players to have had successful spinal fusion surgery who returned to football, playing for three years after the surgery.

== Personal life ==
Carpenter had a wife and four children, three daughters and one son.

He was the founder of The Carpenter House, Inc., a non-profit which specialized in consulting under-privileged families with home ownership.

=== Death ===
On December 27, 2016, while on vacation in Miami with his family, Carpenter fell and struck his head. He slipped into a coma and died two days later without regaining consciousness.
