= Tavon Rooks =

American football player (born 1990)

No. 74, 65
- Position: Offensive tackle

Personal information
- Born: May 10, 1990 (age 36); Randallstown, Maryland, U.S.
- Listed height: 6 ft 5 in (1.96 m)
- Listed weight: 280 lb (127 kg)

Career information
- High school: Woodlawn (Baltimore County, Maryland)
- College: College of the Canyons (2010); Navarro (2011); Kansas State (2012–2013)
- NFL draft: 2014: 6th round, 202nd overall pick

Career history
- New Orleans Saints (2014)*; Arizona Cardinals (2015)*; Kansas City Chiefs (2015)
- * Offseason or practice squad member only
- Stats at Pro Football Reference

Tavon Rooks (born May 10, 1990) is an American former football offensive tackle. He played college football at the College of the Canyons, Navarro College, and Kansas State, and was selected by the New Orleans Saints in the sixth round of the 2014 NFL draft. Rooks was also a member of the Arizona Cardinals and the Kansas City Chiefs.

== Early life ==
Tavon Rooks was born on May 10, 1990. Rooks attended Woodlawn High School in Baltimore County, Maryland, where he played football.

== College career ==
Rooks first chose to attend the College of the Canyons in Santa Clarita, California to play football there, but transferred after one year. He then played football at Navarro College in Corsicana, Texas, where he helped lead them to a national championship and a top-five ranking. Once again, Rooks only stayed for one year, as after the 2011 season he transferred to Kansas State University. While playing at Kansas State, Rooks started ten out of thirteen games his junior year and all thirteen games his senior year to end his college career.

== Professional career ==
=== New Orleans Saints ===
After his time at Kansas State, Rooks was selected with the 202nd pick in the 6th round of the 2014 NFL draft by the New Orleans Saints. However, Rooks did not make the active roster and was instead signed to the Saints' practice squad for most of the 2014 season.

=== Arizona Cardinals ===
Near the end of the 2014 season, Rooks was signed off of the Saints' practice squad by the Arizona Cardinals and signed a reserve/future contract with the team. Rooks was cut before the 2015 regular season in June.

=== Kansas City Chiefs ===
Later in June 2015, Rooks was signed by the Kansas City Chiefs. In August 2015, it was revealed that Rooks had suffered a heart attack during a practice that month. Rooks was placed on medical IR, and later released by the Chiefs.
