= Serial (podcast) =

American investigative journalism podcast

- Genre: Investigative journalism; Serialized audio narrative
- Country of origin: United States
- Language: English

Cast and voices
- Hosted by: Sarah Koenig; Dana Chivvis (s. 4–)

Production
- Production: Sarah Koenig; Julie Snyder; Dana Chivvis; Emily Condon; Jessica Weisberg
- Length: Variable (16–65 minutes)

Technical specifications
- Audio format: Podcast (via streaming or downloadable MP3)

Publication
- No. of seasons: 4
- No. of episodes: 42
- Original release: October 3, 2014
- Provider: WBEZ
- Updates: Thursday morning; Season one: weekly; Season two: Episodes 1–3: weekly; Episodes 4–11: every other week; Season three: weekly; Season four: weekly

Reception
- Cited for: 2015 Peabody Award
- Cited as: "an audio game-changer"

Related
- Adaptations: The Case Against Adnan Syed
- Website: serialpodcast.org

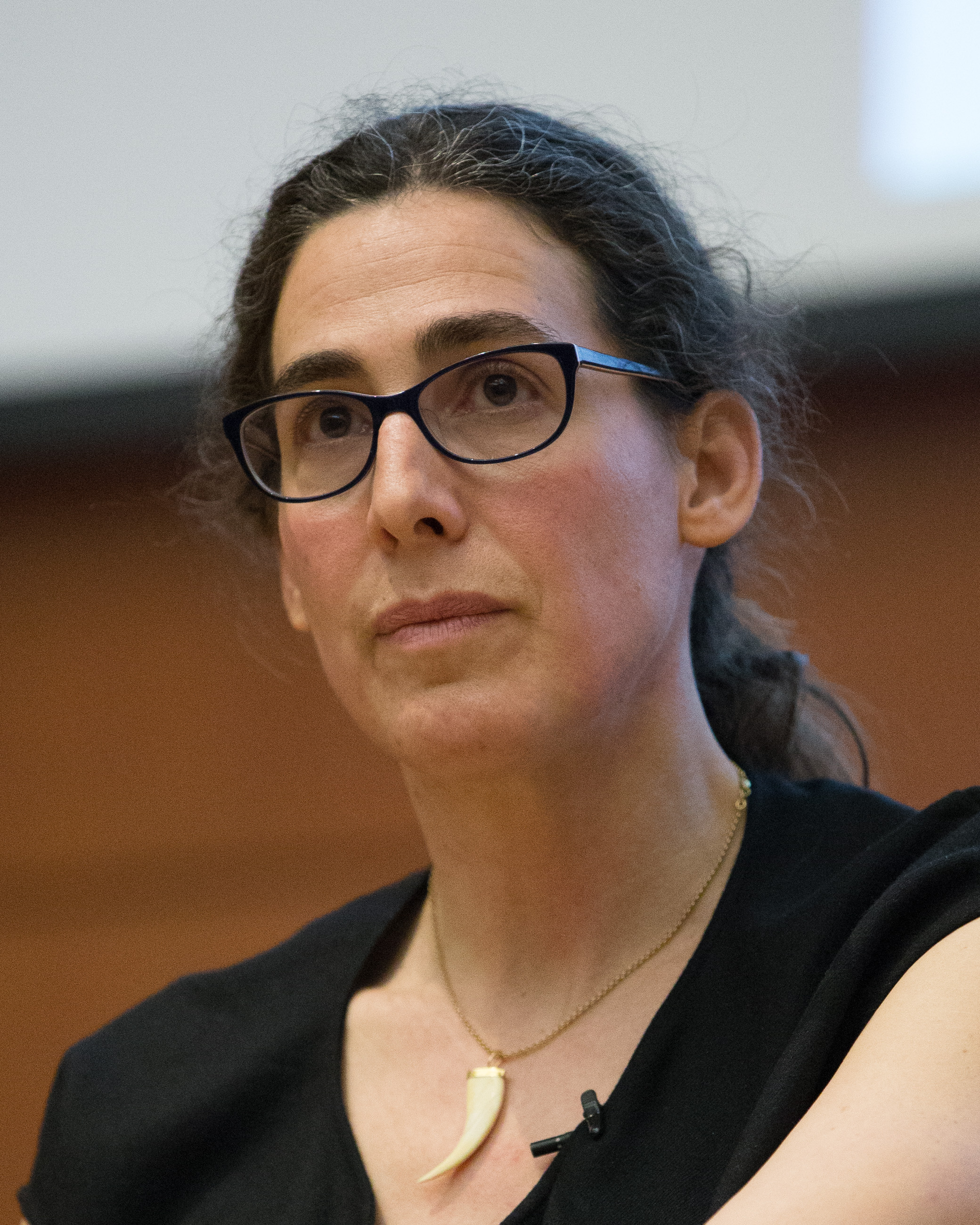
Serial host and producer Sarah Koenig

Serial is an investigative journalism podcast hosted by Sarah Koenig, narrating a nonfiction story over multiple episodes. The series was co-created and is co-produced by Koenig and Julie Snyder and developed by This American Life; as of July 2020, it is owned by The New York Times.

Season 1 investigated the 1999 killing of Hae Min Lee (Hangul: 이해민), an 18-year-old student at Woodlawn High School in Baltimore County. Season 2 focused on Sergeant Bowe Bergdahl, an American Army soldier who was held for five years by the Taliban, and then charged with desertion. Season 3 explores cases within the Justice Center Complex in the Cleveland area. Season 4, covering the history of the Guantanamo Bay detention camp, premiered in March 2024.

Serial is credited with popularizing the true crime podcast genre. It ranked number one on iTunes even before its debut and remained there for several weeks. Serial won a Peabody Award in April 2015 for its innovative telling of a long-form nonfiction story. As of September 2018, episodes of seasons 1 and 2 have been downloaded over 340 million times, establishing an ongoing podcast world record.

== Series overview ==
Season	Episodes		Originally released	
Season	Episodes		First released	Last released
1	13	12	October 3, 2014	December 18, 2014
1	13	1	September 20, 2022	
2	11		December 10, 2015	March 31, 2016
3	9		September 20, 2018	November 15, 2018
4	9		March 28, 2024	May 16, 2024

Koenig has said that Serial is "about the basics: love and death and justice and truth. All these big, big things." She also has noted, "this is not an original idea. Maybe in podcast form it is, and trying to do it as a documentary story is really, really hard. But trying to do it as a serial, this is as old as Dickens."

New York Magazine reported that Phil Lord and Chris Miller, directors of The Lego Movie and the film 21 Jump Street, would be producing a television program about the podcast that will take a "behind-the-scenes approach that details how Koenig went from virtual anonymity to creating one of 2014's biggest cultural phenomenons".

=== Season 1 (2014) ===
On February 9, 2015, Scott Pelley of CBS News reported Serial's season 1 episodes had been downloaded more than 68 million times. By February 2016, the episodes had been downloaded over 80 million times.

Season 1 investigated the 1999 Killing of Hae Min Lee (Korean: 이해민), an 18-year-old student at Woodlawn High School in Baltimore. She was last seen at about 3 p.m. on January 13, 1999. Her corpse was discovered on February 9 in Leakin Park and identified two days later.

The case was immediately treated as a homicide. On February 12, an anonymous source contacted authorities and suggested that Adnan Masud Syed, Lee's ex-boyfriend, might be a suspect. Syed was arrested on February 28 at 6 a.m. and charged with first-degree murder, which led to "some closure and some peace" for Lee's family. A memorial service for Lee was held on March 11 at Woodlawn High School.

Syed's first trial ended in a mistrial, but, after a six-week second trial, Syed was found guilty of Lee's murder on February 25, 2000, and was given a life sentence. On September 19, 2022, a judge, citing the prosecution's failure to hand over potentially beneficial evidence to the defense, overturned the conviction. Syed, after 23 years in prison, went free. After a lengthy appeal process, a judge reinstated the murder conviction in March 2025, but reduced Syed's sentence. As a consequence, he does not have to return to prison but will remain convicted of first-degree premeditated murder.

==== People involved ====
- Hae Min Lee – 18-year-old high school student and athlete, abducted in January 1999 and found dead the next month
- Adnan Syed – former boyfriend of Lee who was convicted of killing her in 2000. His conviction was vacated in 2022 – nearly eight years after the podcast was published – after prosecutors filed a motion stating that "the state no longer has confidence in the integrity of the conviction."
- Jay Wilds – key witness at Syed's trial and professed accomplice of Syed
- Stephanie McPherson – Jay's girlfriend and close friend and classmate of Syed
- Don Clinedinst – Lee's boyfriend at the time of her murder and colleague at Lenscrafters, an eyewear shop
- Aisha Pittman – classmate and Lee's close friend
- Jennifer (Jenn) Pusateri – Jay's close friend
- Debbie Warren – Lee's friend who said Lee told her she was meeting Don after school
- Krista Myers – classmate and close friend of Lee and Syed, who recalled Syed asked Lee for a ride after school the day she disappeared
- Becky Walker – classmate/friend who remembered Lee and Syed had talked about a ride, who also said she saw Syed after school
- "Cathy" – a friend of Pusateri who said she saw Wilds and Syed on the day Lee disappeared
- Saad Chaudry – Syed's best friend
- Asia McClain – student at Woodlawn High School and acquaintance of Syed and Lee, said she saw Syed in the library at the time of the murder
- Laura Estrada – classmate who did not believe Syed was guilty, but who did not think Jay would lie about something serious
- Nisha – student from Silver Spring, Md. and friend of Syed's, who was called from Syed's phone at 3:32 pm, a time during which Syed claimed Jay (who did not know Nisha) had his phone
- Yasser Ali – Syed's friend from the mosque
- Rabia Chaudry – friend of Syed's family, older sister of Saad Chaudry, and an attorney, who has been fighting for years to prove Adnan's innocence
- "Mr. S" – discovered Lee's body in Leakin Park
- Kevin Urick and Kathleen "KC" Murphy – state prosecutors at trial
- M. Cristina Gutierrez – Syed's defense attorney
- Detectives Bill Ritz and Greg MacGillivary – lead homicide investigators
- Ronald Lee Moore – suspected serial killer named as a possible suspect in Lee's death

=== Season 2 (2015–16) ===
In September 2015, The New York Times reported the second season would focus on Sergeant Bowe Bergdahl, an American Army soldier who was held for five years by the Taliban, and then charged with desertion. A spokesperson for Serial only said, "Over the last few months they've been reporting on a variety of stories for both seasons 2 and 3 of Serial, along with other podcast projects." The first episode of the season was released, without any previous release date announcement, on December 10, 2015.

For season 2, Koenig teamed up with Mark Boal, the Academy Award–winning screenwriter of The Hurt Locker and Zero Dark Thirty, and his production company, Page 1. Boal had conducted a series of interviews with Bergdahl as part of a film production he was working on, and both Boal and Bergdahl gave Koenig permission to use those excerpts of those recorded interviews in episodes of Serial. As Koenig stated in season 2's first episode: "They'd come to us saying 'hey, we've been doing all this reporting on the story, and we've also got this tape. Do you think you might want to listen?' And yes, we did, and we were kind of blown away, and so we began working with them. They shared their research with us, and also put us in touch with many of their sources... We don't have anything to do with their movie, but Mark and Page 1 are our partners for Season 2."

On December 14, 2015, General Robert B. Abrams, head of United States Army Forces Command at Fort Bragg, North Carolina ordered that Bergdahl face a court-martial on charges of desertion.

Sarah Koenig announced on January 12, 2016, that the podcast schedule would be changed to every other week to allow for deeper reporting, and to add more information than initially planned. Internet radio service Pandora Radio streamed the second season of Serial.

On November 3, 2017, military judge Col. Jeffery R. Nance rendered a verdict dishonorably discharging Bergdahl from the Army, reducing his rank to private and requiring forfeit of some of his pay for ten months and no prison time. The verdict is subject to review by Gen. Robert B. Abrams, and may also be appealed to the United States Army Court of Criminal Appeals. After the sentencing, Serial announced its team to be working on a "coda" for the season.

==== Award ====
In June 2017, the Radio Television Digital News Association announced that season two of Serial had won the 2017 National Edward R. Murrow Award for a news series and for its website. Murrow Awards are presented in October in New York.

==== Persons involved ====
- Sergeant Bowe Bergdahl – held for five years by the Taliban, then released in May 2014 in exchange for Taliban prisoners held in the Guantanamo Bay detention camp. He was court-martialed on charges of desertion and misbehavior before the enemy in December 2015.
- Lieutenant John Billings – Bergdahl's platoon leader
- Mark Boal – screenwriter of The Hurt Locker with whom Bergdahl held most of his interviews
- Shane Cross – a friend from the same platoon as Bergdahl
- Ben Evans – soldier who had described OP Mest, where Bergdahl operated out of
- Darrel Hanson – in the same company as Bergdahl
- Kayla Harrison – a friend, and Kim Harrison's daughter
- Kim Harrison – a friend Bergdahl identified as his emergency contact
- Josh Korder – in the same company as Bergdahl, recorded message for Bergdahl over radio
- Austin Landford – soldier whom Bergdahl was supposed to relieve at the end of his shift. It was Landford's noticing Bergdahl's non-presence that notifies the Army that he has gone missing
- Mark McCrorie – in the same company as Bergdahl
- Mujahet Raman (not his real name) – Taliban who speaks about Bergdahl's capture
- Jon Thurman – in the same company as Bergdahl

=== Season 3 (2018) ===
Season 3 is meant to be an analysis of the normal operation of the American criminal justice system, as opposed to the previous two seasons, which followed "extraordinary" cases. K. Austin Collins of Vanity Fair commented that the third season was "an overarching account of an institution: the criminal-justice system, writ large". Koenig has described season 3 as "a year watching ordinary criminal justice, in the least exceptional, most middle-of-the-road, most middle-of-the-country place we could find: Cleveland." Reported by Emmanuel Dzotsi, episodes follow different cases and are taped in Greater Cleveland, with particular focus on cases before the Cuyahoga County Court of Common Pleas at the Justice Center Complex in Downtown Cleveland.

=== Season 4: Guantánamo (2024) ===
A fourth season, subtitled Guantánamo, focusing on the history of the Guantanamo Bay detention camp, was announced in February 2024. The nine-episode season premiered with two episodes on March 28, 2024, with episodes released weekly thereafter. Season 4 is produced by Jessica Weisberg, with Koenig co-hosting the season with Serial producer Dana Chivvis. Koenig, Chivvis and their team interviewed over 100 people, including guards, interrogators, commanders, lawyers, chaplains, translators and former prisoners. The season has been described as "a history of Guantánamo told by people who lived through key moments in its evolution, who know things the rest of us don't about what it's like to be caught inside an improvised justice system."

== Episodes ==
=== Season 1 (2014) ===
No. in season	Title	Length (minutes:seconds)	Original release date
1	"The Alibi"	53:28	October 3, 2014
This episode explores the murder of Hae Min Lee, Adnan Syed's ex-girlfriend, who was a senior at Baltimore County's Woodlawn High School. She disappeared in January 1999. Serial's investigative team "follows up on long-dormant leads, rechecks alibis, and questions assumptions." Host Sarah Koenig reveals that the story is in process and that she does not know how it will end.
2	"The Breakup"	36:28	October 3, 2014
Adnan Syed and Hae Min Lee had a storybook romance, which was kept secret from their disapproving parents. When Lee broke it off, their friends had conflicting interpretations of Syed's behavior: he was either cool with it and sad, or in a rage and hatching a sinister plot to kill her. Syed proclaims his innocence, but there are puzzling inconsistencies in the set of facts he tells.
3	"Leakin Park"	27:34	October 10, 2014
Lee had been missing for three weeks when a man on his lunch break, referred to as "Mr. S", discovered her body. His account of how he found her body seems suspicious to detectives MacGillivary and Ritz, who questioned him, and his background check reveals some bizarre behaviors, including a series of streaking episodes.
4	"Inconsistencies"	33:44	October 16, 2014
An anonymous caller leads detectives to subpoena Adnan Syed's cell phone records. As a result, the detectives discover calls to Jen, who is a friend of one of Adnan's acquaintances, a weed dealer named Jay. Detectives interview Jen and then Jay, who says Syed told him he killed Lee, and then forced him to help bury her body. Details of Jay's story shifted in some significant ways over four interviews, but the detectives said they were able to corroborate his story using cell phone records.
5	"Route Talk"	43:10	October 23, 2014
Producers Koenig and Chivvis test drive the prosecution's route and timeline of Lee's murder between 2:15, when school let out at the high school, and 2:36, when Jay said Syed called him for pick up in the Best Buy parking lot and then showed Jay Lee's body in the trunk of her car. While that timeline seems possible, though just barely, evidence from the call logs and records of cell tower pings do not quite align with Jay's testimony about the rest of the afternoon.
6	"The Case Against Adnan Syed"	43:37	October 30, 2014
In addition to Jay's testimony, evidence against Adnan Syed included a palm print on a map that could not be dated, and cell phone records. Did Syed ask Lee for a ride after school to get into her car? Koenig goes through all the evidence, including the prosecution's timeline and "some stray things" that do not add up, including a neighbor's story, the testimony of Jay's friend Jen, and the sequence of cell phone calls after Lee disappeared.
7	"The Opposite of the Prosecution"	32:30	November 6, 2014
Deirdre Enright, Director of Investigation for the Innocence Project at the University of Virginia School of Law, and a team of law students analyze the case against Adnan Syed. Deirdre thinks the evidence against him was "thin". She advises Koenig to keep revisiting all the evidence, allowing uncertainties to remain until there is a tipping point when her questions are resolved. They start with a presumption of Syed's innocence, and ask whether they can discover who really did kill Lee. They find some undeveloped forensic evidence, but Koenig is still uncertain.
8	"The Deal with Jay"	43:56	November 13, 2014
How credible was Jay's story? Koenig interviews a jury member, who said Jay seemed like a nice young man and believable. A professional detective says the investigation of Lee's murder was better than average, and Jay had handed the police the case on a platter. Koenig and Snyder visit Jay, who declines an interview. Jay's friend Chris recalls what Jay told him about the murder, a story not consistent with Jay's courtroom version. Why did Jay agree to help Syed? Did Syed coerce Jay and threaten to hurt Jay's girlfriend Stephanie? His friends said Jay had a reputation for lying, but not about important things. Jay's friend Jen says she could understand why Jay might lie about some details, but she believed his story. Back to the question: what was the jury thinking?
9	"To Be Suspected"	47:40	November 20, 2014
Koenig reveals she has new information about the call at 2:36. First, Laura claims there were never any pay phones in front of the Best Buy, but Jay's drawing shows a phone booth in front of the Best Buy, and he claimed Syed was standing by that phone booth with red gloves on. Second, Lee's friend Summer says that Lee could not have been dead by 2:36, because she had a conversation with Lee between 2:30 and 2:45. Others also saw Lee after school that day. Third, Asia saw Syed at the library in that same time frame. Sarah Koenig explores Syed's perspective as he was questioned, arrested, tried, and sentenced, as well as his letters to friends about life in prison. She mentions that she has reasonable doubt, not in the legal sense, but in the "normal person" sense.
10	"The Best Defense is a Good Defense"	53:55	December 4, 2014
Did anti-Muslim sentiment affect the prosecution? The prosecution argued that Syed's community would help him flee to Pakistan if bail were granted, making suggestions that Syed murdered Lee as religiously motivated killing by a lover with "honor besmirched". Defense attorney Cristina Gutierrez argued that someone else did it, and police did not look beyond Syed. His first trial ended in a mistrial, and in the second trial she cast suspicion on Mr. S and Jay as involved in the crime, but she did not present a clear outline of these arguments or scrutinize discrepancies in the call log timeline. Gutierrez discovered the prosecutor had secured an attorney for Jay – arguably a "benefit" worth money – in connection with his pleading guilty as an accessory and agreeing to testify, but the judge did not agree that this tainted Jay's testimony. Koenig does not believe Cristina Gutierrez intentionally bungled his defense, but within a year after Syed's trial, Gutierrez became very ill and she was disbarred.
11	"Rumors"	41:25	December 11, 2014
Koenig investigates negative rumors about Syed. People from his mosque were scared when he was arrested, some describing his story as a cautionary tale. Some believe Syed was duplicitous, capable of committing the crime. One rumor, that he stole money from the mosque, was partially confirmed by four people. Syed admitted taking some money when he was in eighth grade, but his mother found out, and he felt ashamed. Syed had a reputation as a peacemaker, "a good guy", helpful and caring. People who knew him in high school cannot believe he planned Lee's murder. Did Syed "lose it", and nurse feelings of rejection? Could Syed have committed murder in a dissociative state, not knowing he did it? Koenig explores whether Syed has true empathy or anti-social characteristics, and consults with psychologist Charles Ewing, who has interviewed many young murderers. Why does Syed not sound more angry about Jay or other people connected to his case? In an 18-page letter to Koenig, Syed reveals his concern about being perceived as manipulative, and says it does not matter how the podcast portrays him.
12	"What We Know"	55:37	December 18, 2014
After spending over a year researching the case, Koenig still is uncertain what happened the day that Lee disappeared. She reveals new information that happened as a result of people hearing about the podcast: she has spoken with Don, Lee's boyfriend of 13 days at the time of her disappearance, and with Jay's former co-worker, Josh. Koenig reviews the phone records again with her production team and determines that neither Jay's nor Syed's story of that day aligns with the evidence. Reviewing possible motives for the murder, Koenig and her producers reason that, if Syed is innocent, he had extraordinarily bad luck. Syed's petition in the Court of Special Appeals is still alive but torn between two lawyers; he tells Koenig he will allow the Innocence Project to seek court approval to test the DNA found on Lee's body and a bottle found nearby. Koenig expresses her desire to avoid unsubstantiated speculation and to focus on only the facts. She concludes that from a legal perspective, she would have voted to acquit Syed, although she still nurses doubts.
13	"Adnan Is Out"	16:52	September 20, 2022

=== Season 2 (2015–16) ===
No. in season	Title	Length (minutes:seconds)	Original release date
1	"DUSTWUN"	44:24	December 10, 2015
Private Bowe Bergdahl left his U.S. Army post in Afghanistan in 2009, intending to hike about 20 miles to a larger command center and triggers a "DUSTWUN" manhunt. In telephone conversations with filmmaker Mark Boal, Bergdahl said he wanted to report poor leadership at his post and air grievances, but enemy fighters captured him within hours of his disappearance. Sarah Koenig will be using more of the 25 hours of recorded conversations between Bergdahl and Boal to tell his story.
2	"The Golden Chicken"	59:12	December 17, 2015
The capture of Bowe Bergdahl is recounted by Taliban members present that day and the weeks following. Other Army soldiers discuss the initial recovery efforts and their feelings about Bergdahl following his disappearance.
3	"Escaping"	54:18	December 24, 2015
Bergdahl said he tried to escape after he was captured, but his first attempt only resulted in about 15 minutes of freedom. He was chained spread-eagle to a bed and blindfolded for about three months. His next escape lasted only eight days, during which he was injured falling off a cliff in the dark. He remained in captivity until Special Forces picked him up in 2014.
4	"The Captors"	45:01	January 7, 2016
What was going on with the captors? Bergdahl's description of his captors is confusing, largely because his perspective was from inside a cage, inside a locked room. Koenig interviews David Rohde, another American held captive by the Haqqani network for about seven months, who had been abducted with two Afghan colleagues who could interpret what his captors were saying and doing.
5	"Meanwhile, in Tampa"	53:26	January 21, 2016
In 2009, the search for Bergdahl was in hands of two low-level personnel recovery intel analysts for Afghanistan, at CENTCOM in Tampa, not a division in-theater. Hostage recovery was not at the top of list of priorities for the CIA, NSA, or other intelligence agencies, and resources were consequently not available. Because Bergdahl was held in the Federally Administered Tribal Areas of Pakistan, there were also complicated diplomatic issues. In 2013, General John Campbell made it a top priority to recover Bergdahl, and Colonel Jason Amerine audited everything done in Bergdahl's case and in other hostage cases. Agencies such as CENTCOM, SOCOM, DOD, and the State Department seemed to hand off responsibility for recovering not just Bergdahl, but other American hostages as well, making a dysfunctional hostage recovery policy. Koenig observes that frustration was the central theme expressed by those she interviewed, who were struggling against competing interests and limits on what the U.S. is willing risk to get hostages back.
6	"5 O'Clock Shadow"	59:57	February 4, 2016
Sergeant Bowe Bergdahl gave a 380-page statement to General Kenneth Dahl, telling the story of his deployment and what happened when he walked away from his post. Bergdahl had been a good infantry soldier up until that point, who even volunteered for extra duty, a "squared away" soldier. He had become disillusioned at his first post in Alaska after basic training and found Army leadership to be lacking. The mission in Afghanistan was counterinsurgency and nation-building, but many soldiers expressed confusion over doing "humanitarian things," rather than seeking and destroying the Taliban enemy. Bergdahl wanted adventure and action, and was disappointed in his platoon's work. The platoon was assigned a rescue mission, but they were attacked on their return, in a firefight through a ravine, eventually limping back to the post with no losses, but they were upbraided for not shaving for six days. Bergdahl was angry about the battalion commander's misplaced priorities. Bergdahl wanted to "kill the bad guys", and do better at engaging the regular Afghans, but he felt the Army was not fulfilling its counter-insurgency mission. When the battalion was assigned to dig trenches near Moest in 110-degree heat of summer, the battalion commander aggressively berated them for being out of uniform, as a breakdown in discipline. Bergdahl was offended by the punishment, feeling the commander was incompetent, and out of control. He felt he had to cause a DUSTWUN to correct the situation. So was he selfish, or selfless?
7	"Hindsight, Part 1"	37:58	February 18, 2016
Has Bergdahl been telling the truth about his reasons for walking off base in Afghanistan, or just the version he could live with? Bergdahl says he left because Army leaders were dangerously bad. Dahl concluded Bergdahl's comments were truthful, that his motive was well-meaning, but based on incorrect assumptions. Mark Boal said Bergdahl's conclusions would make sense only to himself. Kayla Harrison described him as an unusual, smart, creative teenager, who forged his own strict, uncompromising moral code, who believed if you know something to be wrong in the world, you must take actions to correct it, and he was "impossibly unrealistic". He had romantic expectations, a rigid code of conduct, and a judgmental perspective. He joined the Coast Guard in January 2006, at age 19. Overwhelmed, he had been hospitalized after a panic attack, and a psychologist had assessed his "mental state significant for situational anxiety", recommending discharge with "diagnosis: adjustment disorder with depression". Bergdahl felt he was being judged by his family as a failure, a black sheep who would not do the right thing. In May 2008, to get a waiver to join the Army, he submitted a medical discharge statement that left out his panic attack, hospitalization, and the doctor's note that before re-enlisting in the military, he needed clearance by a psychiatrist. He did not tell anyone at home he was joining the Army. He just turned up one day in uniform. Kim Harrison said it was the worst idea ever. Koenig asks, "Should the Army have let Bowe in?"
8	"Hindsight, Part 2"	36:56	February 19, 2016
Did the Army screw up by accepting Bergdahl after his breakdown in Coast Guard basic training two years earlier? Dr. Elspeth Cameron Ritchie thought the Army waiver was not uncommon because information-sharing among different military branches is incomplete. Dr. Michael Valdevenos thought the Army recruiter should have scrutinized Bergdahl's record more thoroughly. Dahl concluded the recruiter had followed all procedures, but should have included review of his separation action. Mark Boal observed Bergdahl experienced the disillusion of someone who believes in the Army, who just wanted to talk to higher-ranking people in the military about improving command leadership. Bergdahl wanted to be the ideal soldier who fights for a cause he is committed to, who rallies behind trusted military leaders, with a code of honor, loyalty, and self-sacrifice. Bergdahl knew his expectations were unrealistic, but he still defended his vision of the way things should be. Bergdahl's June 27 broadcast e-mail to friends, "Who is John Gault?" referred to the industrialist in Atlas Shrugged, who shut down the world's economy in order to fix it. Dr. Christopher Lang diagnosed Bergdahl as having Schizotypal personality disorder. Valdevenos concurs that this diagnosis is accurate, describing people who are loners, lack close friends, with perceptual alterations and persistent social anxiety. Bergdahl's paranoia was worse under stress — he believed his commander might send them into a suicide operation. Koenig says this diagnosis makes his story more credible. His judgments about the commander may even be true, that American lives were put at risk to retrieve equipment. For Bergdahl, walking off base was not an absolute boundary, but it was not a rational thing to do. Maj. Margaret Kurtz, the court martial prosecutor, said at the time of his alleged misconduct, Bergdahl was able to appreciate the nature and quality and wrongfulness of his conduct. In other words, mental illness or no, he should be held responsible for his actions. Some soldiers thought Bergdahl's good intentions led to a bad "God-like" decision. Some thought he was lying; some thought he had good intentions, but they still could not forgive his actions. Others did not perceive there was danger in the reprimands, like Bergdahl did. His platoon was deeply hurt by his actions. Platoon members would die for each other, and because of that, they had become family together. Bergdahl's actions made them feel their whole deployment lost its meaning. Almost all the soldiers he served with thought he should go to court martial.
9	"Trade Secrets"	48:46	March 3, 2016
The U.S. State Department engaged in secret peace negotiations in Munich in 2010 with the Taliban that included a "confidence building" condition: trade Bergdahl for two prisoners at Guantanamo. But negotiator Richard Holbrooke died before political reconciliation could be achieved. There was a brief hopeful moment with new negotiator Mark Grossman, but then there was stagnation for months, and no progress seemed possible. In May 2011, the Taliban walked away from the talks. Then their demands escalated to include release of five GItmo prisoners, including Mullah Faisal. Setbacks included leaks, bad timing, and "old fashioned screw-ups", including the 2011 assassination of former Afghan president Rabbani. In June 2013 a new Taliban office opened with the flag of the Islamic Emirate, in violation of the agreement with Karzai and U.S. representative James Dobbins. The word "emirate" was also on the wall of the building, which infuriated Karzai. The Taliban withdrew from peace talks, and Bergdahl stayed in captivity for another year. The Pakistan Army was gearing up to bomb Pakistani Taliban in Waziristan, and the U.S. had begun withdrawing troops, so prospects for Bergdahl's release were diminishing. Bergdahl's physical condition was deteriorating. U.S. officials, including Chuck Hagel, negotiated through Qatar, finally negotiating a deal for Bergdahl's release in exchange for the five Taliban prisoners at Guantanamo. On Saturday, May 31, 2014, word finally came that Bergdahl was safe and the trade could proceed. It was a transaction, not part of a larger peace negotiation. The Bergdahls had been assured that their son would not face charges, that his time with the Taliban was punishment enough, so they thought it was over, mission accomplished. Not quite.
10	"Thorny Politics"	51:36	March 17, 2016
When Koenig questions people about what bothers them about Bergdahl's case, most say that it has become so political. Was it inevitable that it became so combative? Susan Rice characterized his service with "honor and distinction", which angered the military. Soldiers in his platoon said he walked away, and some from his unit started a "He's not a hero" Facebook page. Fox News interviewed soldiers from Bergdahl's platoon and the story became a juggernaut, with bogus intel from a discredited source even saying Bergdahl had become a Muslim and wanted to be a warrior for Islam. The political right was using the story and the platoon for political purposes, trying to bait President Barack Obama because they had been offended by the Rose Garden ceremony, which they characterized as "a tone-deaf move" on the part of the White House. The President did not recognize the irregularities of Bergdahl's story of or questions about his disappearance, and there was no attempt to get to the bottom of the story. Why did the White House make such a mistake, instead of using an earlier plan to have a quiet event? In retrospect, it was important for the President to own the decision and explain the policy behind it. By law, Congress must be given 30-day notice before Guantanamo detainees are released, but the Department of Defense had taken the lead on the trade, and had not told Congress anything. Leaks could have derailed the fragile deal, jeopardizing Bergdahl's life. Congressional staffers felt they could no longer believe anything from DOD: first, where there had been a collegial relationship before, there was now "unprecedented, profound concern about national security risk…" Second, who signed off on the trade of five Taliban? Third, were they safe to release from Gitmo? The public anger at Bergdahl is personal, wrapped in larger questions about negotiating with terrorists. As a result of this anger, the Republican congress changed the legal wording on Gitmo foreign transfer language, creating a stricter standard as a direct result of the Bergdahl trade, and the administration not telling Congress the truth. Bergdahl also had a lengthy stay in Germany, where "SERE" experts (Survival, evasion, resistance, escape) from the military community planned Bergdahl's reintegration, and debriefs took weeks. Bergdahl was unaware he had become a subject of national interest. One important question has not been addressed: there has been no official report or investigation of whether people died or were injured in the search for Bergdahl.
11	"Present for Duty"	65:05	March 31, 2016
Questions remain about Bergdahl's case. First, people with him during Coast Guard boot camp did not understand how could have enlisted in the Army, given their graphic recollections of his breakdown, which was not a "garden variety panic attack". General Kenneth Dahl wrote that Bergdahl's Coast Guard separation should have been examined more closely. Koenig summarizes: the Army messed up, Bergdahl messed up walking off base, and then there were five years with the Taliban. But that leaves out the reckoning desired by the military. They want an accounting. What was Bergdahl's fault, and what was not? General Michael Flynn, formerly head of the Defense Intelligence Agency, says authoritatively people died on missions to find Bergdahl. But the evidence is not so clear, in spite of the six names from the 501st battalion on missions to find DUSTWUN that have been cited in the media. Other soldiers in his unit were convinced that finding Bergdahl was part of all their missions following his disappearance, so the six deaths were connected to Bergdahl. Some cited resources dedicated to finding him that were not then available to other operations. Sergeant Major Ken Wolfe, however, advised looking "at a map and a timeframe", meaning after 45+ days, Bergdahl was in Pakistan. No infantry unit would be deployed to look for Bergdahl, as it would have required special forces. But what about second- and third-order consequences of his desertion? Wolfe dispels these arguments as "speculation and hypothetical". Perhaps the mission to find Bergdahl was the top cover to justify other unrelated missions the Army units needed to accomplish, as an excuse to gain assets and permission to "get outside the wire". Flynn points out they did not have bullet-proof intelligence on where Bergdahl was. But resources were diverted and people were injured and suffered because of looking for Bergdahl. Who is to blame for variables causing the deaths and injuries in wars? The country signed up for all the things attending war, including disillusioned youth and failing Army recruiting systems. Mark Boal's remaining question: what is an appropriate punishment for Bergdahl, who did not intend to cause harm? The Army treats most deserters who walk away from a base as headcases because it is so dangerous. Ambivalence about Bergdahl reflects societal confusion about the wars in Iraq and Afghanistan, as well as the war on terror. Bergdahl is still a soldier, now classified as "present for duty". He has an office job at a base in San Antonio, waiting for the Army to decide his fate, just waiting — which he knows how to do.

=== Season 3 (2018) ===
No. in season	Title	Length (minutes:seconds)	Original release date
1	"A Bar Fight Walks into the Justice Center"	54:00	September 20, 2018
Anna, a young woman at a bar, is repeatedly harassed by being slapped on the butt by men she does not know. The harassment eventually results in a bar fight where law enforcement gets involved and Anna accidentally ends up assaulting an officer. With the fight started by men harassing Anna, why is she the only one getting arrested? This episode covers her case from the pretrial until she eventually pleads guilty, just like over 96% of the cases in the Justice Center Complex.
2	"You've Got Some Gauls"	57:00	September 20, 2018
A profile of Judge Daniel Gaul and his questionable sentencing methods that seem to be based on his biased opinion. The episode also examines how judges have the powers to sentence people based on their personal beliefs about the justice system.
3	"Misdemeanor, Meet Mr. Lawsuit"	63:00	September 27, 2018
A young African American, Emirius Spencer, is assaulted by two police officers in his apartment building for possession of marijuana. Later in the episode, one of the officers who participated in beating Spencer, Michael Amiott, is involved in another incident where the beating of an African American motorist takes place.
4	"A Bird in Jail is Worth Two on the Street"	60:45	October 4, 2018
Episode four explores the stigma around not trusting the police in a community and the death of five-month-old Avielle Wakefield who was shot in 2015. Although the man convicted of the crime, Davon Holmes, has a criminal past, he claims he is not guilty of this crime. Later, Avielle's father is interviewed and claims that he and everyone else in his community know Holmes is not guilty of the shooting, but no one will come forward because they do not want to be involved with law enforcement.
5	"Pleas Baby Please"	61:31	October 11, 2018
Episode 5 discusses the power of prosecutors and what motivates them to make the decisions they make. Koenig follows Brian Radigan, a respected prosecutor, as he negotiates a plea deal.
6	"You in the Red Shirt"	51:44	October 18, 2018
A profile on Jesse Nickerson, a man beaten by the cops and as a result of his trial, got them sentenced to prison. The episode follows Nickerson after the fact and highlights how his life has been altered since the incident. Arnold Black, also beaten by cops on his way home, is thrown into a cell with no food or human contact for several days and no one knows he is there. The episode highlights the corruption and abuse of power of the criminal justice system in Cleveland.
7	"The Snowball Effect"	56:09	October 25, 2018
This episode returns to Emirius Spencer, the man beaten for possession of marijuana, who may be suffering from a brain injury from the incident. Whether or not the punishments of the people mentioned are fair comes into question.
8	"A Madman's Vacation"	65:39	November 8, 2018
Part one of the two-part finale discusses the juvenile justice system and the adverse affects incarceration can have on youth in the criminal justice system.
9	"Some Time When Everything Has Changed"	50:43	November 15, 2018
Part two of the two-part finale concludes by following Joshua, a minor convicted of several crimes, as he moves from the juvenile detention center to the county jail.

=== Season 4: Guantánamo (2024) ===
No. in season	Title	Length (minutes:seconds)	Original release date
1	"Poor Baby Raul"	41:41	March 28, 2024
2	"The Special Project"	47:10	March 28, 2024
3	"Ahmad the Iguana Feeder"	60:49	April 4, 2024
4	"The Honeymooners"	52:16	April 11, 2024
5	"The Big Chicken, Part 1"	54:44	April 18, 2024
6	"Part 2, Asymmetry"	56:31	April 25, 2024
7	"The Forever Reporter"	63:27	May 2, 2024
8	"Two Ledgers"	61:06	May 9, 2024
9	"This is the Weirdness"	62:37	May 16, 2024

== Development and release ==
The concept for Serial originated with an experiment in Koenig's basement. Koenig and Snyder had pitched a different idea at a staff meeting for a weekly program on events during the previous seven days, which staff members received without enthusiasm. When Ira Glass asked Koenig if she had any other ideas, she mentioned podcasting a story that unfolded over time, a serialized narrative. In an interview with Mother Jones, she explained that each episode would return to the same story, telling the next chapter of a long, true narrative.

Episode one of the series was released on October 3, 2014, with additional episodes released weekly online. Glass introduced it as a spinoff of his popular radio program, This American Life, and aired episode one on his show. He explained, "We want to give you the same experience you get from a great HBO or Netflix series, where you get caught up with the characters and the thing unfolds week after week, but with a true story, and no pictures. Like House of Cards, but you can enjoy it while you're driving."

=== Music ===
Nicholas Thorburn released the soundtrack for Serial on October 17, 2014. It includes 15 tracks, all short instrumentals, and is available at the Bandcamp site or streamed from several reviewing sites.

Mark Henry Phillips, who mixes the show, has also provided original scores.

Musical credits for Season 2 include Thorburn and Phillips, as well as Fritz Myers and staff music editor Kate Bilinski.

=== Funding ===
Serial's launch was sponsored by Mailchimp, a frequent podcast advertiser, and salaried staff positions were initially funded by WBEZ. Admitting the podcast was funded from This American Life's budget during the launch, producer Koenig noted that Serial would eventually need to generate its own funding. She said, "Everyone's saying 'It's podcasting! It's internet! Of course there'll be money somewhere.' We're not exactly sure yet." Dana Chivvis, another producer, observed that, since the industry is still in its infancy, a business model for podcasting has yet to be established.

Towards the end of the first season, producers asked for public donations to fund a second season. Within a week, the staff of Serial posted an announcement that a second season has been made possible by donations and sponsorship.

In July 2020 Serial Productions (the company behind the Serial podcast) was acquired by The New York Times. Techcrunch reported that the deal was valued at $25 million and noted that Sarah Koenig and Julie Snyder would become Times employees as a result of the sale.

== Reception ==
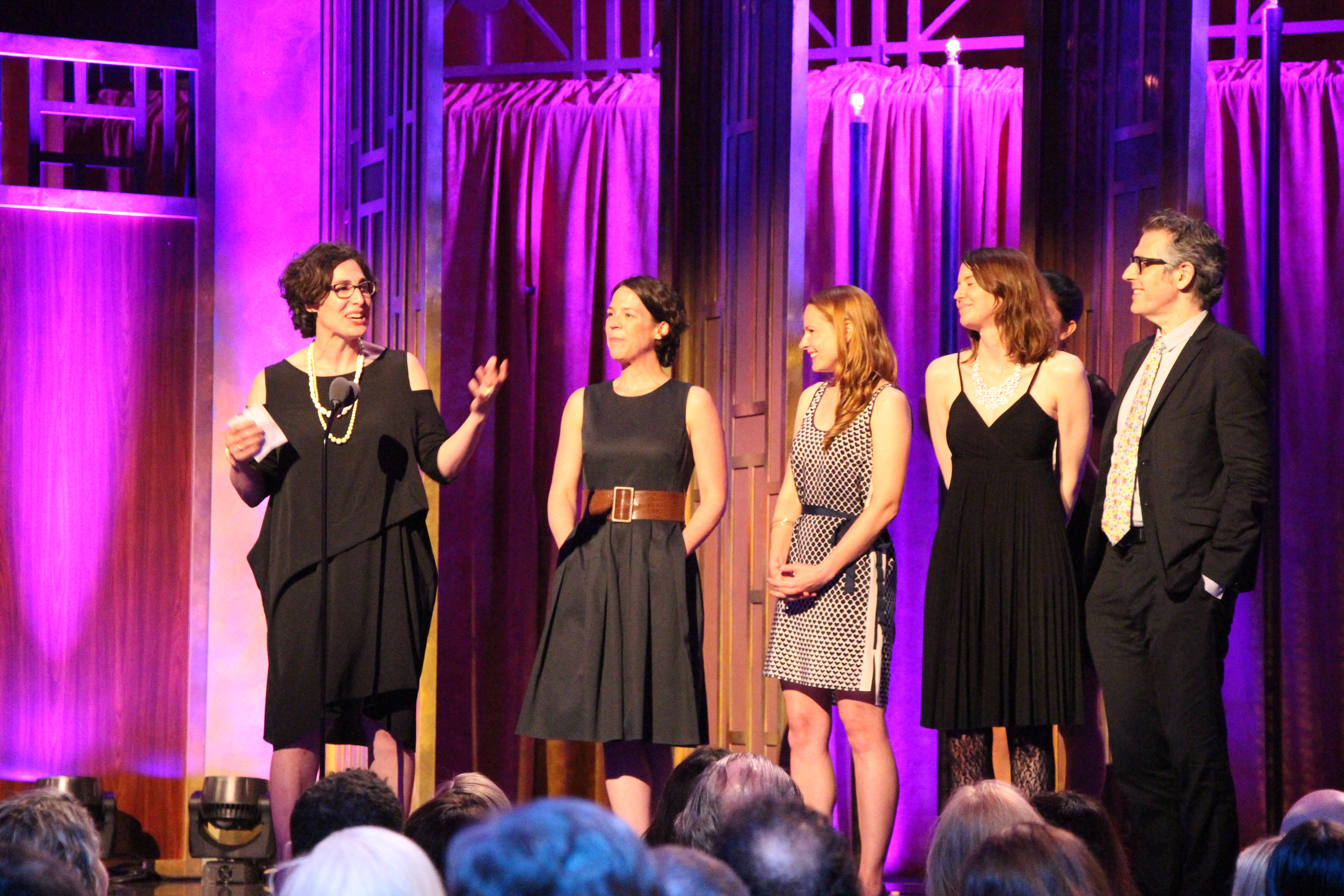
Host and Executive Producer Sarah Koenig accepts the Peabody Award for Serial. She is joined on stage by Julie Snyder, Dana Chivvis, Emily Condon, Cecily Strong and Ira Glass.

=== Season 1 (2014) ===
The first season of Serial was both culturally popular and critically well received. Serial was ranked at No. 1 on iTunes even before it debuted, leading iTunes rankings for over three months, well after the first season ended. It also broke records as the fastest podcast ever to reach 5 million downloads at Apple's iTunes store. David Carr in The New York Times called Serial "Podcasting's first breakout hit." The Guardian characterized it as a "new genre of audio storytelling".

Introducing a PBS NewsHour segment about Serial, Judy Woodruff noted that it is "an unexpected phenomenon", and Hari Sreenivasan mentioned it has "five million downloads on iTunes, far more than any other podcast in history".

Calling the characters "rich and intriguing", The Daily Californian noted similarities to the film The Thin Blue Line (1988), and described the podcast as "gripping" and the story as "thrilling", while applauding the series for giving "listeners a unique opportunity to humanize the players".

Slate's reviewer pointed out that Serial is not escapist and went on to note: "Someone in the show is not telling the truth about something very sinister. That's the narrative tension that makes Serial not only compelling but also unlike anything I can remember watching or reading before." The Baltimore Sun commented on the inherently riveting subject matter and noted that the top-notch reporting and podcast format yield "a novel twist on the investigative long-form piece".

A critique from the journalism community was more qualified. First noting that some people believe there is a "podcast renaissance", the reviewer from Harvard's Nieman Journalism Lab observed that even though podcasts are not new, they are not yet mainstream.

Not all critiques of the podcasting format have been as equivocal. PopMatters observed that podcasting is a new distribution model, very different from television as a distribution model because it gives users access to media and the freedom to listen to episodes of a long-form story while doing other things. The reviewer applauded the focus on long-form journalism and added, "Suddenly you feel like the full promise of podcasting has just been unleashed. That long-form narrative nonfiction is really the way to best leverage the potential of podcasting as a distribution model."

Multiple reviews have commented on the addictive nature of Serial. A review in New York Magazine linked fans' feelings about the possibility of an ambiguous ending with their psychological need for closure. Reddit hosts a Serial subreddit site. Slate is also "following the story closely" and presents a podcast discussion of Serial every week following the latest release.

Several reviews have criticized the ethics of Serial, notably the decision to start broadcasting without the reporting having been finished. Critics said the "live investigation" format invited listeners to do their own sleuthing, which quickly led to exposure online of the full names and even addresses of people who were questioned by the police. Another point of debate was whether it was legitimate to use the murder of Hae Min Lee as a subject for entertainment.

Sarah Koenig's reporting has also been criticized as being biased in favor of Adnan's innocence, and Katy Waldman's Slate blog noted that some felt Serial undercut Adnan's detractors. An Atlantic roundtable discussion noted that the podcast forces the listener to consider Koenig's "verification bias", the tendency to seek answers that support her own biased assumptions, and that "even a well-meaning narrator isn't always credible".

One critic asserted that Koenig presented the story of a murder involving two minority teenagers and their cultures through a lens of white privilege, "a white interpreter 'stomping through communities that she does not understand' ". A rejoinder in The Atlantic pointed out, "Serial is a reflection on a murder case and the criminal-justice system reported over 'just' a year, which is to say, it is researched with more effort and depth than 99 percent of journalism produced on any beat in America... Most of all, the response to mistakes should never be to discourage white reporters from telling important stories."

Serial was honored with a Peabody award in April 2015, noting "Serial rocketed podcasting into the cultural mainstream", and that it was an "experiment in long-form, non-fiction audio storytelling". It was cited for "its innovations of form and its compelling, drilling account of how guilt, truth, and reality are decided". Dr. Jeffrey P. Jones, Director of the Peabody Awards, commented the podcast showed "how new avenues and approaches to storytelling can have a major impact on how we understand truth, reality, and events".

In an interview with Jon Ronson for The Guardian, Syed's mother Shamim and younger brother Yusuf both said they listened to the podcast and that people sent transcripts to Syed in prison. Yusuf said the podcast had indirectly reconnected the family to his estranged brother Tanveer for the first time in the 15 years since the murder.

Three "update" mini-episodes of Serial were posted during Syed's post-conviction hearing in February 2016, coinciding with the run of Season Two. They received limited attention from critics, although Slate's review notably described them as "ragged, chaotic entries [which] can't help but hit us as shadows of what was."

An HBO docuseries based on the Serial podcast entitled The Case Against Adnan Syed was released in March 2019.

=== Season 2 (2015–16) ===
The much-anticipated second season of Serial was released in December 2015. The subject of Season 2 was met with widespread skepticism. Vastly different from the popular murder-mystery story that Season 1 investigated, Season 2's focus on the story behind the U.S. soldier Bowe Bergdahl, who disappeared from his post in Afghanistan in 2009 before being captured by the Taliban and subsequently released in 2014, was contentious due in part to the controversial views of the soldier's departure from his post and also because of the high-profile court martial proceeding for his alleged desertion.

The Guardian summarized the season by saying Koenig and her team managed to add to the conversation: "Not only did they let Bergdahl speak for himself, via a series of interviews with the film-maker Mark Boal, but they also asked and answered a question that no one – including the military or the US government – had seemingly bothered to investigate." Season 2 of Serial was less about solving a mystery and more about long-term investigative reporting and storytelling. Zach Baron of GQ Magazine reported that he liked the season overall and thought it gave an invaluable document of what it is like to serve in modern wars, but said it was also "something of a cultural disappointment, at least compared to last season."

Similar to Season 1's critical response, some felt that the lack of answers was "infuriating."

Switching to a bi-weekly schedule mid-season caused some to believe the series was losing momentum. However, in an interview with Entertainment Weekly, Sarah Koenig and executive producer Julie Snyder said the download numbers for Season 2 were 50 million, higher than the numbers were by the time Season 1 ended.

=== Season 3 (2018) ===
Season 3 received mostly positive reviews. Andrew Liptak at The Verge called it a "return to form". Nicholas Quah at Vulture called it "ambitious, addictive, and completely different".

Season 3 was tied for the 2019 Media for a Just Society Award in radio by the NCCD.

=== Awards ===
Award	Date	Category	Recipient	Result	Ref.
Ambies	2022	Governors Award	Serial	Won	
Edward R. Murrow Award	2017	News Series	Serial	Won	
Edward R. Murrow Award	2017	Website	Website	Won	
Edward R. Murrow Award	2019	News Series	Season three	Won	
Peabody Awards	2014	Podcast & Radio	Serial	Won	
Alfred I. duPont–Columbia University Award	2016	Podcast	Season one	Won	
Shorty Awards	2015	Podcast	Serial	Won	
Shorty Awards	2023	Innovative Media Buying Strategy	MailChimp and Serial	Finalist	
Shorty Awards	2023	Real Time Response	MailChimp and Serial	Finalist	
Webby Awards	2023	Advertising, Media & PR	MailChimp and Serial	Honoree	
Webby Awards	2019	Best Series	Serial	Won	
Webby Awards	2019	Crime & Justice	Season three	Nominated	
Webby Awards	2019	Best Host	Season three	Nominated	
Webby Awards	2019	Best Writing	Season three	Won	
iHeartRadio Podcast Awards	2019	Podcast of the Year	Serial	Nominated	
iHeartRadio Podcast Awards	2019	Most Bingeable Podcast	Serial	Nominated	
NCCD Awards	2019	Radio	Season three	Tied	

== Related podcasts ==
The popularity of Serial and the intrigue of the case it covered has spawned several companion podcasts, such as Crime Writers on Serial, The Serial Serial, and Undisclosed: The State vs. Adnan Syed, the latter produced by Rabia Chaudry. S-Town, a 2017 collaboration between the teams of This American Life and Serial, was released to mixed reviews. Also, Nice White Parents and The Improvement Association were yet other related podcast. The Coldest Case in Laramie was produced by Serial Productions in 2023.

== Parodies ==
Parodies of Serial have targeted the show's style, its fans' obsessive tendencies, Koenig's curiosity and uncertainties, the charts and graphics posted on the show's website, and the podcast's sponsor MailChimp (especially the meme "MailKimp").

- The New Yorker ran a cartoon based on Serial.
- When Koenig appeared on The Colbert Report, Colbert noted that the finale of Serial would be released in competition with Colbert's last episode.
- Saturday Night Live spoofed Serial with a sketch investigating Kris Kringle, who for years has allegedly been leaving presents in people's homes.
- As part of the promotion for the video game Halo 5: Guardians, developer 343 Industries put out a multi-part, in-universe podcast called Hunt the Truth, investigating the history of the series protagonist, the Master Chief, John-117. Narrated by comedian Keegan-Michael Key as fictional reporter Benjamin Giraud, it is delivered in the style of the Serial podcast, including the narration delivery style of Sarah Koenig and audio style of her in-person and over-the-phone interviews.
- Funny or Die released a short video starring Michaela Watkins as a frantic Koenig—unsure of how she will end the series—recording the final episode of Serial. The video mimics Serial's style, including asides to the audience demarcated by the Serial theme music. The "Mail Kimp" and "Crab Crib" memes are referenced in the popular video, which had over 880,000 views as of October 2015, placing it in the website's "Immortal: Best of the Best" video category.
- In the summer of 2015, Under the Gun Theater developed an improvised show format entitled One Story Told Week by Week which satirized Serial. According to Chicago Tribune writer, Nina Metz, the host parodied Koenig's "distinctively intimate and inquisitive vocal delivery," as well as contained moments that satirized the podcast's "attempt at amateur sleuthing."
- Sarah Koenig made a cameo appearance in an episode of the animated comedy series BoJack Horseman as a ringtone, parodying her introduction to episodes of the podcast.
- In November and December 2016, Secrets, Crimes and Audiotape was a radio drama anthology podcast series by Wondery that had a five-episode story arc in the form of a musical satire of Serial's Season One, called Wait, Wait, Don't Kill Me. In this so-called "first-ever serialized podcast musical", young struggling reporter Sarah Koenig is possibly involved in Hae Min Lee's murder and her covering the story boosts her career and leads to her cooperation with Ira Glass. The story among other things also makes extended use of the MailKimp meme.
- The 2017 Netflix series American Vandal is a mockumentary that parodies the true crime genre in general, and Serial specifically; the characters in American Vandal even acknowledge the similarities to Serial in the fourth episode of the show.
- Scream and Trial & Error both featured a podcast host visiting a small town in the aftermath of a murder.
- In 2018, The Onion began the parody podcast A Very Fatal Murder, which aimed to satirize the true crime genre of podcasts.
- In the 2021 Hulu series Only Murders in the Building, the main characters listen to a true crime podcast called All is Not Okay in Oklahoma, a parody of Serial with Tina Fey playing the Sarah Koenig equivalent, Cinda Canning.

== See also ==
- List of American crime podcasts
