= Woodlawn High School (Maryland) =

Location
- 1801 Woodlawn Dr; Baltimore, Maryland 21207; United States; 39°18′54″N 76°44′06″W

Information
- Type: Public; High School; Magnet School
- Motto: "Witness the Change!" and "Don't Talk About It Be About It!"
- Established: 1961
- School district: Baltimore County Public Schools
- Grades: 9–12
- Classes offered: Magnet program
- Campus: Urban
- Campus size: 55 acres (220,000 m^{2})
- Colours: Black; Red
- Mascot: Warriors
- Feeder schools: Johnnycake Elementary School; Edmondson Heights Elementary School; Woodbridge Elementary School; Chadwick Elementary School; Woodmoor Elementary School; Featherbed Lane Elementary School; Powhatan Elementary School; Hebbville Elementary School; Dogwood Elementary School; Windfield Elementary School; Bedford Elementary School; Milbrook Elementary School; Wellwood International Elementary School; Southwest Academy; Woodlawn Middle School; Windsor Mill Middle School; Pikesville Middle School
- Website: woodlawnhs.bcps.org
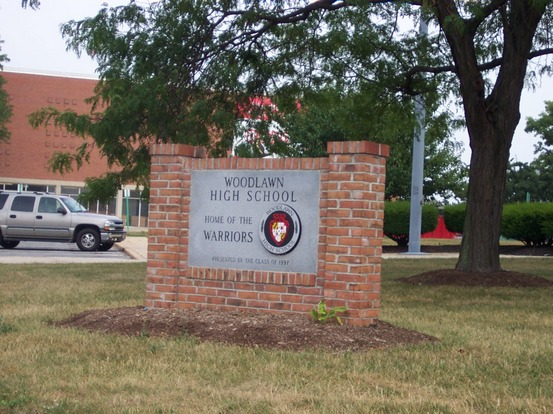

Woodlawn High School (WHS) is a four-year public high school in Woodlawn, Baltimore County, Maryland, United States. The school opened in the fall of 1961. Prior to that, students in the area attended Catonsville, Milford Mill, or Franklin High Schools. In the fall of 2017, Woodlawn offered an Early College Program to help students prepare for university education.

There are over 40 various extracurriculars, sports, programs, and activities for students.

== Location ==
Woodlawn High School sits on 55 acres (220,000 m^{2}) in western Baltimore County. The main building, which was built in 1961, is roughly 195,000 square feet (18,100 m^{2}) in size. The school is located just east of the Baltimore Beltway and north of Maryland Route 122, Security Boulevard.

Woodlawn High School's district borders the districts of Pikesville High School, Randallstown High School, Milford Mill High School, and Catonsville High School in Baltimore County.

== Academics ==
Woodlawn High school received a 37.8 out of a possible 100 points (37%) on the 2018–2019 Maryland State Department of Education Report Card and received a 2 out of 5-star rating, ranking in the 11th percentile among all Maryland schools.

== Magnet Programs ==
Woodlawn High School offers 2 magnet programs for students who looking for college preparatory programs that will help them succeed at a good college to get a good career for their future.

Magnet Programs

- Early College
- Engineering (PLTW)

== Students ==
The 2025 – 2026 enrollment at Woodlawn High School was 1922 students.

The graduation rate at Woodlawn High School over the past 15 years peaked in 1999 at 98% and dropped to 89% in 2006. In 2025, the graduation rate fell again to 81%.

Woodlawn High School is one of the largest high schools in the Baltimore County Public School system.

As of 2026, the school is 66% African-American, 22% Hispanic and Native American, 5% Asian/Pacific Islander, 3% White, and 2% European-American. Almost 13% of the students receive special education, and over 66% of the students receive free or reduced lunches, one of the highest rates in the county.

Student population
1993	1994	1995	1996	1997	1998	1999	2000	2001	2002	2003	2004	2005	2006	2007	2008	2009	2010	2011	2012
1,553	1,527	1,492	1,368	1,403	1,526	1,651	1,686	1,780	1,827	1,896	1,983	2,028	1,990	1,937	1,877	1,767	1,641	1,634	1,504

== Athletics ==
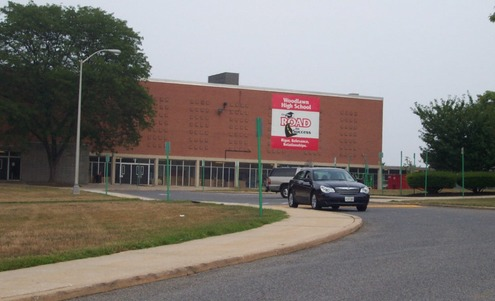
Woodlawn High School

=== State championships ===
Volleyball

- Class AA 1982

Boys Indoor Track

- Class AA 1987, 1988
- 3A-2A 1998

Baseball

- Class AA 1986

Boys Outdoor Track and Field

- Class AA 1987, 1988
- Class A 1998

== Notable alumni ==
- Carlton Bailey, NFL linebacker for Buffalo Bills, New York Giants, and Carolina Panthers
- Calvin Ball III, county executive of Howard County
- Charles Belfoure, architect and writer
- Regina T. Boyce, Maryland House of Delegates, 43rd District, Baltimore City.
- Keion Carpenter, NFL safety for Buffalo Bills and Atlanta Falcons
- Joan Cassis, photographer
- Ta-Nehisi Coates, writer for The Atlantic
- Robert Curbeam, NASA astronaut on Space Shuttle Atlantis
- Corey Fuller, NFL wide receiver for Detroit Lions
- Vincent Fuller, NFL safety for Tennessee Titans
- Hae Min Lee, murder victim, and Adnan Syed, convicted of the murder and subject of the first season of Serial
- Kevin Liles, music executive; former president of Def Jam Records
- Tavon Rooks, American football player
- Joni Eareckson Tada, Christian Author and evangelical leader
- Krishanti Vignarajah, lawyer; former senior advisor at the State Department; former Policy Director to Michelle Obama
- Thiruvendran Vignarajah, lawyer; clerk to Supreme Court Justice Stephen Breyer; Assistant United States Attorney for Maryland
- Torrance Zellner, track and field athlete; bronze medals winner at the 1991 and 1999 Pan American Games

== See also ==
- List of Schools in Baltimore County, Maryland
