= Murder of Hae Min Lee =

1999 homicide in Baltimore, Maryland, US

Killing of Hae Min Lee
- Yearbook photo of Hae Min Lee (이해민), the murder victim, from Woodlawn High School
- Location: Leakin Park, Baltimore, Maryland, United States
- Date: January 13, 1999 (disappearance); February 9, 1999 (discovery of corpse)
- Attack type: Murder by manual strangulation after kidnapping
- Victims: Hae Min Lee, aged 18
- Charges: Syed: First-degree murder; Kidnapping; False imprisonment; Robbery; Wilds: Accessory after-the-fact to first-degree murder
- Verdict: Guilty on all counts
- Sentence: Syed: Life imprisonment plus 30 years; resentenced to time served in March 2025; Wilds: 5-year suspended sentence, plus 2 years probation
- Convicted: Adnan Masud Syed; Jay Wilds (as an accessory)

Hae Min Lee (Korean: 이해민; October 15, 1980 – January or February, 1999) was a Korean-American high school student who went missing on January 13, 1999, in Baltimore County, Maryland, before turning up dead on February 9, 1999, when her corpse was discovered in Leakin Park, Baltimore. Her autopsy revealed that she had been killed by way of manual strangulation.

Amidst an ongoing investigation by the Baltimore Police Department, Lee's ex-boyfriend Adnan Masud Syed (Urdu: عدنان مسعود سید; born May 21, 1981) was arrested on February 28, 1999, and put on trial for homicide. He was found guilty on all counts for the charges of kidnapping, false imprisonment, robbery, and first-degree murder; Syed was sentenced to life in prison plus 30 years. Syed's friend Jay Wilds had confessed and pleaded guilty to being an accessory to the murder and was given a five-year suspended sentence. In 2014, the investigative journalism podcast Serial covered the events of Lee's killing, bringing renewed attention to Syed's case. In 2016, judge Martin P. Welch vacated Syed's conviction and ordered a new trial. While this decision was upheld by the Maryland Court of Special Appeals in 2018, it was ultimately overturned by the Maryland Court of Appeals in 2019.

Following an investigation by prosecutors that uncovered new evidence, a judge again vacated Syed's conviction in September 2022. In October 2022, prosecutors announced that the charges against Syed had been dropped. However, in March 2023, Syed's conviction was reinstated by an appellate court, although the court stayed the effective date of the decision for 60 days. In August 2024, the Supreme Court of Maryland, in a 4–3 decision, reinstated the murder conviction against Syed and ordered a new hearing to address the merits of dismissing Syed's conviction. In March 2025, Judge Jennifer Schiffer resentenced Syed to time served, with the conviction remaining reinstated.

== Background ==
Hae Min Lee was born in South Korea in 1980 and emigrated with her mother Youn Kim and her brother Young Lee to the United States in 1992 to live with her grandparents. Lee attended the magnet program at Woodlawn High School in Baltimore County, Maryland. She was an athlete who played lacrosse and field hockey.

Lee's family reported her missing on January 13, 1999, after she failed to pick up her younger cousin from daycare. She had last been seen by fellow students at her high school around 2:15 p.m. On that day, police officers called various friends of Lee to try to find her. They reached Adnan Syed, a former boyfriend, around 6:30 p.m.; he said the last time he saw her was around the time classes ended at school. At 1:30 a.m., they reached her then-current boyfriend who said he had arrived home at 7 p.m. On February 6, a dog-led search was conducted around Woodlawn High School.

Lee's partially buried body was discovered by Alonzo Sellers in Leakin Park in Baltimore on February 9. On February 12, the Baltimore City Police Homicide Division received an anonymous phone call suggesting that investigators focus on Syed. One of Syed's friends, Jay Wilds, told the police that Syed had expressed intentions of killing Lee and stated that he had helped Syed bury Lee's body after Syed confessed to killing her on January 13. Wilds took a plea deal to accessory to murder, and his testimony would ultimately be heavily relied upon in the state's criminal case against Syed.

Baltimore Police applied for cellular-phone records for a phone belonging to Syed on February 16. Syed was arrested on February 28, and charged with first-degree murder.

== Trials and conviction ==
Syed's family hired defense attorney Cristina Gutierrez to represent him. Syed's first trial began in December 1999, but ended in a mistrial after jurors overheard a sidebar dispute between Gutierrez and the presiding judge; Gutierrez interpreted a statement by the judge as tantamount to accusing her of lying and said as much — unaware that members of the jury were within earshot.

Syed's second trial began in January and lasted six weeks. On February 25, 2000, the jury found Syed guilty of first degree murder, kidnapping, false imprisonment, and robbery. Syed was sentenced to life in prison plus 30 years. Syed's family immediately fired Gutierrez following the verdict. Syed unsuccessfully appealed his conviction.

== Post-conviction-relief petition ==
Syed sought post conviction relief in May 2010, alleging ineffective assistance of counsel. Syed argued that Gutierrez had failed to investigate an alibi witness, Asia McClain, who maintained she was talking with Syed in the library at the exact time that prosecutors said Syed attacked Lee in a Best Buy parking lot several miles away. In January 2014, the petition was denied by Justice Martin Welch, who found that Gutierrez's failure to call McClain as a witness was strategic rather than an act of incompetence because McClain's timeline was not consistent with Syed's stated timeline.

Syed subsequently filed a motion seeking leave to appeal in the Court of Special Appeals. The court granted that motion and remanded the case to the circuit court, instructing the circuit court to consider reopening Syed's application for post-conviction relief in light of an affidavit filed by McClain. With the circuit court, Syed filed a supplement asking for a reexamination of the cell-tower evidence that was used in his trial.

On November 6, 2015, Judge Welch re-opened Syed's post-conviction relief proceedings. The post-conviction relief hearing, originally scheduled to last two days, lasted five days from February 3 to February 9, 2016. The hearing was attended by people from across the United States, including Sarah Koenig. Asia McClain testified that she talked to Syed at the library on January 13, 1999. On June 30, 2016, Welch granted Syed's request for a new trial and vacated his conviction, ruling that Gutierrez "rendered ineffective assistance when she failed to cross-examine the state's expert regarding the reliability of cell tower location evidence". Welch denied Syed's defense team's motion for bail for Syed in the interim.

On March 29, 2018, the Maryland Court of Special Appeals, the second-highest court in the state, upheld Syed's request for a new trial. The Court of Special Appeals' opinion said that Syed's counsel failed to contact a potential alibi witness who could "have raised a reasonable doubt in the mind of at least one juror". Prosecutors and Attorney General Brian Frosh asked the Court of Special Appeals to reverse the lower court's ruling, and argued that "Syed's defense attorney did a thorough job and the witness, Asia McClain, would not have changed the outcome of the case."

The prosecution appealed to the Supreme Court of Maryland (then called the Maryland Court of Appeals, the highest court in the state). On March 8, 2019, in a split 4–3 ruling, the high court reversed the findings of the lower courts, denying Syed's request for a new trial. While the majority agreed Syed's legal counsel was deficient for failing to pursue alibi witnesses, they found "there [was] not a significant or substantial possibility that the verdict would have been different had trial counsel presented" such a witness. They said that McClain's account "does little more than call into question the time that the state claimed Ms. Lee was killed and does nothing to rebut the evidence establishing Mr. Syed's motive and opportunity to kill Ms. Lee". Finally, the court ruled that Syed had waived his right to re-examine the validity of the cellphone tower evidence because the issue had not been raised as part of his original petition.

On November 25, 2019, the Supreme Court of the United States rejected Syed's appeal for a new trial. Maryland Attorney General Brian Frosh responded to the Supreme Court's decision by stating "the evidence linking Syed to Lee's death is 'overwhelming'" and in a statement: "We remain confident in the verdict that was delivered by the jury and are pleased that justice for Hae Min Lee has been done".

== Serial podcast ==
From October 3 to December 18, 2014, the murder of Hae Min Lee and the subsequent arrest and trial of Adnan Syed was the subject of the first season of the podcast Serial. It was developed by the creators of This American Life and hosted by Sarah Koenig. The podcast episodes generated international interest in the trial and were downloaded more than 100 million times by June 2016.

=== Follow-up media ===
In 2015, attorneys Rabia Chaudry, Susan Simpson, and Collin Miller began producing a podcast, Undisclosed: The State vs. Adnan Syed. Chaudry said she is Syed's friend from childhood and strongly believes in his innocence, while Simpson and Miller became interested in the case from listening to Serial. This podcast involved a detailed examination of the State of Maryland's case against Adnan Syed. Simpson also persuaded Abraham Waranowitz to sign an affidavit stating his original testimony was incorrect; he had been an expert witness in relation to cellphone locations.

Investigation Discovery aired a one-hour special, Adnan Syed: Innocent or Guilty? on June 14, 2016. Its findings were based on a new analysis of evidence brought up in the podcasts.

In 2016, two books were published about the case. Confessions of a Serial Alibi, written by Asia McClain Chapman, was released on June 7, 2016. Adnan's Story: The Search for Truth and Justice After Serial, written by Rabia Chaudry, was released on August 9, 2016.

In May 2018, HBO announced it would produce a four-hour documentary based on the murder case called The Case Against Adnan Syed. The first part of a four-part series was released on March 10, 2019. The HBO documentary revealed that Syed turned down a plea bargain in 2018 that would have required him to plead guilty in exchange for a shortened sentence.

In a February 2016 statement, Lee's family said they remained convinced of Syed's guilt, adding that it was now "more clear than ever" that he killed their daughter.

== Post-conviction DNA testing ==
After Serial ended in 2014, there were discussions by the Innocence Project about conducting DNA testing of the physical evidence collected in 1999. Documents obtained by The Baltimore Sun in early 2019 show that Maryland prosecutors tested multiple items tied to the murder in mid-2018 and Syed's DNA did not match any of the DNA present.

On March 10, 2022, the Baltimore City State's Attorney signed on to a motion filed by Syed's defense attorney, Erica J. Suter, requesting that the court order new DNA testing on Lee's clothing, shoes, and rape kit. The joint motion stated that those items had never been tested for DNA. On March 14, a city judge ordered that the Baltimore police send evidence to the Forensic Analytical Crime Lab in Hayward, California, within 15 days.

== Vacatur and reinstatement of conviction ==
In 2014, Marilyn Mosby was elected Baltimore City State’s Attorney on a platform of criminal justice reform, and with a record of scrutinizing past convictions for potential misconduct. In April 2021, attorneys for Syed brought his case to the attention of Mosby’s Sentencing Review Unit, a body established by her office to reexamine lengthy sentences imposed on juvenile offenders. The review expanded into a broader reinvestigation of the underlying conviction. In September 2022, prosecutors filed a motion to vacate Syed's conviction. According to the motion, the State had committed Brady violations by failing to turn exculpatory evidence over to Syed during the course of his trial, and prosecutors had since uncovered new evidence that cast doubt on Syed's conviction. The motion cited two Brady violations: First, it said that the prosecution had suppressed evidence related to other potential suspects. Second, it said that the prosecution had failed to disclose the identity of a suspect who had previously threatened Lee's life and had the means, motive, and opportunity to kill Lee. The motion detailed that there were two chief alternate suspects: one of the suspects had threatened to kill Lee; Lee's car was found parked behind a house in Baltimore that belonged to one of the suspects; and one of the two was convicted of serial rape after Syed's trial. Finally, the motion expressed concerns about the reliability of the cell-phone records and witness testimony used at the trial.

The motion to vacate was partially based on a note by former prosecutor Kevin Urick; a line from that note was quoted in the motion: "He told her that he would make her disappear; he would kill her." But Urick said the motion had misinterpreted his note: that "he" did not refer to an alternative suspect, but to Syed himself. Urick also provided a re-created transcript of the call that the note was based on. The State's Attorney's Office released a statement accusing Urick of attempting to "save face" by "now attributing the threats to Adnan Syed", pointing out that the threats had not been "used at any of Mr. Syed's previous trials." Further, the statement claimed that the State was "well aware of the person and the circumstances surrounding the call that was made" and emphasized that the note was "not the only document relied upon by the court to find a Brady violation".

On September 19, Circuit Court Judge Melissa Phinn vacated Syed's conviction. He was released from prison the same day. Prosecutors subsequently filed nolle prosequi with the court to drop all charges against Syed. Young Lee, Hae Min Lee's brother, appealed the decision, arguing that, as a victim, he had not been given sufficient notice of the hearing and that he had not been given an adequate opportunity to speak or testify.

On March 28, 2023, Syed's conviction was reinstated by the appellate court in a 2-1 decision. The panel acknowledged that Judge Phinn had given Young Lee the opportunity to address the court during the hearing, even though Maryland law did not expressly confer the right to speak to victims. But it separately found that Lee was owed, and not given, sufficient notice as would allow him to attend the hearing in person. Finally, the decision faulted prosecutors for failing to "state in detail" the reasons to throw out Syed's conviction, noting that the motion "did not identify the two alternate suspects or explain why the State believed those suspects committed the murder without Mr. Syed". In a dissenting opinion, Judge Stuart Berger argued that the appeal was moot, since the charges against Syed had been dropped, and that Lee's rights had not been violated. The decision sparked debate over the appropriate scope of victims' rights in innocence cases.

In late April 2023, Syed asked the appeals court to reconsider its decision, arguing that court had based its conclusion on an issue of procedure that did not affect the outcome of the lower-court ruling. The appellate court denied the motion, saying that it was based on an argument that was not raised during the original consideration. Syed appealed the case to the Maryland Supreme Court, which stayed the reinstatement pending the resolution of the appeal before reinstating Syed's murder conviction on August 30, 2024. In addition, the Maryland Supreme Court also ordered redo of the vacatur hearing which lead to Syed's release, with Syed remaining released from prison pending the new hearing's outcome.

On February 25, 2025, Baltimore State's Attorney Ivan Bates announced that his office was withdrawing a previously filed motion to vacate Syed's conviction. Bates however said he supported Syed's motion for a reduced sentence under the state's Juvenile Restoration Act, which provides a pathway to release for people serving long prison terms for crimes committed when they were minors. (Syed was 17 when Lee was killed.) After a lengthy hearing on February 26, Judge Jennifer Schiffer said she had "very heavy considerations" to weigh and said she would issue a written decision about the sentence reduction. On March 6, Schiffer issued a decision that reduced Syed's sentence to time served so that the conviction would stand but that Syed would remain free.
