= Hope (given name) =

- Pronunciation: /hoʊp/
- Gender: Unisex (more common for females)

Origin
- Origin: Old English
- Meaning: the virtue of hope
- Region of origin: English-speaking countries

Other names
- Related names: Amal, Elpida, Elpis, Esperanza, Nadezhda, Nadia, Nadine, Omid, Shprintza, Shprintze, Shprintzel, Spes, Tikvah, Nada

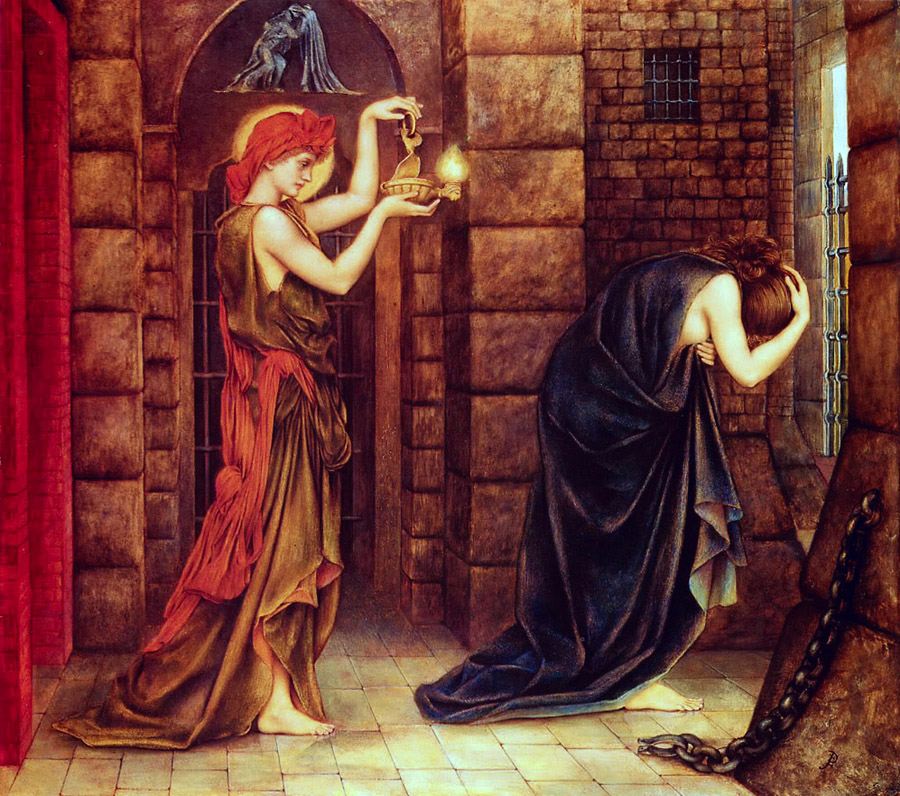
Hope in a Prison of Despair, by Mary Evelyn de Morgan, depicting Hope as a woman or very young man holding a lamp, representing the comfort brought by religious faith

Hope is a given name derived from the Middle English hope, ultimately from the Old English word hopian referring to a positive expectation or to the theological virtue of hope. It was used as a virtue name by the Puritans. Puritans also used Hope as an element in phrase names, such as Hope-for, Hopeful, and Hope-still.

The name is also the usual English translation of the Greek name of Saint Hope, an early Christian child martyr who was tortured to death along with her sisters Faith and Charity. She is known as Elpis in Greek and Spes in Church Latin and her name is translated differently in other languages.

Faith, Hope and Charity, the three theological virtues, are names traditionally given to triplet girls, just as Faith and Hope remain common names for twin girls. There were 40 sets of twins named Faith and Hope born in the United States in 2009, the second most common name combination for twin girls. One example were the American triplets Faith, Hope and Charity Cardwell, who were born in 1899 in Texas and were recognized in 1994 by the Guinness Book of World Records as the world's longest lived triplets.

Hope has been among the top 1,000 names given to girls born in the United States since 1880 and has been among the top 500 since 1909. It was ranked as the 231st most popular name for girls born in 2011 in the United States, down from its peak ranking of No. 144 in 1999. The name Hope is also given to males, but it's usually given to girls.

== Women ==
- Hope Emily Allen (1883–1960) American medievalist, historian, scholar, and writer
- Hope Anderson (born 1988), American beauty queen
- Hope Andrade (born 1949), American businesswoman, former Secretary of State of Texas
- Hope Bender (born 1997), American athlete
- Hope Booth (1878−1933), Canadian-born vaudeville, burlesque, and theatre actress
- Hope Bourne (1918–2010), English writer
- Hope Boykin, American dancer
- Hope Breslin (born 1999), American soccer player
- Hope Clarke (born 1941), American actress, choreographer, dancer, and director
- Hope Cooke (born 1940), American socialite, former Queen Consort of the King of Sikkim
- Hope Darst (born 1980), American Christian musician
- Hope Davis (born 1964), American actress
- Hope Hendren Duke, American politician
- Hope Dworaczyk (born 1984), American Playboy model, TV host and reality television personality
- Hope Edelman (born 1964), American non-fiction author
- Hope Tisdale Eldridge (1904–1991), American statistician, demographer
- Hope Emerson (1897–1960), American actress
- Hope Garber (1924–2005), Canadian actress and singer
- Hope Gangloff (born 1974), American painter
- Hope Giselle (born 1993), American transgender activist and author
- Hope Goddard Iselin (1868–1970), American heiress and sportswoman
- Hope Hale Davis (1903–2004), American feminist author
- Hope Hambourg (1902–1989), British violinist
- Hope Hampton (1897–1982), American actress and singer
- Hope Hibbard (1893–1988), American biologist, cytologist, and zoologist
- Hope Hicks (born 1988), American pr executive, White House Director of Strategic Communications for President Trump
- Hope Hillier (1891–1980), British actress and longtime chairman and managing director of Topham Ltd
- Hope Hilton, American Mormon writer
- Hope Hisey (born 2001), American soccer player
- Hope Holiday (born 1938), American actress
- Hope Hope-Clarke (1870–1950), British charity campaigner
- Hope E. Hopps (1926–1988), American microbiologist and immunologist
- Hope Jahren (born 1969), American geobiologist
- Hope Lange (1933–2003), American actress
- Hope Larson (born 1982), American illustrator and cartoonist
- Hope Leyba (born 2005), American soccer player
- Hope Loring (1894–1959), English screenwriter
- Hope Baldwin McCormick (1919–1993), American socialite, philanthropist, and politician, part of the McCormick family
- Hope McIntyre, Canadian playwright and artistic director
- Hope Muir, Canadian dancer, rehearsal director and teacher
- Hope Munro (born 1981), Australian field hockey player
- Hope Mwesigye (born 1956), Ugandan lawyer and politician
- Hope A. Olson (born 1942), American Information studies scholar
- Hope Partlow (born 1988), American pop singer
- Hope Portocarrero (1929–1991), American socialite and First Lady of Nicaragua
- Hope Powell (born 1966), English international football coach and former player
- Hope Rampy, American Major General
- Hope Ralph (born 2000), New Zealand field hockey player
- Hope Rogers (born 1993), American rugby union player
- Hope Rugo, American oncologist and professor of medicine
- Hope Sabanpan-Yu, Philippine story writer and poet
- Hope Sandoval (born 1966), American singer-songwriter
- Hope Sandrow (born 1951), American conceptual artist
- Hope Segoine, Korean-American singer known for a popular version of the song Baby Shark
- Hope Skillman Schary (c. 1908–1981), American textile designer
- Hope Harmel Smith, American television producer and writer
- Hope Elizabeth Soberano (born 1998), better known as Liza Soberano, Philippine actress
- Hope Solo (born 1981), member of the United States women's national soccer team
- Hope Summers (1896–1979), American actress
- Hope Tala (born 1997), British singer and songwriter
- Hope Taft, former First Lady of Ohio, member of the Taft Family
- Hope Temple (1859–1938), Irish composer and songwriter
- Hope Thompson, Canadian writer
- Hope Trautwein (born 1999), American softball player
- Hope Hill Van Beuren, American billionaire
- Hope Walz (born 2001), daughter of Minnesota governor and former Democratic Party Vice President nominee Tim Walz
- Hope Morgan Ward (born 1951), American Methodist bishop
- Hope Weiler, Canadian nutritionist
- Hope Whitehead (born 1959), American politician
- Hope Winch (1894–1944), English pharmacist

== Men ==
- Hope Akpan (born 1991), English professional footballer
- Hope Atherton (c. 1646–1677), colonial clergyman
- Hope Avayevu (born 2002), Ghanaian professional footballer
- Hope Bagenal (1888–1979), British architectural theorist and acoustician
- Hope Chisanu (born 1983), Malawian actor, politician and radio personality
- Hope Collins (1904–1980), Australian rules footballer
- Hope Crisp (1884–1950), English tennis player
- Hope Eghagha (born 1959), Nigerian professor
- Hope Evans (1902–1991), Australian rules footballer
- Hope Ezeigbo (born 1958), Nigerian sprinter
- Hope Gibbons (1856–1947), New Zealand businessman, philanthropist, and politician
- Hope Gill, Indian bishop
- Hope Grant (1808–1875), British Army officer
- Hope Hines, American sports director
- Hope Hull (minister) (1763–1818), American minister
- Hope Fleming Mackenzie (1821–1866), Canadian cabinet-maker, shipbuilder, and politician
- Hope Papo, South African politician
- Hope Patten (1885–1958), Anglo-Catholic priest
- Hope Robertson (1868–1927), Scottish footballer
- Hope Sadler (1882–1931), American football player
- Hope H. Slatter (1790–1853), American slave trader
- Hope H. Slatter II (1841–1900), Confederate-American heir
- Hope Stevens (1905–1982), American lawyer, political and civic activist, and businessman
- Hope Uzodimma (born 1958), Nigerian politician
- Hope Masterton Waddell (1804–1895), Irish medical missionary
- Hope Woodson, brother of Jacqueline Woodson

== Fiction ==
- Hope, new supporting character of Siren in which she is the daughter of mermaid Ryn. She debuts in "Life and Death" and returns in "A Voice in the Dark"
- Hope Bauer, in the American soap opera Guiding Light
- Hope Bennett, a character on the TV show The Walking Dead: World Beyond
- Hope Williams Brady, in the American soap opera Days of Our Lives
- Hope Diyoza, daughter of Charmaine Diyoza that first appeared in Season 6 Finale of The 100 (TV series) & then as a regular in Season 7
- Hope van Dyne, in the Marvel Comics universe
- Hope Estheim, main male child character from the video game, Final Fantasy XIII, and recurring in its sequels, Final Fantasy XIII-2 and Lightning Returns: Final Fantasy XIII
- Hope Swan Jones, a character on show Once Upon a Time
- Hope Logan, a character on the American soap opera, The Bold and the Beautiful
- Hope Manning-Thornhart, a child character on the American soap opera, One Life to Live
- Hope Mikaelson, a character on CW's show The Originals
- Hope Pym, a supervillain and superhero in Marvel Comics 2 and the Marvel Cinematic Universe, first appearing in A-Next in 1999.
- Hope Summers, a superhero in Marvel Comics, first appearing in X-Men in 2007
- Hope Stape, a child character on English soap Coronation Street
- Hope Quentin Wicker-Adiyodi, a baby character on SyFy's show The Magicians, daughter of Julia Wicker and William "Penny" Adiyodi
- Hope Williams Brady, a character on the American soap opera, Days of Our Lives
- Hope Adams Wilson, a former character on the American soap opera, The Young and the Restless
- Hope (Xena), in the TV series Xena: Warrior Princess
