= Charity (name) =

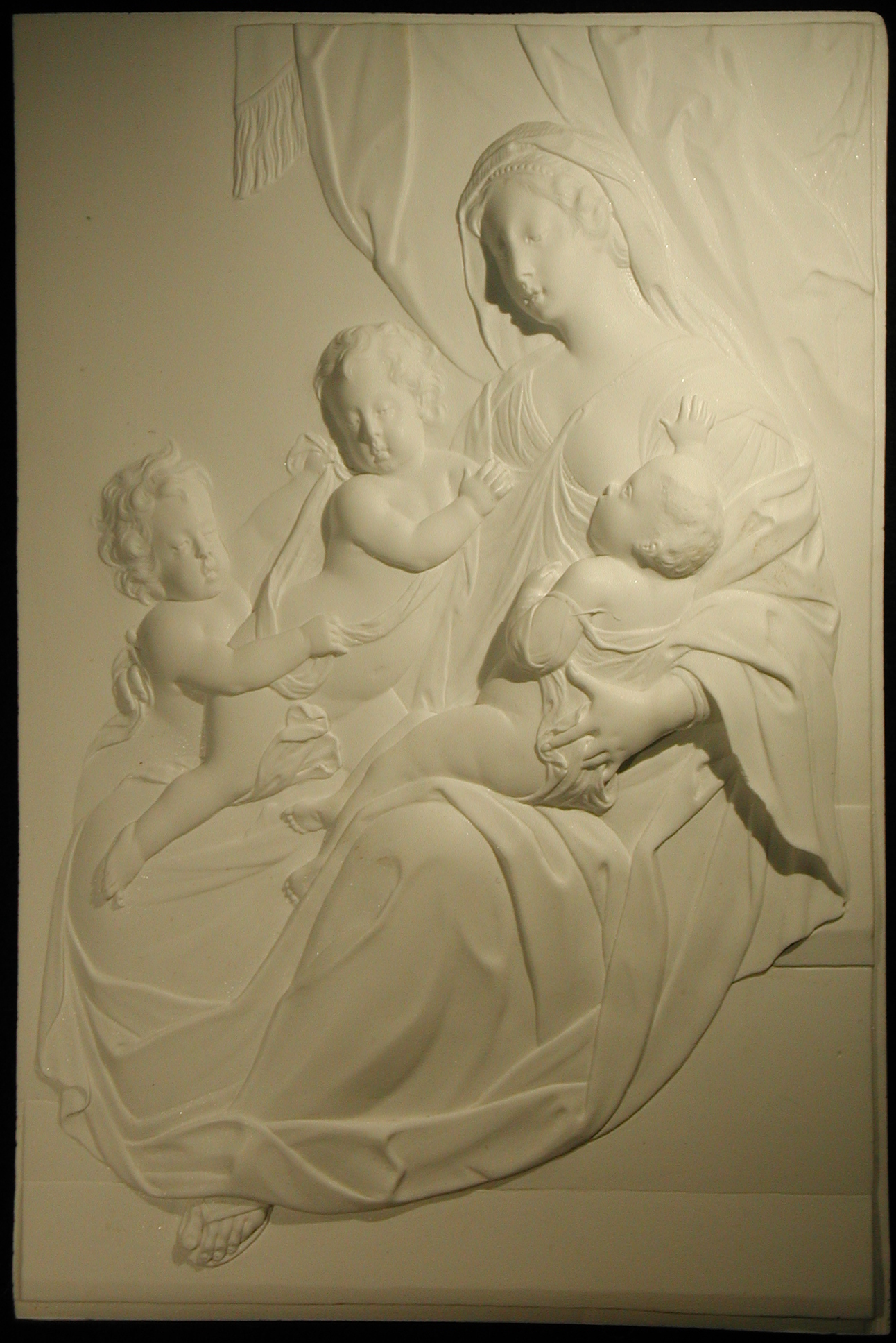
- "Caritas"
- Gender: Female

Origin
- Origin: English via Latin
- Meaning: Charity
- Region of origin: English-speaking countries

Charity is an English feminine given name derived from the English word charity. It was used by the Puritans as a virtue name. An earlier form of the name, Caritas, was an early Christian name in use by Romans.

Charity is also the usual English form of the name of Saint Charity, an early Christian child martyr, who was tortured to death with her sisters Faith and Hope. She is known as Agape in Biblical Greek and as Caritas in Church Latin and her name is translated differently in other languages.

Faith, Hope and Charity, the three theological virtues, are names traditionally given to triplet girls, just as Faith and Hope remain common names for twin girls. One example were the American triplets Faith, Hope and Charity Cardwell, who were born in 1899 in Texas and were recognized in 1994 by the Guinness Book of World Records as the world's longest lived triplets.

Charity has never been as popular a name in the United States as Faith or Hope. It ranked in the top 500 names for American girls between 1880 and 1898 and in the top 1,000 between 1880 and 1927, when it disappeared from the top 1,000 names until it reemerged among the top 1,000 names in 1968 at No. 968. It was most popular between 1973 and 1986, when it ranked among the top 300 names in the United States. It has since declined in popularity and was ranked at No. 852 in 2011.

This is a list of people and characters named Charity:

== People ==
- Charity Aiguobarueghian (born 1976), Nigerian politician
- Charity Anderson (born 2000), American dancer
- Charity Adule (born 1993), Nigerian footballer
- Charity Angya, Nigerian vice chancellor
- Charity Bainababo (born 1975), Ugandan general
- Charity Bick (1925–2002), English civilian dispatch rider during the Second World War and youngest ever recipient of the George Medal
- Charity Brown (born 1951), Canadian film actress and singer
- Charity Bryant (1777–1851), American writer
- Charity Kathambi Chepkwony, Kenyan politician
- Charity Cherop (born 2007), Ethiopian long-distance runner
- Charity Clark, American politician
- Charity Wright Cook (1745–1822), American Quaker minister
- Charity Rusk Craig (1849–1913), American organizational leader
- Charity Daw, American singer-songwriter
- Charity Ekezie, Nigerian TikToker and journalist
- Charity Elliott (born 1969), American basketball team coach
- Charity Adams Earley (1918–2002), African-American officer
- Charity Gaye Finnestad (born 1973), American author
- Charity Hufnagel (born 2001), American athlete
- Charity Kase (drag queen) (born 1996), British drag performer
- Charity King, American politician
- Charity Lamb (1818–1879), American murderer
- Charity Mucucuti (born 1983), Zimbabwean rugby union player
- Charity Basaza Mulenga (born 1979), Ugandan electrical engineer
- Charity Nebbe (born 1975), American host
- Charity Ngilu (born 1952), Kenyan politician, Minister of Health from 2003 until 2007 and Minister of Water and Irrigation from 2008 to 2013
- Charity Opara (born 1972), Nigerian former sprinter
- Charity Reuben (born 2000), Nigerian footballer
- Charity Scott (1951–2023), American professor
- Charity Shea (born 1983), American actress
- Charity Still (c. 1775 – 1857), American matriarch
- Charity Taylor (1914–1998), English medical doctor
- Charity Sunshine Tillemann-Dick (1983–2019), American soprano and presenter
- Charity Waciuma (born 1936), Nigerian novelist
- Charity Wakefield (born 1980), English actress
- Charity Wayua (born 1985), Kenyan chemist
- Charity Williams (born 1996), Canadian Olympic athlete
- Charity Zisengwe (born 1997), Zimbabwean inspirational speaker
- Charity Zormelo (1904–1945), Ghanaian first woman graduate from the Gold Coast and first woman from English-speaking West Africa to earn a B.S. degree

== Fictional characters ==
- Charity Dingle, in the British soap opera Emmerdale
- Charity Standish, in the soap opera Passions
