= Climate of Istanbul =

Istanbul (Kireçburnu, Sarıyer)

Climate chart (precipitation, max. and min. temperature)
J	F	M	A	M	J	J	A	S	O	N	D
96 9 4	88 9 4	70 12 5	45 16 8	37 21 13	45 26 17	36 28 20	44 28 21	81 25 17	98 20 14	101 15 9	125 11 6
- █ Average max. and min. temperatures in °C
- █ Precipitation totals in mm
- Source: NOAA
Imperial conversion
J	F	M	A	M	J	J	A	S	O	N	D
3.8 48 38	3.5 49 38	2.7 54 41	1.8 61 47	1.5 70 55	1.8 78 63	1.4 82 69	1.7 83 70	3.2 76 63	3.9 68 56	4 59 49	4.9 51 42
- █ Average max. and min. temperatures in °F
- █ Precipitation totals in inches

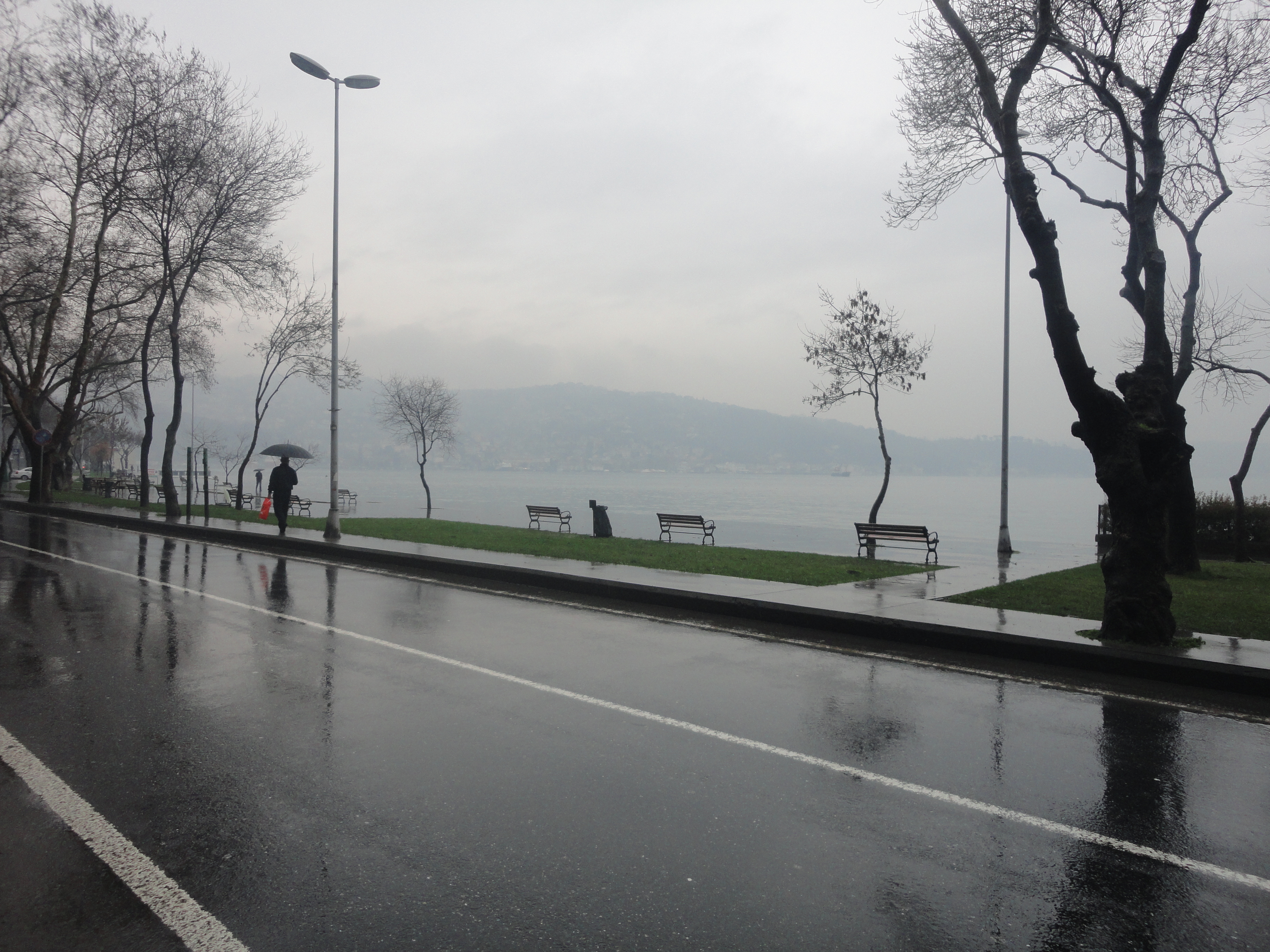
A view of the Bosporus from Kireçburnu, mid-winter.

The climate of Istanbul, classified variously as Mediterranean, oceanic, or a transitional climate between the two, is temperate, with cool, frequently rainy, somewhat snowy winters, and warm to hot, moderately dry summers. Strongly influenced by the Sea of Marmara to the south and the Black Sea to the north, it is thoroughly maritime; precipitation is moderately high, fog is frequent, and seasonal lag is noticeable both in winter and in summer. The city is sheltered from both extreme heat and frigid temperatures, with temperatures rarely reaching 33 °C (91 °F) or dipping below −6 °C (21 °F), and it is quite windy year-round.

Precipitation is unevenly distributed, with winter typically experiencing very frequent precipitation, while summers are generally dry, punctuated by infrequent showers. Cloudiness also varies drastically by season; while the city has winters that receive around one–fifth of the possible sunshine duration, comparable to cities in northwestern Europe, in summer, the city gets considerably more sunshine than most of Western and Central Europe.

Istanbul's climate is rapidly changing due to the combined effects of climate change and the city's urban heat island. Recent data shows an immense increase in daily low temperatures and some increase in daily highs.

== General climate ==
=== Temperature ===
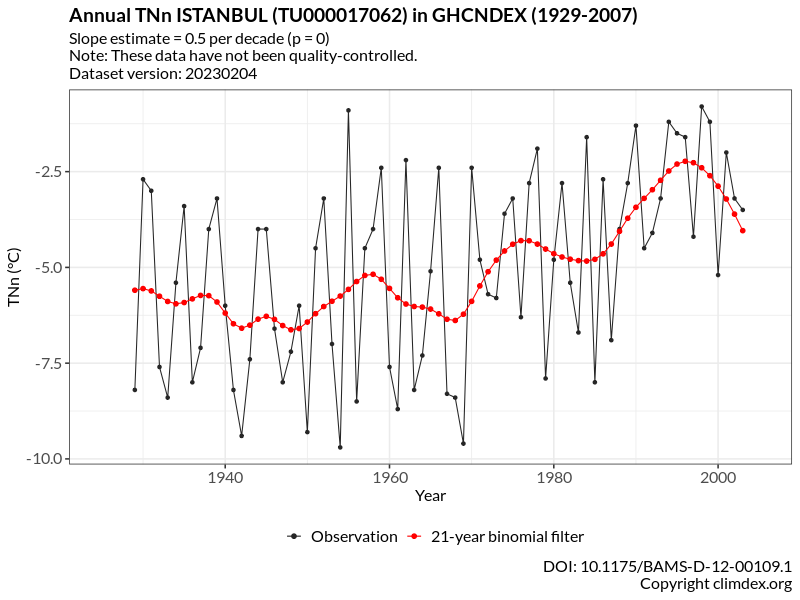
A graph showing the lowest temperature recorded annually in Göztepe, Kadıköy from 1929 to 2003. Note the faster increase post-1980, due to both climate change and Istanbul's urban heat island.

Istanbul's average temperature is based on the latest normals covering 1991-2020, around 14 °C (57 °F). Its coldest month is usually February, with an average temperature of 5–6 °C (41–43 °F), while its warmest month is usually August, with an average temperature of 23–24 °C (73–75 °F). Unsurprisingly, Istanbul's temperature range is narrow for a non-oceanside locale; the annual mean maximum (hottest temperature in an average year), is about 33 °C (91 °F), while the annual mean minimum (coldest temperature in an average year) is about −6 °C (21 °F). Istanbul's climate is also well known for its noticeable seasonal lag; it is one of the few cities in the temperate Northern Hemisphere where March is, in many districts, colder than December.

Summers in the city are dominated by stable, northeasterly meltem-like air, with a narrow range of daytime temperatures, generally around 25 °C (77 °F) to 32 °C (90 °F). A temperature of 38 °C (100 °F) is only seen about once every ten years. Despite this, Istanbul's summer climate is generally considered as relatively uncomfortable, largely due to persistently high dew points; most thermal comfort indices rate July and August as less comfortable overall than June and September.

Winters are more variable, still with relatively stable daytime temperatures generally around 2 °C (36 °F) to 14 °C (57 °F), but with abrupt, short-term extremes. The dominant northeasterly loses its dry quality during this time of year, giving way to a more moist wind, termed Poyraz (ultimately from Ancient Greek: Βορρᾶς, romanized: Borrhâs) from the same direction, causing persistent precipitation, sometimes in the form of snow; although it is still incapable of producing extreme cold due to its maritime nature. The Lodos (ultimately from Ancient Greek: Νότος, romanized: Nótos) is the southwesterly, warm, and dry wind "competing" with the northeasterly Poyraz and is responsible for the occasional day above 15 °C (59 °F) (Note: In northern parts of the city, Lodos functions as a Foehn wind, which can raise temperatures further to around 20 °C (68 °F) in rare occurrences.) in the city, as well as numerous severe windstorms. Therefore, while warmth records in winter are usually associated with and always colloquially blamed on the Lodos, cold records are the product of rare windless nights.

Spring and fall are mild, especially by the end of spring and the beginning of fall. Spring is generally colder than fall due to seasonal lag: March is quite chilly, much more akin to winter, in contrast to November's milder average temperatures. The last spring frost generally happens around late March in the most coastal and heavily urbanized areas, and late April well-inland; the first fall frost happens sometime in November in most of the city (except the far western suburbs, which may get their first frost in October), and early December in coastal locations.

It is somewhat well-established that summer mean temperatures have risen from about 20–22 °C (68–72 °F) during pre-industrial times to about 23–25 °C (73–77 °F) over the last two centuries, according to reconstructions done by Luterbacher et al. The same pattern is not found to the same extent in winter, where temperatures have seen no perceptible increase until very recently. This points to the combined effect of climate change and the urban heat island, which increases in intensity during the nights of the city's largely sunny summer days, and on hot summer days may create temperature differences of up to 8 °C at night, essentially creating a 4-5 °C difference between urban and rural areas.

=== Wind ===
Istanbul is quite windy, with average yearly wind speeds of 18–36 km/h (11–22 mph) depending on location. It is quite anomalous for a city that is not on the immediate west-coast of a continent. These high averages are not caused by frequent windstorms; however, they are rather caused by the near-constant north-northeasterly wind over the city (specifically the etesians in summer, and the Poyraz in winter) that all but eliminates windless days and causes around 30 days with sustained wind speeds above 57 km/h (35 mph) per year.

Although rare, Istanbul can experience severe windstorms, mostly due to Lodos in winter, when the typical wind flow reverses and becomes southwesterly. These have, historically, created gusts of up to 150 km/h (93 mph). Most years, however, see gusts up to 80–100 km/h (50–62 mph), which rarely causes more than sporadic damage.

=== Precipitation ===
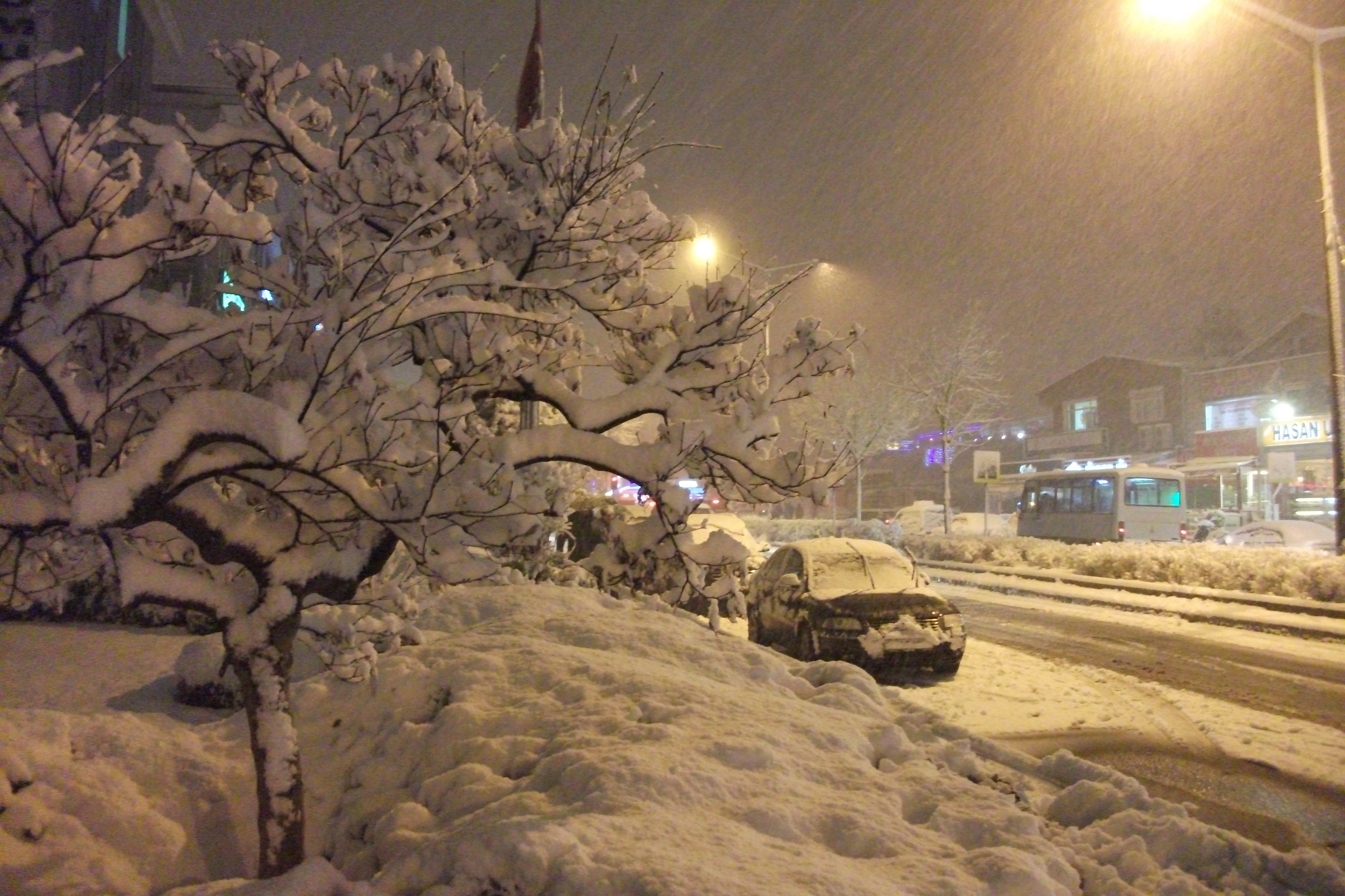
Severe snowstorms are not uncommon in Istanbul. As of 2024, the winter storm of January 2022 remains the latest storm to cause accumulations above 30 centimetres (1 ft) of snow in the entire city. This photo is, however, from an earlier, 2012 event.

Istanbul's precipitation varies considerably between years and districts. On average, however, it experiences around 800 millimetres (31 in) of precipitation annually. Most of this falls in the colder half of the year, with around 100 millimetres (4 in) to 150 millimetres (6 in) of precipitation in the wettest months. In the driest months, precipitation ranges from 10 millimetres (0.4 in) to 75 millimetres (3 in) depending on location, month and year, with prolonged dry periods punctuated by abrupt, heavy showers and thunderstorms, sometimes severe.

As Istanbul receives some amount of precipitation from both Atlantic and Mediterranean systems, precipitation, especially in the winter half of the year, is frequent and light, which is unusual for the Mediterranean basin: the average number of rainy days in the city is 131, and in some parts this may reach up to 152. Furthermore, during early and mid-winter, the city's frequency of precipitation is virtually unparalleled in the Mediterranean basin: January averages 20 days of precipitation when counting trace accumulations, 17 when using a 0.1 mm threshold, and 12 when using a 1.0 mm threshold, on par with cities such as Brussels, and rainier than famously humid locales in Western Europe, such as London.

Rain remains the dominant form of precipitation throughout the year, with snow representing only one fourth of precipitation even in the coldest months of January and February. Despite this, an annual average of more than 60 centimeters (24 in) of snow falls on the area of the airport, making Istanbul the snowiest major city in the Mediterranean basin. Snowfall varies widely between years and different areas of the city, with districts facing north more prone to receive snow than southerly ones. This effect is largely caused by lake-effect snow, which forms when cold air, originating from the North Pole or Siberia, develops into moist and unstable air that ascends to form snow squalls along the lee shores of the Black Sea, upon contact with the relatively warm water. These snow squalls are heavy snow bands and occasionally thundersnows, with accumulation rates approaching 5–8 centimeters (2–3 in) per hour. Almost half of snowy periods do not leave accumulated snow for more than a day, reducing the 'number of days with snow cover' statistic, published daily by the TSMS, by half.

Particularly severe winter storms have included January 1942, March 1987, and most recently January 2017 and 2022. Some of these broke daily snow depth (Note: Not snowfall, as these are not published officially.) records, with 80 centimeters (2.6 ft; 31 in) on 4 January 1942, and 104 centimeters (3.41 ft; 41 in) in the northern suburbs on 11 January 2017; unofficial measurements in hilly and northern regions have included 85 centimeters (2.79 ft; 33 in) in March 2022, and a putative measurement of 4 meters (13 ft; 160 in) in some snow drifts in March 1987.

Normally uncommon precipitation types, especially graupel (Turkish: Kar paleti, lit. 'Snow pellets', colloquially: Bulgur, lit. 'Grains of cracked wheat' or Kuzudişi, 'Deciduous teeth') are a staple of winter due to insufficient cooling of the southern Black Sea, somewhat well known internationally for delaying a Champions League match between Galatasaray and Juventus. (Note: This was widely believed to be snow or hail, although it was neither.)

=== Sunshine and cloudiness ===
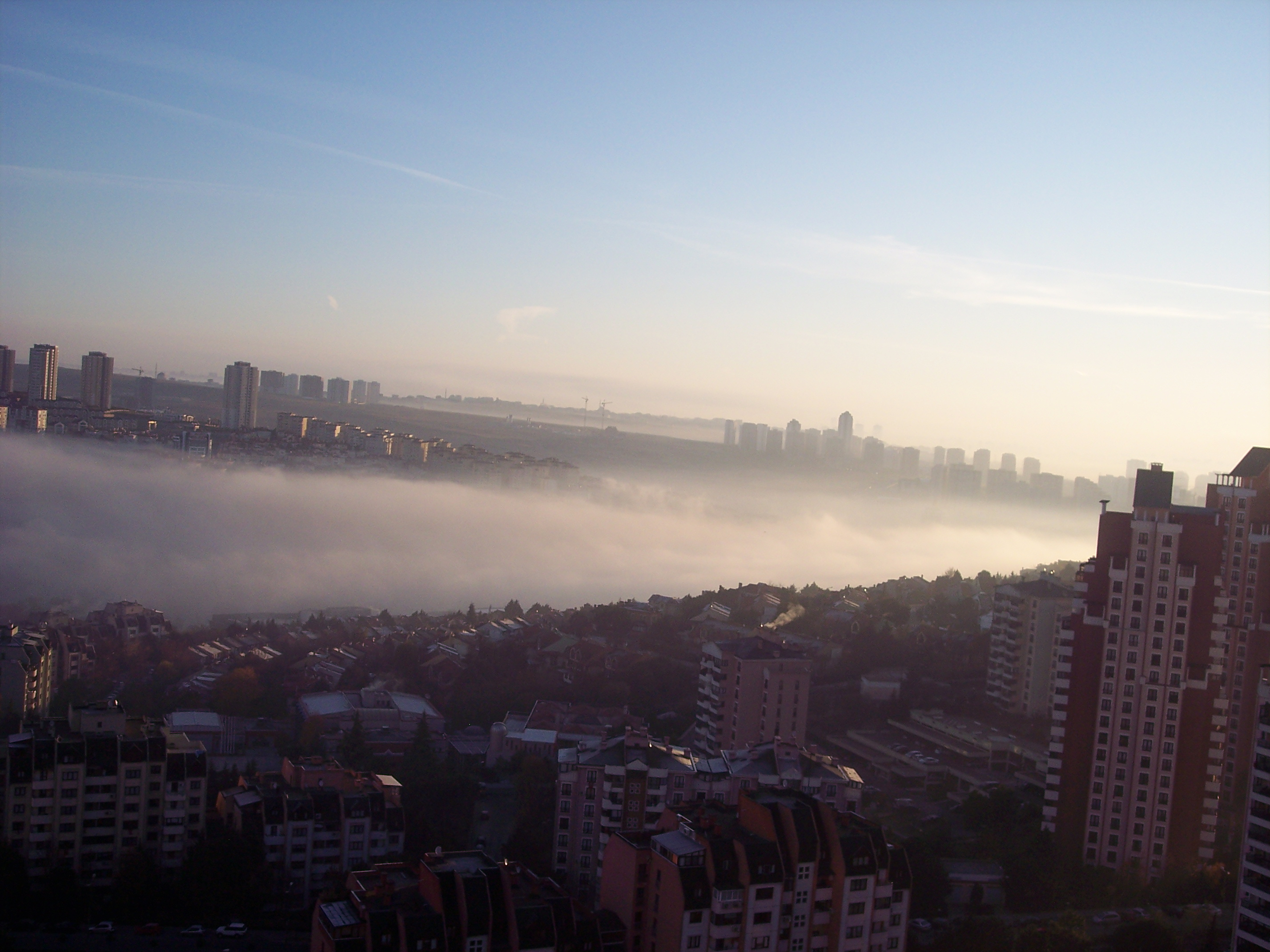
Morning fog on the outskirts of the city. Fog often avoids urban areas and high hills in Istanbul.

Istanbul's sunshine is profoundly seasonal, with cloudy winters and mostly sunny summers. Yearly, it averages around 2000 hours of sunshine, cloudier than the rest of the Mediterranean and generally similar to southern oceanic and sub-Mediterranean locales, like the Pacific Northwest in the US or areas around the Bay of Biscay in France.

In winter, the city is known for its persistently cloudy weather, with many regions getting less than 20 percent of their potential sunlight, and winter months of certain years getting less than 30 hours – equivalent to less than one tenth of possible sunshine. This brings Istanbul's sunshine hours to levels closer to Western Europe, while its generally sunny summers create a seasonal sunshine pattern perhaps most closely mirrored by Cascadia, specifically Seattle.

Fog is known to be a major component limiting sunshine in Istanbul. Fog formation in Istanbul is meteorologically classified into various mechanisms: advection, radiation, precipitation, cloud-base lowering, and evaporation. They exhibit significant spatial variation driven by the city's diverse local climatic features. Long-term observations across Istanbul's three major airports reveal that fog occurrences take place seasonality, especially November and February. Data before 1980 count annual foggy and misty days at above 200, and in some summer months, records show more than 25 days of fog and mist.

However, fog has been steadily declining since the 1970s. Data from the 1980s show around 100 days of fog and mist, and this has declined to about 60 in the last 10 years. This is likely due to the city's urban heat island, which has been raising overnight temperatures since the city's initial rapid expansion in the 1950s and 60s. While forested regions outside the city (especially in nearby Kocaeli Province) have lagged behind in the decrease of fog – the station in Gölcük had consistently been seeing over 200 days of fog until 1993, and now also averages around 60 – the decrease of fog poses a significant threat to the flora of the region, which feed on morning humidity in the relatively dry summer months.

=== Severe weather ===
Istanbul's climate is generally not conducive to severe weather, due to its maritime heating and cooling. However, instances of severe weather do occur in Istanbul with some regularity, mostly in the form of heavy snow, (Note: Extensively covered in the Precipitation section.) severe thunderstorms and heatwaves.

==== Thunderstorms ====
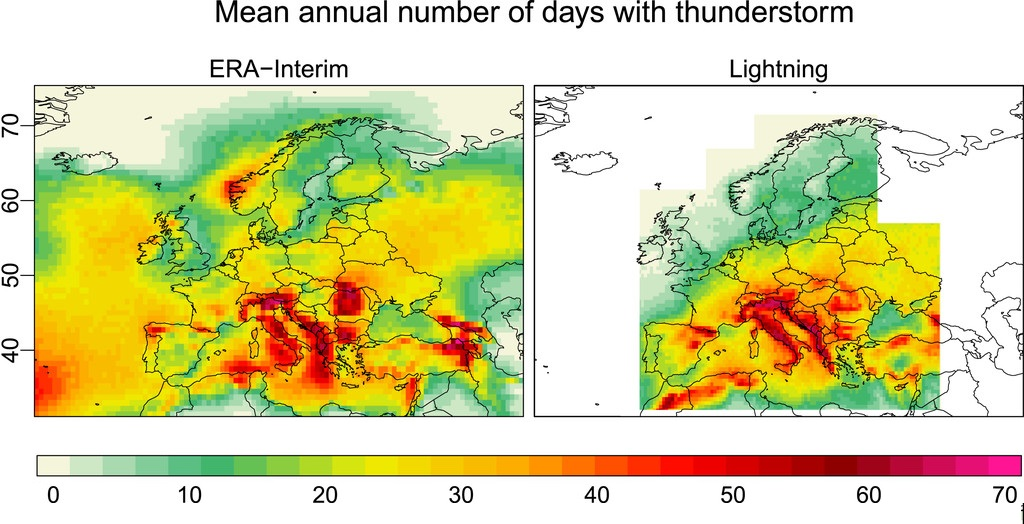
Istanbul experiences around 10-15 days of thunderstorms per year, relatively low for non-Atlantic Europe.

Istanbul experiences around 10–15 days of thunderstorms, with a primary peak in June, and another one in September. Unlike many central European cities, July and August are too dry to support a high amount of thunderstorms, and yet unlike many cities in the Mediterranean basin, winters are too cold and cloudy to support thunderstorms, causing two warm-season stormy periods with a summerly nadir in between.

Despite the relatively uncommon nature of thunderstorms in the city, a notable anomaly is the amount of strong to severe (Note: The definition used for 'severe thunderstorm' in this study is less strict than the US definition, generally including all thunderstorms that can cause damage; strong to severe is likely the correct US equivalent.) thunderstorms that occur yearly; about half of the thunderstorms that occur in the city (about 6–7) can be qualified as such. These thunderstorms peak around early-fall, likely due to warmer waters, while their anomalously high number is likely due to high wind shear and other conditions conducive to severe storm development.

Very damaging storms have happened on a somewhat consistent basis, a significant one in recent memory is the July 2017 storm, where 9 cm (3.5 in) hail causing damage to buildings, straight line winds of 100 kilometres per hour (62 mph) and widespread flooding was recorded. Tornadoes, even weak ones, are very uncommon, nevertheless not impossible, with recent storms in 2020 and 2021 dropping weak, non-damaging tornadoes.

==== Heat waves ====
Due to its maritime position, Istanbul is not susceptible to heat waves by southern European standards. Not only do cities with cooler summers (Note: Paris is likely the most well-known example.) often have higher summer temperature records than Istanbul, Istanbul escapes heat-waves even when they happen over northwestern Turkey. Most recently in September 2022, when southern Marmara was experiencing daily highs of about 37–38 °C (99–100 °F), Istanbul's high temperature was 29 °C (84 °F), with a strong northeasterly wind.

However, studies have shown that heatwaves, when they do happen, can and do cause excess death in the largely unprepared population. Four heat waves in the years 2013 to 2017, two of which happened in the year 2017, where every summer month anomalously experienced at least one day above 36 °C (97 °F), show that excess deaths do increase substantially during heatwaves.

=== Sea temperatures ===
Unsurprisingly, Istanbul's sea temperatures are warmer than its climate, in accordance with its place in the general Mediterranean region; this generally means that places farther away from the sea experience colder weather, especially in winter. Its 'cool but not cold' winter sea temperatures also have a major effect on the city's precipitation, especially on sea-effect snow.

Climate data for Istanbul
Month	Jan	Feb	Mar	Apr	May	Jun	Jul	Aug	Sep	Oct	Nov	Dec	Year
Average sea temperature °C (°F)	8.4 (47.1)	7.7 (45.9)	8.3 (46.9)	10.2 (50.4)	15.5 (59.9)	21.3 (70.3)	24.6 (76.3)	24.9 (76.8)	22.8 (73.0)	18.4 (65.1)	13.8 (56.8)	10.5 (50.9)	15.5 (60.0)
Source: Weather Atlas

== Classification ==
Istanbul: Climate according to major climate systems
Climatic scheme	Initials	Description
Köppen system	Csa/Csb	Mediterranean climate
Trewartha system	Cs/Cf/Do	Mediterranean climate, Humid subtropical climate, Oceanic climate
Alisov system	PmSm	Mediterranean climate, Oceanic climate (Note: Depending on the version used, Istanbul's dominant airmasses are Moist Polar air in winter, and Moist or Dry Subtropical air in summer. The most recent evaluations give credence to Moist Subtropical, resulting in the climate designation PmSm, equivalent to an Oceanic climate.)
Strahler system	8	Oceanic climate
Thornthwaite system	B1 B'2	Humid, mild mesothermal climate (Note: More info below.)
Neef system	—N/a	Mediterranean climate, Temperate transitional climate

The transitional nature of Istanbul's climate causes divergence in classification and nomenclature. According to Köppen and Trewartha, Istanbul has a borderline Mediterranean climate, humid subtropical climate and oceanic climate. Thornthwaite classifies most of the city as B1 B'2 s b'4, (Note: A humid, mild mesothermal climate with moderate summer drought and very low continentality.) while the semi-official Atalay system classifies it as a Mediterranean-oceanic transitional climate. Other nomenclature used to classify the city include 'Temperate transitional climate' and 'sub-continental-sub-Mediterranean transition climate'.

In stark contrast to the divergence in classification in generalist classifications, precipitation-based classifications generally concur that Istanbul is moist subhumid in the south and humid in the north. Only the Aydeniz aridity classification diverges from this, calling the city 'humid to perhumid', largely due to high relative humidity and fog.

== Areas and microclimates ==
Because of its hilly topography and maritime influences, Istanbul exhibits a multitude of distinct microclimates. Average temperatures range from 12 °C (54 °F) to 15 °C (59 °F) depending on location, rainfall varies widely from around 600 millimeters (24 in) on the southern fringe at Florya to 1,200 millimeters (47 in) on the northern fringe at Bahçeköy, and sunshine ranges from 2300 hours to 1800 hours (comparable to Portland, Oregon and Bournemouth respectively) depending on location.

Furthermore, while the city itself lies in USDA hardiness zones 9a to 9b, its inland suburbs lie in zone 8b with isolated pockets of zone 8a, restricting the cultivation of subtropical plants to the coasts.

=== Marmara coast ===
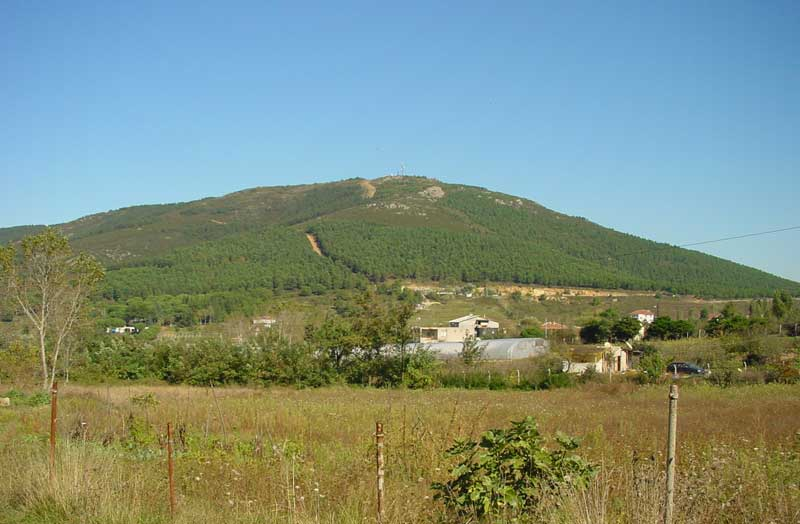
Vegetation on the Marmara coast is low-growing due to summer drought.

The warmest and driest region of Istanbul, the Marmara coast is considered to have a Mediterranean climate by both Köppen and Trewartha. Bohn, however, considers the area sub-Mediterranean as with the rest of Istanbul, and comments that the region is "protected from cold winds due to their location on southern slopes at the sea, [has] very high water deficiency in summer." Thornthwaite also considers the region "s2", "with considerable summer drought".

Its summers are some of the hottest in the province, with summerly means reaching 25 °C (77 °F) in July and August in some areas, although Bohn argues that if the region had not been thoroughly urbanized, this value would have been 20 °C (68 °F) to 23 °C (73 °F).

Winter temperatures are also higher, with daily means of about 6 °C (43 °F) in January and February over the lowlands, while some hills experience average temperatures around 4 °C (39 °F). The area largely lies in USDA hardiness zones 9a and 9b, with temperatures rarely falling below −5 °C (23 °F).

Rainfall is generally around 600 millimetres (24 in) to 800 millimetres (31 in) throughout the region, although rainy days increase from west to east, with Pendik getting around 12 more days of precipitation than Florya. The area is also relatively snow-poor, with less than 10 days of snow in all parts of the region, around half of which accumulates and stays on the ground for more than a day.

Sunshine ranges from 2000 to 2300 hours, with a notable west–east gradient, the eastern side being more cloudy.

Climate data for Florya, Bakırköy, Istanbul (normals 1991–2020, extremes 1937–present, sunshine 1981-2010)
Month	Jan	Feb	Mar	Apr	May	Jun	Jul	Aug	Sep	Oct	Nov	Dec	Year
Record high °C (°F)	20.5 (68.9)	21.0 (69.8)	26.0 (78.8)	30.5 (86.9)	33.5 (92.3)	36.2 (97.2)	37.4 (99.3)	38.6 (101.5)	39.5 (103.1)	32.3 (90.1)	26.4 (79.5)	23.1 (73.6)	39.5 (103.1)
Mean daily maximum °C (°F)	9.2 (48.6)	9.8 (49.6)	12.4 (54.3)	17.1 (62.8)	22.2 (72.0)	26.8 (80.2)	29.5 (85.1)	29.7 (85.5)	25.8 (78.4)	20.8 (69.4)	15.8 (60.4)	11.1 (52.0)	19.2 (66.5)
Daily mean °C (°F)	6.2 (43.2)	6.3 (43.3)	8.3 (46.9)	12.2 (54.0)	17.2 (63.0)	22.0 (71.6)	24.7 (76.5)	25.0 (77.0)	21.1 (70.0)	16.7 (62.1)	12.1 (53.8)	8.1 (46.6)	15.0 (59.0)
Mean daily minimum °C (°F)	3.7 (38.7)	3.6 (38.5)	5.3 (41.5)	8.6 (47.5)	13.4 (56.1)	17.8 (64.0)	20.5 (68.9)	21.1 (70.0)	17.4 (63.3)	13.6 (56.5)	9.3 (48.7)	5.7 (42.3)	11.7 (53.0)
Record low °C (°F)	−12.6 (9.3)	−10.0 (14.0)	−9.6 (14.7)	−1.4 (29.5)	1.4 (34.5)	8.4 (47.1)	11.0 (51.8)	11.4 (52.5)	6.7 (44.1)	1.8 (35.2)	−4.6 (23.7)	−11.5 (11.3)	−12.6 (9.3)
Average precipitation mm (inches)	72.0 (2.83)	78.8 (3.10)	61.0 (2.40)	51.5 (2.03)	30.2 (1.19)	31.5 (1.24)	19.8 (0.78)	26.1 (1.03)	44.7 (1.76)	80.4 (3.17)	69.3 (2.73)	87.3 (3.44)	648.0 (25.51)
Average extreme snow depth cm (inches)	7.0 (2.8)	7.5 (3.0)	1.1 (0.4)	0 (0)	0 (0)	0 (0)	0 (0)	0 (0)	0 (0)	0 (0)	trace	1.2 (0.5)	12.4 (4.9)
Average precipitation days (≥ 0.1 mm)	18.3	16.8	15.5	10.6	9.0	6.3	3.3	3.2	7.3	11.8	13.5	17.2	132.8
Average snowy days (≥ 0.1 cm)	2.7	3.5	0.6	0.0	0.0	0.0	0.0	0.0	0.0	0.0	0.2	1.0	8.0
Average relative humidity (%)	79.1	78.4	75.7	73.1	73.1	70.3	68.2	69.7	71.8	77.2	78.3	78.9	74.5
Mean monthly sunshine hours	89.3	103.4	154.8	198.2	279.0	286.2	310.7	284.2	201.7	152.1	112.0	83.3	2,254.9
Mean daily sunshine hours	2.8	3.6	4.9	6.6	9.0	9.5	10.0	9.1	6.7	4.9	3.7	2.6	6.1
Percentage possible sunshine	28	32	40	50	64	63	66	65	55	44	37	28	48

Climate data for Kurtköy, Pendik, Istanbul (more data in the district article)
Month	Jan	Feb	Mar	Apr	May	Jun	Jul	Aug	Sep	Oct	Nov	Dec	Year
Mean daily maximum °C (°F)	9.3 (48.7)	10.0 (50.0)	11.8 (53.2)	16.9 (62.4)	21.7 (71.1)	26.2 (79.2)	28.5 (83.3)	28.3 (82.9)	25.1 (77.2)	19.9 (67.8)	15.7 (60.3)	11.7 (53.1)	18.8 (65.8)
Daily mean °C (°F)	6.1 (43.0)	6.7 (44.1)	8.0 (46.4)	12.4 (54.3)	16.8 (62.2)	21.0 (69.8)	23.3 (73.9)	23.3 (73.9)	20.3 (68.5)	15.9 (60.6)	12.1 (53.8)	8.5 (47.3)	14.5 (58.2)
Mean daily minimum °C (°F)	2.8 (37.0)	3.3 (37.9)	4.1 (39.4)	7.8 (46.0)	11.8 (53.2)	15.8 (60.4)	18.1 (64.6)	18.3 (64.9)	15.4 (59.7)	11.8 (53.2)	8.4 (47.1)	5.3 (41.5)	10.2 (50.4)
Average precipitation mm (inches)	97.5 (3.84)	79.8 (3.14)	64.0 (2.52)	55.9 (2.20)	52.0 (2.05)	46.4 (1.83)	24.0 (0.94)	43.4 (1.71)	58.3 (2.30)	59.9 (2.36)	62.6 (2.46)	88.6 (3.49)	732.4 (28.84)
Average precipitation days (≥ 0.1 mm)	18	16	14	12	11	9	4	7	10	12	14	17	144
Average snowy days (≥ 0.1 cm)	2	3	1	0	0	0	0	0	0	0	0	1	7
Mean monthly sunshine hours	63.6	80.8	123.1	170.0	226.3	266.6	279.8	265.8	199.5	158.5	104.6	72.0	2,010.6
Mean daily sunshine hours	2.1	2.8	3.9	5.6	7.3	8.8	9.0	8.6	6.7	5.1	3.4	2.3	5.5
Percentage possible sunshine	21	25	32	43	52	58	60	61	55	46	34	26	43

=== Inland from the Bosporus ===
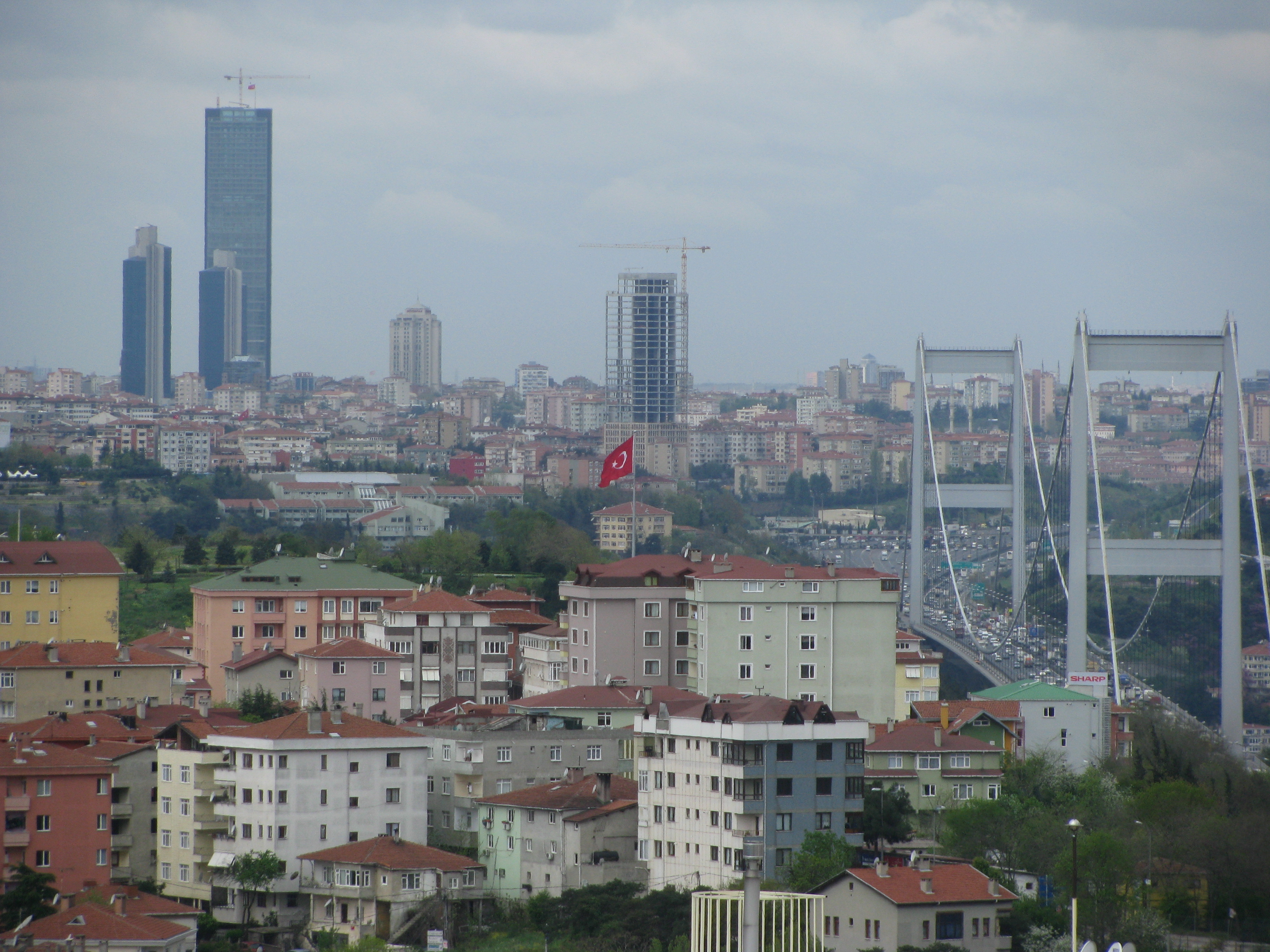
The Bosporus provides an important channel for winds, creating heavy gusts along its shores.

The climate near the Bosporus is cooler, wetter and cloudier, and represents a good average of the region of Istanbul. It is classified as humid subtropical by both Köppen and Trewartha, although non-urbanized and hilly regions are mostly oceanic, as most of the region likely was before urbanization. Bohn further comments on this region by stating that, starting here, the precipitation regime is profoundly impacted by the Black Sea.

The coldest month generally averages around 5–6 °C (41–43 °F), with a USDA hardiness zone of 8b and 9a, while the warmest month seems to have experienced significant warming from 20–22 °C (68–72 °F) to 23–24 °C (73–75 °F). Despite this, summer days are still relatively acceptable at around 27–28 °C (81–82 °F), with most of the warming happening during nighttime.

Precipitation generally averages around 800 millimetres (31 in) to 1,000 millimetres (39 in), with the Anatolian side getting more precipitation. The lack of a real summer drought, with at least 30 mm (1.2 in) of precipitation every month, further distinguishes this region from the south. Snowfall is generally plentiful, due to the relatively continental nature of the region.

Sunshine is a bit lower than the southern coast, usually around 2000–2200 hours, yet still higher than the northern coasts.

Climate data for Kireçburnu, Sarıyer, Istanbul (normals 1991–2020, precipitation days and sunshine 1981-2010, snowy days 1996-2011)
Month	Jan	Feb	Mar	Apr	May	Jun	Jul	Aug	Sep	Oct	Nov	Dec	Year
Record high °C (°F)	22.4 (72.3)	24.6 (76.3)	29.3 (84.7)	33.6 (92.5)	36.4 (97.5)	40.2 (104.4)	41.5 (106.7)	40.5 (104.9)	39.6 (103.3)	34.2 (93.6)	27.8 (82.0)	25.5 (77.9)	41.5 (106.7)
Mean daily maximum °C (°F)	8.8 (47.8)	9.4 (48.9)	12.0 (53.6)	16.1 (61.0)	21.0 (69.8)	25.7 (78.3)	28.0 (82.4)	28.2 (82.8)	24.6 (76.3)	19.9 (67.8)	15.0 (59.0)	10.7 (51.3)	18.3 (64.9)
Daily mean °C (°F)	5.9 (42.6)	6.1 (43.0)	8.0 (46.4)	11.5 (52.7)	16.3 (61.3)	21.1 (70.0)	23.7 (74.7)	24.2 (75.6)	20.5 (68.9)	16.2 (61.2)	11.7 (53.1)	7.9 (46.2)	14.4 (58.0)
Mean daily minimum °C (°F)	3.6 (38.5)	3.5 (38.3)	4.9 (40.8)	8.1 (46.6)	12.8 (55.0)	17.4 (63.3)	20.3 (68.5)	21.2 (70.2)	17.4 (63.3)	13.6 (56.5)	9.2 (48.6)	5.5 (41.9)	11.5 (52.6)
Record low °C (°F)	−13.9 (7.0)	−16.1 (3.0)	−11.1 (12.0)	−2.0 (28.4)	1.4 (34.5)	7.1 (44.8)	10.5 (50.9)	10.2 (50.4)	6.0 (42.8)	0.6 (33.1)	−7.2 (19.0)	−11.5 (11.3)	−16.1 (3.0)
Average precipitation mm (inches)	96.1 (3.78)	87.7 (3.45)	69.8 (2.75)	45.1 (1.78)	37.1 (1.46)	44.7 (1.76)	36.3 (1.43)	43.5 (1.71)	81.3 (3.20)	98.3 (3.87)	100.5 (3.96)	124.8 (4.91)	865.2 (34.06)
Average precipitation days (≥ 0.1 mm)	16.9	15.2	13.2	10.0	7.4	7.0	4.7	5.1	8.1	12.3	13.9	17.5	131.3
Average snowy days (≥ 0.1 cm)	4.5	4.7	2.9	0.1	0.0	0.0	0.0	0.0	0.0	0.0	0.3	2.7	15.2
Average relative humidity (%)	79.8	78.6	75.8	75.1	76.5	75.7	75.3	75.9	75.0	78.4	78.9	78.4	76.9
Mean monthly sunshine hours	68.2	89.6	142.6	180.0	248.0	297.6	319.3	288.3	234.0	158.1	93.0	62.0	2,180.7
Mean daily sunshine hours	2.2	3.2	4.6	6.0	8.0	9.6	10.3	9.3	7.8	5.1	3.1	2.0	5.9
Percentage possible sunshine	22	29	38	46	57	64	69	66	65	46	31	22	46

Climate data for Kandilli, Üsküdar, Istanbul
Month	Jan	Feb	Mar	Apr	May	Jun	Jul	Aug	Sep	Oct	Nov	Dec	Year
Mean daily maximum °C (°F)	7.9 (46.2)	8.0 (46.4)	10.4 (50.7)	15.5 (59.9)	20.2 (68.4)	24.9 (76.8)	27.1 (80.8)	27.0 (80.6)	23.8 (74.8)	19.0 (66.2)	14.6 (58.3)	10.5 (50.9)	17.4 (63.3)
Daily mean °C (°F)	5.2 (41.4)	5.1 (41.2)	7.0 (44.6)	11.3 (52.3)	15.8 (60.4)	20.2 (68.4)	22.7 (72.9)	22.8 (73.0)	19.6 (67.3)	15.4 (59.7)	11.3 (52.3)	7.8 (46.0)	13.7 (56.6)
Mean daily minimum °C (°F)	2.4 (36.3)	2.2 (36.0)	3.5 (38.3)	7.1 (44.8)	11.3 (52.3)	15.4 (59.7)	18.2 (64.8)	18.5 (65.3)	15.3 (59.5)	11.7 (53.1)	8.0 (46.4)	5.0 (41.0)	9.9 (49.8)
Average precipitation mm (inches)	103 (4.1)	83 (3.3)	69 (2.7)	45 (1.8)	37 (1.5)	36 (1.4)	32 (1.3)	39 (1.5)	69 (2.7)	96 (3.8)	101 (4.0)	128 (5.0)	838 (33.1)

=== Northern hills and valleys ===
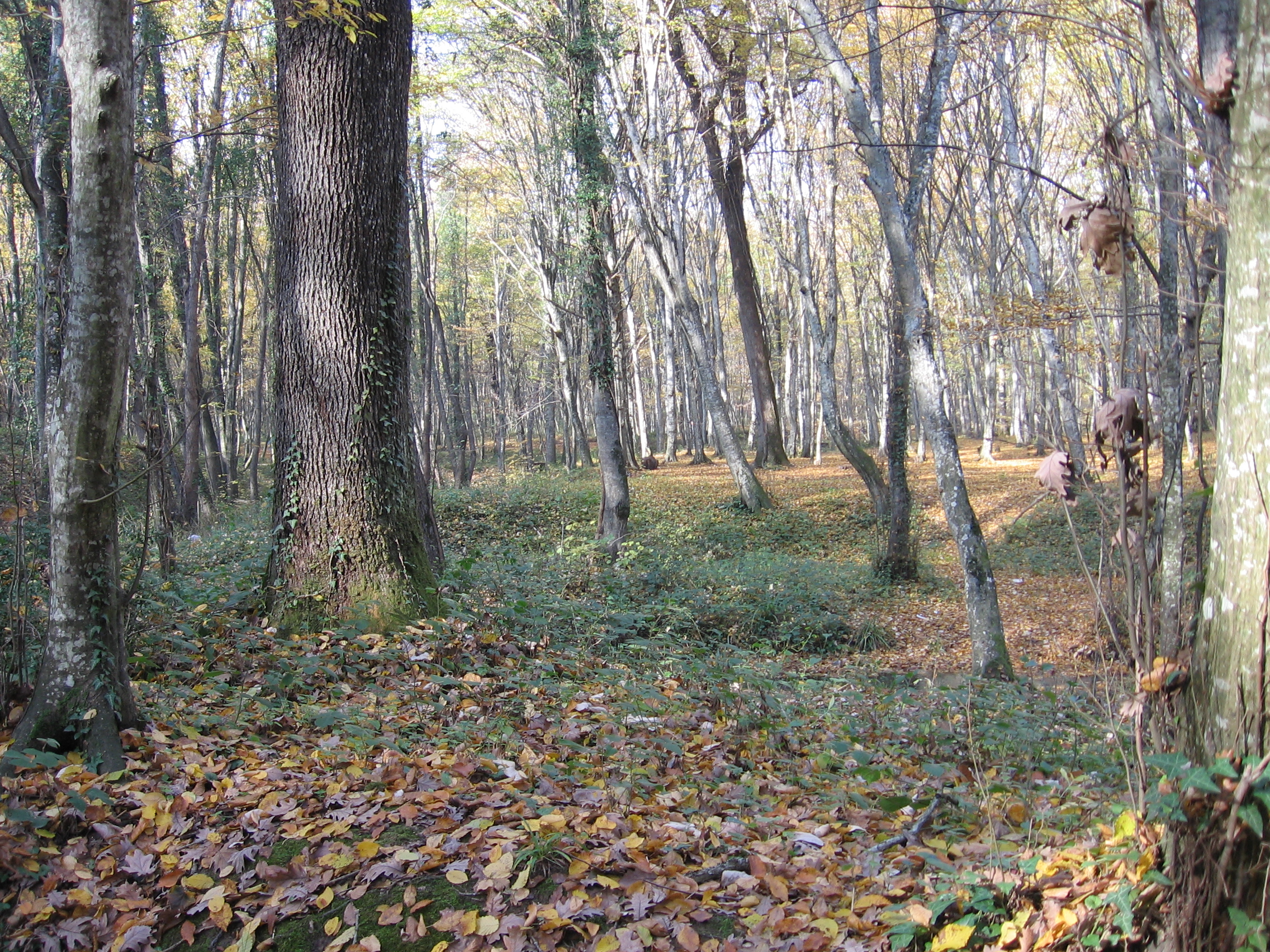
Belgrad Forest in Bahçeköy, consisting of mixed oak and beech, is the wettest place in Istanbul.

The northern third of Istanbul is the wettest part of the city. It is considered borderline humid subtropical (Cfa/Cf) and oceanic (Cfb/Do), though the oceanic zone is rapidly shrinking, and the driest parts of the region in and around Kilyos can be considered on the wet fringes of a Mediterranean (Csa/Cs) climate. Bohn characterizes the climate as "moist-temperate (...) by mostly north and northeastern winds by the Black Sea; [with] frequent formation of thew [sic] and mists in summer."

Summer averages are generally around 21–23 °C (70–73 °F), with locales closer to the coast experiencing very narrow diurnal temperature ranges. Winter averages depend on proximity to the coast; inland parts of the region have averages around 4 °C (39 °F) while coastal regions see winter temperatures close to the rest of the city. Accordingly, USDA hardiness zones are equally variable, from 9a around the coast to 8a in some inland valleys.

Precipitation is variable, with averages ranging from 800 millimetres (31 in) to 1,200 millimetres (47 in), depending on location. Rainy days, more plentiful than the rest of the city, show the usual east–west gradient; with Şile getting up to 15 days more precipitation than Bahçeköy. Also notable is the sheer frequency of precipitation in some areas, as Şile averages above 20 days of precipitation in December.

Snowfall is plentiful due to proximity to the Black Sea coast, although along the coast the snowy season is shorter, with only around 1 day of snow in March.

Sunshine data in this region is relatively scarce, but the station in Kilyos averages around 1800 hours of sunshine, making it the cloudiest recorded area of Istanbul.

Climate data for Bahçeköy, Sarıyer, Istanbul (normals 1981–2010, snowy days 1990-1999)
Month	Jan	Feb	Mar	Apr	May	Jun	Jul	Aug	Sep	Oct	Nov	Dec	Year
Mean daily maximum °C (°F)	7.6 (45.7)	8.3 (46.9)	10.2 (50.4)	16.4 (61.5)	20.6 (69.1)	25.0 (77.0)	26.4 (79.5)	26.6 (79.9)	23.7 (74.7)	19.0 (66.2)	14.2 (57.6)	9.8 (49.6)	17.3 (63.2)
Daily mean °C (°F)	4.6 (40.3)	4.0 (39.2)	5.9 (42.6)	10.3 (50.5)	15.4 (59.7)	19.8 (67.6)	21.5 (70.7)	21.6 (70.9)	18.1 (64.6)	14.1 (57.4)	9.5 (49.1)	6.3 (43.3)	12.6 (54.7)
Mean daily minimum °C (°F)	1.3 (34.3)	1.1 (34.0)	2.5 (36.5)	6.4 (43.5)	10.6 (51.1)	14.7 (58.5)	17.0 (62.6)	17.9 (64.2)	13.9 (57.0)	10.7 (51.3)	6.8 (44.2)	3.4 (38.1)	8.9 (47.9)
Average precipitation mm (inches)	163.7 (6.44)	112.5 (4.43)	101.3 (3.99)	68.3 (2.69)	55.8 (2.20)	47.4 (1.87)	45.3 (1.78)	71.9 (2.83)	79.6 (3.13)	119.0 (4.69)	164.3 (6.47)	188.3 (7.41)	1,217.4 (47.93)
Average precipitation days (≥ 0.1 mm)	15.8	14.2	12.9	10.1	8.3	6.9	5.8	5.9	7.4	12.6	15.4	19.8	135.1
Average snowy days (≥ 0.1 cm)	4.6	5.2	1.7	0.4	0.0	0.0	0.0	0.0	0.0	0.0	0.3	4.0	16.2

Climate data for Şile, Istanbul
Month	Jan	Feb	Mar	Apr	May	Jun	Jul	Aug	Sep	Oct	Nov	Dec	Year
Mean daily maximum °C (°F)	9.2 (48.6)	9.8 (49.6)	12.1 (53.8)	15.9 (60.6)	20.6 (69.1)	25.3 (77.5)	27.7 (81.9)	27.9 (82.2)	24.6 (76.3)	19.9 (67.8)	15.3 (59.5)	11.0 (51.8)	18.3 (64.9)
Daily mean °C (°F)	5.8 (42.4)	6.0 (42.8)	7.9 (46.2)	11.3 (52.3)	16.0 (60.8)	20.7 (69.3)	23.3 (73.9)	23.8 (74.8)	20.1 (68.2)	15.9 (60.6)	11.4 (52.5)	7.6 (45.7)	14.2 (57.5)
Mean daily minimum °C (°F)	2.9 (37.2)	2.9 (37.2)	4.4 (39.9)	7.5 (45.5)	12.0 (53.6)	16.1 (61.0)	18.9 (66.0)	19.8 (67.6)	16.1 (61.0)	12.5 (54.5)	8.1 (46.6)	4.7 (40.5)	10.5 (50.9)
Average precipitation mm (inches)	87.5 (3.44)	73.7 (2.90)	70.3 (2.77)	45.5 (1.79)	32.3 (1.27)	39.7 (1.56)	37.6 (1.48)	62.5 (2.46)	79.3 (3.12)	110.2 (4.34)	85.3 (3.36)	117.0 (4.61)	840.9 (33.1)
Average precipitation days (≥ 0.1 mm)	18.8	15.3	13.7	12.4	11.6	9.2	5.0	6.7	7.9	12.5	16.8	20.2	150.1
Average snowy days (≥ 0.1 cm)	4.3	4.4	0.5	0.0	0.0	0.0	0.0	0.0	0.0	0.0	0.1	2.6	11.9
Average relative humidity (%)	81.0	80.2	78.0	78.4	81.2	80.9	80.9	80.6	79.1	81.7	80.9	80.8	80.3

== See also ==
- Climate of Turkey
- Climate change in Turkey
- SantralIstanbul
