= Elpida =

Elpida (Greek: Ελπίδα) is a Greek word which means "hope." Elpida may refer to:

== People ==
- Elpida Karamandi (1920–1942), Macedonian partisan fighter
- Elpida (singer) (born 1949), Greek singer
- Elpida Romantzi (born 1981), archer from Greece
- Elpida Tsouri (born 1961), Member of Parliament in Greece for the Panhellenic Socialist Movement (PASOK)
- Elpida Hadjidaki (born 1948), Greek marine archaeologist
- Elpis (wife of Boethius) (died c. 504), Latin poet and hymnographer; also called Elpida

== Other ==
- Elpida Memory, former Japanese DRAM manufacturer and foundry now owned by and trading under Micron Technology name
- Elpida, brand name for the HIV medication elsulfavirine
- "Olou tou kosmou i elpida", Greek entry in Eurovision Song Contest 1992
- Storm Elpida, the eastern Mediterranean winter storm that affected Greece, Turkey and other nearby countries in January 2022
- Hope for Democracy (Ελπίδα για την Δημοκρατία), Greek political party founded in 2026 by Maria Karystianou.
