= Stephanie Fleischmann =

American librettist and playwright

- Education: Wesleyan University (BA); Brooklyn College (MFA)
- Occupations: Librettist, playwright, lyricist
- Writing career
- Notable works: The Long Walk; In a Grove; Another City; The Pigeon Keeper
- Notable awards: Campbell Opera Librettist Prize (2022); Guggenheim Fellowship (2026)
- Website: www.stephaniefleischmann.com

Stephanie Fleischmann is an American librettist, playwright and lyricist. Her work includes the operas The Long Walk, In a Grove, Another City and The Pigeon Keeper, created in collaboration with composers including Jeremy Howard Beck, Christopher Cerrone and David Hanlon. She received OPERA America's Campbell Opera Librettist Prize in 2022 and a Guggenheim Fellowship in drama and performance art in 2026.

== Early life and education ==
Fleischmann spent part of her early childhood in London before growing up in Los Angeles. Her father was arts administrator Ernest Fleischmann, who served for many years as executive director of the Los Angeles Philharmonic. She has said that her exposure to orchestral music and theatre while growing up influenced the musical structure and lyrical qualities of her writing.

She received a bachelor's degree from Wesleyan University and a Master of Fine Arts in playwriting from Brooklyn College, where she studied with playwright Mac Wellman.

== Career ==
Fleischmann initially worked principally as a playwright before increasingly writing libretti and other texts for musical performance. Her plays and music-theatre works have been developed or presented by theatre organizations in the United States and Europe. Her play What the Moon Saw, or "I Only Appear to Be Dead", inspired by the fairy tales of Hans Christian Andersen, places several Andersen stories in a world shaped by the September 11 attacks. It received a Los Angeles production in 2011.

She was a resident playwright at New Dramatists, a core writer at the Playwrights' Center and a resident artist in the Composer Librettist Development Program of the American Lyric Theater. She has taught playwriting at Bard College, Sewanee and Skidmore College.

Fleischmann has described the libretto as a dramatic structure that provides space for music rather than functioning as a conventional standalone play. Her libretti frequently use fragmented narratives, multiple perspectives and documentary material.

== Operatic works ==
=== The Long Walk ===
Fleischmann wrote the libretto for The Long Walk, with music by Jeremy Howard Beck. Based on Iraq War veteran Brian Castner's memoir of the same name, the opera follows an explosive-ordnance-disposal officer experiencing post-traumatic stress after returning to his family. It received its world premiere at Opera Saratoga in 2015 and was subsequently produced by companies including Utah Opera and Pittsburgh Opera.

=== In a Grove ===
Fleischmann collaborated with composer Christopher Cerrone on In a Grove, an adaptation of Ryūnosuke Akutagawa's short story of the same name. The creators moved the story from Japan to the mountains of Oregon in 1921, following a forest fire, while retaining its structure of contradictory testimony concerning a man's death.

The opera was co-commissioned by Pittsburgh Opera and Los Angeles Opera and premiered in Pittsburgh in February 2022. A review in Classical Voice North America praised the integration of Fleischmann's adapted narrative with Cerrone's music and the production's visual design.

=== Another City ===
Another City, another collaboration with Beck, premiered through Houston Grand Opera in March 2023. The chamber opera depicts a day in the lives of unhoused Houston residents and people working in homelessness services. Fleischmann and Beck developed the work over several years, drawing on approximately 60 hours of interviews with unhoused people and research conducted on the streets of Houston.

The Texas Observer wrote that the work transformed the language and experiences of its interview subjects into opera while maintaining the credibility of their accounts. The Texas Classical Review noted that Fleischmann used conversational language instead of traditional poetic operatic diction.

=== The Pigeon Keeper ===
Fleischmann wrote the libretto for David Hanlon's The Pigeon Keeper, a chamber opera about a girl and her father who encounter a displaced boy at sea. Set on a fictional Mediterranean island, the work addresses migration, belonging, grief and the treatment of outsiders.

The opera was developed through the Santa Fe Opera's Opera for All Voices initiative and co-commissioned by Opera Parallèle and Opera Omaha. Its world premiere was presented by Opera Parallèle in San Francisco in March 2025. Reviews praised the directness of Fleischmann's libretto and the work's treatment of refugees and social exclusion.

== Other collaborations ==
Fleischmann's other opera libretti include Poppaea, composed by Michael Hersch; The Property, composed by Wlad Marhulets; Arkhipov, composed by Peter Knell; After the Storm, composed by David Hanlon; and Dido Reimagined, composed by Melinda Wagner.

She also wrote the text for composer Anna Clyne's choral and orchestral work The Years, which was premiered by the Scottish Chamber Orchestra and its chorus in 2022. The Observer described Fleischmann as an American playwright and praised the work's treatment of time through interwoven choral and orchestral writing.

in 2023, Stephanie Fleischmann and Alex Weiser created the opera, Shprintze focused on the tragic story of one of Tevye's daughters.

== Awards and honours ==
Fleischmann received the Campbell Opera Librettist Prize from OPERA America in 2022. The award, established by librettist Mark Campbell, recognizes contributions to American opera and provides support for the recipient's artistic development.

In 2026, she was awarded a Guggenheim Fellowship in drama and performance art. She said that she planned to use the fellowship to develop two opera libretti, including a work inspired by the Odyssey and a comic work about elitism in opera.

Her earlier support has included a Howard Foundation Fellowship in playwriting, fellowships from the New York Foundation for the Arts and grants from the National Endowment for the Arts and the New York State Council on the Arts.

== Selected works ==
=== Operas ===
- The Property, music by Wlad Marhulets
- The Long Walk, music by Jeremy Howard Beck
- After the Storm, music by David Hanlon
- Poppaea, music by Michael Hersch
- In a Grove, music by Christopher Cerrone
- Arkhipov, music by Peter Knell
- Another City, music by Jeremy Howard Beck
- The Pigeon Keeper, music by David Hanlon

=== Plays and music theatre ===
- What the Moon Saw, or "I Only Appear to Be Dead"
- Red Fly/Blue Bottle
- The Secret Lives of Coats
- Sound House
- Tally Ho
