= Elpis =

Elpis may refer to:

- Elpis (mythology), Ancient Greek spirit of Hope
- Elpis (ship)
- Elpis (wife of Boethius) (died c. AD 504), a Roman poet and hymnographer
- Storm Elpis, Greek windstorm and blizzard in January 2022
- 59 Elpis, a main-belt asteroid
