= Ekezie =

- Gender: Male
- Language: Igbo

Origin
- Word/name: Nigeria
- Meaning: To apportion (something) fairly or To create (someone) perfectly.

Ekezie is a Nigerian surname. Notable people with the surname include:

- Charity Ekezie, Nigerian TikToker and journalist
- Obinna Ekezie (born 1975), Nigerian basketball player
  - Obinna Ekezie Jr. (born 2008), Nigerian basketball player, son of the above
