= Shprintze =

A character by Sholem Aleichem

Shprintze or Shprintse (Yiddish: שפּרינצע) is the fourth of Tevye's daughters, with a tragic fate, a character created by Sholem Aleichem.

== Etymology ==
The name "Shprintze" comes from Spanish Esperanza meaning "hope". The name Esperanza was brought to Central and Eastern Europe by Sephardic Jews, who spoke Judaeo-Spanish language, and was transformed to Shprintze by the Ashkenazi Jews.

== Shprintze's story ==
Sholem Aleichem's 1907 short story Shtrintze is a tragic story of love of Shprintze and Arontshik, a young man, a son of a wealthy widow. They were planning a marriage, but the arrangement was broken by the intervention of Aronchik's relatives, and devastated Shprintze drowns herself. In the Fiddler on the Roof, Shprintze has only a minimal presence, probably due to her tragic story.

In 2023, composer Alex Weiser made his own translation of the story, to use it in his (with Stephanie Fleischmann) opera, Tevye’s Daughters, with the focus on the tragic fate of Shprintse. The opera is a narrative coming from daughters themselves, rather than via the lens of Tevye's masculine view. The libretto is inspired by the words of little-known female Yiddish writers and by tkhines, women's Yiddish prayers. The opera is framed in the 1967 United States, where the emigrated and aged three of Tevyye's daughters, Tseytl, Khave, and Beylke, have flashbacks into the 1907 Ukraine.
