= Esperanza (given name) =

- Gender: Female

Origin
- Origin: Spanish
- Meaning: "hope", "expectation"

Other names
- Related names: Hope, Nadezhda, Nadia, Nadine

Esperanza is a Spanish feminine given name, meaning "hope" or "expectation".

== List of people with the given name Esperanza ==
- Esperanza Aguirre (born 1952), Aristocrat and president of the Spanish autonomous community of Madrid since 2003
- Esperanza Andrade (born 1949), Secretary of State of Texas
- Esperanza Baur (1920–1961), Mexican actress and second wife of John Wayne
- Esperanza Cabral, current Secretary of the Department of Social Welfare and Development in the Philippines
- Esperanza García (1975–2025), Spanish lawyer and politician
- Esperanza Guisán, Spanish philosopher
- Esperanza Malchi (died 1600), economic agent of the Valide Sultan Safiye
- Esperanza Martinez (1934–1998), Mexican painter
- Esperanza Osmeña (1896–1978), second wife of Philippine President Sergio Osmeña and is considered the fourth First Lady of the Philippines
- Esperanza Perez Padilla (born 1964), better known as Zsa Zsa Padilla, Filipina singer and actress
- Esperanza Roy (born 1935), Spanish actress
- Esperanza Sánchez Mastrapa (1902–after 1958), was the first Afro-Cuban woman elected to the Cuban congress
- Esperanza Spalding (born 1984), American multi-instrumentalist best known as a jazz bassist, singer and composer
- Esperanza Zambrano (1901-1992), Mexican poet
