= Charity Nebbe =

American journalist

- Born: January 10, 1975 (age 51)
- Presenting career
- Show: Talk of Iowa
- Network: Iowa Public Radio

Charity Nebbe (/ˈnɛbi/ NEB-ee; born January 10, 1975) is the host of Iowa Public Radio's weekday show, Talk of Iowa and of Iowa Public Television's show Iowa Ingredient.

== Career ==
A native of Iowa, she grew up near Cedar Falls, and attended Iowa State University, from which she received a B.A. in Political Science and Biology. While attending Iowa State, Nebbe began her career in public radio with a job at WOI Radio. In 1998, while at WOI, she co-created and co-hosted (with Daniel Pinkwater ) a weekly National Public Radio program for children, Chinwag Theater, which was carried nationally by over 50 stations for two seasons.

From 2000 to 2010, she worked as a presenter of Michigan Radio, where she was the local host of All Things Considered, before returning to work for Iowa Public Radio in 2010. Since then she has been the host of daily talk show, Talk of Iowa. She is also the host of a weekly cooking show, Iowa Ingredient, which has aired on Iowa Public Television since 2012. Nebbe is also the author of a children's book, Our Walk in the Woods (2008).

== Personal life ==
Nebbe currently lives outside Iowa City with her husband and two children.
