= Kireçburnu, Sarıyer =

Kireçburnu
- Neighbourhood
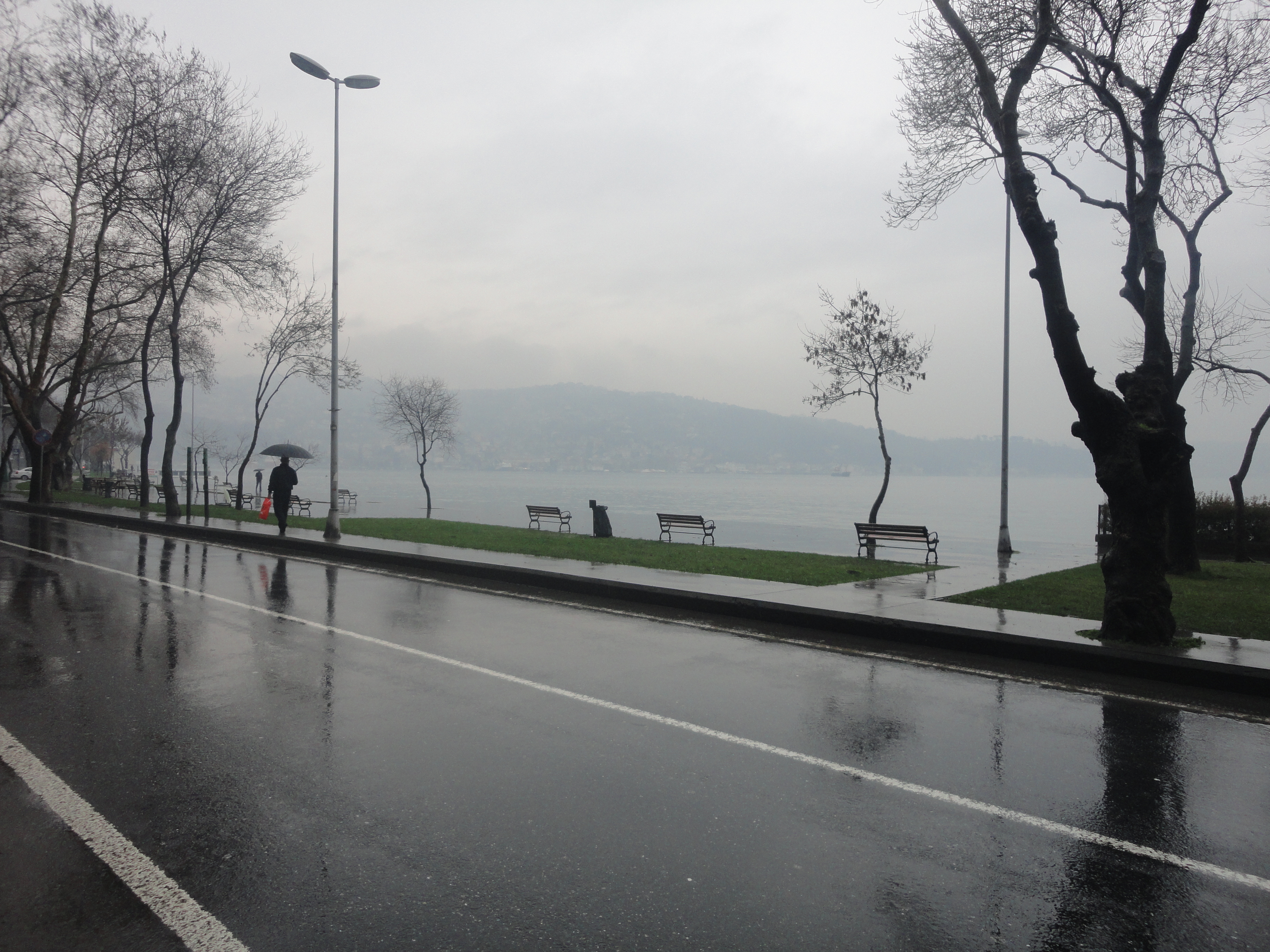
- A view from the Bosphorus shore at Kireçburnu.

- Location within Turkey Location within Istanbul
- Coordinates: 41°08′33″N 29°02′45″E
- Country: Turkey
- Province: Istanbul
- District: Sarıyer
- Population (2022): 6,888
- Time zone: UTC+3 (TRT)
- Postal code: 34457
- Area code: 0212

Kireçburnu is a neighbourhood in the municipality and district of Sarıyer, Istanbul Province, Turkey. Its population is 6,888 (2022). It is located on the northern shore of Bosphorus at European side. It is to the north of İstanbul centre with a distance over 15 kilometres (9.3 mi).

During the Byzantine Empire era Kireçburnu was a village named Kleidai tou Pontou. It means the Key of Pontus. The reason for this is that Kireçburnu is the first place where you see the Black Sea when you go north from Istanbul.

During the construction of Rumeli Castle by the Ottoman Sultan Mehmet II, the limekilns in the village were used as the construction material of the castle. Turkish for lime is kireç and for cape is burun; eventually the village was called Kireçburnu. As the urban fabric of İstanbul expanded Kireçburnu became a neighborhood of the city.

Kireçburnu is bordered by Tarabya in the south. The neighborhood is well known for its fish food restaurants.

== Sports ==
The local sports club Kireçburnu Spor is active in football only. Its women's team was promoted from the Second League to the Turkish Women's First Football League for the 2015–16 season.

== In popular culture ==
Kireçburnu was used as a filming location for the Turkish TV series Leyla ile Mecnun (2011–2013). Iconic scenes were shot in various spots within the neighborhood, including Mecnun's house, the nearby coastline, and Erdal Bakkal. These locations have since become points of interest for fans of the series.

== Transport ==
Kireçburnu is served by following city line buses:

- 25A – Rumeli Kavağı – Hacıosman Metro
- 25E – Sarıyer – Kabataş
- 25Y – Hacıosman Metro -Sarıyer – Yunus Emre – Uyum Sitesi*
- 40 – Rumelifeneri – Garipçe – Taksim
- 40B – Sarıyer – Beşiktaş
- 42T – Bahçeköy – Taksim
