= Alex Weiser =

American classical composer

- Born: New York City, New York, USA
- Genre: Contemporary classical
- Occupation: Composer
- Years active: 2019-present
- Website: Official website
- Education: Yale University; New York University

Alex Weiser is an American composer of contemporary classical music.

== Early life and education ==
Weiser was born in New York City to a Jewish family. He attended Stuyvesant High School and Yale University, and received a master's degree in Music Theory and Composition from New York University. He studied with Paul Alan Levi, Martin Bresnick, Michael Gordon, and Julia Wolfe among others.

== Career ==
Weiser's debut album, and all the days were purple, was released by Cantaloupe Music in April 2019, and was named a 2020 Finalist for the Pulitzer Prize for Music. The album features singer Eliza Bagg singing songs set to poetry in Yiddish and English by poets including Anna Margolin, Rachel Korn, Abraham Sutzkever, Emily Dickinson, and William Carlos Williams. Probing contemporary Jewish identity, the album grew out of Weiser's work as the Director of Public Programs at the YIVO Institute for Jewish Research.

Weiser's album in a dark blue night, released by Cantaloupe Music in March 2024, features mezzo-soprano Annie Rosen and explores Jewish immigrant New York City through two song cycles. The first, "in a dark blue night," features five settings of Yiddish poetry written by newly arrived immigrants in the late 1800s and early 1900s which depict the city at night. The second song cycle, "Coney Island Days," sets to music the recorded memories of Weiser's late grandmother, discussing her childhood in the bustling immigrant world of Coney Island in the 1930s and 40s — days at the beach, at the family's knish store, and at the Russian bath.

Weiser has also written three operas that explore Jewish themes: State of the Jews, which is a historical drama about Theodor Herzl, The Great Dictionary of the Yiddish Language, a chamber opera about Yudel Mark, Max Weinreich, and the famous unfinished multi-volume Yiddish dictionary, and Tevye's Daughters, an opera focused of the tragic fate of a Tevye's daughter from the Sholem Aleichem story Shprintse.

Other works exploring Jewish themes include Weiser's Tfiles Clarinet Concerto commissioned by the POLIN Museum of the History of Polish Jews for Andrzej Cieplinski and the Polish Radio Orchestra which draws inspiration from poetry by Kadia Molodowsky, and after shir hashirim for chamber orchestra which takes its inspiration from the biblical Song of Songs.

Common themes in Weiser's work also include death and transience as exemplified by his work Three Epitaphs. Other major works have included shimmer for eight spatially arrayed cellos written for and recorded by Ashley Bathgate as a companion piece to Steve Reich's Cello Counterpoint, and water hollows stone for piano four hands, written for HOCKET.

In addition to his work as a composer and at YIVO, Weiser is co-founder and artistic director of Kettle Corn New Music, and worked for about five years as the Director of Operations and Development at the MATA Festival. Weiser is also active as a writer of prose on music, culture, and Jewish history. His articles have appeared in various outlets including Smithsonian Folklife Magazine, Jewish Renaissance, New Music Box, Tablet Magazine, and In Geveb.

== Discography ==
- and all the days were purple (Cantaloupe Music, 2019)
- water hollows stone (Bright Shiny Things, 2022)
- in a dark blue night (Cantaloupe Music, 2024)

Featured on

- HOCKET: #what2020soundslike (2022)
- Ashley Bathgate: 8-Track (New Focus Recordings, 2023)
- Vertex: joy, too (Navona Records, 2024)
