= Elpida Tsouri =

Greek politician

Elpida Tsouri (Greek: Ελπίδα Τσουρή, born 1961 in Chios, Greece), is a Member of Parliament in Greece for the majority party, the Panhellenic Socialist Movement (PASOK).

== Career ==
She studied at the Legal Faculty of the University of Thrace. For a number of years she served as a civil law notary. She was Chairman and Director of the Chios newspaper and radio “Democratic”.

== Political career ==
Elpida Tsouri was elected prefectoral advisor of Chios in 1994. She was re-elected prefectoral advisor in 1998. In the elections of 2000, she was elected to parliament from Chios constituency. She was the first woman from the Northern Aegean region elected to the National Delegation. In October 2001, during the 6th Congress of the PASOK party, she was elected member of the Central Committee of the party. In October 2001 she was appointed deputy minister at Ministry of Health and Social Solidarity. As deputy Minister she was responsible for the Olympic projects of the health sector, substance abuse, mental health, health education, acquisitions and health sector professions. She was re elected MP in 2004. In 2005 she became Secretary of the Committee of Commercial Shipping of PASOK. In 2007 she was elected, for the third time, MP, winning the majority of votes of the electoral district of Chios.
