= Charity Scott =

American legal scholar (1951–2023)

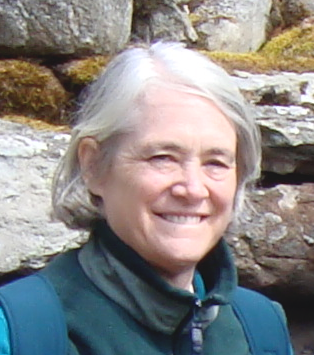
- Born: May 21, 1951; Boston, Massachusetts, U.S.
- Died: March 18, 2023 (aged 71)

Academic background
- Education: Harvard University (JD)

Charity Scott (May 21, 1951 – March 18, 2023) was an American legal scholar who was a professor of Law Emerita at Georgia State University, known for founding the Center for Law, Health, and Society at Georgia State University.

== Education and career ==
Scott came from a family of legal scholars, including her grandfather Austin Wakeman Scott. She grew up on the campus of Stanford University and in Westfield, New York. She attended Stanford University (BA in comparative literature) and graduated cum laude from Harvard Law School (J.D.) in 1979. After private legal practice in Baltimore and Atlanta, she first taught at the Emory University Business School and then joined the law faculty at Georgia State University (GSU) in 1988.

Scott's interest in health law began while she was in private practice in the early 1980s at Venable, Baetjer & Howard, where she was among the earliest to apply antitrust law to hospitals. This experience was an inspiration to develop programs on healthcare law after her switch to academia. According to U.S. News & World Report, the GSU Law School now ranks number two nationally in Health Care Law. GSU's health care law program is notable for community involvement with hospitals and with Georgia Legal Services through a clinic called The Health Law Partnership (HeLP) founded in 2007, and for the academic Center for Law, Health and Society.

Scott introduced many innovations into the teaching of law, including the incorporation of techniques from improv comedy in the legal classroom and designing courses on mindfulness and the law.

Scott died from cancer on March 18, 2023, at the age of 71.

== Awards and honors ==
Scott was an elected member of the American Law Institute. In 2006, she received the Jay Healey Distinguished Health Law Professor Award, presented by the American Society of Law, Medicine & Ethics. In 2010 she was the recipient of the Heroes in Healthcare Ethics Award, presented by the Health Care Ethics Consortium of Georgia. In 2016, she received a community service award for “Vision, Inspiration, and Resourcefulness in the Creation of the Health Law Partnership.” Scott was awarded the Health Law Community Service Award by the American Association of Law Schools’ Section on Law, Medicine, and Health Care in 2018. At GSU her awards have included the College of Law's David J. Maleski Award for Teaching Excellence and the Exceptional Service Award.
