= Charity Zisengwe =

- Born: Zimbabwe
- Origin: Mutoko, Zimbabwe
- Genres: A cappella, CCM, praise and worship, pop, inspirational
- Occupation(s): Intercessor, bible teacher, motivational/inspirational/christian speaker, singer-songwriter, arranger, worship leader, recording artist
- Instrument: Vocals
- Years active: 1997–present
- Labels: GFM
- Website: www.GloryFields.com www.CharitysMusic.com

Charity Zisengwe (pronounced as Zee-SANK-way) is a Zimbabwean intercessor, inspirational speaker, bible teacher, contemporary Christian music recording artist, worship leader and songwriter. In 2006 she founded Glory Fields Ministries. Her music has a cross-cultural feel, with a fusion of contemporary Christian and world music.

== Biography ==
=== Early years ===
Charity Zisengwe (pronounced as Zee-SANK-way) was born and raised in Mutoko, Zimbabwe and grew up in a Christian home where both parents were leaders in the United Methodist Church. Her father was the Lay Leader of their local congregation and her mother was the church treasurer and head of the women's ministry for many years. She is the 7th of nine siblings. Charity has three brothers and 4 sisters. Her eldest brother died in 1996. Her mother died in 2003 and her father in 2005.

Charity became a Christian during her first year at Murewa High School in Zimbabwe. As a student at Murewa High School, Charity formed a trio with two of her dormitory roommates, Rhoda Chani and Kezzie Ndori, during her third year. Many students began to join the trio, which subsequently grew to a mass choir of more than 50 students. During her years in high school she was also one of the leaders of Scripture Union, a non-denominational Christian group at the school.

After high school Charity moved to New Jersey to attend college. She graduated from Montclair State University (NJ) with a BSc degree in Business majoring in marketing. The following year she earned her Post Graduate Diploma in Marketing from The Chartered Institute of Marketing in London, (UK).

== Ministry ==
=== Intercession Ministry ===
Charity Zisengwe began her ministry as an intercessor in 1997. Previously to this, she had participated in the intercessory ministry and many other ministries in church.

=== Speaking career ===
In 2008 she began to share her testimony about living single and she has been invited to speak at women's events, by women who have watched her videos on her website. She has also been invited to youth events where she has encouraged high school age students and younger, to make right choices while they are still young. Charity has appeared on Atlanta's TV57 on Babbie's House and Atlanta Live, and Watchmen Broadcasting's Club36 to talk about her ministry.

=== Songwriting career ===
In December 2003 Charity Zisengwe began to write her own songs. In May 2004 she attended the Babbie Mason Music Conference International to learn more about the art of songwriting, and the music ministry as a whole. After that conference which was held at the Simpsonwood Retreat in Norcross, GA, Charity rewrote all her songs before going into the studio to record. She returned to the conference in 2006 and this time she participated in the songwriting competition and one of her songs titled There Is A Way, won first place.

=== Recording career ===
Charity went to Jeffrey B Rogers Music and Creative Services studio to record her debut CD, without back-up singers. Rogers produced her album. She recorded all the vocals, with all three-part harmonies. In 2006 "There Is A Way", one of the songs on her self-titled debut CD, won the first place prize in the songwriting competition at The Babbie Mason Music Conference International Charity Zisengwe was recorded in two versions, an a cappella released in 2007 and a music version, released in 2008 which she subsequently titled Introducing Charity Z.

In October 2010 Charity released her second CD titled AMAZING. This project was produced by Sonny Lallerstedt, a worship leader in Marietta, GA. AMAZING is an 11-track project of original songs that were written by Charity.

Charity has also had the opportunity to share the stage with international gospel singer and her mentor, Babbie Mason.

== Discography ==
=== Albums ===
AMAZING

- Released: October 2010
- Format: CD
- Writer: Charity Zisengwe
- Producer: Sonny Lallerstedt

Introducing Charity Z

- Released: February 2008
- Format: CD
- Writer: Charity Zisengwe
- Producer: Jeffrey B. Rogers

Charity Zisengwe (a cappella )

- Released: 2007
- Format: CD
- Writer: Charity Zisengwe
- Producer: Jeffrey B. Rogers

== Additional sources ==
- Jeff Rogers
- Babbie Mason Ministries
- Charity Zisengwe's Official Site
- WATC TV57, Atlanta, GA
- WBPI Watchmen Broadcasting, North Augusta, SC
- Montclair State University Official Site
- Chartered Institute of Marketing Site
