= Hope Eghagha =

Nigerian writer and academic (born 1959)

Professor Hope Oghenerukevbe Eghagha

Commissioner for Higher Education (Delta State)
- In office January 2009 – December 2014
- Succeeded by: Patrick Muoboghare

Commissioner for Government House (Delta State)
- In office December 2014 – May 2015

Personal details
- Education: University of Jos
- Occupation: Writer, academician
- Awards: Honorary Colonel Commonwealth of Kentucky, Honorary captain belle of Louisville

Hope Oghenerukevbe Eghagha (born 4 September 1959) is a Nigerian professor of English Literature and Literary Analysis in the Faculty of Arts, University of Lagos, currently researching on dramatic theory and criticism. He is a playwright, poet, novelist, biographer and a columnist in The Guardian newspaper (Nigeria) editorial board. Through his weekly newspaper opinion articles, he explores complex challenges in Nigeria.

Eghagha's first play, entitled Death, Not a Redeemer (published 1998), is a recommended text in many universities in Nigeria. His other plays include, Onawawi Shall Rise Again, Oily Marriage and Two Mothers and Son. He has written six different collections of poetry: Mama Dances Into the Night, Pepper in my Throat, Rhythms of the Last Testament, Premonitions and Other Dreams, The Governor’s Lodge, and This Story Must Not Be Told. He has also written a novel, Emperors of Salvation. There are publications on Hope Eghagha's writings, including the critical text entitled In Theory and Practice, Engaging the Writings of Hope Eghagha, edited by Dr Patrick Oloko. The text has been cited by scholars "across the world".

Eghagha was appointed Commissioner for Higher Education in Delta State by the former governor of Delta State, Dr. Emmanuel Uduaghan, in January 2009, serving until December 2014. He was reappointed Delta State Commissioner Government House from December 2014 to May 2015. Midway into his tenure as Commissioner in 2012, Eghagha was kidnapped but regained freedom after sixteen days. That encounter made him write a short story entitled "Your Death Hour is 10 O’clock". He was Acting Dean Faculty of Arts University of Lagos in 2015 and Head of Department of English, University of Lagos from 2016 to 2019. Eghagha has supervised many PhDs and was made a full professor in 2010. Eghagha is Honorary Colonel of the Commonwealth of Kentucky US (1999) and Honorary Captain of the Belle of Louisville (1999).

== Early life and education ==
Hope Eghagha was born on 4 September 1959 in Burutu, Delta State. He hails from Mereje in Okpe local government area of Delta State. He began education in Zik Grammar School Sapele, Delta State in 1972. After graduating with a West African School Certificate (Division II) in 1976, he attended Baptist High School Port Harcourt, in Rivers State. He graduated with a Higher School Certificate in 1978. Eghagha gained admission into University of Jos in Plateau State in 1978. to study Theatre Arts. He earned a BA (Hons) degree (2nd-class Upper Division) in 1982. He obtained his MA and Ph.D in English from the University of Lagos in 1984 and 1994 respectively.

== Career ==
Eghagha was appointed a producer with the Nigerian Television Authority Sokoto during his NYSC programme in 1982. In 1985, he was appointed Graduate Assistant in the Department of English, University of Lagos. in 1988, he transferred to Ondo State University, Ado Ekiti (now University of Ado Ekiti) as Lecturer II. He was Secretary, Academic Staff Union of Universities, Ondo State University chapter and the sub Dean, Faculty of Arts, Ondo State University, Ado Ekiti from 1993 to 1994. In 1994, he returned to the University of Lagos as Lecturer I and grew through the ranks until becoming a full professor in 2010. From 1999, he began to contribute as a columnist to The Guardian newspapers, writing opinions aimed at positive societal transformation. Eghagha was appointed Commissioner for Higher Education in Delta State by the then governor of Delta State, Dr Emmanuel Uduaghan, in January 2009. In December 2014, Eghagha was reappointed as Delta State Commissioner Government House, serving until May 2015. He was appointed Acting Dean Faculty of Arts University of Lagos in November 2015. In August 2016, he became the Head, Department of English, University of Lagos, serving until 2019. On 2 May 2023, the then Delta State Governor-elect, Sheriff Oborevwori, inaugurated an 88-man transition committee set up in preparation for his inauguration as governor, on 29 May 2023. Eghagha served as secretary of the Committee.

== Literary works ==
Hope Eghagha revealed that he is a "literary child of JP Clark", and like Clark, he ventured into multiple genres in literature. His literary works include

- Death, Not a Redeemer (his first play, published 1998), which became a recommended text in many universities in Nigeria.
- Onawawi Shall Rise Again (play),
- Oily Marriage (play)
- Two Mothers and Son (play)
- Mama Dances Into the Night (poetry)
- Petticoat Power (2016, poetry)
- Pepper in my Throat (poetry)
- Rhythms of the Last Testament (poetry)
- Premonitions and Other Dreams (poetry)
- The Governor's Lodge (poetry)
- This Story Must Not Be Told (poetry)
- Emperors of Salvation (novel)
- E.K. Clark: Portrait of a Patriot (2008, biography)
- F.M.O. Osifo: From Machine Boy to Managing Director (biography)

== Membership ==
Eghagha is a member of the Nigerian Academy of Letters; Nigerian Folklore Society; Association of Nigerian Authors; and the African Literature Association (ALA).

== Recognitions ==
Eghagha was granted a fellowship by the US government to study contemporary American literature at the University of Louisville from June to August 1999. In 1999, he was also named Honorary Captain of the Belle of Louisville and Honorary Colonel of the Commonwealth of Kentucky, United States of America. In 2007, he was awarded a Ford Foundation grant to travel to the United States, South Africa, and Nairobi to present his poetry and publicize Black Orphans. He has also received an honorable mention in the 2007 Pat Utomi Award for Literary Excellence.

== Personal life ==
Hope Eghagha married his wife Patricia in 1984 and the couple have four children and many grandchildren.
