= Hope Harmel Smith =

American television producer and writer

Hope Harmel Smith (also created as Hope H. Smith) is an American television producer and writer. She has been working in daytime for over 20 years.

== Positions held ==
All My Children

- Writer: October 2007 - July 2008
- Supervising Producer: January 4, 2010 to present (hired by Julie Hanan Carruthers)

The Bold and the Beautiful (hired by William J. Bell)

- Associate Producer: 1987 - 1988
- Producer: 1988 - 1996

General Hospital (hired by Wendy Riche)

- Producer: 1998 - 1999
- Consultant: 1997 - 1998

Guiding Light

- Production Coordinator: 1983 - 1985
- Producer: 1985 - 1987

Port Charles

- Producer: 1999 - 2003

Starting Over

- Writer/Producer: 2004

Sunset Beach

- Supervising Producer: 1996 - 1997

== Awards and nominations ==
Daytime Emmy Award

- Nomination, 2003, Drama Series, Port Charles
- Win, 1999, Drama Series, General Hospital
