= Hope Weiler =

Canadian scientist

- Education: University of Guelph; McMaster University
- Scientific career
- Fields: Nutrition
- Workplaces: McGill University

Hope A. Weiler is a Canadian nutritionist and associate professor in the School of Dietetics and Human Nutrition at the McGill University Faculty of Agricultural and Environmental Sciences.

She holds a B.A.Sc. in Applied Human Nutrition from the University of Guelph and a Ph.D. in Medical Sciences, Cell Biology and Metabolism, from McMaster University. As of 2018, she is a Canada Research Chair Tier 1 in Nutrition and Health Across the Lifespan at McGill University. Her research specialty is the prevention of osteoporosis.

Her work includes research on childhood obesity. Based on results from a 2012 study, she suggested that activities to build a child's muscle mass are more important than diets targeted toward weight loss. She has also studied the effect of dietary supplements such as Vitamin D to enhance muscle growth in infants and toddlers.
