= Hope Winch =

English pharmacist and academic

- Born: 1894
- Died: 8 April 1944 (aged 49–50); Lake District, United Kingdom
- Education: Royal Victoria Infirmary, Newcastle upon Tyne
- Alma mater: School of Pharmacy, University of London
- Occupation: Senior Lecturer in Pharmacy
- Years active: 1920-1944
- Employer: University of Sunderland
- Known for: Founder of the pharmaceutical department at the Sunderland Technical College, predecessor to the University of Sunderland.

Hope Constance Monica Winch (1894 – 8 April 1944) was an English pharmacist and academic.

== Biography ==
Winch was born in the vicarage in the village of Brompton, just outside Northallerton in North Yorkshire, where her father Reverend George Winch was vicar of the village's St Thomas' Church. Her mother, Elizabeth Maude Winch (née Crofton) was the daughter of Thomas Buston Crofton, also from the village.

Winch attended the Clergy Daughters' School in Casterton, Kirkby Lonsdale. After completing her secondary education, she trained for a year at the Royal Victoria Infirmary in Newcastle upon Tyne, learning practical aspects of pharmacy. She passed the Society of Apothecaries 'Apothecaries' Assistant Examination' in July 1913, achieving the highest marks within her cohort across all three exams of Practical Pharmacy, Materia Medica, Prescriptions and Pharmacy, and Chemistry. It is not clear what role she took on next, probably continuing to work at the Royal Victoria Infirmary, although other sources suggest that she might also have spent time working as a dispenser for Dr. C.R. Graham, a surgeon in Wigan.

Winch then moved to London and studied at the School of Pharmacy of the Pharmaceutical Society of Great Britain, qualifying as a Chemist and Druggist on 30 June 1917. She was clearly an extremely able student, and won a Bronze medal for Botany, and Certificates of Honour for both Chemistry and Materia Medica in the Minor Exam. This led to her being awarded the Hewlett Exhibition, an annual award, set up in the memory of Mr. J. Hewlett, a wholesale and export druggist. The Exhibition, worth £15, enabled the winner to attend the next session of the Major course at the School. The Major exam was an academically-challenging qualification, intended for those pharmacists considering a career in research or as the proprietor of a business. Unlike the Minor exam, which was a requirement for inclusion on the PSGB Register and therefore to work as a Chemist and Druggist, the Major exam was entirely voluntary and the subsequent restricted title of Pharmaceutical Chemist was highly-regarded.

Hope Winch passed the Major exam, and registered as a Pharmaceutical Chemist on 5 April 1918. She was awarded the Pereira Medal, named in memory of Jonathan Pereira, first professor of materia medica at the School, having come top in an additional competitive exam in materia medica, botany and chemistry amongst recent Pharmaceutical Chemists. She was only the fifth woman to win the Medal since its institution in the 1864 and was reported in the Pharmaceutical Journal as winning it "with flying colours." She also gained the Pharmaceutical Society's bronze and silver medals in Botany and the silver medal in Materia Medica.

Winch was then awarded the Redwood Scholarship, an award made in memory of Professor Theophilus Redwood, the School's first professor of chemistry and pharmacy. The Scholarship, worth £60, was awarded every second year to pursue pharmaceutical chemistry research in the Society's research laboratory. At the end of two years, Winch also qualified as an Associate of the Institute of Chemistry.

In September 1920, Hope Winch took up the role of Lecturer in Pharmacy at Rutherford College, Newcastle upon Tyne, but she was reportedly unhappy with conditions there. She transferred to Sunderland Technical College as its first full-time pharmacy lecturer on 1 September 1921 in line with the Pharmaceutical Society's approval of the transfer of all pharmacy teaching to Sunderland from Newcastle. She was the College's first full-time lecturer in the field, and began by teaching three students and 25 ex-servicemen. In 1926, two additional lecturers were appointed and Winch opened a dispensary; in 1928, she opened a laboratory for drug preparation. She was appointed as head of a new independent Department of Pharmacy in 1928. Winch's avowed ambition was to set up the finest pharmacy department in the North East of England. In 1930 the College's pharmacy department was recognised by the University of London for teaching its external bachelor of pharmacy degree, one of the first such recognitions in England.

She also became well established in the local pharmacy community, serving as Secretary of the Local Branch of the Pharmaceutical Society for over 20 years, and then as Chairman.

=== Death and legacy ===
Hope Winch died in a tragic climbing accident on 8 April 1944. While staying at Burnthwaite in the Lake District during the Easter holiday, she climbed Scafell, a summit she had successfully conquered a number of times before. In fact, she was a member of the Rocks and Fells Climbing Club and had a wide experience of climbing including in the Alps. She had spent almost every holiday climbing in the Lake District, often acting as leader of climbing parties. On this occasion, she was climbing with Walter Johan de Cort, aged 14, a Belgian refugee of Slaithwaite, near Huddersfield. At the subsequent inquest, he told the Coroner that he had no previous experience in climbing. Winch decided that day to climb Deep Ghyll, a chasm on Scafell, which she described to de Cort as a strenuous climb. His testimony explained that at an awkward corner, while he was belayed on the rope and Winch was about ten feet above him, she seemed to let go and bounced out from the rock. She fell about 140 feet and de Cort said he attracted the attention of other climbers, who went to the rescue, forming a stretcher party and making "the difficult climb in moonlight carrying torches." She had a broken neck and severe head injuries, and the inquest concluded that she may have suffered a temporary black-out, noting that she had recently had scarlet fever and had suffered a black-out while driving, a short time before. A verdict of "Accidental death" was recorded. Hope Winch's funeral was held at Newcastle-upon-Tyne Crematorium. Her ashes were scattered on Great Gable in the Lake District.

To commemorate her memory, a scholarship fund known as the Hope CM Winch Memorial Fund was founded on 28 April 1944, by a representative committee of Sunderland and District Branch of the Pharmaceutical Society, Sunderland Technical College staff and old students. The basis of the fund was a surplus of £12 5shillings raised from refresher courses held by the Branch in early 1944. Following an appeal in the Pharmaceutical Journal and through local contacts, by 11 January 1945, the fund stood at £489 11shillings and 10 pence. It was agreed that an annual scholarship would be awarded to pay a student's tuition fees for one college session.

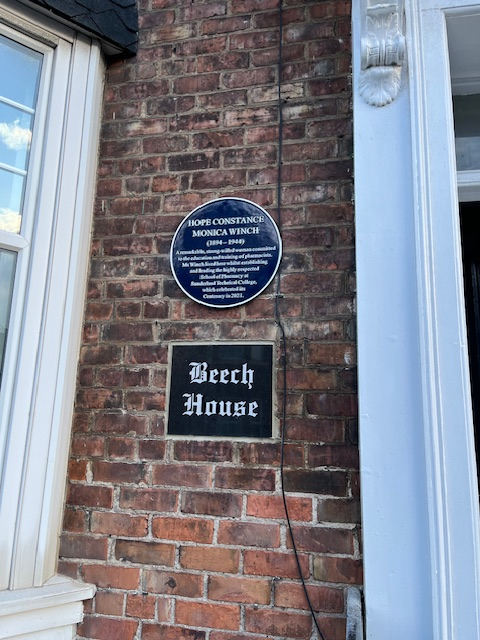
The blue plaque commemorating Winch's life and achievements

The first recipient of the award was George Dempster Fairweather, chosen from the 1947–1948 cohort, to pay for his fees for that years session. He was officially presented with the prize at the School's first Prize Presentation Ceremony, held in January 1949. Head of Department, Rowson used the scholarship as a catalyst to stage a broader presentation ceremony with a number of prizes supported by local pharmacists and the pharmaceutical industry, and with an address given by a noted pharmacist G.E .Trease. His aim, to raise the department's profile and encourage its development, was not greeted with support from all Technical College colleagues, but the event was a success with a total of ten prizes awarded. In 1954, a certificate was designed for the successful recipient of the Hope Winch Scholarship by the Sunderland College of Arts and Crafts, and in 1957 an honours board with past and future scholarship holders was placed in the department.

Hope Winch is still very much remembered through a society for former students, which bears her name and the awarding of the Hope Winch memorial prize to the most outstanding student in the first two years of the course. The Hope Winch Society was founded in 1984. The prize also consists of a solid sculptured glass weighing 1.5Kg with the winners named on it. The award is presented at the annual Hope Winch Lecture, an award ceremony with a lecture from a high-ranking pharmacist.

A commemorative blue plaque was dedicated in January 2024 by the University of Sunderland's Hope Winch Society. The plaque was installed at 11 Beechwood Street in Sunderland where Winch once lived.
