= Hope Hill Van Beuren =

Hope Hill van Beuren is a Campbell Soup heiress whose net worth was estimated by Forbes to be about $1.1 billion as of March 2011. Her grandfather, John Thompson Dorrance, invented the condensed soup process.

== Personal life ==
She and her husband, John van Beuren, announced their engagement in 1954. They have three children and live in Middletown, Rhode Island.

== Philanthropy ==
The van Beuren Charitable Foundation was founded by Hope and John van Beuren in 1986.
