= Charity Wright Cook =

American Quaker minister (1745–1822)

Charity Wright Cook (1745–1822) was an American Quaker minister.

Cook was born in Prince George's County, Maryland, but moved with her family to the area of Cane Creek, North Carolina, at the age of three; they moved again, probably in 1760, to Bush River, Newberry County, South Carolina. There she met Isaac Cook, a Quaker, whom she would go on to marry. In 1760 an accusation of sexual impropriety was levied against her, and as a result she was estranged from the Quaker community for eight years. Even so, in 1762 she married Isaac Cook, with whom she would go on to have 11 children. By 1772, the controversy having abated, the Bush River Quaker Meeting commissioned her as a preacher. During the American Revolutionary War Cook traveled around the Southern United States preaching adherence to pacifism. In 1797 she traveled to Europe to tour Quaker meetings there; she returned to the United States in 1802, whereupon she and Isaac established new meetings in Ohio and Indiana. Cook died in Clinton County, Ohio, and is buried in Caesar Creek Cemetery in Waynesville.
