= Elpis (wife of Boethius) =

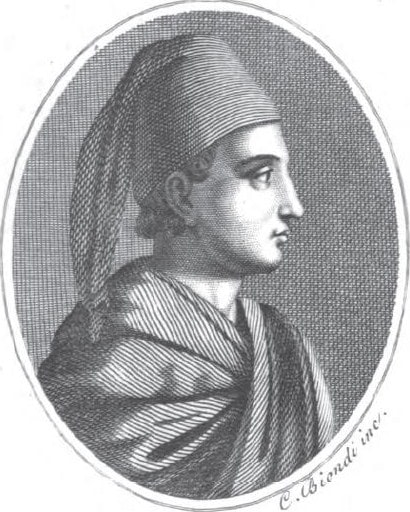
Imaginative portrait, 1819

Elpis (died c. AD 504), also known as Elphe or Elpide, was a Latin poet and hymnographer, and the first wife of Boethius. Two hymns of praise to the apostles Peter and Paul are traditionally attributed to her.

== Life ==
Elpis, first wife of the celebrated philosopher Boethius, was the daughter of Festus, Consul at Rome in AD 472, and sister of the mother of Saint Placidus, a disciple of Saint Benedict. The hymn "Aurea luce et decore roseo" is usually, but somewhat uncertainly, attributed to her. Others also bear her name. She died at an early age, at Padua.

== Hymns ==
=== "Aurea luce et decore roseo" ===
This hymn, for the Festival of Peter and Paul, is probably of the 6th century. It has generally been ascribed to Elpis, wife of the philosopher Boethius; but Mone, on the ground that it is not in classical metre, thinks that this is improbable. Mone's text is from MSS. of the 14th and 15th centuries. Daniel gives the text in six staves, along with the Roman Breviary version; with further notes, including readings from a 9th century MS. at Bern. Among the British Library MSS. it is found in two of the 11th century. The text of an 11th century MS. at Durham is given by Stevenson.

This hymn is found in many breviaries, for example, the older Roman, the York, and the Sarum, assigned to the vigils of Saints Peter and Paul, et cetera. Stave 3, for Saint Peter, beginning, "Jam bone pastor Petre", was used separately for the festivals of Saint Peter's Chair and Saint Peter's Chains. Stave 4 for Saint Paul, beginning, "Doctor egregie, Paule", was also used separately for the festivals of his Conversion, et cetera.

In the revised Roman Breviary, 1632, it was considerably altered, stave 1, beginning "Decora lux aeternitatis auream"; stave 3 beginning "Beate pastor Petre"; and stave 4 beginning "Egregie doctor Paule". This form is also in Daniel.

== Sources ==
- Boezio Severino (1765). Della consolazione della filosofia. Tradotto dalla lingua latina in volgar fiorentino da Benedetto Varchi. Venice: Giambatista Novelli. pp. 163–165.
- Chambers, John David (1866). Lauda Syon: Ancient Latin Hymns of the English and other Churches. Part 2. London: J. Masters; Novello & Co. pp. 80–81.
- Daniel, Hermann Adalbert (1862). Thesaurus hymnologicus. Vol. 1. Leipzig: J. T. Loeschke. pp. 153–154. [No. 137].
- ——— (1855). Thesaurus hymnologicus. Vol. 4. Leipzig: J. T. Loeschke. pp. 164, 371.
- Julian, John (1907). A Dictionary of Hymnology. 2nd ed. Vol. 1: A to O. New York, NY: Dover Publications, Inc. p. 93, 329.
- Migliorato, Alessandra (2012). "Il rilievo di Elpide nel museo regionale di Messina: nuove proposte di lettura". Archivio Storico Messinese, no. 93: pp. 411–425.
- Mone, Franz (1855). Lateinische Hymnen des Mittelalters. Vol. 3. Freiburg im Breisgau: Herder'sche Verlagshandlung. pp. 90–91. [No. 684].
- Narbone, Alessio (1856). Istoria della letteratura siciliana. Vol. 5. Palermo: Carini. pp. 156–161.
- Ortolani, Giuseppe Emanuele (1819). Biografia degli uomini illustri della Sicilia. Vol. 3. Naples: Nicola Gervasi. pp. 123–126.
- Stevenson, Joseph (1851). The Latin Hymns of the Anglo-Saxon Church. Durham: George Andrews. p. 105.
