= Charity Ekezie =

Nigerian TikToker and journalist

Charity Chiamaka Ekezie
- Born: Nigeria
- Education: Nnamdi Azikiwe University

TikTok information
- Page: Charityekezie
- Years active: 2020–present
- Genre: Comedy
- Followers: 3.5 million
- Last updated: 12 October 2025

Charity Ekezie is a Nigerian TikToker and journalist.

== Early life and education ==
Ekezie grew up in Douala, Cameroon, where she spent her childhood and completed her primary education. She moved to Nigeria in 2001, at the age of 10.

She earned a degree in mass communication from Nnamdi Azikiwe University.

== Career ==
Ekezie worked at a radio station for three and a half years. She also had a few online businesses, which have been inactive since 2020.

She joined TikTok in 2020 due to boredom caused by the COVID-19 pandemic. Her first video to go viral involved her wearing traditional outfits from several African countries. When she began receiving ignorant comments on the video, she decided to respond to them sarcastically. Since then, Ekezie's content has largely focused on sarcastically correcting misconceptions of Africa. One video has Ekezie telling viewers that Africans drink saliva due to lack of water, while holding a bottle of water; another video has her telling viewers that Africa is one country whose capital is Wakanda. Ekezie has also criticized TikTok for not expanding their Creator Fund program to African users, meaning African TikTokers cannot make money from their videos.

As of January 2023, 60% of Ekezie's followers were located in the United States. In July 2022, Ekezie had 1.2 million followers; by February 2023, her following had increased to over 2 million.

Ekezie has said that she wants to return to journalism as a career in the future.

== Awards and recognition ==
In December 2022, NPR counted Ekezie as one of their top global TikTok accounts.

In January 2023, Ekezie was declared runner-up for TikTok's Top Creator 2022 Sub-Saharan Africa award.

== Personal life ==
Ekezie is fluent in both English and French. She has two younger brothers. She has suffered from bullying throughout her life, and has developed anxiety as a result.

As of 2022, she lives in Abuja, Nigeria.
