= Storm Elpis =

Winter storm in January 2022

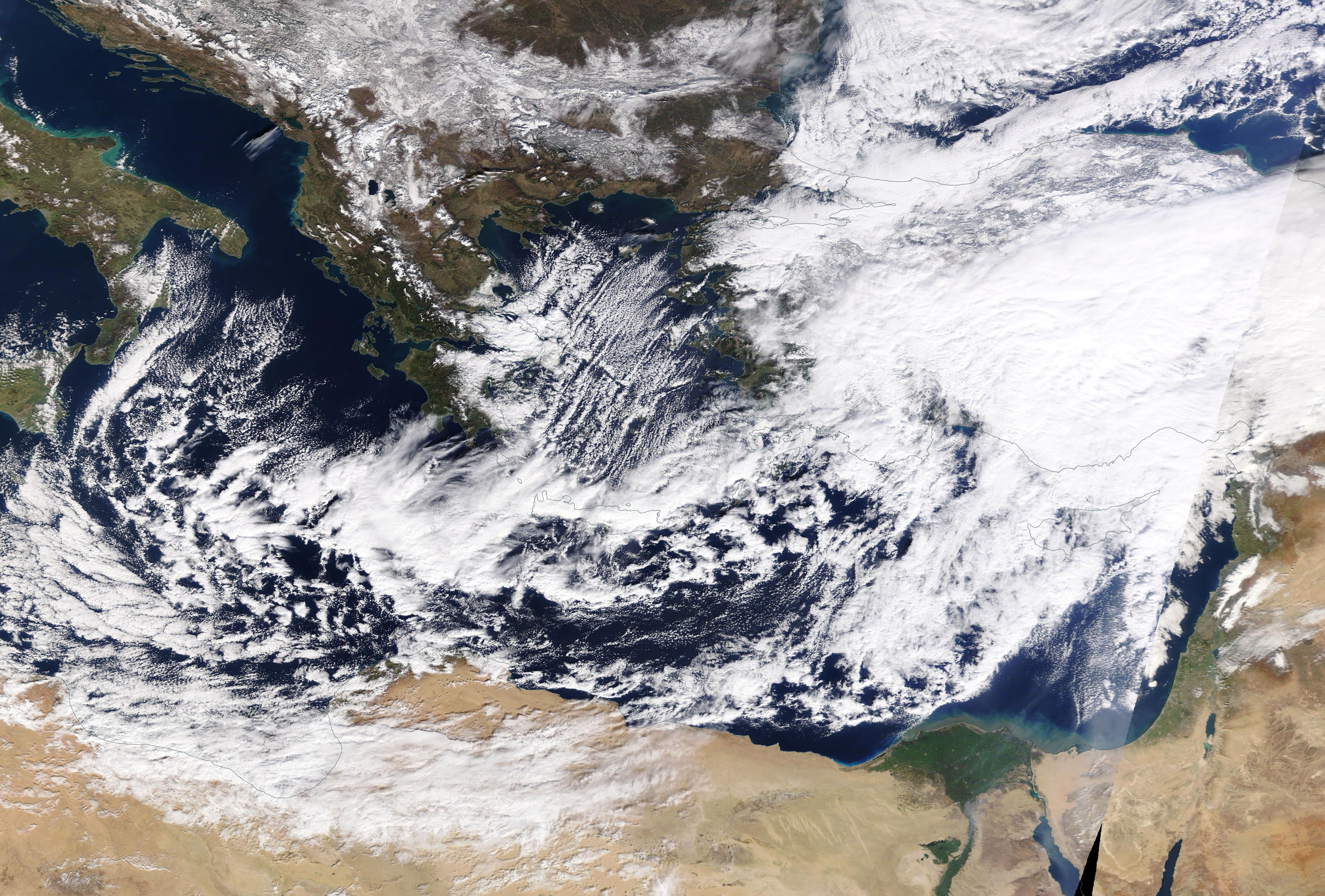
- Elpis on January 25

Meteorological history
- Formed: 21 January 2022
- Dissipated: 27 January 2022

Unknown-strength storm
- 1-minute sustained (SSHWS)
- Highest gusts: 70 mph (110 km/h) near Milos, Greece

Blizzard
- Lowest temp: −33.4 °C (−28.1 °F), Kosanica, Montenegro on January 25
- Max. snowfall: At least 85 centimetres (2.79 ft; 33 in), near Istanbul, Turkey

Overall effects
- Fatalities: 3
- Part of the 2021-22 European windstorm season

Elpis, or Elpida in Greece, was a windstorm and blizzard that affected most of the Eastern Mediterranean in late January 2022. The storm caused blizzard conditions in northern Turkey and mountainous areas of Greece, as well as accumulating snowfall in milder locations further south, such as Athens, Antalya and Israel.

== Meteorological history ==
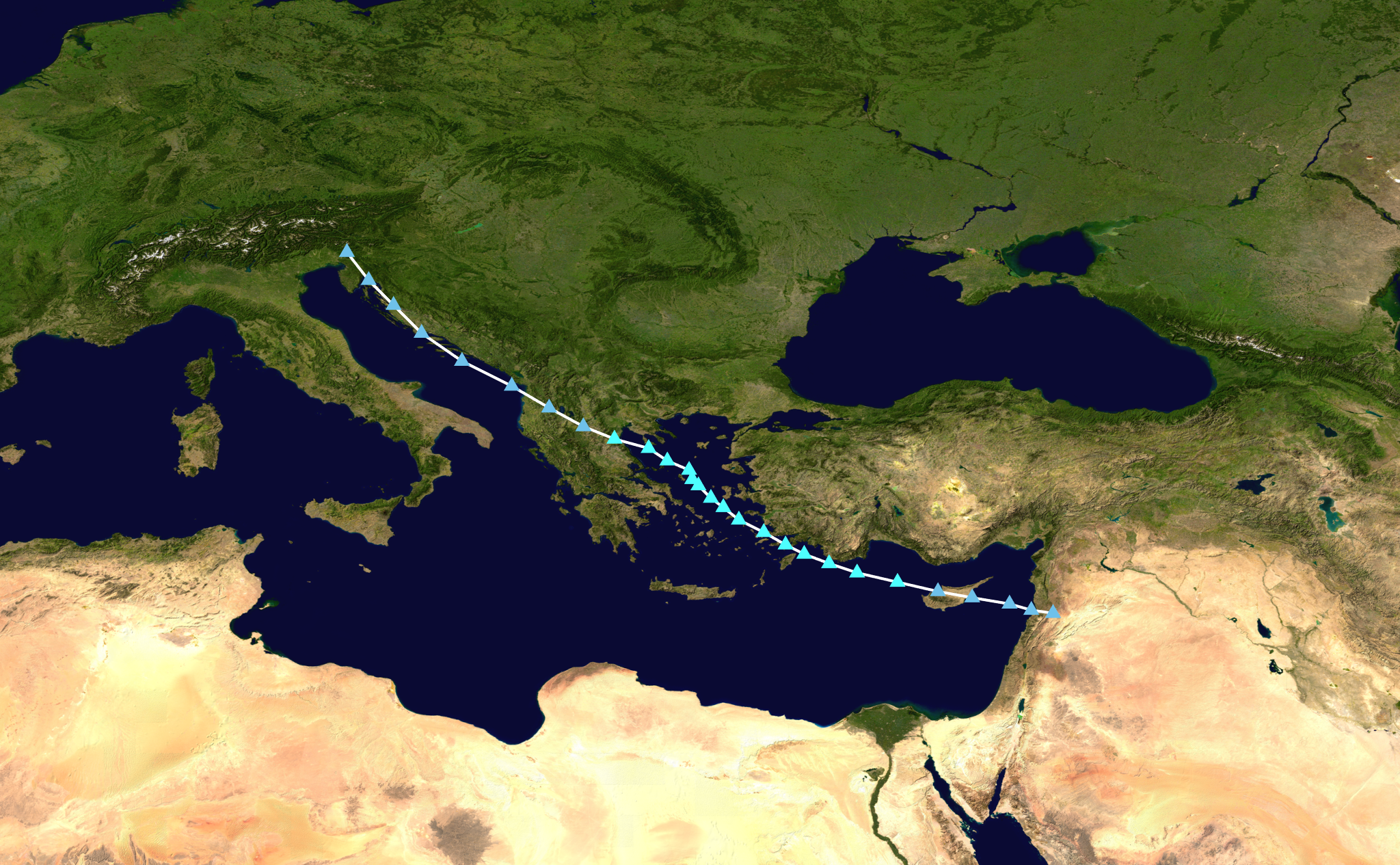
Map plotting the storm's track and intensity, according to the Saffir–Simpson scale Map key Saffir–Simpson scale Tropical depression (≤38 mph, ≤62 km/h) Tropical storm (39–73 mph, 63–118 km/h) Category 1 (74–95 mph, 119–153 km/h) Category 2 (96–110 mph, 154–177 km/h) Category 3 (111–129 mph, 178–208 km/h) Category 4 (130–156 mph, 209–251 km/h) Category 5 (≥157 mph, ≥252 km/h) Unknown Storm type Tropical cyclone Subtropical cyclone Extratropical cyclone, remnant low, tropical disturbance, or monsoon depression

=== Antecedent weather ===
Atmospheric conditions in the weeks leading up to Elpis were defined by a change of large-scale weather patterns: a persistent ridge formed over Western Europe and a series of dips in the jet stream occurred to its east. This, in turn, caused repeated instances of polar air outbreaks into the Balkans and the Eastern Mediterranean. Diomedes, an earlier and relatively minor storm, had already brought heavy rain and mountain snow to Greece, while causing significant sea-level snowfall in the normally colder region of northern Turkey.

A weak low formed near Aegean Sea on 21 January, partially due to the southeastward movement of a stronger low in western Russia, associated with the synoptic structure that had been forcing polar air southwards toward Southeast Europe. While the resulting conditions were also conducive for frontal snowfall, due to the temperature difference between the warm seas and the arriving polar air, lake-effect snow squalls were forecast to be the main contributor to snow totals.

=== Initial frontal precipitation ===
As cold air continued its southerly movement, the moderately heavy rain that had started to affect Thrace and northwestern Anatolia, eventually transitioned into snow. Despite this, snowfall accumulations were limited even in northern coastal regions such as Istanbul, due to above freezing temperatures. Heavy rain continued in southwestern Turkey and southeastern Greece, as rainfall amounts in excess of 70 millimetres (2.8 in), in the Dodecanese, Crete, and Antalya, were recorded. The heaviest snow remained near southern Marmara, as the initial storm tracked southeast through the day, exiting western Turkey by that evening.

=== Convective vortex over Istanbul ===
The abnormally cold air mass, especially in the upper atmosphere, and vertical profiles made it conducive for convection in the Black Sea off the shores of Istanbul, and subsequently enabled the formation of large bands of convective clouds, which formed into a cyclonic vortex structure on January 24, 2022. This vortex caused unprecedented rates of snowfall, high winds and blizzard conditions in the western parts of Istanbul.

== Impact ==
Storm Elpis dropped heavy snow in the western and northern parts of Turkey, Greece and Jerusalem, as well as bringing impacts to Athens and accumulating snow as far south as Antalya. The blizzard suspended intercity transport and closed Istanbul Airport. Rescue operations were underway in various cities, including the capital Ankara, to rescue thousands of people trapped in the snow. Motorists were stuck in their cars in Attiki Odos, the main ring road of Athens, for 24 hours. The Greek army was ordered to help motorists by delivering food, water, and blankets. Around 3500 people were saved from the ring road but 1200 cars remained stuck due to freezing conditions. Fifteen passengers were injured when operators tried to pull a train stuck in the snow and carrying about 200 passengers. The Hellenic National Meteorological Service reported that a landspout occurred on Andros due to the storm. Due to the instability of the cold air passing through warm waters above the Aegean Sea, the weather front also caused thundersnows in the regions of Euboea and Attica and a snowspout in Andros. In addition, very low temperatures were recorded in Greece; the lowest was recorded in Lefkochori, Phthiotis at −18.1 °C (−0.6 °F). Further north, Montenegro set a national low temperature record of −33.4 °C (−28.1 °F).

Elpis went as far as Israel by starting with heavy rain in the North and coastal areas. Snow fell throughout the day in Mount Hermon, northern Golan Heights and in the mountains of northern and central Israel, including in Safed and Jerusalem in the early hours of January 27, 2022. Three people died in Israel from carbon monoxide poisoning.

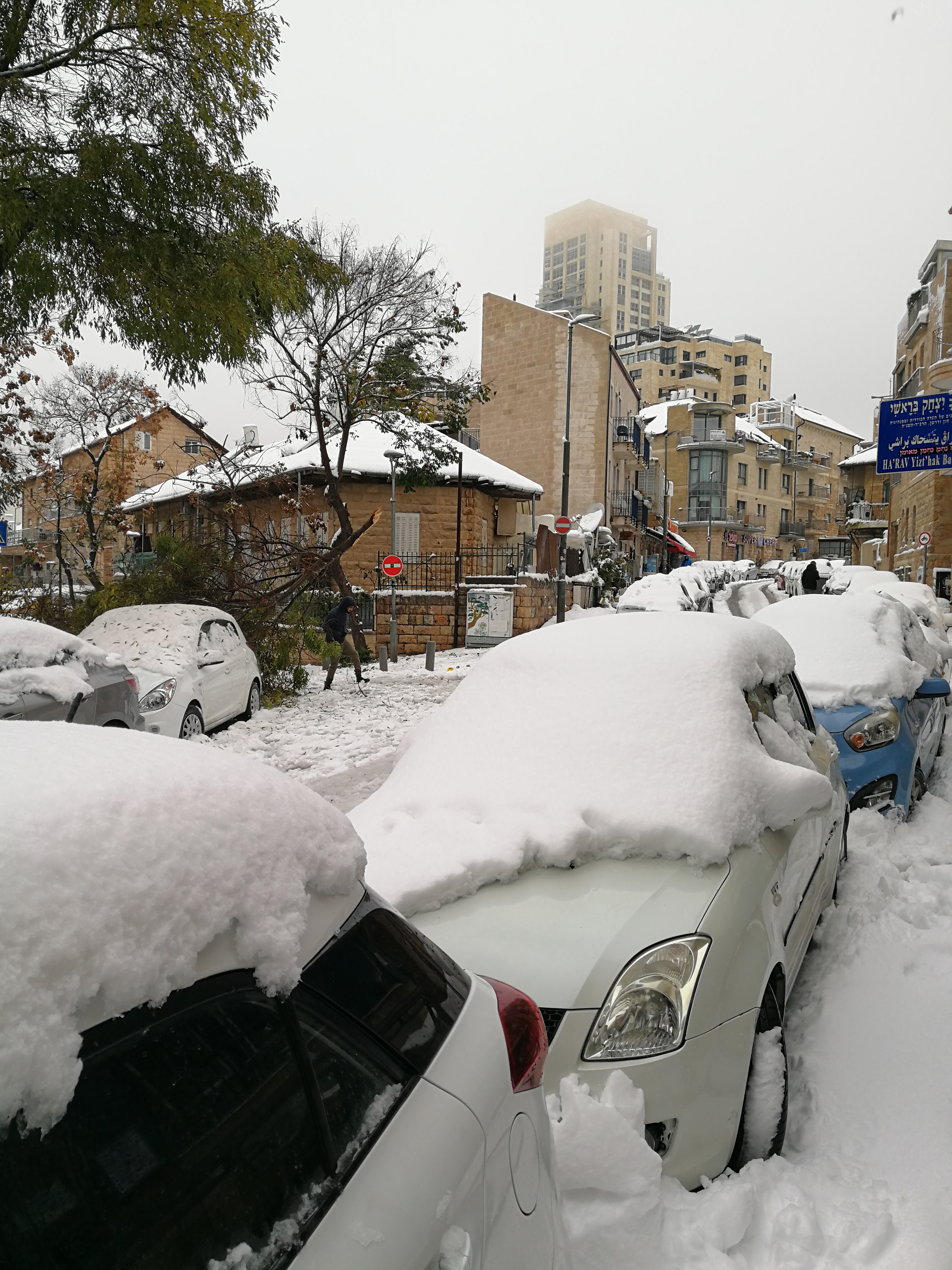
The effects of Elpis in the Jerusalem neighborhood of Nachlaot

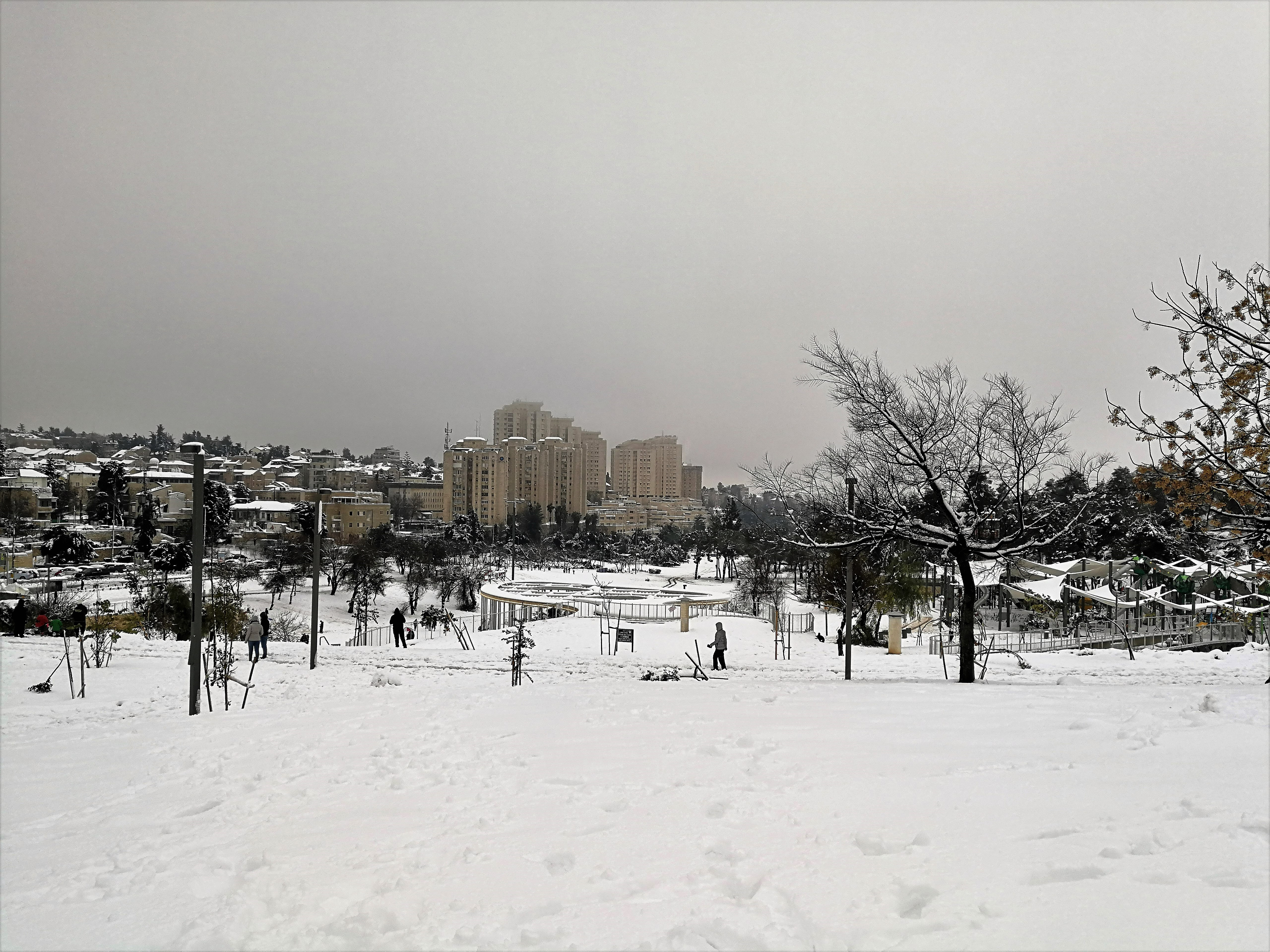
Sacher Park in Jerusalem, covered with snow

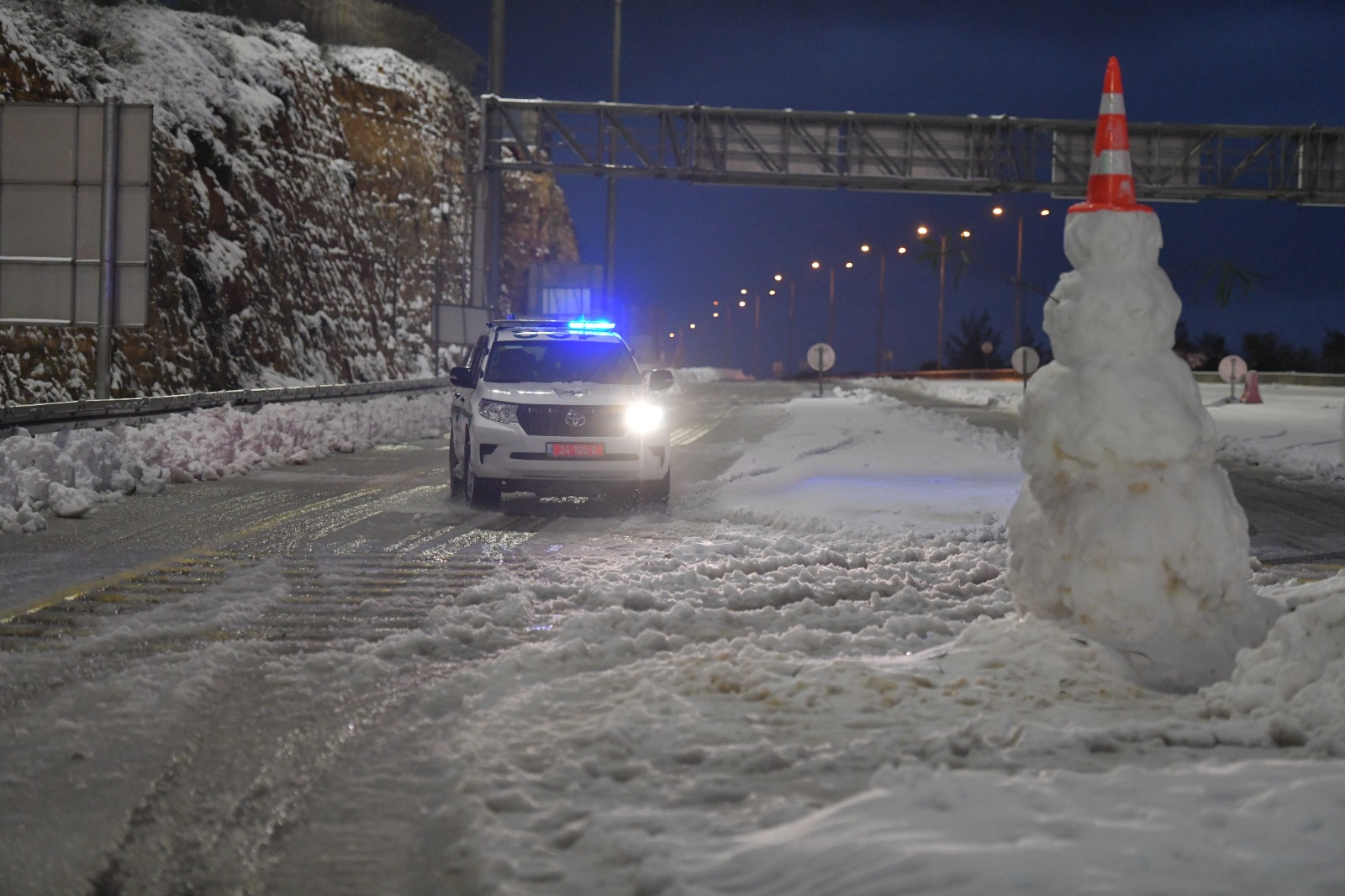
Snowman Cone

== See also ==
- Weather of 2022
