= Felicia =

Female given name

- Gender: Female

Origin
- Origin: Latin
- Meaning: Happiness

Other names
- Short forms: Licia, Fish, Lica, Elle, Fliss, Felly, Lish, Fia, Ellie, Flea, Feli
- Related names: Felix, Felicity, Félicie

The name Felicia derives from the Latin adjective felix, meaning "happy, lucky", though in the neuter plural form felicia it literally means "happy things" and often occurred in the phrase tempora felicia, "happy times". The sense of it as a feminine personal name appeared in post-Classical use and is of uncertain origin. It is associated with saints, poets, astronomical objects, plant genera, fictional characters, and animals, especially cats.

== Cultural associations ==
The name has been in regular use and was particularly popular with Spanish speakers in the United States in the late 1980s and early 1990s. It remained among the 1,000 most popular names for American girls until 2005 but has since declined in use. The name was among the top 10 most popular names for girls in Sweden in the 1990s and remained among the top 100 names for Swedish girls until 2022.

The name is associated in American English with “Bye, Felicia”, an informal phrase and internet meme intended as a dismissive send-off, wherein a person or idea is rendered so unimportant his or her name is reduced to "Felicia." The phrase or meme is used to mock a person who causes annoyance.

== People ==
- Felicia of Sicily (fl. 1097), queen of Hungary
- Felicia of Roucy (d. 1123), queen of Aragon and Navarre
- Felicia Abban (1936/1937–2024), Ghanaian photographer
- Felicia Nimue Ackerman (born 1947), American Brown University Philosophy professor, monthly op-ed columnist, poet and author
- Felicia C. Adams (born 1960), American attorney
- Felicia Adeyoyin (1938–2021), Nigerian academic
- Felicia Adjei (born 1974), Ghanaian politician
- Felicia Afrăsiloaie (born 1954), Romanian rower
- Felicia Atkins, Australian model
- Felicia Ballanger (born 1971), French cyclist
- Felicia Barton (born 1982), an American semifinalist on the eighth season of American Idol
- Felicia Minei Behr, American TV producer
- Felicia Montealegre Bernstein (1922–1978), American actress
- Felicia Bond (born 1954), American writer and illustrator, illustrator of If You Give a Mouse a Cookie
- Felicia Brabec (born c. 1974), American politician and clinical psychologist
- Felicia Brandström (born 1987), Swedish singer and one of the contestants in Swedish Idol 2006
- Felicia Brown-Edwards (born 1993), American sprinter
- Felicia Browne (1904–1936), British artist
- Felicia F. Campbell (1931–2020), American academic
- Felicia Candelario (born 1961), Dominican Republic sprinter
- Felicia Chateloin (born 1949), Cuban architect, educator
- Felicia Chester (born 1988), American basketball player
- Felicia Chin (born 1984), Singaporean actress
- Felicia Buttz Clark (1862–1931), American writer
- Felicia Collins (born 1964), American vocalist and guitarist
- Felicia Cornaro (died 1111), Venetian dogaressa and de facto politician
- Felicia Cosman, American orthopedic surgeon
- Felicia Cummings (born 1968), Trinidadian cricketer
- Felicia Day (born 1979), American actress
- Felicia Donceanu (1931–2022), Romanian painter, sculptor, and composer
- Felicia Edem Attipoe, Ghanaian first female aircraft marshaller
- Felicia Elizondo (1946–2021), American transgender activist
- Felicia Eriksson (born 2001), Swedish singer
- Felicia Eze (1974–2012), Nigerian footballer
- Felicia Farr (born 1932), American actress, widow of Jack Lemmon
- Felicia Ferrone, American industrial and furniture designer
- Felicia Filip (born 1959), Romanian operatic soprano
- Felícia Fuster (1921–2012), Spanish painter and poet
- Felicia Garza (born 1941), Mexican-American songwriter, singer and actress
- Felicia Greer (born 1970), Canadian cyclist
- Felicia Gressitt Bock (1916–2011), American scholar, translator
- Felicia Hano (born 1998), American artistic gymnast
- Felicia Browne Hemans (1793–1835), English poet
- Felicia D. Henderson (born 1961), American screenwriter
- Felicia Hill-Briggs, American behavioral and social scientist
- Felicia Hofner, German-American YouTuber
- Felicia Hutnick, American tennis player
- Felicia Hwang Yi Xin (born 1992), Indonesian model and actress
- Felicia Jacobs, South African rugby player
- Felicia Keesing, American ecologist
- Felicia Kentridge (1930–2015), South African lawyer and activist
- Felicia Knaul, British-Canadian health economist
- Felicia Kornbluh (born 1966), American scholar and writer
- Felicia Kwaku, Nigerian-British nurse
- Felicia Laberer (born 2001), German paracanoeist
- Felicia Lamport (1916–1999), American poet and satirist
- Felicia Langer (1930–2018), German-Israeli attorney and activist
- Felicia Lee (born 1992), American swimmer
- Felícia Leirner (1904–1996), Polish-born Brazilian sculptor
- Felicia Hardison Londré (born 1941), American theatrical historian
- Felicia Mabuza-Suttle (born 1950), South African talk show hostess
- Felicia Malipiero, Dogaressa of Venice
- Felicia Mason (born 1962), African-American novelist and journalist
- Felicia Mercado (born 1959), Mexican actress, singer and TV hostess
- Felicia Meyer (1912–1978), American painter
- Felicia Michaels (born 1963), American stand-up comedian
- Felicia Middlebrooks (born 1957), American radio news broadcaster
- Felicia "Fe" Montes, American artist
- Felicia Moore, American politician
- Felicia Nossig (1855–1939), Polish sociologist
- Felicia Oh (born 1967), American martial artist
- Felicia Ospitaletche (born 1953), Uruguayan sprinter
- Felicia Pearson (born 1980), American actress from The Wire
- Felicia Pratto (born 1961), American social psychologist
- Felicia Pride, American author, educator and entrepreneur
- Felicia Rabourn (born 1990), American politician
- Felicia Ragland (born 1980), American basketball player
- Felicia Raschiatore (born 1961), American tennis player
- Felicia Rice, American book artist
- Felicia Robinson, American politician and educator
- Felicia Rogic (born 1993), Swedish association football player
- Felicia Sanders (1921–1975), American popular music singer
- Felicia Rudolphina Scatcherd (1862–1927), English journalist and spiritualist
- Felicia Schroeder, American soccer player
- Felicia Schröder (born 2007), Swedish soccer player
- Felicia Skene (1821–1899), Scottish writer, philanthropist and prison reformer
- Felicia Sonmez, American journalist
- Felicia Sorel (1903–1972), American dancer, choreographer
- Felicia Spencer (born 1990), Canadian mixed martial arts fighter
- Felicia Stancil (born 1995), American bicycle racer
- Felicia Stewart (1943–2006), American doctor
- Felicia Tang (1977–2009), American actress and model
- Felicia Taylor (1964–2023), American journalist
- Félicia Thierret, French actress
- Felicia Țilea-Moldovan (born 1967), Romanian javelin thrower
- Felicia Tuczek, German composer and pianist
- Felicia Walters (born 1992), Trinidadian cricketer
- Felicia Weathers (born 1937), American soprano in opera and concert
- Felicia Wiedermann, German field hockey player
- Felicia Yap, Malaysian author
- Felicia Zhang (born 1993), American pair skater
- Felicia Zimmermann (born 1975), American fencer

== Fictional characters ==
- Felicia, a catgirl in the Capcom video game series Darkstalkers
- Felicia Forrester, a character in the American soap opera The Bold and the Beautiful
- Felicia Hardy, a character appearing in comic books published by Marvel Comics

== Animals ==
- Felicia, a trained ferret at Fermilab
