= Faith (given name) =

Feminine given name

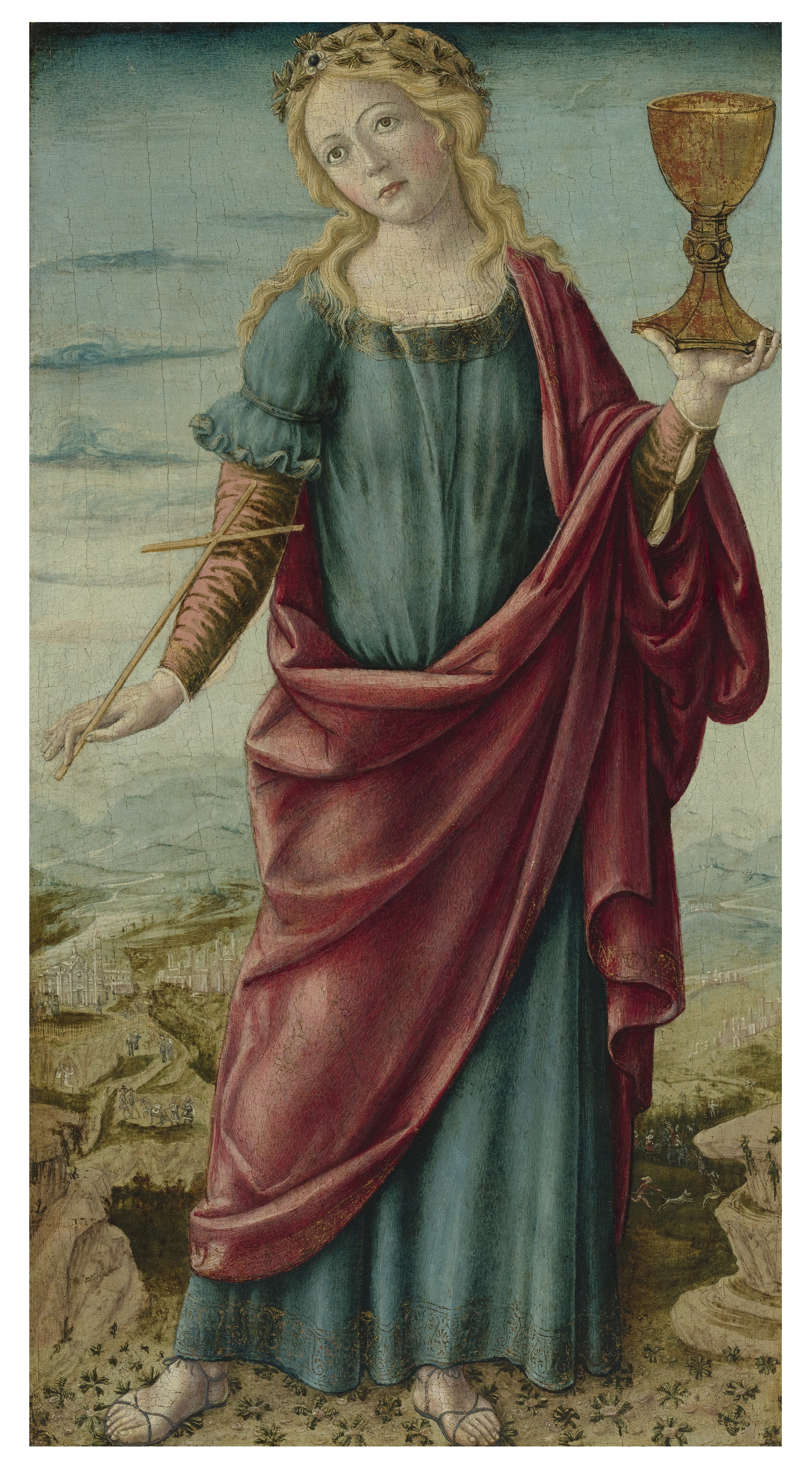
- "Faith" by Andrea di Niccolo.
- Gender: female

Origin
- Origin: English
- Meaning: faith
- Region of origin: English-speaking countries

Other names
- Related names: Faithe, Fay, Faye, Fidelia, Fides, Pistis, Vera.

Faith is an English feminine given name derived from the word faith. It became popularized when the Puritans began using it as a virtue name during the 17th century. Puritans also used Faith as part of longer phrase names, such as Be-faithful, Faithful, Faith-my-joy, and Fight-the-good-fight-of-faith.

The name is also the usual English translation of the Greek name of Saint Faith, an early Christian child martyr who was tortured to death along with her sisters Hope and Charity. She is known as Pistis in Greek and Fides in Church Latin and her name is translated differently in other languages.

Faith, Hope and Charity, the three theological virtues, are names traditionally given to triplet girls, just as Faith and Hope remain common names for twin girls. There were 40 sets of twins named Faith and Hope born in the United States in 2009, the second most common name combination for twin girls. In 2011, there were 33 sets of twin girls named Faith and Hope in the United States, the fourth most common name combination for twins. One example were the American triplets Faith, Hope and Charity Cardwell, who were born in 1899 in Texas and were recognized in 1994 by the Guinness Book of World Records as the world's longest lived triplets.

Faith has been a consistently popular name for girls in the United States, ranking among the top 1,000 names since 1880 and the top 500 names since 1921. It reached peak popularity in the United States in 2002, when it was the 48th most popular name for American girls. It ranked among the top 100 names in the United States between 1999 and 2016. Faith has also been a well-used name elsewhere in the Anglosphere, including Canada, New Zealand, and the United Kingdom. It has also been well used in the Netherlands.

Usage of the name increased during the 1990s due to popular culture influences such as the fame of the American country western singer Faith Hill and the debut of the character Faith Lehane on the 1997-2003 American television series Buffy the Vampire Slayer.

Other cultures also give names in reference to religious faith. The name Iman is used by Muslims for both boys and girls in reference to faith in Islam.

== Women ==
- Faith Gines (2015-present) young child prodigy
- Faith Andrews (1896–1990), American scholar of the Shakers
- Faith Anne (born 1994), Filipina singer
- Faith Avis (1924–2010), Canadian journalist, writer, and naturalist
- Faith Baldwin (1893–1978), American writer of romance novels
- Faith Bandler (1918–2015), Australian civil rights activist of South Sea islander heritage
- Tamara Faith Berger, Canadian author and novelist
- Faith Bikani, South African politician
- Faith Brook (1922–2012), English actress
- Faith Bromberg (1919–1990), American painter and feminist
- Faith Brown (born 1944), British actress and impressionist
- Faith Bruyning (born 1988), Dutch jurist and politician
- Faith Burrows (1904–1997), American cartoonist
- Faith Celli (1888–1942), English actress
- Faith Chemutai (born 1980), Kenyan long distance runner
- Faith Coloccia, American artist and musician
- Faith Dane (1923–2020), American entertainer
- Faith Daniels (born 1957), American television news anchor, reporter, and talk show host
- Faith Ann Del Rosario Herminigildo (born 1994), Filipina singer, and television host known as Faith Anne
- Faith Dillon (born 2002), American taekwondo athlete
- Faith Domergue (c. 1924–1999), American actress
- Faith Ellen, Canadian academic
- Faith Esham (born 1948), American operatic soprano
- Faith Evans (born 1973), American R&B singer
- Faith Ford (born 1964), American actress
- Faith Gasa (1945–2005), South African politician
- Faith Gibson, British nurse
- Faith Gillezeau (born 1998), Trinidadian pharmacist, athlete, model and beauty pageant titleholder
- Faith Gitau, Kenyan politician
- Faith Goldy (born 1989), Canadian political commentator and reporter
- Faith Lanman Gorrell (1881–1966), American home economist and educator
- Faith Hedgepeth (1992–2012), American murder victim
- Faithe Herman, American actress
- Faith Erin Hicks, Canadian cartoonist and animator
- Faith Hill (born 1967), American country and pop singer
- Faith Holsaert (born 1943), American educator and activist during the civil rights movement
- Faith Hubley (1924–2001), American animator
- Faith Jefferies (born 1999), American wrestler, taekwondo practitioner, and musician known as Nikkita Lyons
- Faith Hunter, American author and blogger
- Faith Huntington (1742–1775), Colonial American woman who lived during the American Revolutionary War
- Faith Idehen (born 1973), Nigerian sprinter
- Faith Jaques (1923–1997), British illustrator
- Faith Jenkins (born 1977), American attorney, legal commentator and media personality
- Faith Kakembo (born 1985), Swedish-Ugandan singer and nurse anesthetist
- Faith Kates (born 1957), American model agent and talent agent.
- Faith Keza, Rwandan business executive
- Faith Kipyegon (born 1994), Kenyan middle- and long-distance runner
- Faith Kunihira Philo, Ugandan politician
- Faith Leyba (born 2005), American soccer player
- Faith McNulty (1918–2005), American non-fiction author
- Faith Michael (born 1987), Nigerian footballer
- Faith Minton, American tactress and stuntwoman
- Lady Mary Faith Montagu (1911–1983), British aristocrat
- Faith Nakut, Ugandan politician
- Faith Nathan (born 2000), Australian rugby union player
- Faith Ng (born 1987), Singaporean playwright
- Faith Nisperos (born 2000), Filipina volleyball player
- Faith Nketsi (born 1994), South African influencer, model and media personality
- Faith Nolan (born 1957), Canadian social activist, folk and jazz singer-songwriter and guitarist
- Faith Okwose (born 2006), Nigerian sprinter
- Faith Popcorn (born 1947), American futurist
- Faith Rich (1909–1990), American activist and educator
- Faith Ringgold (1930–2024), American painter, author, sculptor, performance artist, and intersectional activist
- Faith Rivera, American singer-songwriter
- Faith Salie (born 1971), American journalist, writer, actress, comedian, television, radio, and podcast host
- Faith Da Silva (born 2001), Filipina actress
- Faith Spotted Eagle (born 1948), American and Yankton Sioux activist and politician
- Faith Thomas (1933–2023), Australian cricketer and hockey player
- Faith Torrez (born 2003), American artistic gymnast
- Faith Van Duin (born 1986), New Zealand mixed martial artist
- Faith Vilas, American planetary scientist
- Cora Faith Walker (1984–2022), American politician
- Faith Susan "Alberta" Watson (1955–2015), Canadian film and television actress
- Faith Webber (born 2002), American soccer player
- Faith Whittlesey (1939–2018), American politician, diplomat, lawyer, and writer
- Faith Wilding (born 1943), Paraguayan American artist
- Faith Winter (1980–2025), American politician
- Faith Yang (born 1974), Taiwanese singer and model
- Faith B. Yisrael (born c. 1978), Tobagonian public health official and politician

== Fiction ==
- Faith, supporting character in Summerland
- Faith Lehane, a character in Buffy the Vampire Slayer

== Stage name ==
- Faith Bacon, stage name of American burlesque dancer and actress Frances Bacon (1910–1956)
