= Felicity (given name) =

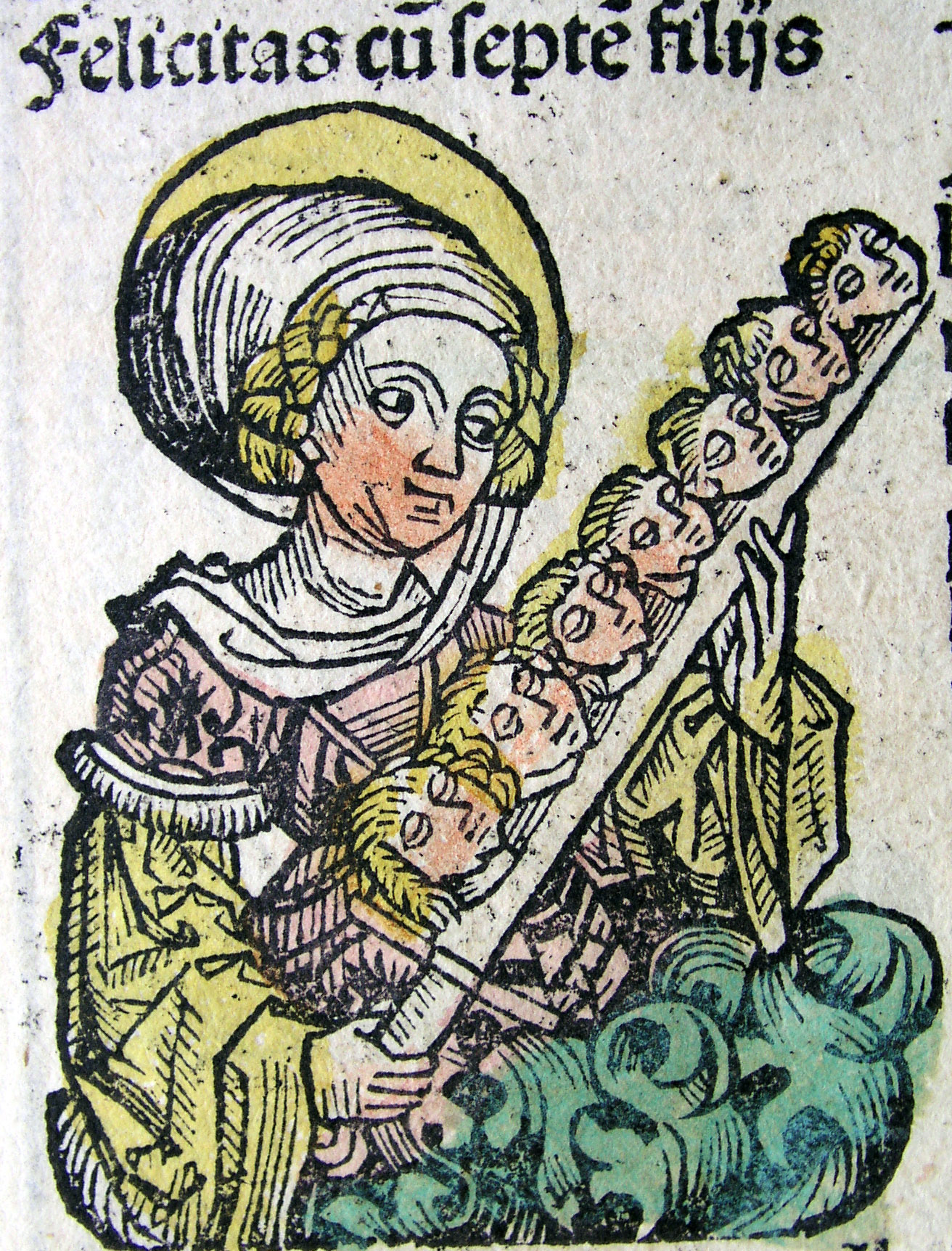
- Saint Felicity of Rome, a 2nd-century saint, inspired use of the name Felicity.
- Gender: Feminine

Origin
- Origin: Latin and English
- Meaning: "happiness, good luck"

Other names
- Nicknames: Fee, Flick, Flicka, Fliss, Flissa, Flossie, Flossy, Liccy, Liss, Lissa, Lissie, Lissy
- Related names: Felice, Felicia, Feliciana, Félicie, Félicienne, Felix, Felicitas

Felicity is a feminine given name of English origin meaning "happiness". It is derived from the Latin word felicitas meaning "luck, good fortune". It is also used as a form of the Latin name Felicitas, taken from the name of the Ancient Roman goddess Fortuna. It was also the name of Saint Felicity of Rome, a 2nd-century saint venerated by the Roman Catholic Church. The Latin Felicia, a related name, is a feminine form of the name Felix, which is derived from an Ancient Roman cognomen meaning "lucky," or "successful." Traditional English diminutives include Fee, Flick, Flicka, Fliss, Flissy, Flossie, Flossy, Liccy, Liss, Lissa, Lissie, and Lissy, among others.

== Usage ==
Prior to the Victorian era, Felicia and its vernacular form Felice were the most commonly used forms of the name in English-speaking countries. Some forms of the name such as Philicia became associated with the etymologically unrelated name Phyllis. The name Felicity was used by English Puritans from the late 16th century but was less commonly used by them than other virtue names. The name Felicity has been in regular use in the United Kingdom since the late 19th century and, as of the 2020s, remained among the top 200 names in use for British girls.

The name was also among the top 100 names for girls born in Australia at different times from the mid-1970s to early 1980s. Felicity has also been in regular use in New Zealand.

Felicity also has been in occasional use in North America since the Colonial era, though Felice and Felicia and variations of the name in other languages were much more common. Felicity first ranked among the top 1,000 names for newborn girls in the United States in 1998, the year the American television show Felicity debuted. Felicity was the 390th most popular name for American girls in 1999, rising from 818th place the previous year. The name has also been among the 1,000 most popular names in use for girls in Canada since the late 1990s. Usage of the name has also been influenced by other media. Felicity Merriman is a red-headed American Colonial doll produced by the American Girl company. The doll, which has a tie-in book series, movies, and a number of accessories, was introduced in the United States in 1991. American actress Felicity Huffman has also increased awareness of the name. The character Felicity Smoak was introduced on the American television series Arrow in 2012.

== In other languages ==
- Felicitat (Catalan)
- Felicia, Feliciënne (Dutch)
- Félicie, Félicienne, Félicité, Félicitée (French)
- Felicie, Felicitas, Felize, Felizitas, Zita (German)
- Felícia, Feliciána, Felicitász, Zita (Hungarian)
- Felicia, Felisha, Felisya, Felisa, Felice, Felisia, Felishia (Indonesian)
- Felicia, Feliciana, Felicita (Italian)
- Felicja, Felicyta, Zyta (Polish)
- Felícia, Felicidade (Portuguese)
- Felicia (Romanian)
- Felicia, Feliciana, Felicidad, Felicitas, Felistas, Felixa, Felixia, Felixita (Spanish)
- Felicia (Swedish)

== Women ==
- Felicity of Rome, 2nd-century Christian martyr and saint
- Saint Felicity, early 3rd-century co-martyr of Saint Perpetua
- Felicity Abbott, New Zealand production designer
- Felicity Abram (born 1986), Australian triathlete
- Felicity Ama Agyemang (born 1977), Ghanaian actress, TV show hostess, and music composer also known as Nana Ama McBrown
- Felicity Askew (1894-?), British artist
- Felicity Aston (born 1977), British adventurer and climate scientist, first person to ski across Antarctica on her own power
- Felicity Barr (born 1970), English broadcast journalist
- Felicity Brown (born 1977), English artist and designer
- Felicity Bryan (1945–2020), British literary agent
- Felicity Buchan (born 1970), British politician and former banker
- Felicity Campbell (1909-?), British painter and illustrator
- Felicity Campbell (born 1974), Australian short track speed skater and Olympian
- Felicity Charlton (1913–2009), British artist
- Felicity Cockram, Australian film producer
- Felicity "Flick" Colby (1946–2011), American dancer
- Felicity Colman, British academic
- Felicity Dahl (born 1938), British film producer
- Felicity Dean (born 1959), British actress
- Felicity Dowker (born 1980), Australian fiction writer, primarily in the horror genre
- Felicity Evans, Welsh journalist and broadcaster
- Felicity Finch (born 1955), British actress
- Felicity Gallup (born 1969), British badminton player
- Felicity Galvez (born 1985), Australian swimmer and two-time Olympic champion
- Felicity Gerry, Australian barrister, academic, and media commentator
- Felicity “Fliss” Gibbons (born 1994), English footballer
- Felicity Goodey (born 1949), British journalist
- Felicity Goodyear-Smith (born 1952), a medical doctor, academic, and public health advocate from New Zealand
- Felicity Green (1926–2026), British fashion journalist and newspaper executive
- Felicity Hampel (born 1955), Australian human rights lawyer and judge
- Felicity Heal (born 1945), British historian and academic
- Felicity Hill (1915–2019), British Royal Air Force officer
- Felicity Hunter (born c. 1983), Australian singer-songwriter
- Felicity Huffman (born 1962), American actress
- Felicity Johnson (born 1971), Australian Paralympic tandem cyclist
- Felicity Johnson (born 1987), English professional golfer
- Felicity Jones (born 1983), English actress
- Felicity Kendal (born 1946), English actress
- Felicity LaFortune (born 1954), American actress
- Felicity Landon, British freelance journalist
- Felicity Lane-Fox, Baroness Lane-Fox (1918–1988), British politician and champion of disability issues
- Felicity Leydon-Davis (born 1994), New Zealand cricketer
- Felicity Lott (1947–2026), English soprano
- Felicity Mason (born 1976), Australian actress, writer, and visual artist
- Felicity McCall, Irish journalist, writer and broadcaster
- Felicity Milovanovich (born 1992), New Zealand actress
- Felicity Montagu (born 1960), English actress
- Felicity Nussbaum (born 1944), American academic
- Felicity Okpete Ovai (born 1961), commissioner of the Rivers State Ministry of Works
- Felicity Palmer (born 1944), English mezzo-soprano and music professor
- Felicity Passon (born 1999), Seychellois swimmer and Olympian
- Felicity Peake (1913–2002), founding director of the UK's Women's Royal Air Force
- Felicity Pickard (born 1994), British para table tennis player
- Felicity Plunkett, Australian poet, literary critic, editor and academic
- Felicity Price, Australian actress and screenwriter
- Felicity Pulman (born 1945), Rhodesian born Australian author
- Felicity "Flick" Rea (1938–2026), English Liberal Democrat politician
- Felicity Riddy (born 1940), New Zealand born academic, author and specialist in late-medieval English and Scottish literature.
- Felicity Shaw (1916–1989), British writer
- Felicity Sheedy-Ryan (born 1985), Australian triathlete
- Felicity Tree (1894–1978), English baronetess and high society figure
- Felicity Underhill, New Zealand energy specialist
- Felicity Urquhart (born 1976), Australian country music singer-songwriter
- Felicity Wallace, New Zealand architect
- Felicity Ward (born 1980), Australian comedian
- Felicity Wardlaw (born 1977), Australian road cyclist
- Felicity Waterman (born 1964), English actress
- Felicity White (born 2000), Australian group rhythmic gymnast and Olympian
- Felecity Willis (born 1978), American basketball referee and former player
- Felicity Wren, British actress

== Fictional characters ==
- Felicity (comics), a member of DC Comics' Omega Men, now known as Nebula
- Felicity, a magical cat and the main character in Rainbow Butterfly Unicorn Kitty.
- Felicity, in The Dreamland Chronicles fantasy webcomic and comic book series
- Felicity, in 2009 comedy film The Boat That Rocked
- Felicity, in the novel Felidae
- Felicity Fieldmouse, the older sister of Mickey Mouse
- Felicity Hardy, a Marvel Comics character, also known as the third Scarlet Spider
- Felicity King, in the television series Road to Avonlea, played by Gema Zamprogna
- Felicity Lemon, secretary to Hercule Poirot, fictional Belgian detective created by Dame Agatha Christie
- Felicity Merriman, from the American Girl series of dolls and books
- Felicity Montague, the main character in the novel The Lady's Guide to Petticoats and Piracy by Mackenzi Lee
- Felicity Parham, a background character in The Amazing World of Gumball.
- Felicity Porter, the main character in the television series Felicity, played by Keri Russell
- Felicity Rivers, in Enid Blyton's book series Malory Towers
- Felicity "Flick" Scully, in the Australian soap opera Neighbours
- Felicity Shagwell, from the movie Austin Powers: The Spy Who Shagged Me, played by Heather Graham
- Felicity Smoak, a DC Comics character
  - Felicity Smoak, a character from the television series Arrow, based on DC Comics, played by Emily Bett Rickards
- Felicity Wishes, the main character in the book series Felicity Wishes
- Felicity Worthington, in Libba Bray's novel A Great and Terrible Beauty, as well as its two sequels
- Mrs. Felicity Fox (Note: originally just known by the name Mrs Fox (without a full stop at the end of the honorific) in the novel; named Mrs. Felicity Fox (with full stop), commonly shortened to Mrs. Fox, in the film) from Roald Dahl's novel Fantastic Mr Fox and its film adaptation of the same name by Wes Anderson
