= SnipSnap (disambiguation) =

SnipSnap is an app that will let you receive free coupons.

SnipSnap may also refer to:

- Snip-Snap-Snorum, a matching card game
- Snipp, Snapp, Snurr, fictional book characters
- Snip and Snap, an animated 1960 British television show
