= Virtue name =

Personal name expressing a virtue

Virtue names — also known as hortatory names and grace names — are used as personal names in a number of cultures. They express virtues that the parents wish their child to embody or be associated with. In the English-speaking world, beginning in the 16th century, the Puritans commonly expressed their values through creative names, many in the form of virtue names such as Grace, Felicity, Faith or Hope. These names have entered the standard British and American usage, without the religious connection.

Some Puritan virtue names were compound imperatives, such as "Search-the-scriptures" or "Praise-God". An example of the use of "Praise-God" as a name is Praise-God Barebone, whose son Nicholas may have been given the name If-Jesus-Christ-had-not-died-for-thee-thou-hadst-been-damned. In Britain, such Puritan virtue names were particularly common in Kent, Sussex and Northamptonshire. Virtue names were more commonly given to girls than boys, though not exclusively.

Virtue names, such as Iman, can also be found in the Islamic world.

Names meant to convey virtues or desirable traits are also used in Nigeria. Examples include the former president Goodluck Jonathan and his wife Patience Jonathan.

In the United States in 2011, Faith and Hope was the fourth most common pairing of names for twins. Sixth was Heaven and Nevaeh ('Heaven' spelled backwards). Faith, Hope and Charity (the three theological virtues) has been used for triplets, including the Cardwell triplets, who were Guinness-recognised as the oldest triplets ever.

Use of the virtue name Chastity was revived after the birth of Cher and Sonny Bono's son Chaz Bono.

There are also names that derive from positive attributes but which have separated from those words over time, including in spelling. For example, Ernest derives from the same root as 'earnest', hence the pun in The Importance of Being Earnest, whose main character assumes that name. Ernest was a popular name around the turn of the 20th century.

== Examples ==
- Blythe
- Charity
- Chastity
- Constance
- Dilys
- Ernest
- Faith
- Felicity
- Felix
- Grace
- Harmony
- Honor
- Hope
- Joy
- Liberty
- Mercy
- Modesty
- Patience
- Prudence
- Sage
- Serenity
- Temperance
- Verity
