= Felicita (given name) =

Felicita is an Italian female given name. The English counterpart is Felicity. Notable people with the name include:

- Felicita Frai (1909–2010), Italian painter
- Felicita Casella (c. 1820 – after 1865), French-born Italian singer and composer
- Felicita Kalinšek (1865–1937), Slovenian nun
- Felicita Maria di Boemondo (died after 1172), Princess of Antioch and the Dogaressa of Venice
- Felicita Pauļuka (1925–2014), Latvian painter
- Felicita Sartori (1713–1782), Italian painter and pastellist
- Felicita Vestvali (1831–1880), German opera singer and actress
