= Félicie (given name) =

Félicie is a feminine given name of French origin.

== People with the given name ==
- Félicie Affolter (1926–2024), Swiss psychologist
- Félicie Albert, French-born American physicist
- Félicie d'Ayzac (1801–1881), French poet and art historian
- Félicie de Fauveau (1801–1886), French sculptor
- Félicie Erpelding-Schlesser (1883–1970), Luxembourgish municipal politician
- Félicie Gérard (born 1974), French politician
- Felicie Howell, American painter
- Felicie Hüni-Mihacsek (1891–1976), Hungarian operatic soprano
- Félicie Schneider (1831–1888), French painter

== Places ==
- Félicie Point

== See also ==
- Felicity (given name)
- Felicia
- Félicie aussi, 1939 song
- Mademoiselle Félicie
