= Feliksas =

- Gender: Male
- Language: Lithuanian
- Name day: 20 November

Origin
- Meaning: "lucky"
- Region of origin: Lithuania

Other names
- Derived: Latin
- Related names: Felix, Feliks

Feliksas is a Lithuanian male given name, which is derived from the Latin name Felix, meaning "lucky".

- Feliksas Daukantas (1915–1995), Lithuanian artist
- Feliksas Jakubauskas (born 1949), Lithuanian textile artist
- Feliksas Kriaučiūnas (1911–1977), Lithuanian basketball player and coach
- Feliksas Vaitkus (1907–1956), American pilot
