= Zita (name) =

Zitta is a female given name.

The name may originate from the Italian word zitta meaning young girl or from the Hungarian pet name of Felicita, from Latin Felicia. In Basque, the word means saint. In Greek, the word means' the hunter'.

== Name days ==
- Czech: 19 September
- Latvian: 11 August
- Slovak: 2 April
- Catholic: 27 April
- Hungary: 27 April
- Lithuanian: 27 April

== People with the name ==
- Saint Zita (c. 1212–1272), Italian saint and patron saint of maids
- Zita of Bourbon-Parma (1892–1989), Princess of Parma, last Empress-Consort of Austria-Hungary
- Zita Cobb, Canadian businesswoman
- Zita (Hittite prince), Hittite prince mentioned in one of the 14th century BC Amarna letters
- Zita Ajkler (born 1975), Hungarian retired long jumper, triple jumper, heptathlete and hurdler
- Zita Funkenhauser
- Zita Görög (born 1979), Hungarian actress and model
- Zyta Gilowska (1949–2016), Polish economist and politician
- Zita Gurmai (born 1965), Hungarian politician and Member of the European Parliament
- Zita Johann (1904–1993), Hungarian-born Broadway and film actress
- Zita Kabátová (1913–2012), Czech actress
- Zita Loseva (born 1954), Lithuanian politician and public activist
- Zita Okaikoi, Ghanaian politician
- Zita Nelson, Spanish-Argentine soprano
- Zita Perczel (1918–1996), Hungarian actress
- Zita Pleštinská (born 1961), Slovak politician and Member of the European Parliament
- Zita Sattar (born 1975), English actress
- Zita Martins (born 1979), Portuguese astrobiologist
- Zita Seabra (born 1949), Portuguese politician
- Zita Stead (1904–1986), medical illustrator, one of the founders of the Medical Artists Association of Great Britain.
- Zita Szabó (born 1975), Hungarian retired triathlete
- Zita Szeleczky (1915–1999), Hungarian actress
- Zita Szucsánszki (born 1987), Hungarian handball player
- Zita Urbonaitė (1973–2008), Lithuanian road cyclist
- Zita Leeson Weinshienk (1935–2022), American judge

== Fictional characters ==
- Zita Flores, on the American children's animated TV show Kim Possible
- Zita the Spacegirl, the titular main character in a series of graphic novels by Ben Hatke
- Zita, a secondary character from the animated show Invader Zim.
