= Pauļuks =

Pauļuks, feminine: Pauļuka is a Latvian surname. Notable people with the surname include:

- Felicita Pauļuka (1925–2014), Latvian artist
- Jānis Pauļuks, Prime Minister of Latvia
