= Chastity (given name) =

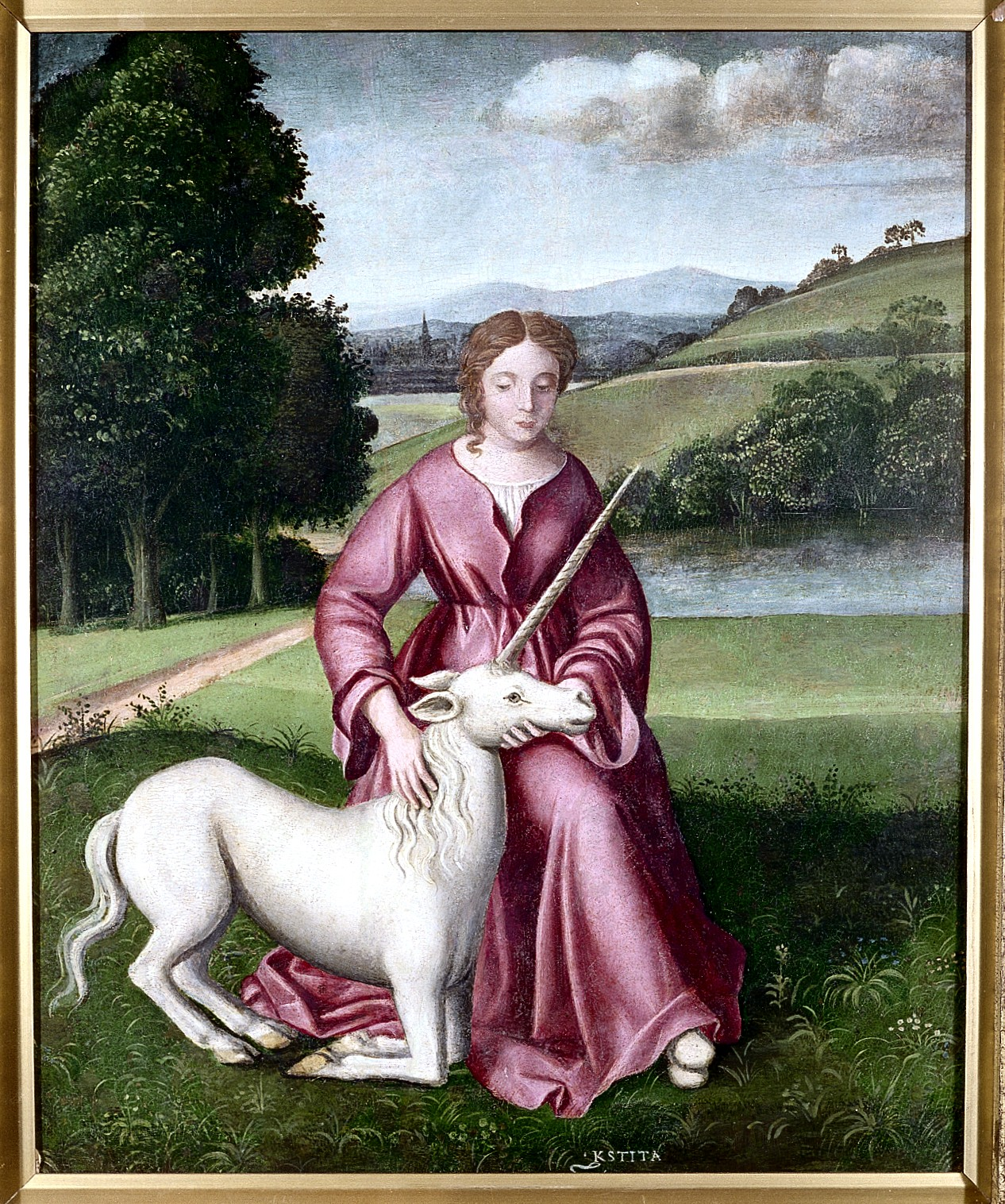
- Chastity, a painting by a follower of Timoteo Viti, depicting a maiden with a unicorn, both traditional symbols of chastity.
- Gender: Feminine
- Language: English via Late Latin

Origin
- Meaning: Chastity

Other names
- Nicknames: Chas, Chaz
- Related names: Chasity

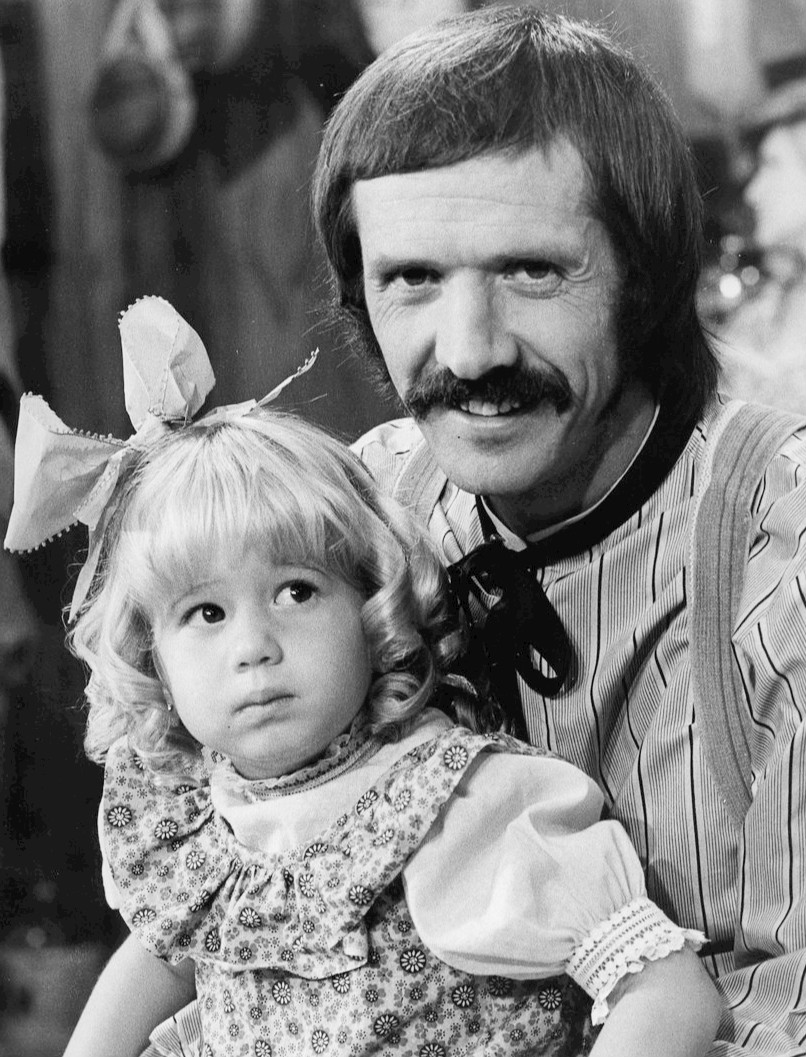
Sonny Bono and Chaz Bono, who was then called Chastity Sun Bono, in 1974.

Chastity is a feminine given name meaning chastity, referring to the virtue of exercising self-control over one's sexual behavior, which might mean practicing celibacy for a person who is unmarried, or monogamy for a person who is married. The name comes from the Late Latin word castitas. According to some sources, it was one of many virtue names in use by Puritans in the Colonial United States. However, other sources state that the name was not actually in use by the Puritans.

Other modern spelling variants and name variants in use include Chasidy, Chassidy, Chassiti, Chassity, Chastady, Chastidy, Chastitea, Chastitee, Chastitey, Chastiti, and Chastitie. Some other variations of the name in use in the United States during the 19th century were Chassie, Chasta, Chasteen, Chastin, Chastina, Chastine, and Chasty.

== Usage ==
The name increased in usage in the United States in the early 1970s after it was used by Sonny Bono and Cher for their child Chaz Bono, who was originally named Chastity Bono, in 1969. Chasity is a modern variant. Cher portrayed a character called Chastity in the 1969 film Chastity, released the same year Cher named her child.

Chastity was among the 1,000 most popular given names for girls in the United States between 1972 and 1993. It peaked in usage in 1974, when it was the 311th most popular name and used for 0.048 percent of all American girls born that year. Variant Chasity was among the 1,000 most popular names for American girls between 1972 and 2008. Both names remain in occasional use in the United States.

== People ==
- Chaz Bono, (born Chastity Sun Bono; born 1969), American writer, musician and actor
- Chastity Brown (born 1982), American singer-songwriter and musician
- Chastity Daniels (born 1978), American rapper who performs under the stage name La Chat
- Chastity Dotson (born 1986), American actress
- Chastity Reed (born 1989), American professional women's basketball player

== Stage name ==
- Chastity, the ring name of Denise Riffle, who performed as a valet in ECW and WCW
- Chastity Butterworth, a comedy character assumed by Gemma Whelan for various shows

== Fictional characters ==
- Chastity (character), a comic book character
- Chastity, a character played by Cher in the 1969 romantic drama film Chastity
- Chastity Barebone, a character in the movie Fantastic Beasts and Where to Find Them
- Chastity "Chas" Dingle, a character on the British soap opera Emmerdale
- Chastity Detroit, a character in the TimeSplitters video game trilogy
- Chastity Claire "C.C." Babcock, a character in the American TV sitcom The Nanny

== See also ==
- Cassidy (given name)
