= Kornbluh =

Kornbluh is the surname of the following people:

- Karen Kornbluh (born 1963), American diplomat and public figure
- Felicia Kornbluh (born 1966), American professor, writer, and feminist activist
- Peter Kornbluh (born 1956), American historian and Latin Americanist
- Rebecca Kornbluh, three-time winner of the United States Open (crosswords) (1984–86)
