= Felix (name) =

- Pronunciation: English: /ˈfiːlɪks/ FEE-liks; French: [feliks] Swedish: [ˈfěːlɪks] Polish: [ˈfɛliks] Spanish: [ˈfeliɣs] Portuguese: [ˈfɛliks] or [ˈfɛliʃ] Catalan: [ˈfɛliks]
- Gender: Male

Origin
- Origin: Latin
- Meaning: "lucky" or "successful"

Other names
- Related names: Felicity; Felicia

Felix is a masculine given name that originates from the Latin word felix [ˈfeːliːks] (genitive felicis [feːˈliːkɪs]), meaning "happy", "lucky", "fortunate", "successful", or "fruitful". Its original meaning was "fruit-bearing", in reference to fruitful trees, arbor felix. The feminine forms are Felicia or Felicity. The name was popularized by Roman emperors and early Christian saints.

In Roman mythology, Felix was one of four sons of the god Saturn and Roman mortal Entoria. The name was used as an agnomen, or nickname, by the Roman general Lucius Cornelius Sulla (138-78 BC) to denote his good fortune in war. It was also bestowed upon the Legio IV Flavia, a legion of the Imperial Roman army founded in 70 AD by the emperor Vespasian. It was used later as an imperial title, beginning with Commodus (161-192), who adopted it around 184 AD after military successes in Britain and Sarmatia. It would continue to be used by later emperors, including Aurelian (214-275).

In modern usage, Felix has maintained its popularity in various cultures, especially in English, German, and Scandinavian-speaking countries. In Romance languages such as French, Portuguese, and Spanish, the acute accent form "Félix" is commonly used. The Italian form of the name is "Felice", and its Polish and Serbian form is "Feliks".

Notable people with the name include:

== Romans ==
- Lucius Cornelius Sulla Felix (died 78 BC), Roman general and statesman
- Antonius Felix (died 60), procurator of Judea
- A part of many Roman emperors' titles, starting with Commodus
- Flavius Felix (died 430), Roman consul

== Late Antiquity and Middle Ages ==
=== Saints ===
"Saint Felix" may refer to:

- Felix of Heraclea, Christian martyr, date unknown
- Felix and Constantia (died 68)
- Felix, Fortunatus, and Achilleus (died c. 212)
- Felix of Nola (died c. 255)
- Felix and Regula (died 286)
- Felix of Thibiuca (died 303)
- Felix and Adauctus (died c. 303)
- Felix and Nabor (died c. 303)
- Felix of Girona (died 304)
- Felix of Como (died c. 390)
- Felix of Nîmes (4th century)
- Felix of Hadrumetum (died c. 434)
- Felix of Bilibio (5th century)
- Felix of Cornwall (5th or 6th century)
- Felix of Nantes (died 584)
- Felix of Burgundy (7th century)
- Felix the Hermit (9th century)
- Felix of Rhuys (died 1038)
- Felix of Valois (died 1212)

=== Popes ===
- Pope Felix I (269–274)
- Antipope Felix II (356–365)
- Pope Felix III (483–492)
- Pope Felix IV (526–530)

=== Bishops and priests ===
- Felix (bishop of Urgell) (died 818), Christian bishop and theologian
- Felix of Byzantium (fl. early 2nd century), bishop of Byzantium
- Felix of Ravenna (died 724), archbishop of Ravenna

== Early modern period (1500–1799) ==
- Felix of Cantalice (died 1587), Italian Capuchin friar
- Felix of Nicosia (died 1787), Italian Capuchin friar

== Modern times (1800–present) ==
=== Aliases ===
- Felix Dodds (born Michael Nicholas Dodds), British author, futurist and artist
- Felix (music producer), British producer and DJ
- Nicholas Felix (1804–1876), born Nicholas Wanostrocht, English cricketer
- The codename of Cold War spy Dieter Gerhardt
- The codename of (former) Securitate spy Dan Voiculescu
- The pen name of Tom Horan, Australian cricketer and cricket journalist

=== Given name ===
- Felix Adler (screenwriter) (1884–1963), American screenwriter
- Felix Adler (professor) (1851–1933), German-American professor
- Felix Agnus (1839–1925), French-born sculptor, newspaper publisher and soldier
- Felix Alderisio, American gangster
- Felix Andries Vening Meinesz (1887–1966), Dutch geophysicist and geodesist
- Félix Almagro (1907–1939), Spanish bullfighter
- Felix Anudike-Uzomah (born 2002), American football player
- Felix Arndt (1889–1918), American pianist and composer
- Félix Auger-Aliassime (born 2000), Canadian tennis player
- Felix Baldauf (born 1994), Norwegian Greco-Roman wrestler
- Félix Bañobre (born 1970), Spanish basketball coach
- Felix Batista, Cuban-American anti-kidnapping expert
- Felix Baumgartner (1969–2025), Austrian skydiver
- Felix Behrend (1911–1962), German Australian mathematician
- Felix Bloch (1905–1983), Swiss-American physicist and Nobel laureate
- Felix Browder (1927–2016), American mathematician
- Felix Brych (born 1975), German football referee
- Felix Bwalya (1970–1997), Zambian boxer
- Félix Caballero, Dominican priest
- Felix Calonder (1863–1952), Swiss politician
- Felix Cavaliere (born 1942), American musician
- Félix Chopin (1813–1892), French bronze designer
- Felix Chung (born 1963), Hong Kong politician
- Félix Darfour (died 1822), Haitian journalist
- Felix Dexter (1961–2013), Saint Kitts-born British actor, comedian and writer
- Felix Dias Bandaranaike (1930–1985), Sri Lankan lawyer and politician
- Felix Reginald Dias Bandaranaike I (1861–1947), Ceylonese judge and lawyer
- Felix Reginald Dias Bandaranaike II (1891–1951), Ceylonese judge and lawyer
- Felix Maria Diogg (1762–1834), Swiss painter
- Felix Dzerzhinsky (1877–1926), Soviet revolutionary and politician
- Felix Ehrlich (1877–1942), German chemist and biochemist
- Felix Eypeltauer (born 1992), Austrian politician
- Félix Faure (1841–1899), French politician
- Félix Fénéon (1861–1944), French art critic and anarchist
- Félix Fermín (born 1963), Dominican professional baseball shortstop
- Félix Omar Fernández (born 1976), Puerto Rican track and field athlete
- Felix Francis (born 1953), British crime writer
- Felix Frankfurter (1882–1965), Austrian-born American jurist
- Felix Friberg (born 2005), Finnish footballer
- Felix Gelt, Canadian association football player
- Felix N. Gerson (1862–1945), American author and newspaper editor
- Félix González-Torres (1957–1996), Cuban-born American artist
- Félix Guattari (1930–1992), French psychoanalyst, political philosopher, semiotician, social activist, and screenwriter
- Felix Hamrin (1875–1937), Swedish politician
- Felix Hanemann (born 1953), American singer and musician
- Felix Hausdorff (1868–1942), German mathematician
- Felix Herkens (born 1995), German politician
- Félix Hernández (born 1986), Venezuelan baseball pitcher
- Félix José Hernández (born 1972), Venezuelan football player
- Felix Hoffmann (1868–1946), German chemist
- Felix Hoffmann (basketball) (born 1989), German basketball player
- Felix Holtmann (born 1944), Canadian politician
- Félix Houphouët-Boigny (1905–1993), Ivorian politician and physician
- Felix Jaehn (born 1994), German DJ and record producer
- Felix Jones (born 1987), American football player
- Felix Jones (rugby union) (born 1987), Irish rugby union coach
- Felix Kaspar (1915–2003), Austrian figure skater
- Felix Klein (1849–1925), German mathematician
- Felix Kjellberg (born 1989), Swedish YouTuber
- Felix Kroos (born 1991), German football player
- Felix LaBauve (1809–1879), French-born American politician
- Felix Landau (1910–1983), Austrian SS Hauptscharführer
- Felix Latzke, Austrian football former player and manager
- Félix Lebrun (born 2006), French table tennis player
- Félix Leclerc (1914–1988), French-Canadian singer-songwriter and political activist
- Felix (rapper) (Felix Yongbok Lee, 2000), Australian rapper, member of boyband Stray Kids
- Felix Lehtinen (born 2003), Finnish footballer
- Félix Lengyel (born 1995), Canadian online streamer
- Felix A. Levy (1884–1963), American rabbi
- Felix von Luckner (1881–1966), German nobleman and navy officer
- Felix Luk (born 1994), Hong Kong professional footballer
- Felix Lützkendorf (1906–1990), German screenwriter
- Felix Magath (born 1953), German football manager
- Félix Malloum (1932–2009), Chadian military officer and politician
- Felix Manalo (1886–1963), Filipino Christian minister and founder of Iglesia ni Cristo
- Félix Mantilla (baseball) (1934–2025), Puerto Rican professional baseball player
- Félix Mantilla Botella (born 1974), Spanish tennis coach
- Félix Mathé (1834–1911), French politician
- Felix J. McCool (1912–1972), American military officer
- Felix Mendelssohn (1809–1847), German composer
- Felix Michel Melki (born 1994), Swedish-Lebanese footballer
- Félix Miélli Venerando (1927–2012), Brazilian football player
- Felix Morley (1894–1982), American journalist and college administrator
- Felix Neureuther (born 1984), German alpine ski racer
- Felix Nilsson (born 2005), Swedish ice hockey player
- Felix A. Obuah, Nigerian business magnate, politician and philanthropist
- Félix W. Ortiz (born 1959), American politician
- Félix Oukiné (born 1999), Cameroonian football player
- Felix Övermann (born 1985), German rower
- Felix Pappalardi (1939–1983), American musician and producer
- Felix Passlack (born 1998), German footballer playing for VFL Bochum
- Felix Perera (born 1945), Sri Lankan politician
- Felix Pipes (1887–1983), Austrian tennis player
- Félix Podmaniczky (1914–1990), Hungarian film director
- Félix Porteiro (born 1983), Spanish racecar driver
- Felix Potvin (born 1971), Canadian ice hockey goaltender
- Felix Prohaska (1912-1987), Austrian conductor and professor of musicology
- Felix Reda (born 1986), German researcher and politician
- Felix Riebl (born 1981), Australian singer-songwriter
- Felix Roco (born 1989), Filipino actor
- Félix Rodríguez (baseball) (born 1972), Dominican baseball player
- Félix Rodríguez (soldier) (born 1941), Cuban-American soldier and CIA intelligence operative
- Félix Rodríguez de la Fuente (1928–1980), Spanish naturalist and broadcaster
- Felix Rosenqvist (born 1991), Swedish professional racing driver
- Felix Salmon (born 1972), British American financial journalist
- Felix Sater (born 1966), Russian-American mobster
- Felix Schönebeck (born 1989), German politician
- Felix Schütz (born 1987), German ice hockey player
- Felix Siauw (born 1984), Chinese-Indonesian Islamic cleric, preacher, author and da'i
- Felix Silla (1937–2021), Italian actor
- Felix da Housecat (born Felix Stallings Jr., 1971), American DJ and record producer
- Felix Standaert, Belgian diplomat
- Felix Straub (born 1997), German bobsledder
- Felix Steiner (1896–1966), German Waffen-SS commander
- Félix Stevens (born 1964), Cuban sprinter
- Felix Swinstead (1880–1959), English pianist and composer
- Félix Torres (baseball) (born 1932), Puerto Rican baseball player
- Félix Trinidad (born 1973), Puerto Rican boxer
- Felix Unger (born 1946), Austrian heart surgeon and specialist
- Félix Varela (1788–1853), Cuban Catholic priest and independence leader
- Felix Wankel (1902–1988), German mechanical engineer
- Felix Weingartner (1863–1942), Austrian conductor, composer and pianist
- Felix D. Williamson (1921–1947), American pilot and United States Army Air Forces major
- Felix Yusupov (1887–1967), Russian aristocrat
- Archduke Felix of Austria (1916–2011), Archduke of Austria, Prince Royal of Hungary and Bohemia
- Count Felix of Monpezat (born 2002), member of the Danish royal family
- José Félix Uriburu (1868–1932), Argentinian Lieutenant
- Felix Zenger (born 1986), Finnish beatboxer
- Felix Zietmann (born 1990), German politician
- Felix von Zobel (born 1992), German politician
- León Félix Batista (born 1964), Dominican author and poet
- Prince Felix of Bourbon-Parma (1893–1970), son of the deposed Robert I, Duke of Parma
- Prince Félix of Luxembourg (born 1984), son of Grand Duke Henri of Luxembourg and Prince of Nassau
- Prince Felix of Schwarzenberg (1800–1852), Austrian statesman and nobleman

=== Surname ===
- Allyson Felix (born 1985), American track and field athlete
- António Félix da Costa (born 1991), Portuguese racing driver
- Bertha Felix Campigli (1882–1949), American Coast Miwok photographer
- Damien Félix, French singer-songwriter
- Fábio Felix (born 1985), Brazilian politician
- Hans O. Felix (born 1951), Norwegian trade unionist
- João Félix (born 1999), Portuguese footballer
- Joe Felix (born 1999), English footballer
- Julie Felix (1938–2020), American-British singer
- Julien Félix (fl. 1911), French aviator
- Kurt Felix (television presenter) (1941–2012), Swiss television presenter and entertainer
- Kurt Felix (athlete) (born 1988), Grenadian decathlete
- Margaret Elisabeth Felix (born 1937), Indian educator
- Miguel Ángel Félix Gallardo (born 1946), Mexican drug lord
- Murilo Félix (born 1988), Brazilian politician
- Stanley Felix (born 1963), Saint Lucian politician

== Fictional characters ==
- Felix the Cat, a cartoon character
- Felix Faust, a DC Comics villain sorcerer
- Felix Hugo Fraldarius, a playable character in the video game Fire Emblem: Three Houses
- Felix Gaeta, in the re-imagined Battlestar Galactica TV series
- Felix Holt, the title character in George Eliot's novel Felix Holt, the Radical
- Felix Jaeger, in the Gotrek and Felix series of books
- Felix Leiter, from the James Bond books and movies
- Felix Taggaro, recurring character in the television series One Tree Hill
- Felix Ungar, in the stage play, movie adaptation, and television series The Odd Couple
- Fix-It Felix Jr., from Disney's Wreck-It Ralph
- Felix Fathom, a major character in Miraculous: Tales of Ladybug & Cat Noir.

== See also ==
- Felicia
- Feliksas
