= Chasity =

Chasity is an English feminine given name, either a variant of the name Chastity or a combination of the names Charity and Chastity.

== Women ==
- Chasity Grant (born 2001), Dutch professional footballer
- Chasity Melvin (born 1976), American retired professional basketball player
- Chasity Wells-Armstrong (born c. 1971–72), American politician

== Fictional characters ==
- Chasity Babcock, a character on the 1990s television series The Nanny
