= Flicka (given name) =

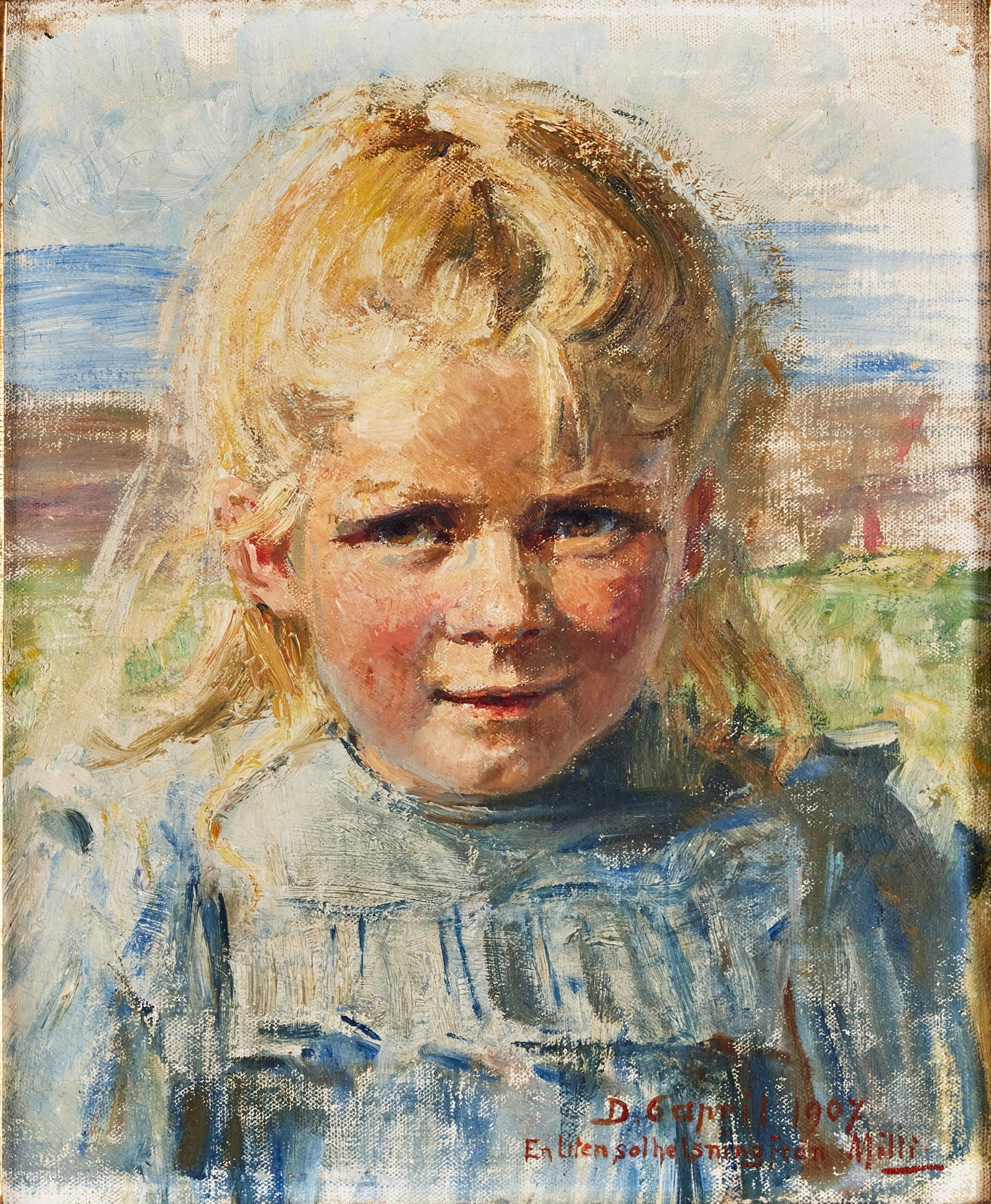
- Flicka by Emilia Lönblad, 1907.
- Gender: Feminine
- Language: English, Swedish

Origin
- Meaning: “Little girl”

Flicka is an English hypocorism for different names that is also occasionally used as a formal given name. "Flicka" is a Swedish word used in reference to a young girl.

The nickname is associated with Flicka, a fictional horse in a book trilogy published during the 1940s by American author Mary O’Hara about an American boy and his mustang horse Flicka. The books were adapted into a movie trilogy and a 1950s television series. The 2006 American film Flicka and its two sequels were loosely based on the previous books and films.

Flicka was also one of a set of fictional identical triplets in Flicka, Ricka, Dicka, the English language translations of a series of Swedish children's books by Swedish author/illustrator Maj Lindman that were published from the 1930s to the 1960s in the Anglosphere. The female triplets were called Rufsi, Tufsi, Tott in the original Swedish editions of the tales published during the 1920s in Sweden.

Flicka is often used as a name for pets. Flicka is also a surname of German origin.

== Nicknames ==
=== Women ===
- Felicity “Flicka” Huffman (born 1962), American actress
- Jessica ‘Flica” or “Flicka” Smith (born 1979), American woman who was a contestant on the American television series Survivor
- Frederica “Flicka” von Stade (born 1945), American semi-retired classical singer

=== Men ===
- Franklin “Flicka” Rodman Jr. (1965–1995), American hiker killed in a November 1995 accident on the Pacific Crest Trail

=== Pen name ===
- Mylène Flicka, pen name of Beninese blogger, activist and social media entrepreneur Marie-Madeleine Fifamè Akrota (born 1996)

== Fiction ==
- Flicka, one of a set of identical triplets in the children's book Flicka, Ricka, Dicka by Swedish author/illustrator Maj Lindman
- Flicka, a character in the 2005 American neo-noir black comedy crime film Kiss Kiss Bang Bang
- Flicka, a mustang horse in the 1941 novel My Friend Flicka and its two sequels, Thunderhead (1943) and Green Grass of Wyoming (1946) by American author Mary O'Hara
- Flicka, a horse in a series of film adaptations, My Friend Flicka (1943), Thunderhead, Son of Flicka (1945), and Green Grass of Wyoming (1948)
- Flicka, a horse in the 1956-1957 television series My Friend Flicka
- Flicka, the horse in the 2006 American film Flicka and its sequels, Flicka 2 (2010) and Flicka: Country Pride (2012)
- Fredericka "Flicka" von Grüsse, a character in the James Bond novels Never Send Flowers and SeaFire by John Gardner

== See also ==
- Flicka 20, American trailerable sailboat designed by Bruce Bingham as a cruiser and first built in 1974
- Flicka Da Wrist, a 2015 single by American rapper Chedda da Connect
- 100 dragspel och en flicka, a 1946 Swedish comedy film
- Flicka i kasern, a 1955 Swedish drama film
