= Chasteen (name) =

Chasteen is a name. It may refer to:

== Given name ==
- Chasteen C. Stumm (1848–1895) African American minister, teacher, and journalist

== Surname ==
- Joe Chasteen (1925–2021) American politician in the state of Wyoming
- John Charles Chasteen, American professor, cultural historian
- Stephanie Chasteen (1972–2024), American physics educator
