= Félicité =

Félicité may refer to:

== Geography ==
- Félicité (island), Seychelles
- Sainte-Félicité (disambiguation)
  - Sainte-Félicité, Chaudière-Appalaches, Quebec
  - Sainte-Félicité, Bas-Saint-Laurent, Quebec

== People ==
- Félicité Carrel, Italian mountaineer
- Félicité Fernig (1770–1841) sister who enlisted in the French army dressed as a man during the French revolutionary wars
- Félicité Du Jeu, French actress
- Félicité Ongouori Ngoubili (born 1959), Gabonese politician and diplomat
- Félicité Pricet (died 1794), French martyr

== Film ==
- Félicité (1979 film), Christine Pascal
- Félicité (2017 film), Alain Gomis

== Other ==
- French frigate Félicité (1785)
