= Born in Blood and Fire =

Book by John Charles Chasteen

Born in Blood and Fire: A Concise History of Latin America is a book by John Charles Chasteen, professor of history at the University of North Carolina at Chapel Hill.

== Summary ==
Chasteen covers the history of Latin America from 1492 to the present with an integrative approach that follows a chronological framework. The book is divided into chapters that address themes that were common throughout Latin America, such as colonialism, independence, progress, neocolonialism, nationalism, and revolution. Other themes that frequently come up in the book include issues of race, ethnicity, and class as well as the formation of republics. A timeline is provided at the beginning of the book; and various maps, photographs, and images are used throughout the book. Born in Blood and Fire was originally published by W. W. Norton and Company in 2001. Three other editions have been published since, the most recent in 2016. Later editions include updates and expansion of colonialism, nationalism, the Cuban Revolution, and current political and economic issues. W. W. Norton and Company published Chasteen's companion reader entitled Born in Blood and Fire: Latin American Voices in 2011. This book includes narratives from a variety of sources that illustrate life in Latin America during the last six centuries. Many of these excerpts from books, essays, and newspaper articles were translated by Chasteen.

== Other works by the author ==
Other books by the author include Americanos: Latin America's Struggle for Independence, Heroes on Horseback: A Life and Times of the Last Gaucho Caudillos, and National Rhythms, African Roots: The Deep History of Latin American Popular Dance. Chasteen is also known for his translation of Tulio Halperin Donghi’s The Contemporary History of Latin America.
