= Feliks =

Male given name

Feliks is a variant spelling of the given name Felix, used in Poland and the Baltic states, as well as in the transliteration of the name Felix from Russian.

Feliks may refer to:

- Feliks Ankerstein (1897–1955), Polish Army major and intelligence officer
- Feliks Asłanowicz (1903–1941), Polish footballer
- Feliks Gromov (1937–2021), former Commander-in-Chief of the Russian Navy
- Feliks Kark (born 1933), Estonian actor and caricaturist
- Feliks Kibbermann, Estonian chess master
- Feliks Kon (1864–1941), Polish communist activist
- Feliks Konarski (1907–1991), Polish poet, songwriter and cabaret performer
- Feliks Koneczny (1862–1949), Polish historian and social philosopher
- Feliks Kazimierz Potocki (1630–1702), Polish noble, magnate and military leader
- Feliks Nowowiejski (1877–1946), Polish composer
- Feliks Stamm (1901–1976), Polish boxing coach
- Feliks Topolski (1907–1989), Polish-born British expressionist painter
- Feliks Ulanbekov, Kyrgyzstani sambist
- Feliks Undusk (born 1948), Estonian journalist and politician.
- Feliks Villard (1908–?), Estonian chess player
- Feliks Zamoyski (died 1535), Polish nobleman
- Feliks Zemdegs (born 1995), Australian Rubik's Cube speedcuber
