= Temperance (given name) =

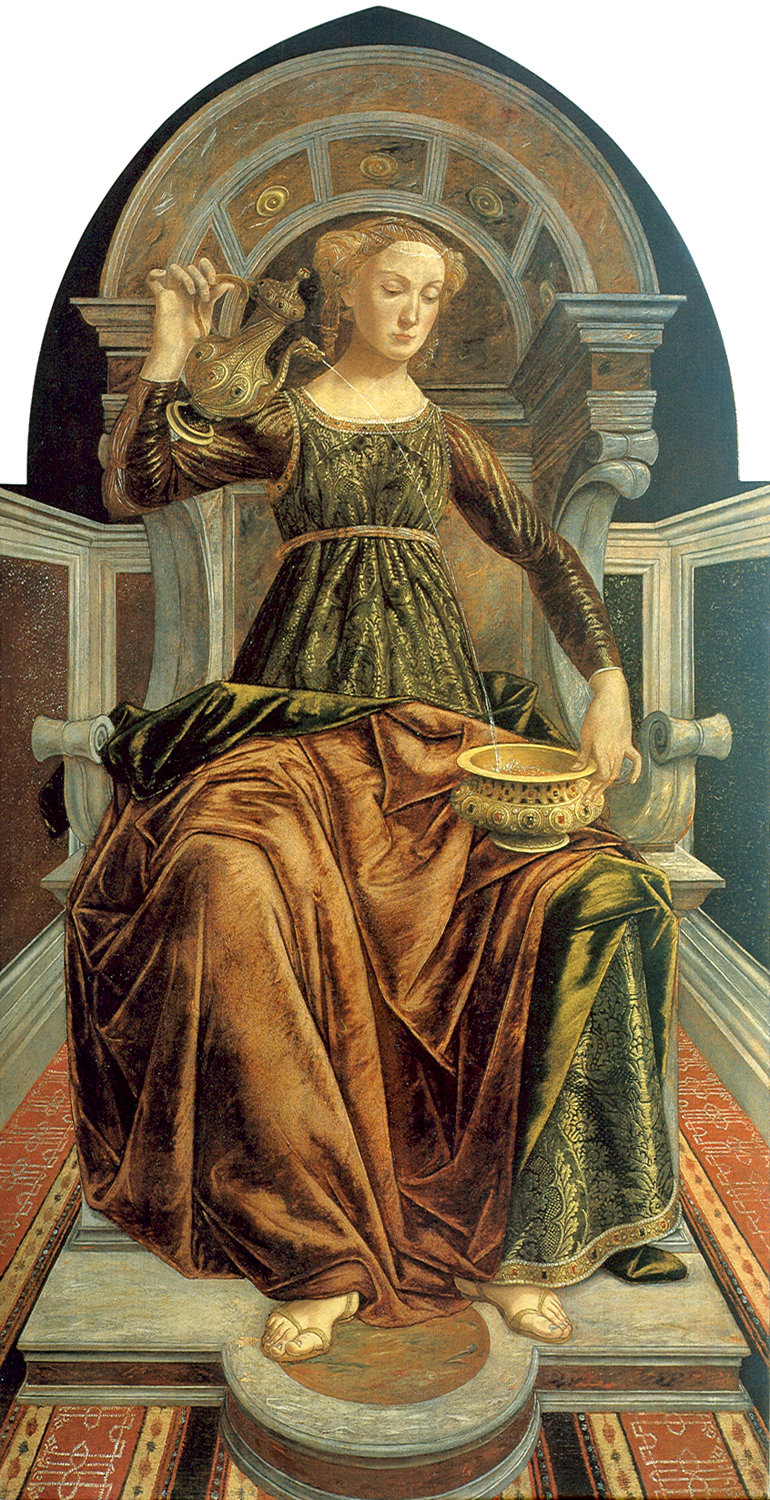
- Temperance by Piero del Pollaiolo
- Gender: Female
- Language: English

Origin
- Meaning: Temperance

Other names
- Related names: Tempe, Tempy

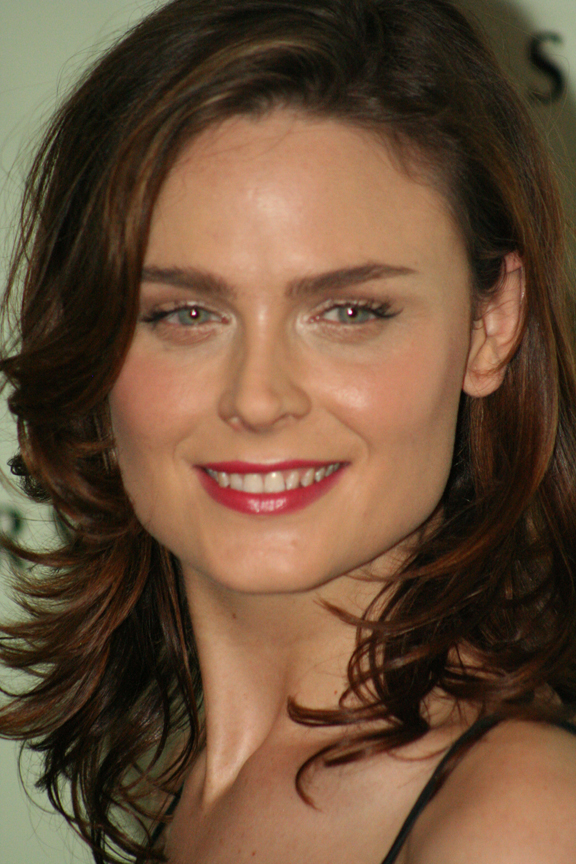
Actress Emily Deschanel portrayed Temperance "Bones" Brennan in the American FOX television series Bones from 2005 to 2017.

Temperance is a primarily feminine given name, usually given in reference to the virtue of moderation. Temperance was among the virtue names in regular use by Puritan families in the 1500s and 1600s. The name was among the top 150 names used for girls in the 1790s in the United States, the time period when it was most popular. The name remained in use during the 19th century in the United States, with the hypocorism Tempy documented in the American South. The nickname is also spelled Tempe.

The name was later strongly associated with the temperance movement of the 19th and early 20th centuries, which advocated either moderation or complete abstinence from the drinking of alcoholic beverages.

Recent usage in the Anglosphere was inspired by Temperance "Bones" Brennan, a character in the American FOX television series Bones, which aired from 2005 to 2017. The name ranked among the 1,000 most popular given names for newborn American girls between 2011 and 2014.

== Notable people ==
- Temperance Flowerdew (1590–1628), an early settler of the Jamestown Colony in Virginia
- Temperance Wick (1758–1822), American Revolutionary War heroine

== Fictional characters ==
- Temperance Brennan, protagonist of novels by Kathy Reichs
- Temperance "Bones" Brennan, in the American TV series Bones
