= Felicia Rudolphina Scatcherd =

English journalist and spiritualist

Felicia Rudolphona Scatcherd
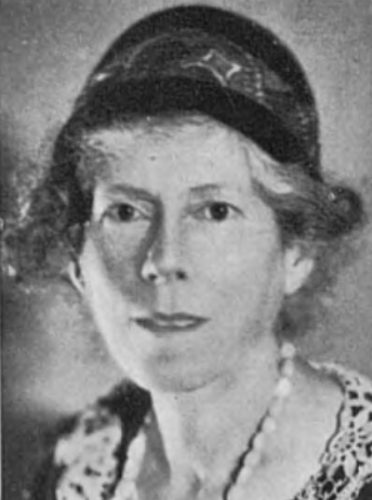
- Born: August 10, 1862; 7 Chepstow Place, Bayswater, City of Westminster
- Died: March 12, 1927 (aged 64); 14 Park Square East, St Pancras, London
- Occupations: Journalist, spiritualist

Felicia Rudolphina Scatcherd (10 August 1862 – 12 March 1927) was an English journalist and spiritualist.

== Biography ==
Felicia Scatcherd was born to Watson Scatcherd, a retired member of the Indian Civil Service, and his wife Emily Frances Crofton. She lived with her parents in Kensington, London, until her mother's death in 1901.

Before her death, Scatcherd's mother had introduced her to William Thomas Stead, editor of the Pall Mall Gazette, who assisted Scatcherd in starting her journalistic career.

Scatcherd rose to be the editor of the Psychic Review, as well as a lecturer in support of mediums. She was interested in spirit photography and frequently practiced it. She was associated with the International Club for Psychical Research and was continental editor of the International Psychic Gazette. Scatcherd later gave Sir Arthur Conan Doyle the means to obtain the notorious photographs of the Cottingley Fairies.

Scatcherd lived with Platon Soterios Drakoulès and his wife for many years and assisted him in lobbying the Committee of Union and Progress to form an alliance with the British.

In 1914 Scatcherd released a booklet, A Wise Man from the East, which included details of her efforts to spread the Baháʼí Faith in Turkey. From 1916 to 1919 she was editor of the Imperial and Asiatic Quarterly Review. In the 1920s she was a member of the council of the East India Association.

Scatcherd died of breast cancer in London on 12 March 1927.

== Bibliography ==
- Scatcherd, Felicia (1954). Jordan Past: A Series of Communications. London: Psychic Book Club. p. 171.
- Scatcherd, Felicia (1926), Ectoplasm as Associated with Survival, London: The Two Worlds Publishing Co Ltd
- Scatcherd, Felicia (1921). Meister in Indien. p. 37.
- Scatcherd, Felicia (1918). Greek Notes. London: East and West. p. 372.
- Scatcherd, Felicia (1914). A Wise Man from the East: Abdul Baha. Unity Press. p. 18.
