= John Charles Chasteen =

American translator, historian, and educator

John Charles Chasteen (born 1955) is an American translator, historian, and educator. He is a cultural historian of Latin America, and a professor emeritus at the University of North Carolina at Chapel Hill.

== Selected works ==
- Americanos: The Struggle for Latin American Independence. New York and London: Oxford University Press, 2008.
- National Rhythms, African Roots: The Deep History of Latin American Popular Dance. Albuquerque: University of New Mexico Press, 2004.
- (Co-Editor with James Wood) Problems in Modern Latin American History: Sources and Interpretations Wilmington, DE: Scholarly Resources, 2004.
- (Co-Editor with Sara Castro Klarén) Beyond Imagined Communities: Reading and Writing the Nation in Nineteenth-Century Latin America. Washington, DC: Woodrow Wilson Center Press, 2003.
- Born in Blood and Fire: A Concise History of Latin America. New York: W.W. Norton, 2001. (2nd edition, 2006; History Book Club Alternate Selection)
- (Editor and translator) The Mystery of Samba: Popular Music and National Identity in Brazil, by Hermano Vianna. Chapel Hill: University of North Carolina Press, 1999.
- (Editor and translator) The Lettered City, by Angel Rama. Duke University Press, 1996.
- Heroes on Horseback: A Life and Times of the Last Gaucho Caudillos. Albuquerque: University of New Mexico Press, 1995.
- (Editor and translator) The Contemporary History of Latin America, by Tulio Halperín Donghi. Durham, NC: Duke University Press, 1993.
- (Editor, contributor, and translator) Problems in Modern Latin American History. Wilmington, DE: Scholarly Resources, 1993.
- (under contract with Hackett Publishers) Latin American Independence: A Documents Reader, editor and translator.
