= Felicia Chateloin =

Cuban architect (b. 1949)

Felicia Chateloin (born 1949), also known as Felicia Chateloín Santiesteban, is a Cuban architect and educator, specialized in conservation, rehabilitation of built patrimony (heritage buildings), and in urban historic preservation.

== Preservation and rehabilitation specialist ==
Chateloin was a graduate of the school of architecture at the University of Havana.

As a member of the National Centre of Conservation, Restoration and Museology (CENCREM), Chateloin played a key role in developing the institutional procedure for the designation of the Historic Urban Zones in Havana, Cuba.

She served as technical consultant to the Havana City Historian's Office (OHCH) in the implementation of the first comprehensive survey of historic structures in La Habana Vieja (Old Havana).

== Teaching ==
Chateloin is a professor at the Faculty of Architecture, Polytechnic José Antonio Echeverría (CUJAE), and at the San Geronimo University College of the University of Havana.

== Publications ==
Her book, La Habana de Tacón, remains the most extensive study of Miguel Tacón y Rosique's contributions to Havana in the first half of the 19th century. Chateloin has published numerous articles in international publications, such as De la arquitectura del molde o la identidad de la ciudad cubana. and Techos de armaduras de pares en La Habana Vieja.

== Awards ==
- 2010 – Research Award from the Cuban Sciences Academy 2009. El Patrimonio cultural urbano y el criterio de centro histórico. Caso de estudio Ciudad de La Habana.
- 2008 - Architecture and Engineering Award 2008. Article Published: “Las armaduras de pares en la Habana Vieja. El privilegio de su Conservación”, Gabinete de Arqueología No 6, Año 6, 2007. Pág. 49-60.
- 2007 - National Architecture Salon Award. Essay published: “Colón, un territorio clave en el desarrollo habanero”, El Barrio de Colón Ed. Pontón Caribe SA, 2006. Pág. 11-38.
- 2005 - Architecture and Engineering Award 2005, City of Havana. Published article: “Miramar o los orígenes de la Tierra Prometida”. Arquitectura y Urbanismo 1/2004. Pág. 52 – 63.
- 2003 - Mention. National Architecture Salon. Publication: “La arquitectura del molde: un patrimonio en peligro”. Cimientos. Año 4-No 6, 2003. Pág. 41-47.
- 1992 - Outstanding Research. CENCREM-Ministry of Culture 1992. Regulaciones Urbanísticas Municipales de Zona de Valor, Ciudad de La Habana: metodología y realización. (Principal Researcher).
- 1991 – First Place Project Award, Non-built Project: Old Square. Walter Betancourt Contest, IV Havana Biennial.
- 1990 – Diploma from Ministry of Culture for Most Outstanding Scientific Achievement to the Group of Authors participating in the restoration of the first cloister from the Santa Clara Convent, CENCREM Headquarters, and of the Old Square group of monuments and its reimplementation.
- 1986 – National Contest Interarch 87. Urban Project Old Square (category: non-built project) awarded: Dos Plazas; selected to represent Cuba in Bulgaria.

== Recognitions ==
- 2011 – Lifetime and Provincial Work, Havana. UNAICC Architectural Society.
- 2008 – Member Emeritus of the “Cátedra Regional UNESCO, de la Conservación Integral de los Bienes Culturales para América Latina y el Caribe (CRECI)”
- 2000 - High Level Professional Award from the Construction Engineers and Architects National Union of Cuba.
- 1996 - Distinguished Host Diploma from the City of Sucre, Bolivia.
- 1992 - Laureate National Award for outstanding work in the cultural field. Culture Workers National Syndicate.
