= Feliks Asłanowicz =

Polish footballer

Personal information
- Date of birth: 12 April 1903
- Place of birth: Humniska, Poland
- Date of death: 1941 (aged 37–38)
- Place of death: Kiev, Soviet Union
- Height: 1.68 m (5 ft 6 in)
- Position: Forward

Senior career*
| Years | Team | Apps | (Gls) |
| –1923 | Pogoń Lwów | | |
| 1923 | Lwów | | |
| 1923–1927 | Sparta Lwów | | |
| 1927 | Ekran Lwów | | |
| 1927–1929 | Legia Warsaw | 2 | (0) |
| 1930–1934 | Oldboye Lwów | 0 | |
- * Club domestic league appearances and goals

Feliks Asłanowicz (12 April 1903 – 1941) was a Polish professional footballer who played as a forward in Liga Piłki Nożnej for Legia Warsaw. He was tortured to death by NKVD forces in the summer of 1941 during the Second World War.
