= Felix Herkens =

German politician (born 1995)

Member of the Landtag of Baden-Württemberg
- Incumbent
- Assumed office 14 April 2021
- Constituency: Pforzheim

Personal details
- Born: 15 March 1995 (age 31) Pforzheim
- Party: Alliance 90/The Greens (since 2013)

Felix Herkens (born 15 March 1995 in Pforzheim) is a German politician serving as a member of the Landtag of Baden-Württemberg since 2021. He has been a city councillor of Pforzheim since 2016.
