= Faith Nakut =

Faith Nakut (Nakut Faith Loru Chuna)
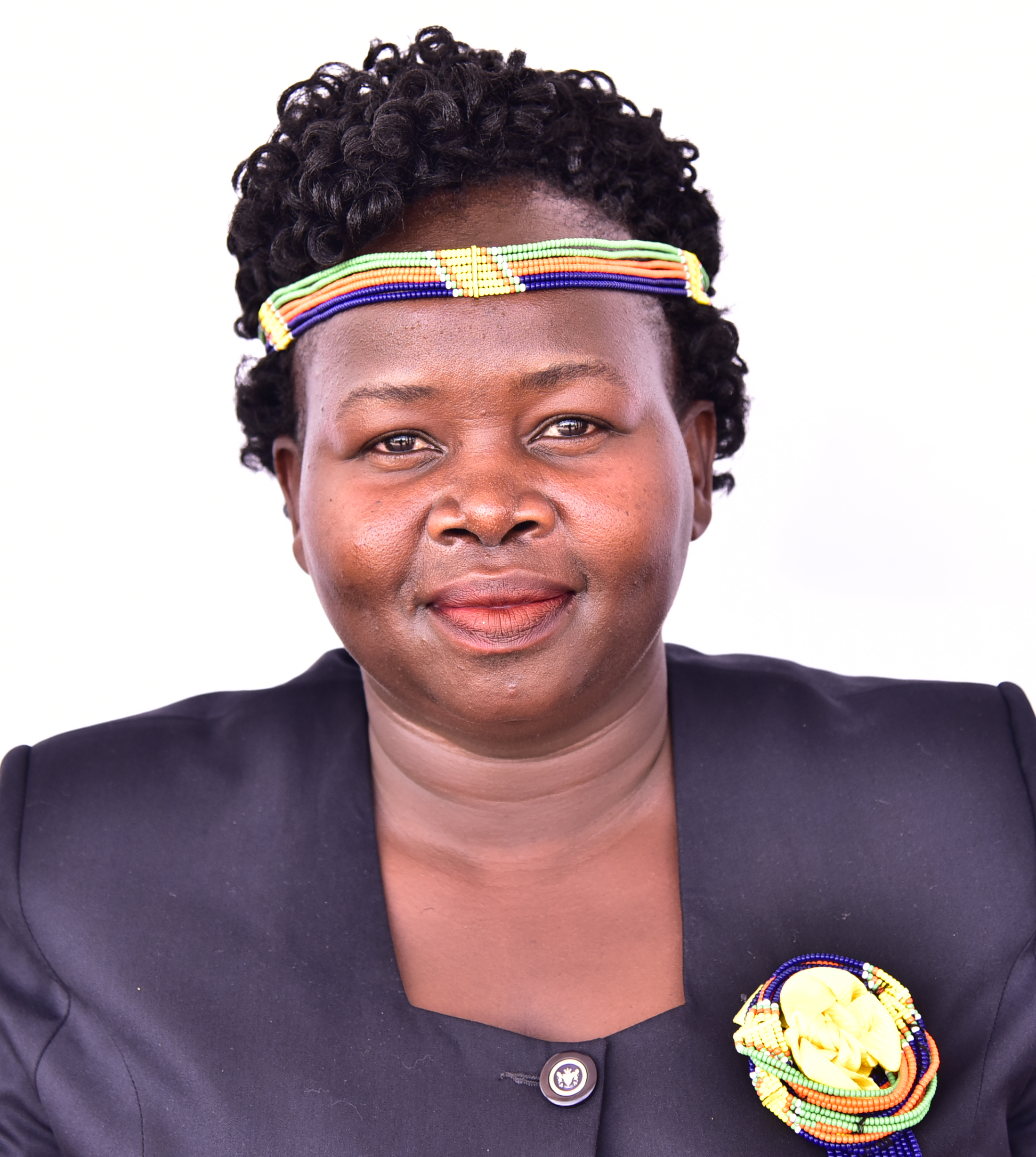
- Faith Nakut

Woman Member of Parliament for Napak District
- Incumbent
- Assumed office 2021

Personal details
- Born: Uganda
- Party: National Resistance Movement (NRM)
- Occupation: Politician
- Known for: Woman MP, Napak District (11th Parliament); Advocacy on maternal health in Karamoja; Opposition to mandatory degree requirements for nursery teachers; Work on literacy challenges in Karamoja; Campaigns against child trafficking
- Committees: Finance Committee; Physical Infrastructure Committee; Public Accounts Committee (Local Government)

Faith Nakut also known as Nakut Faith Loru Chuna is a Ugandan politician and woman member of Parliament of Uganda representing Napak district in the eleventh Parliament of Uganda under the National Resistance Movement political party.

== Political office ==
In 2024, she tasked the Ministry of Health to investigate the increased cases of maternal deaths at Moroto Regional Referral following the death of Sarah Nadiye, the 12th woman to die in 2024 within Karamoja region. She asked the Parliament of Uganda to reject the Ministry of Education policy that requires all nursery teachers to have degrees. She also commented on the low literacy levels in Karamoja region. Faith also currently serves on the Finance Committee, Physical Infrastructure Committee, and Public Accounts (Local Government) Committee at the Parliament of Uganda. She has also advocated against child trafficking in the region.

== See also ==
- List of members of the eleventh Parliament of Uganda
- Parliament of Uganda
- Napak district
- National Resistance Movement
