= Faith Gibson =

British nurse, academic, and researcher

Professor Faith Gibson FRCN
- Education: London South Bank University (PhD)
- Scientific career
- Fields: Childhood cancer Cancer survivorship Cancer communication Patient and family experience
- Workplaces: Great Ormond Street Hospital; Nottingham University Hospitals NHS Trust
- Thesis: Defining specialist practice through competencies : the notion of the general and specialist children's nurse (2001)
- Website: www.gosh.nhs.uk/our-people/staff-z/professor-faith-gibson

Faith Gibson FRCN is a British nurse who is Deputy Chief Nurse for Research, Nursing and Allied Health and Professor of Child Health and Cancer Care at Great Ormond Street Hospital. Her research investigates cancer care for children and young people. She was awarded the International Society of Paediatric Oncology Lifetime Achievement Award in 2018.

== Early life and education ==
Gibson trained as a nurse at the Nottingham University Hospitals NHS Trust. She specialised in paediatric nursing and oncology at the Royal Marsden Hospital, and joined Great Ormond Street Hospital in 1986. She worked toward a graduate degree at the University of Surrey and a doctorate on general and specialist children's nursing at London South Bank University.

== Research and career ==
Gibson is dedicated to training clinical academics in child health. She has also worked on strategies to improve the skills of the nursing workforce in cancer care. In 2009, Gibson was made Clinical Professor of Children's Cancer Care, and Director of the Centre for Nursing and Allied Health Research and Evidenced Based Practice. She has created guidance for conducting focus groups with children and young people, emphasising the need for early planning, attention to be paid to group composition, location and identifying the appropriate moderator.

In 2018, Gibson was awarded the International Society for Paediatric Oncology Lifetime Achievement Award. She was the first nurse to receive the award.

=== Awards and honours ===
- 2007 Elected Fellow of the Royal College of Nursing (FRCN)
- 2018 International Society for Paediatric Oncology Lifetime Achievement Award
- 2020 Fellow of American Academy of Nursing

=== Selected publications ===
- Transition of care for adolescents from paediatric services to adult health service
- Conducting focus groups with children and young people: strategies for success
- Guideline for the management of fever and neutropenia in children with cancer and/or undergoing hematopoietic stem-cell transplantation
