= Felicia Kwaku =

Nigerian-British nurse

Felicia Kwaku OBE FRCN
- Born: 1968 (age 57–58)
- Citizenship: United Kingdom
- Occupation: Nurse
- Known for: Advocacy for minority nurses in the UK

Felicia Margaret Kwaku OBE FRCN is a nurse and executive hospital administrator in NHS England. In 2020, she was awarded the OBE for services to nursing during the COVID-19 pandemic. Kwaku serves as the Associate Director of Nursing for Acute Speciality Medicine at King’s College Hospital in London, England and is the Chair of the Chief Nursing Officers Black and Minority Ethnic Strategic Advisory Group at the NHS.

Across NHS England, Kwaku advocated for Black, Asian and Minority Ethnic (BAME) nurses when it became clear these groups were being disproportionately affected by COVID-19. She delivered webinars, which reached thousands of caregivers at a time when they felt vulnerable and needing information. She advocated for appropriate risk assessments and PPE for nursing staff and other clinical colleagues as the pandemic was advancing.

Kwaku practiced as a cardiothoracic/intensive care nurse in the United Kingdom for more than 30 years before receiving the OBE honor. She was awarded Fellowship of the Royal College of Nursing in 2025.
