= Faith Lanman Gorrell =

American home economist

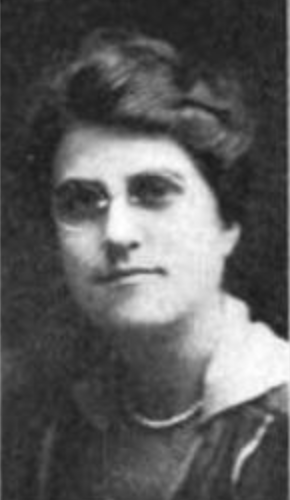
- Faith Lanman Gorrell, from a 1920 publication
- Born: Faith Robinson Lanman; 1881; New London, Connecticut
- Died: October 9, 1966 (aged 84–85); Columbus, Ohio
- Occupations: Home economist, educator
- Relatives: Charles Rockwell Lanman (uncle)

Faith Robinson Lanman Gorrell (1881 – October 9, 1966) was an American home economist and educator. She was director of the School of Home Economics at Ohio State University from 1929 to 1945.

== Early life and education ==
Lanman was born in New London, Connecticut, the daughter of Jonathan (or John) Trumbull Lanman and Charlotte Elizabeth Stilwell Lanman. Her uncle Charles Rockwell Lanman was a professor of Sanskrit at Harvard University. She graduated from Ohio State University in 1903. She earned a second bachelor's degree from Teachers College, Columbia University in 1907.

== Career ==
Gorrell taught school in Florida as a young woman. She was appointed director of domestic science in the Columbus public schools in 1907. She worked on food conservation projects for the Ohio State College of Agriculture during World War I. She joined the faculty of the School of Home Economics at Ohio State University in 1920, succeeding Edna Noble White as the head of the home economics department. When the department became the School of Home Economics, she became the new school's director. In 1941, she was chair of a conference titled "Nutrition in Defense", held on the Ohio State campus.

Gorrell resigned from the director post in 1945, but remained on the faculty until 1957, and worked on building a placement service for the school's alumni. A Faith Lanman Gorrell scholarship was established in her honor in 1952, by the Ohio State University Home Economics Alumnae Association.

== Publications ==
- Handbook of Recipes (1918)
- "The Effect of the Use of Salt in Cooking Vegetables" (1927, with Elsie Steiger Minton)
- The Family's Food (1937, with Hughina McKay and Frances Zuill)
- Foods Workbook (1939, with Hughina McKay)
- Food and Family Living (1947, with Hughina McKay and Frances Zuill)

== Personal life ==
Lanman married Edmund Morgan Gorrell in 1932. Her husband died in 1948, and she died in 1966, at the age of 84, at a nursing home in Columbus, Ohio.
