= Faith Bikani =

South African politician

Member of the National Assembly of South Africa
- In office 6 May 2009 – 6 May 2014

Personal details
- Born: Faith Claudine Bikani
- Party: African National Congress
- Occupation: Politician

Faith Claudine Bikani is a South African politician who served as a Member of the National Assembly of South Africa from 2009 until 2014. She was elected in the 2009 general election as a member of the African National Congress. She served on the Standing Committee on the Auditor-General and was acting chairperson of the Portfolio Committee on Mineral Resources. Bikani was not included on any ANC candidate list for the 2014 general election; she left parliament at the election as a result.

In November 2010, it was revealed that airport customer care service agent Nomabali Ndalana had laid assault charges against Bikani after she was allegedly assaulted by Bikani during an altercation over her luggage being taken to the Kulula lost property office at the Cape Town International Airport in July of the same year.
