= Felicia Hill-Briggs =

American behavioral and social scientist

- Born: 25 November 1965
- Died: 23 June 2023

Academic background
- Education: BA, Psychology, American University; PhD, Clinical Psychology and Health Psychology, 1994, Pennsylvania State University

Felicia Hill-Briggs was an American behavioral and social scientist.

== Early life and education ==
Hill-Briggs was diagnosed with type 1 diabetes at the age of nine. She received her bachelor's degree in psychology from American University and her doctoral degree in Clinical Psychology and Health Psychology from Pennsylvania State University. Following this, she completed her internship in Medical Consultation and Liaison and Clinical Neuropsychology at New York University Medical Center and Bellevue Hospital, followed by a postdoctoral fellowship in Geropsychology and Geriatric Neuropsychology at the Polisher Research Institute at the Philadelphia Geriatric Center.

== Career ==
Upon completing her formal education, Hill-Briggs served on the faculty of New York University Medical Center/Rusk Institute of Rehabilitation Medicine before joining the faculty at Johns Hopkins University (JHU) in 1996. During her early tenure at JHU, Hill-Briggs published Problem solving in diabetes self-management: A model of chronic illness self-management behavior and Problem Solving in Diabetes Self-management and Control. In 2009, she was the Fullwood Foundation, Inc's Valued Hours Awardee for her professional and community activities in diabetes prevention and care.

As an associate professor of general internal medicine, Hill-Briggs co-developed a diabetes education program that taught low-income, poorly educated diabetics to better manage their disease. She later received a bronze Telly Award for the video DECIDE to Move! Physical Activity for People with Type 2 Diabetes. The video was developed as part of Project DECIDE, a clinical research study on self-management support interventions for urban patients with type 2 diabetes. Later that year, she also received the Nelson Butters Award for the best research paper published in the Archives of Clinical Neuropsychology for her 2010 article Cranial volume, mild cognitive deficits, and functional limitations associated with diabetes in a community sample.

During her tenure at JHU, Hill-Briggs served as the senior director of Population Health Research and Development for Johns Hopkins HealthCare and a core faculty member of Johns Hopkins Bloomberg School of Public Health's Welch Center for Prevention, Epidemiology and Clinical Research. In 2015, Hill-Briggs was named to the board of directors of the American Diabetes Association and became the 201st woman to be promoted to the rank of full professor at the Johns Hopkins University School of Medicine. Two years later, Hill-Briggs was elected president of health care and education for the American Diabetes Association.

As a result of her research, Hill-Briggs was elected a member of the National Academy of Medicine in 2017. She was also awarded the Rachmiel Levine Medal in recognition of leadership and service to the American Diabetes Association. During the COVID-19 pandemic, Hill-Briggs was awarded $43 million over five years to study the type 2 diabetes epidemic as part of a statewide population health initiative.

In 2021, Hill-Briggs was appointed Vice President of Prevention at Northwell Health and Simons Distinguished Chair in Clinical Research at the Donald and Barbara Zucker School of Medicine, Hofstra University where she continued her research on disease prevention. In 2023, the Johns Hopkins Department of Medicine established the Dr. Felicia Hill-Briggs Health Equity Trailblazer in Diabetes Award Endowment in her honor.

== Personal life ==
Dr. Hill-Briggs died of ovarian cancer in June 2023.
