= Felicia Tuczek =

German composer and pianist

Felicia Johanna Tuczek (September 1849 – 7 January 1905) was a composer and pianist who is best remembered today for her String Quartet in f minor. Her birthplace is variously given as Bohemia, Berlin, or Vienna; as an adult, she lived in Germany.

Tuczek was born into a musical family. Her grandfather was composer and educator Franz Tuczek (1782 – 1850). Her aunt was the singer Leopoldine Tuczek. Her sister, Clara, also a singer, married composer and conductor Max Bruch.

Felicia Tuczek studied with Clara Schumann, then worked as a concert pianist, composer, and piano teacher. One of her piano students was the German paper manufacturer and cultural benefactor Maria Zanders. Her string quartet was published by Steingraeber Verlag in 1904 and premiered in Berlin.
