= Faith Avis =

Canadian female, highly educated

Eileen Faith Avis (née Hutchison; 1924—2010) was a Canadian journalist, writer, naturalist and mother of three. She was indirectly involved in the creation of A Dictionary of Canadianisms on Historical Principles and other dictionaries of Canadian English by Gage Ltd. As an unpaid female "assistant" to her linguist husband at the time, she was not afforded, common for women in the 1950s and 1960s, official recognition for contributions to the study of Canadian English.

== Early life and education ==
Faith Avis was born in Spalding, Saskatchewan. She earned a BA in journalism from Carleton University in 1945 as one of the two first graduates in journalism in Canada. One of her examiners was Douglas Leechman, who would become, with Avis's husband Walter S. Avis, one of the six editors of A Dictionary of Canadianisms on Historical Principles (1967) — the "Big Six" in Canadian English —and later a major Canadian contributor to the Oxford English Dictionary.

== Career ==
She was a regular contributor of reviews to the Kingston Whig-Standard daily newspaper. Consistent with her own role as a first woman as journalism graduate and PR person for a Canadian hospital, Avis published on disprivileged women, advice all this in the Canadian prison system. She was Honorary President of the Kingston Field Naturalists until her death on 6 February 2010.

=== Role in Canadian English ===
In the 1950s and 1960s, women usually only played minor roles in linguistic research, if any. A recent biographer of Walter Avis and Charles J. Lovell reasons that "Faith Avis may have played a more major role in Canadian English than first meets the eye," as, common in these days, she not only typed her husband's manuscripts but had the university contracts on account of her education that her husband lacked. Faith hosted at least one academic event at Carleton with her husband. Walter S. Avis, who, together with Lovell, is considered as a "founder" of Canadian English as a linguistic subject. Walter Avis

"must have met Faith Hutchison [in 1945/46 in Ottawa], who was just about to graduate with her BA in journalism. Faith Hutchison was not just anyone. She was nothing less than one of the best-educated women the country at that point in time."

At present there are no reliable indicators to suggest that Faith Avis directly carried out research on Canadian English. That role as the earliest female researcher on Canadian English is currently reserved for Helen C. Munroe from Montreal and her 1929, 1930 and 1931 papers in American Speech on Montreal English. Faith Avis held a university degree in 1946 from Carleton when her husband had not yet entered the right to attend university in nearby Kingston, Ontario. By the end of his career Walter Avis was compared to Noah Webster and H.L. Mencken, who created the linguistic autonomy of American English. The linguistic autonomy of Canadian English was achieved by Walter S. Avis, with the considerable support of Faith Avis, Charles J. Lovell and their team

== Works ==
- Faith, Avis. 2002. Women in Cages The Prison for Women and the Elizabeth Fry Society. Markham, ON: Quarry Press.
