= Felicity Evans =

Journalist and BBC Wales political editor

Felicity Evans is a Welsh journalist and broadcaster, who has worked as the Political, later Money, Editor of BBC Wales since 2018.

She comes from Ebbw Vale, but was brought up in Manchester, and now lives in Cardiff. After studying law at the University of Oxford, with the original intention of becoming a barrister, she began her career as a broadcast journalist on BBC Radio Wales, where she became presenter of the flagship morning news magazine programme Good Morning Wales, alongside Oliver Hides with whom she had previously been a co-presenter on Good Evening Wales. She later became the main presenter on the politics programme Dragon's Eye. She moved on to present Week In Week Out and Eye on Wales, and now appears regularly on the nightly news programme Wales Today.

In 2019, Evans was named in fifth place on the WalesOnline "Pinc List" of influential LGBT+ people in Wales, having entered the list at number 25 in 2015.
