= Snipp, Snapp, Snurr =

Swedish children's book series

Snipp, Snapp, Snurr is the name of fictional triplets depicted in a series of children's books by author/illustrator Maj Lindman (1886–1972). The triplets, all boys with blond hair, live in Sweden and have light-hearted misadventures. The series of books was created in the 1920s in Sweden and then printed in English in the United States from the 1930s. Lindman also started a series of books featuring three sisters, Flicka, Ricka, Dicka, with similar themes. A 1936 New York Times review of the book Snipp Snapp Snurr and the Yellow Sled cited the Snipp, Snapp, Snurr series as "popular with the little children".

The series of books continued until approximately 1960. Some of Lindman's stories were included in a series of compilations called The Best of Children's Books.

== Books (incomplete) ==
- Snipp Snapp Snurr and the Red Shoes
- Snipp Snapp Snurr and the Big Surprise
- Snipp Snapp Snurr and the Reindeer
- Snipp Snapp Snurr Learn to Swim
- Snipp Snapp Snurr and the Buttered Bread
- Snipp Snapp Snurr and the Gingerbread
- Snipp Snapp Snurr and the Yellow Sled
- Snipp Snapp Snurr and the Seven Dogs
- Snipp Snapp Snurr and the Big Farm
- Snipp Snapp Snurr and the Magic Horse

== See also ==
- Moomin
