= Félicie d'Ayzac =

French poet and art historian

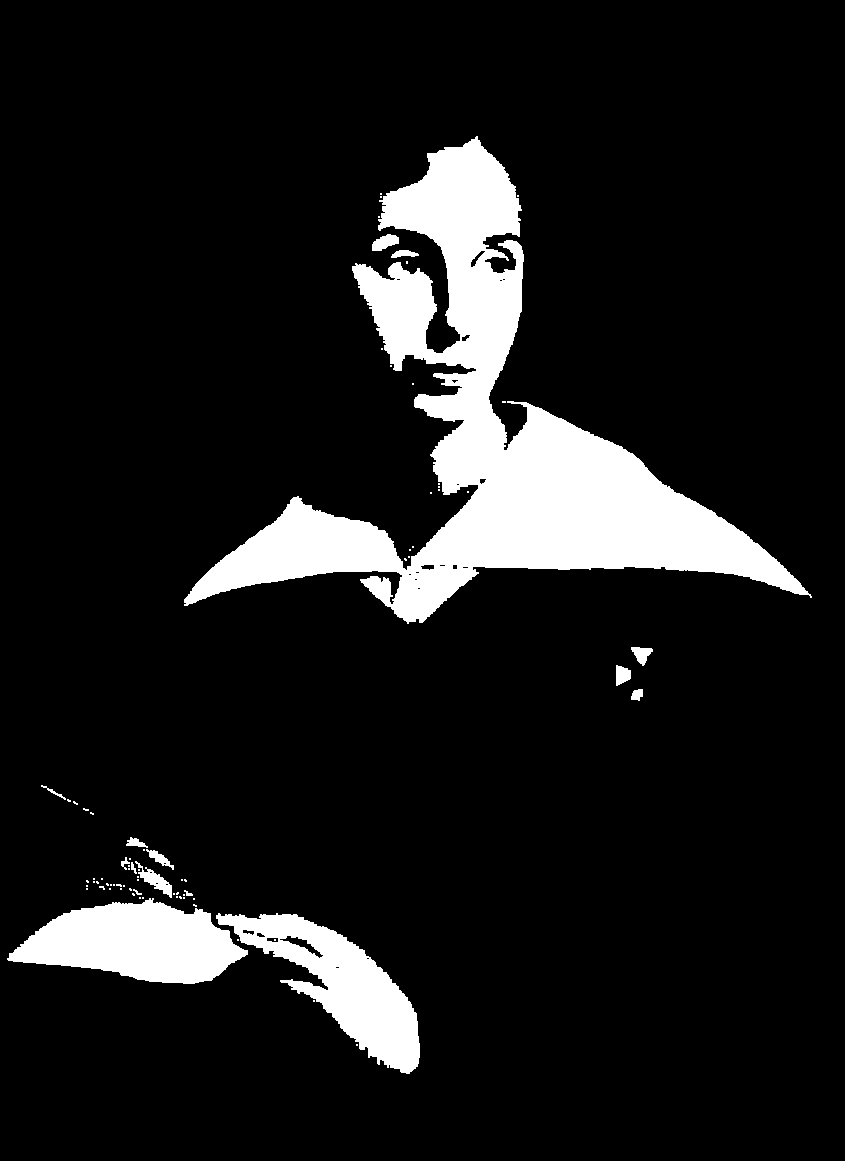
Félicie d'Ayzac

Félicie-Marie-Emilie d'Ayzac (1801–1881) was a French poet and art historian. She is remembered for her poetry collection Soupirs poétiques (1833), and for her Histoire de l'abbaye de Saint-Denis (History of Saint-Denis Abbey, 1861).

== Biography ==
Born in 1801, in Paris, d'Ayzac was a gifted and hard-working child. When she was 16, she joined the Legion of Honour School in Saint-Denis, soon becoming a dame professeur (lady teacher). She remained there for 35 years, first taking an interest in literature and poetry and later turning to the history of art, especially archaeology. After receiving recognition for her poetry in 1823 and 1824, her Soupirs received an award from the Académie française in 1843.

Her work on art and architecture was particularly impressive. In 1849 her description of statues in Chartres Cathedral (Statues de l'un des porches de la cathédrale de Chartres) was welcomed by the Académie des Inscriptions et Belles-Lettres. In 1861, the same institution awarded her a prize for her Histoire de l'abbaye de Saint-Denis. These early works contributed to her reputation as one of the first female art historians in France.

Other contributions on architecture include Histoire et emblèmes bibliques sculptés au pourtour extérieur du choeur de Notre-Dame de Paris published in Revue archéologique in 1845, and Symbolique des pierres précieuses ou tropologie des gemmes in 1846, both published in Revue archéologique. The same year, in the Annales archéologiques de Didron, she published Des quatre animaux apocalyptiques et de leurs représentations sur les églises au moyen-âge.

On her retirement, she moved to Castelnoubel Castle near Agen where she continued to write poetry and published further articles on biblical emblems, especially animals.

Félicie d'Ayzac died at Castelnoubel, Bon-Encontre, on 26 March 1881.
