= SnipSnap =

Mobile coupon app

- Developer: Ted Mann
- Initial release: September 2011
- Website: www.snipsnap.it

SnipSnap is a mobile coupon app founded in Philadelphia. It allows users to photograph a printed coupon to find or create a mobile coupon, which can be redeemed in-store.

== Overview ==
The app scans the text, images, logos, and barcodes within a photograph of a coupon to parse out all of the structured coupon content dynamically. The app uses some of this information to power features such as expiration-date reminders, location-based notifications (utilizing the store name, as well as the location of the phone), and scannable barcodes.

SnipSnap makes money through both targeted and affiliate offers. Depending on a user’s past habits and SnipSnap’s partnerships, companies, like Babies ‘R Us, can push coupons that look just like any other user-clipped coupon. For every “snip” of one of these coupons that results in an actual purchase, SnipSnap will get a kickback.

Mobile Commerce Daily says SnipSnap also works with retailers to manage location-based and "geo-conquesting" campaigns. The company has also begun promoting coupon content outside its mobile apps, and via third-party social media sites, mobile apps, and ad networks.

== Background ==
SnipSnap, based in Philadelphia, Pennsylvania, was founded by Ted Mann in September 2011, after Mann left his job at Gannett to start the company. It was incubated at DreamIt Ventures, a startup accelerator program in Philadelphia. It has investors, including venture capital firm MentorTech Ventures, and Michael G. Rubin (co-founder of GSI Commerce). The company has raised $1.5 million in seed funding. In November 2013, Valpak announced a partnership to syndicate all its coupon content to SnipSnap.

== Media coverage ==
SnipSnap won a MediaPost Appy award for the Best Finance App of 2013, and Best Shopping App of 2013 by About.com. The app was featured on the Katie Couric and Dave Ramsey shows in May 2013.

== Awards and accolades ==
- MediaPost Appy Award for the Best Finance App of 2013
- About.com Best Shopping App of 2013
- TechCrunch Disrupt Finalist
- Winner of Switch 3 Startup demo competition.
