= Faith Keza =

Rwandan technician and politician

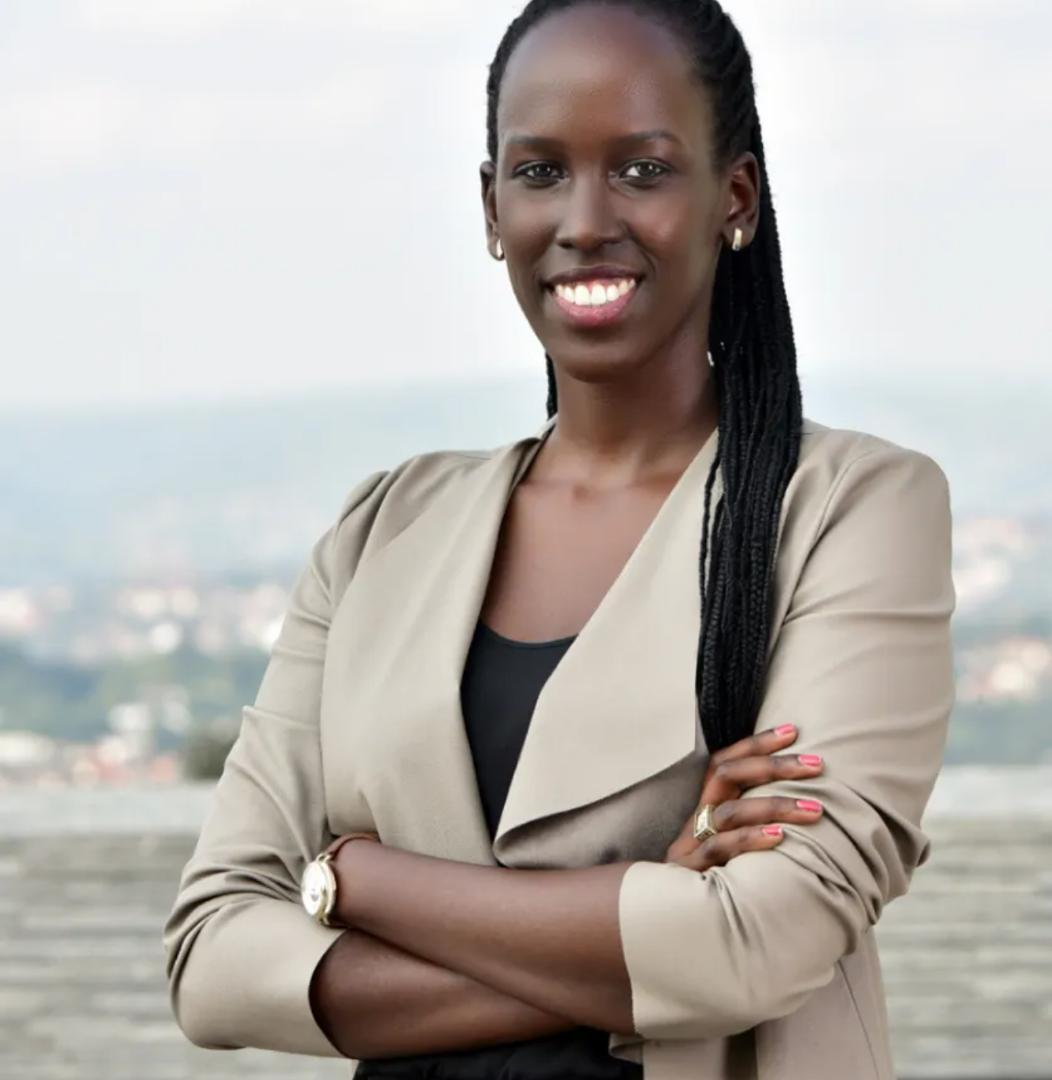
Keza Faith

Faith Keza is the CEO of Irembo Ltd, the Board Member in Rwanda Development Board (RDB) and the Board Member in Central Bank of Rwanda. She previously worked in Silicon Valley, California as a Software Engineer at Google, Delpix and Oracle.

== Education ==
In 2007, at 15 years old, Keza joined Gordonstoun Boarding School in Moray, Scotland. She holds a Bachelor of Science in Electrical Engineering and Computer science.
