= Zita Loseva =

Lithuanian politician (born 1954)

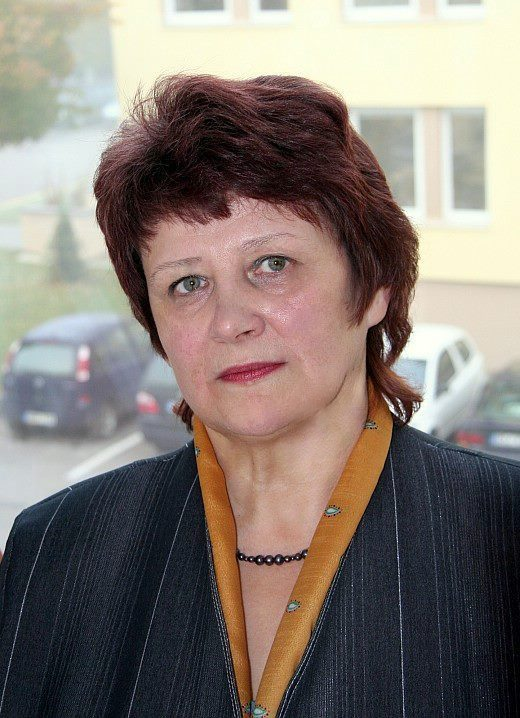
- Zita Loseva
- Born: 17 June 1954 (age 72)
- Education: Vilnius University
- Occupations: Lithuanian politician and public activist

Zita Loseva (born 17 June 1954 in Maironiai, Kelmė District Municipality) is a Lithuanian politician and public activist.

== Biography ==
In 1992 she graduated from Vilnius University, she has hold a master's degree in finance and economics. Since 2011 she has been a member of Kelmė District Council.

She is a chief of Šiauliai region State Internal Revenue Service department of Kelmė.

Member of Lithuanian Socialdemocratic Party's department of Kelmė County. Since 2011 she has been a member of Kelmė County Council.

During cadency of 2011–2015 at Kelmė County Council she was a member of Council Budget and Investment Committee. During elections of 2015, she was one more time elected to be a member of Kelmė County Council.
