= Felicity Campbell (artist) =

British artist

Felicity Campbell (born 1909) was a British painter and illustrator.

== Biography ==
Campbell was born and brought up in Sussex in southern England and, after being home-schooled, studied art in Paris, Rome and The Hague. In London she studied lithography and illustration with E. J. Sullivan. As well as working as a commercial artist, Campbell painted miniatures and illustrated a number of books. She also created works in pastels, watercolours and pencil and exhibited at the Royal Academy in London during the early 1960s and with the International Society of Sculptors, Painters and Gravers and at Walker's Gallery. For a time she lived at Guestling in Sussex.

== Books illustrated ==
- Haunted Houses of Britain by Elliott O'Donnell, 1930.
- The Pond by Marjorie Bowen, 1949.
- The Rosemary Book by Marjorie Bowen, 1949.
- Back of the North Wind by Marjorie Bowen, c.1952.
