= Felicity Brown =

British fashion designer

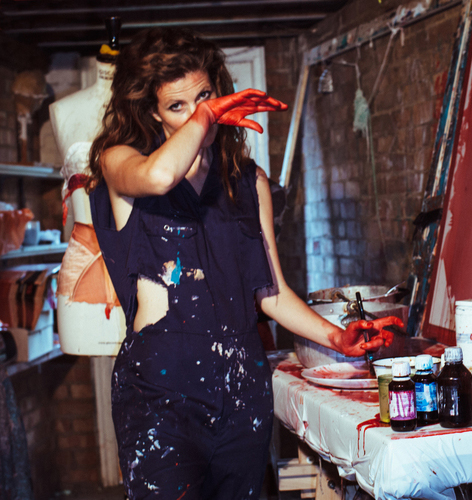
- Felicity Brown in her workshop
- Born: Felicity Hannah Brown; 28 February 1977 (age 49); Leytonstone, London
- Education: Glasgow School of Art and Royal College of Art

Felicity Brown is an English-born artist and designer. She lives and works in London in the United Kingdom. Her website is www.felicitybrown.co.uk.

She studied Fine Art and Printed Textiles at the Glasgow School of Art, receiving a first class honors degree. From there she went on to the Royal College of Art in London, graduating in 2002 with an MA in Textiles.

After leaving college, she gained experience in the European fashion houses, and craft skills from working in India, before setting up her own designer label with her brother, Henry Brown.

The Felicity Brown label was officially launched in London in February 2010 and featured Felicity's signature dip-dyed silks, hand printing and artisan finishing.

In 2010, the fashion magazine Vogue Italia noted: Raw yet refined, the collection shows the amazing attention for detail and fantastic creative talent that have marked Felicity’s career to date.

At the beginning of 2011, Felicity became part of NEWGEN, a talent identification scheme developed by the British Fashion Council that helped new fashion businesses to develop. This enabled Felicity to show collections in London, Paris and New York.

In 2011, the Victoria and Albert Museum asked Felicity Brown to create an exclusive dress for its 2012 Ballgowns Exhibition.

In 2012, curator Judith Clark commissioned a dress for the opening of a permanent exhibition at the Simone Handbag Museum in Seoul, South Korea.

In June 2012, model Erin O'Connor wore a unique dress by Felicity Brown at the Investec Derby.

Since 2013, Felicity Brown has been travelling on 'Fashion Journeys' throughout America and Europe. The concept involves taking a bag of fabric, meeting people, listening to their stories and making pieces for them in the moment. These journeys and stories have been documented through photography and are included on Felicity's website.

In 2015, Felicity Brown's 'Bird Dress' was included in The Fashion Project's exhibition at Bal Harbour Shops, Miami. The 'Bird Dress' was exhibited alongside pieces from Jean Cocteau, Elsa Schiaparelli, Léon Bakst and Hussein Chalayan.

In 2017, Felicity Brown's 'recycled silk and cotton top' was included in the Financial Times' 'How To Spend It' section.
