= Felicia F. Campbell =

American academic (1931–2020)

Felicia Florine Campbell (April 18, 1931 – July 27, 2020) was an American academic. She was Professor of English at the University of Nevada, Las Vegas. In 2012, she became the longest serving faculty member in the university's history. Campbell was president of the Popular Culture Association.

== Life and career ==
Born in Cuba City, Wisconsin, she received a B.S. in English from the University of Wisconsin, Madison in 1954, and a M.S. in English from the same university in 1957. She was one of the first female officer candidates in the United States Marine Corps. She later received a Ph.D. from the United States International University, San Diego, in 1973 with a thesis "The Gambling Mystique, Mythologies and Typologies".

Campbell joined the Southern Regional Division of Nevada's university system in 1962, five years after its inception. She expanded course offerings to include science fiction and popular culture at a time when only one other U.S. professor, Ray B. Browne, dared to so expand the traditional English Literature degree program. Later, Campbell directed the Asian Studies program at the university.

Campbell is founder in 1989 of the Far West Popular Culture and American Culture Associations and editor for 20 years of the bi-annual academic peer reviewed journal Popular Culture Review. The association has held annual conferences in Las Vegas, Nevada, for over 25 years. She has served as president of the national Popular Culture Association. She also reviewed books on KNPR-FM radio.

She died from COVID-19 in Las Vegas during the COVID-19 pandemic in Nevada.
