= Faith Anne =

- Born: Faith Ann Del Rosario Herminigildo; June 3, 1994 (age 32); Rizal, Philippines
- Genres: OPM, pop, soul
- Occupations: Music artist, singer
- Instruments: Vocals & acoustic guitar
- Years active: 2010–present
- Label: Popular Music Generation Philippines Freeform Entertainment

Faith Ann Del Rosario Herminigildo (born June 3, 1994), known as Faith Anne, is a Filipina singer, and television host.

Her singing talent was shown after given an opportunity to sing in the late night show in GMA’s Walang Tulugan with the Master Showman. After her appearance there she has made some appearances at different events around the country.

In addition, she also became popular on YouTube because of her own cover of other Asian pop songs, not only Filipino songs but also Korean Pop and Taiwanese Pop songs. At present she is focusing on her studies and her family.

== Early life ==
Faith Anne is the eldest child of Catholic singer and theater actors, Edna and Rodolfo Herminigildo, born in Angono City, Philippines on June 3, 1994. Her family originally lived in Rizal, where Faith Anne studied at San Isidro Elementary School. Music was a real part of her early development; she used to join different programs in her school, but then later transferred to a different school because of some family business reasons. In 2010, at the age of six, she won as Little Miss ROES (Rosario Ocampo Elementary School); Taytay, Rizal that led to her being known before she had graduated elementary school. She later studied at Francisco P. Felix Memorial National High School, where she became known, not as a singer but as an active student in academic subjects. She graduated with honors in 2010 and pursued her childhood ambition to be a teacher – the reason why she chose to study for a Bachelor of Secondary Education, majoring English Cainta Catholic College where she is at present.
