= Sainte-Félicité =

Sainte-Félicité may refer to:

- Sainte-Félicité, Bas-Saint-Laurent, Quebec, a municipality in Quebec
- Sainte-Félicité, Chaudière-Appalaches, Quebec a municipality in Quebec

== See also ==
- Montagny-Sainte-Félicité, a village in France
