= Flicka, Ricka, Dicka =

Swedish children's book series

Flicka Ricka Dicka (in Swedish Rufsi, Tufsi, Tott) is the name of fictional triplets depicted in a series of children's books by author/illustrator Maj Lindman. The triplets, all girls with blond hair, live in Sweden and have light hearted misadventures. The series of books were first created in the 1920s in Sweden and then printed in English in the United States from the 1930s. Lindman also authored a series a books about three boys, Snipp, Snapp, Snurr along a similar theme. A 1936 New York Times review of the book Snipp Snapp Snurr and the Yellow Sled cited the Snipp, Snapp, Snurr series as "popular with the little children".

The series of books continued until about 1960. Some of Lindman's stories were included in a series of compilations called "The Best of Children's Books".

== Books (incomplete) ==
- Flicka Ricka Dicka and Their New Skates
- Flicka Ricka Dicka and the Three Kittens
- Flicka Ricka Dicka and the New Dotted Dresses
- Flicka Ricka Dicka Bake a Cake
- Flicka Ricka Dicka and the Little Dog
- Flicka Ricka Dicka and the Strawberries
- Flicka Ricka Dicka Go to Market
- Flicka Ricka Dicka and the Big Red Hen
- Flicka Ricka Dicka and Their New Friend
- Flicka Ricka Dicka and the Girl Next Door

== See also ==
- Moomin
