= Felicia (ferret) =

Ferret (died 1972)

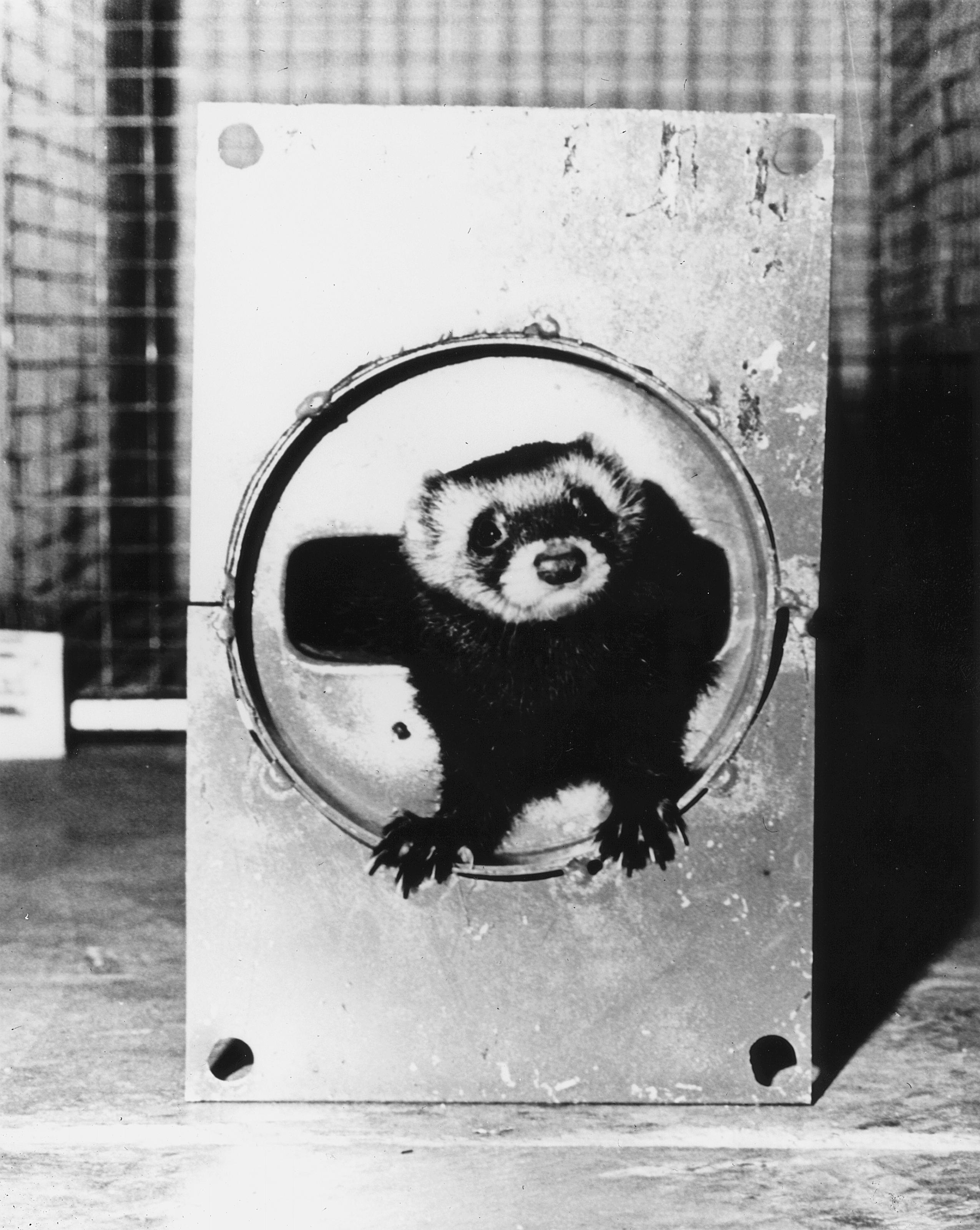
- Felicia after cleaning a vacuum pipe c. 1972
- Species: Ferret
- Sex: Female
- Born: Gaylord, Minnesota, United States
- Died: May 9th, 1972; Illinois, United States
- Employer: Fermilab
- Notable role: Cleaning vacuum pipes
- Years active: 1971–1972
- Owner: Walter Pelczarski

Felicia was an American ferret briefly used to clean narrow pipes in Fermilab, then known as the National Accelerator Laboratory, during the 1970s.

== Biography ==
In the 1960s and 1970s, scientists at the National Accelerator Laboratory adjacent to Batavia, Illinois in the United States designed a particle accelerator known as the Main Ring. A large ring of narrow tubing, 4 mi (6.4 km) in circumference, was necessary to its function. However, small pieces of debris littered the narrow tube. Scientists had difficulty finding out how to clean the tubing.

In 1971, Robert Sheldon, a scientist visiting from Britain, suggested that they use a ferret. He knew that poachers sent ferrets into narrow tunnels in Yorkshire to hunt for rabbits. The NAL purchased Felicia from a farm in Gaylord, Minnesota. They chose Felicia for her small size in comparison to other ferrets; she was 15 in (38 cm) long. Scientists trained her to scamper through increasingly long tubes so she could work in the particle accelerator. They placed a diaper and a collar with a long string on her, then had her go through the tube. When she emerged from the other end, they attached a cleaning swab to the string and pulled it through, clearing the tube of debris. Staff incentivized her with raw meat and fish. Walter Pelczarski, the mechanical designer of the lab who was in charge of Felicia, said that ferrets' natural curiosity made Felicia ideal for the job.

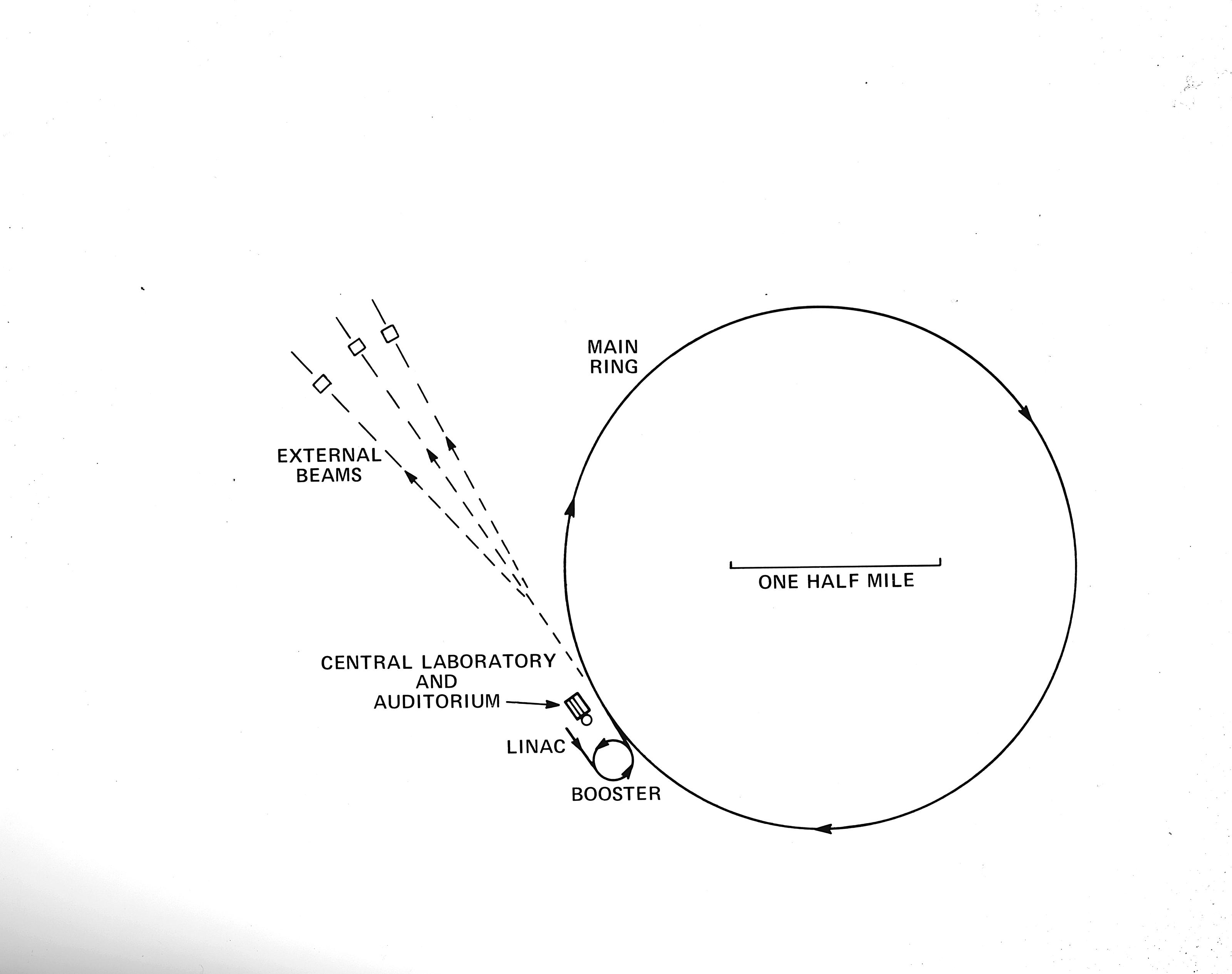
Schematic of the particle accelerator c. 1973

Felicia refused to actually enter the Main Ring after her period of training, so she was assigned to shorter, straight lengths of tube in the NAL's Meson Lab. Engineer Hans Kautzky designed a magnet attached to a steel cable to clean the circular Main Ring accelerator, which was dubbed a "magnetic ferret." The Main Ring was officially closed in 1997, making way for Fermilab's Main Injector.

Local media learned about Felicia, and she featured in contemporary news stories and radio shows about the NAL. One writer for the Chicago Sun Times described her as an "atomic age pipe cleaner" in 1971.

Felicia retired after a dozen runs in the Meson Lab. She spent much of her time either at a nearby mink farm or as a pet in the homes of NAL staffers. She died on May 9, 1972, of a ruptured intestinal abscess. Although a local newspaper, The Village Crier, reported plans to taxidermy her body, Felicia's final resting place is not known.
