= Felicita Pauļuka =

Latvian artist (1925–2014)

- Felicita Pauļuka
- Born: May 8, 1925; Riga, Latvia
- Died: 8 December 2014 (aged 89); Riga, Latvia
- Known for: Painting, Pastel art, Illustration

Felicita Pauļuka (May 8, 1925 – December 8, 2014) was a Latvian painter of Baltic German origin noted for her portraits, nudes, and book illustrations. In the second half of the 20th century, Pauļuka was attributed to the development of Latvian pastel painting traditions.

== Biography ==
Pauļuka was born Felicita Jānke (German: Jahnke) on May 8, 1925 in Riga, Latvia, to a family of German origin.

At age 15, Pauļuka was the youngest student enrolled in the Art Academy of Latvia. After quitting her studies for four years due to World War II, she resumed her education in 1944 and worked as an illustrator and cartoonist in the newspaper Cīņa. In 1949, she graduated with distinction in portrait painting from the Art Academy of Latvia led by Ģederts Eliass and Leo Svemps. Her work towards a diploma included a monumental figurative composition in oil titled Vecāķu Fishermen (1949).

She participated in exhibitions from 1950, and in 1956, she became a member of the Artists Union of Latvia.

From 1943 to 1960, she was married to the Latvian painter Jānis Pauļuks, whom she met before World War II at the Art Academy of Latvia. They lived together for less than ten years until the beginning of the 1950s. She was also his muse and model.

From 1961 to 1980, her spouse was the Ukrainian graphic artist Sergejs Adamovičs.

== Art ==
Pauļuka was a prominent representative of portrait and nude painting in Latvian art. She painted with oil and pastels and drew expressive drawings in charcoal. Her charcoal and sanguine drawings are considered classic examples of Latvian art.

In the 1950s and 1960s, she gained recognition in graphics and book art, developing her own style for the illustration of children's literature. Pauļuka also collaborated with the magazines Draugs and Zīlīte.

In the 1960s, Pauļuka worked on a series of portraits of Latvian cultural workers. She also interpreted the external forms, characters and peculiarities of popular artists, writers, and actors.
