= Felicia Kornbluh =

American scholar and writer

Dr. Felicia Kornbluh
- Born: Felicia Kornbluh; March 31, 1966 (age 60); Manhattan, New York, U.S.
- Education: Harvard-Radcliffe College, Princeton University
- Occupations: American scholar, writer, feminist activist and Professor
- Spouse: M. Anore Horton
- Relatives: Karen Kornbluh (sister); Dr. Rebecca Kornbluh (sister); Beatrice Cogan Braun (Parent); David Kornbluh (Parent)
- Writing career
- Language: English

Felicia Kornbluh (born March 31, 1966) is an American scholar, writer, and feminist activist and Professor of History and of Gender, Sexuality, and Women's Studies at the University of Vermont.

== Biography ==
Kornbluh was born in Manhattan, New York City. While in High School, Kornbluh was a reporter for and, ultimately, Senior Editor, of Children's Express, the national youth journalism and advocacy organization, which was nominated for a Pulitzer Prize for Commentary in 1982. Her work for Children's Express appeared in newspapers across the country. She reported from Cambodia in 1980. She was among the first Western journalists to enter the country following the Vietnamese incursion late in 1979. She also reported from Japan, including from Hiroshima, and from the Soviet Union, on children's status and their views of the nuclear threat.

While attending Harvard-Radcliffe College, and then again after graduating, Kornbluh served on the staff of the U.S. House of Representatives Select Committee on Children, Youth and Families, chaired by Rep. George Miller (D-CA). She participated in the Committee's effort to pass legislation that would vastly expand the nation's system of child care. While in college, she co-founded the political opinion journal in college, Subterranean Review. She also wrote for the Harvard Crimson. After college, Kornbluh returned to the Select Committee and, later worked on the Changing Priorities Project of the Institute for Policy Studies.

== Career ==
Kornbluh is the author of The Battle for Welfare Rights (University of Pennsylvania, 2007), which chronicles the history of the National Welfare Rights Organization, a membership organization of low-income people, especially women of color. Kornbluh served for five years as Director of the Gender, Sexuality, and Women's Studies Program at the University of Vermont. She led a renaming of the program and a reform of the curriculum that led to the inclusion of sexuality and gender identity studies. She collaborated with a wide range of university and community partners on public educational events on the subjects of same-sex marriage; women's electoral participation; family policy; gender and precarity; and the intersections among race, gender, and sexuality. She also served as President of United Academics, AFT/AAUP, the UVM faculty union, and as a member of the state leadership of the American Federation of Teachers union, and as an advisor to and member of the Vermont Commission on Women, a non-partisan state agency that works to advance rights and opportunities for women and girls. She cofounded the activist network Historians for Social Justice, Speaking Out: Activism and Protest in the 1960s and 1970s. From 1995 to 2005, she participated actively in the Women's Committee of 100, a feminist mobilization for welfare justice.

She has served on the advisory board of the activist organization Rights and Democracy since its founding in 2016.

She is a co-author, with political scientist Gwendolyn Mink, of the forthcoming Ensuring Poverty: The History and Politics of Welfare Reform. Before training as a historian, she was an advocate for women and children, and a freelance writer. Kornbluh is a graduate of the Emerge Vermont training program for Democratic women and a frequent commentator on Vermont and national media.

== Selected works ==
Kornbluh has written numerous articles in academic and non-academic journals on the subjects of poverty, social welfare, activism, disability, LGBT history, and women's rights. Her writing appears in:

- "Tales Out of School", The Nation, 246/12, March 26, 1988 (special issue on student politics), pp. 435–6;
- "The Goals of the Welfare Rights Movement: Why We Need Them Thirty Years Later", Feminist Studies, 24/1 (Spring 1998), pp. 65–78.
- "Redirect the Rebate", Los Angeles Times Sunday Op-Ed, July 8, 2001 (co-authored with Karen Kornbluh).
- An Ugly Saga of Everywoman", Los Angeles Times Book Review, September 23, 1990. (review of Now You Know, by Kitty Dukakis with Jane Scovell),
- "Divided We Stand", Women's Review of Books, January/February 2013 (review of All in the Family: The Realignment of American Democracy Since the 1960s by Robert Self)
- "Disability, Anti-Professionalism, and Civil Rights: The Blind and the 'Right to Organize' in the 1950s", Journal of American History, 97/4 (March 2011), pp. 1023–1047.
- "Class Dismissed! Welfare Recipients Fight to Stay in College", In These Times October 5, 1997, cover, pp. 18–20.
- "Welfare and the Women's Vanguard", In These Times 20/2 (December 11, 1995), pp. 39–40.
