= Expert =

Person with broad and profound competence in a particular field

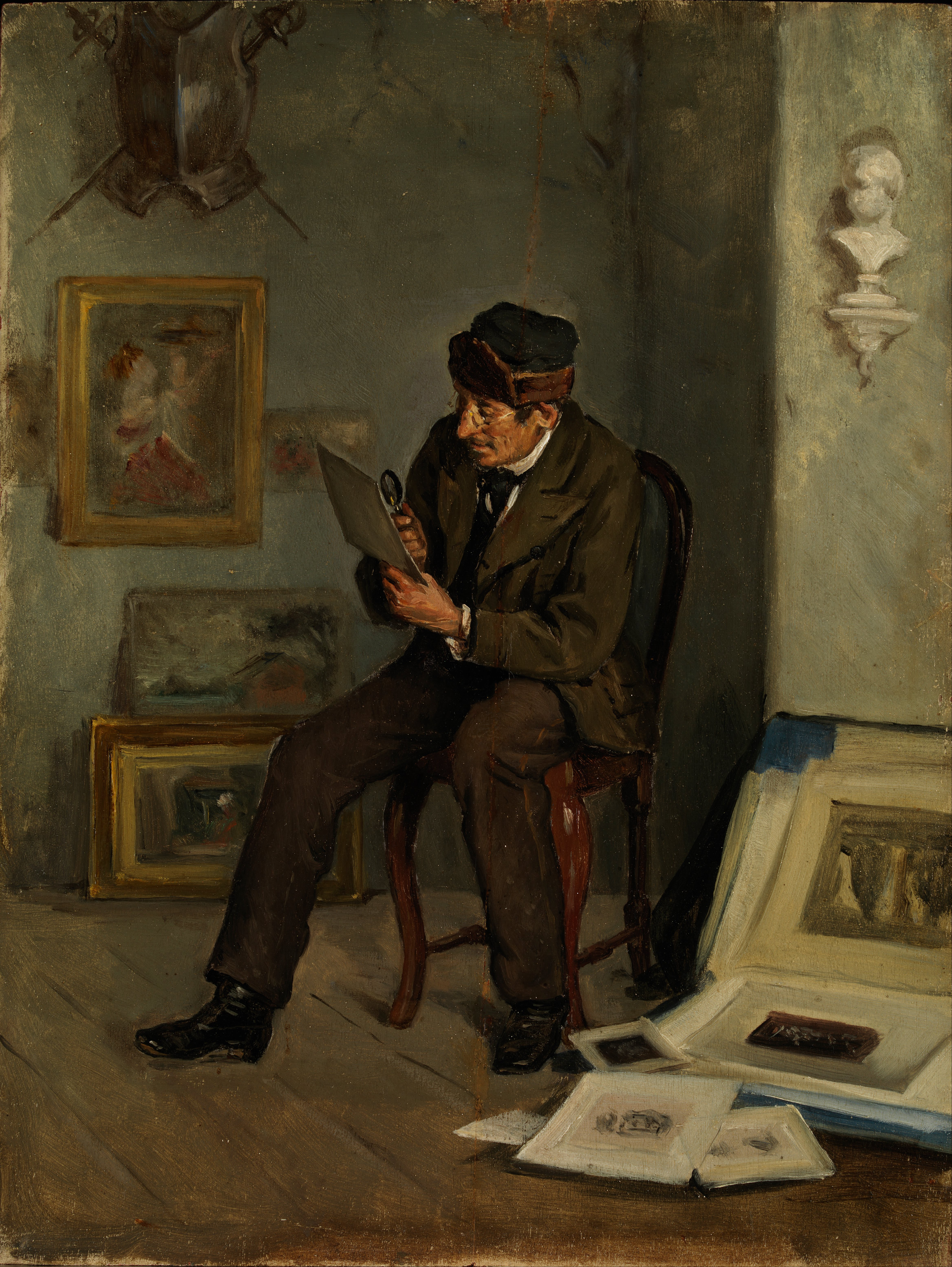
Adolf von Becker: The Art Expert

An expert is somebody who has a broad and deep understanding and competence in terms of knowledge, skill, and experience in a particular field or area of study, derived from both practice and education. Informally, an expert is someone widely recognized as a reliable source of technique or skill whose faculty for judging or deciding rightly, justly, or wisely is accorded authority and status by peers or the public in a specific well-distinguished domain. An expert, more generally, is a person with extensive knowledge or ability based on research, experience, or occupation and in a particular area of study. Experts are called in for advice on their respective subject, but they do not always agree on the particulars of a field of study. An expert can be believed, by virtue of credentials, training, education, profession, publication or experience, to have special knowledge of a subject beyond that of the average person, sufficient that others may officially (and legally) rely upon the individual's opinion on that topic. Historically, an expert was referred to as a sage. The individual was usually a profound thinker distinguished for wisdom and sound judgment.

In specific fields, the definition of expert is well established by consensus and therefore it is not always necessary for individuals to have a professional or academic qualification for them to be accepted as an expert. In this respect, a shepherd with fifty years of experience tending flocks would be widely recognized as having complete expertise in the use and training of sheep dogs and the care of sheep.

Research in this area attempts to understand the relation between expert knowledge, skills and personal characteristics and exceptional performance. Some researchers have investigated the cognitive structures and processes of experts. The fundamental aim of this research is to describe what it is that experts know and how they use their knowledge to achieve performance that most people assume requires extreme or extraordinary ability. Studies have investigated the factors that enable experts to be fast and accurate.

== Expertise ==
Expertise characteristics, skills and knowledge of a person (that is, expert) or of a system, which distinguish experts from novices and less experienced people. In many domains there are objective measures of performance capable of distinguishing experts from novices: expert chess players will almost always win games against recreational chess players; expert medical specialists are more likely to diagnose a disease correctly; etc.

The word expertise is used to refer also to expert determination, where an expert is invited to decide a disputed issue. The decision may be binding or advisory, according to the agreement between the parties in dispute.

=== Academic views ===
There are two academic approaches to the understanding and study of expertise. The first understands expertise as an emergent property of communities of practice. In this view expertise is socially constructed; tools for thinking and scripts for action are jointly constructed within social groups enabling that group jointly to define and acquire expertise in some domain.

In the second view, expertise is a characteristic of individuals and is a consequence of the human capacity for extensive adaptation to physical and social environments. Many accounts of the development of expertise emphasize that it comes about through long periods of deliberate practice. In many domains of expertise estimates of 10 years' experience deliberate practice are common. Recent research on expertise emphasizes the nurture side of the nature and nurture argument. Some factors not fitting the nature-nurture dichotomy are biological but not genetic, such as starting age, handedness, and season of birth.

In the field of education there is a potential "expert blind spot" (see also Dunning–Kruger effect) in newly practicing educators who are experts in their content area. This is based on the "expert blind spot hypothesis" researched by Mitchell Nathan and Andrew Petrosino. Newly practicing educators with advanced subject-area expertise of an educational content area tend to use the formalities and analysis methods of their particular area of expertise as a major guiding factor of student instruction and knowledge development, rather than being guided by student learning and developmental needs that are prevalent among novice learners.

The blind spot metaphor refers to the physiological blind spot in human vision in which perceptions of surroundings and circumstances are strongly impacted by their expectations. Beginning practicing educators tend to overlook the importance of novice levels of prior knowledge and other factors involved in adjusting and adapting pedagogy for learner understanding. This expert blind spot is in part due to an assumption that novices' cognitive schemata are less elaborate, interconnected, and accessible than experts' and that their pedagogical reasoning skills are less well developed. Essential knowledge of subject matter for practicing educators consists of overlapping knowledge domains: subject matter knowledge and pedagogical content matter. Pedagogical content matter consists of an understanding of how to represent certain concepts in ways appropriate to the learner contexts, including abilities and interests. The expert blind spot is a pedagogical phenomenon that is typically overcome through educators' experience with instructing learners over time.

=== Historical views ===
In line with the socially constructed view of expertise, expertise can also be understood as a form of power; that is, experts have the ability to influence others as a result of their defined social status. By a similar token, a fear of experts can arise from fear of an intellectual elite's power. In earlier periods of history, simply being able to read made one part of an intellectual elite. The introduction of the printing press in Europe during the fifteenth century and the diffusion of printed matter contributed to higher literacy rates and wider access to the once-rarefied knowledge of academia. The subsequent spread of education and learning changed society, and initiated an era of widespread education whose elite would now instead be those who produced the written content itself for consumption, in education and all other spheres.

Plato's "Noble Lie", concerns expertise. Plato did not believe most people were clever enough to look after their own and society's best interest, so the few clever people of the world needed to lead the rest of the flock. Therefore, the idea was born that only the elite should know the truth in its complete form and the rulers, Plato said, must tell the people of the city "the noble lie" to keep them passive and content, without the risk of upheaval and unrest.

In contemporary society, doctors and scientists, for example, are considered to be experts in that they hold a body of dominant knowledge that is, on the whole, inaccessible to the layman. However, this inaccessibility and perhaps even mystery that surrounds expertise does not cause the layman to disregard the opinion of the experts on account of the unknown. Instead, the complete opposite occurs whereby members of the public believe in and highly value the opinion of medical professionals or of scientific discoveries, despite not understanding it.

=== Related research ===
A number of computational models have been developed in cognitive science to explain the development from novice to expert. In particular, Herbert A. Simon and Kevin Gilmartin proposed a model of learning in chess called MAPP (Memory-Aided Pattern Recognizer). Based on simulations, they estimated that about 50,000 chunks (units of memory) are necessary to become an expert, and hence the many years needed to reach this level. More recently, the CHREST model (Chunk Hierarchy and REtrieval STructures) has simulated in detail a number of phenomena in chess expertise (eye movements, performance in a variety of memory tasks, development from novice to expert) and in other domains.

An important feature of expert performance seems to be the way in which experts are able to rapidly retrieve complex configurations of information from long-term memory. They recognize situations because they have meaning. It is perhaps this central concern with meaning and how it attaches to situations which provides an important link between the individual and social approaches to the development of expertise. Work on "Skilled Memory and Expertise" by Anders Ericsson and James J. Staszewski confronts the paradox of expertise and claims that people not only acquire content knowledge as they practice cognitive skills, they also develop mechanisms that enable them to use a large and familiar knowledge base efficiently.

Work on expert systems (computer software designed to provide an answer to a problem, or clarify uncertainties where normally one or more human experts would need to be consulted) typically is grounded on the premise that expertise is based on acquired repertoires of rules and frameworks for decision making which can be elicited as the basis for computer supported judgment and decision-making. However, there is increasing evidence that expertise does not work in this fashion. Rather, experts recognize situations based on experience of many prior situations. They are in consequence able to make rapid decisions in complex and dynamic situations.

In a critique of the expert systems literature, Dreyfus & Dreyfus suggest:

If one asks an expert for the rules he or she is using, one will, in effect, force the expert to regress to the level of a beginner and state the rules learned in school. Thus, instead of using rules he or she no longer remembers, as the knowledge engineers suppose, the expert is forced to remember rules he or she no longer uses. ... No amount of rules and facts can capture the knowledge an expert has when he or she has stored experience of the actual outcomes of tens of thousands of situations.

==== Skilled memory theory ====
The role of long-term memory in the skilled memory effect was first articulated by Chase and Simon in their classic studies of chess expertise. They asserted that organized patterns of information stored in long-term memory (chunks) mediated experts' rapid encoding and superior retention. Their study revealed that all subjects retrieved about the same number of chunks, but the size of the chunks varied with subjects' prior experience. Experts' chunks contained more individual pieces than those of novices. This research did not investigate how experts find, distinguish, and retrieve the right chunks from the vast number they hold without a lengthy search of long-term memory.

Skilled memory enables experts to rapidly encode, store, and retrieve information within the domain of their expertise and thereby circumvent the capacity limitations that typically constrain novice performance. For example, it explains experts' ability to recall large amounts of material displayed for only brief study intervals, provided that the material comes from their domain of expertise. When unfamiliar material (not from their domain of expertise) is presented to experts, their recall is no better than that of novices.

The first principle of skilled memory, the meaningful encoding principle, states that experts exploit prior knowledge to durably encode information needed to perform a familiar task successfully. Experts form more elaborate and accessible memory representations than novices. The elaborate semantic memory network creates meaningful memory codes that create multiple potential cues and avenues for retrieval.

The second principle, the retrieval structure principle states that experts develop memory mechanisms called retrieval structures to facilitate the retrieval of information stored in long-term memory. These mechanisms operate in a fashion consistent with the meaningful encoding principle to provide cues that can later be regenerated to retrieve the stored information efficiently without a lengthy search.

The third principle, the speed up principle states that long-term memory encoding and retrieval operations speed up with practice, so that their speed and accuracy approach the speed and accuracy of short-term memory storage and retrieval.

Examples of skilled memory research described in the Ericsson and Stasewski study include:

- a waiter who can accurately remember up to 20 complete dinner orders in an actual restaurant setting by using mnemonic strategy, patterns, and spatial relations (position of the person ordering). At the time of recall all items of a category (e.g., all salad dressings, then all meat temperatures, then all steak types, then all starch type) would be recalled in clockwise for all customers.
- a running enthusiast who grouped together short random sequences of digits and encoded the groups in terms of their meaning as running times, dates, and ages. He was thus able to recall over 84% of all digit groups presented in a session totaling 200–300 digits. His expertise was limited to digits; when a switch from digits to letters of the alphabet was made he exhibited no transfer—his memory span dropped back to about six consonants.
- math enthusiasts who can in less than 25 seconds mentally solve 2 × 5 digit multiplication problems (e.g., 23 × 48,856) that have been presented orally by the researcher.

==== In problem solving ====
Much of the research regarding expertise involves the studies of how experts and novices differ in solving problems. Mathematics and physics are common domains for these studies.

One of the most cited works in this area examines how experts (PhD students in physics) and novices (undergraduate students that completed one semester of mechanics) categorize and represent physics problems. They found that novices sort problems into categories based upon surface features (e.g., keywords in the problem statement or visual configurations of the objects depicted). Experts, however, categorize problems based upon their deep structures (i.e., the main physics principle used to solve the problem).

Their findings also suggest that while the schemas of both novices and experts are activated by the same features of a problem statement, the experts' schemas contain more procedural knowledge which aid in determining which principle to apply, and novices' schemas contain mostly declarative knowledge which do not aid in determining methods for solution.

==== Germain's scale ====
Relative to a specific field, an expert has:

- Specific education, training, and knowledge
- Required qualifications
- Ability to assess importance in work-related situations
- Capability to improve themselves
- Intuition
- Self-assurance and confidence in their knowledge

Marie-Line Germain developed a psychometric measure of perception of employee expertise called the Generalized Expertise Measure. She defined a behavioral dimension in experts, in addition to the dimensions suggested by Swanson and Holton. Her 16-item scale contains objective expertise items and subjective expertise items. Objective items were named Evidence-Based items. Subjective items (the remaining 11 items from the measure below) were named Self-Enhancement items because of their behavioral component.

- This person has knowledge specific to a field of work.
- This person shows they have the education necessary to be an expert in the field.
- This person has the qualifications required to be an expert in the field.
- This person has been trained in their area of expertise.
- This person is ambitious about their work in the company.
- This person can assess whether a work-related situation is important or not.
- This person is capable of improving themselves.
- This person is charismatic.
- This person can deduce things from work-related situations easily.
- This person is intuitive in the job.
- This person is able to judge what things are important in their job.
- This person has the drive to become what they are capable of becoming in their field.
- This person is self-assured.
- This person has self-confidence.
- This person is outgoing.

== Rhetoric ==
Scholars in rhetoric have also turned their attention to the concept of the expert. Considered an appeal to ethos or "the personal character of the speaker", established expertise allows a speaker to make statements regarding special topics of which the audience may be ignorant. In other words, the expert enjoys the deference of the audience's judgment and can appeal to authority where a non-expert cannot.

In The Rhetoric of Expertise, E. Johanna Hartelius defines two basic modes of expertise: autonomous and attributed expertise. While an autonomous expert can "possess expert knowledge without recognition from other people," attributed expertise is "a performance that may or may not indicate genuine knowledge." With these two categories, Hartelius isolates the rhetorical problems faced by experts: just as someone with autonomous expertise may not possess the skill to persuade people to hold their points of view, someone with merely attributed expertise may be persuasive but lack the actual knowledge pertaining to a given subject. The problem faced by audiences follows from the problem facing experts: when faced with competing claims of expertise, what resources do non-experts have to evaluate claims put before them?

=== Dialogic expertise ===
Hartelius and other scholars have also noted the challenges that projects such as Wikipedia pose to how experts have traditionally constructed their authority. In "Wikipedia and the Emergence of Dialogic Expertise", she highlights Wikipedia as an example of the "dialogic expertise" made possible by collaborative digital spaces. Predicated upon the notion that "truth emerges from dialogue", Wikipedia challenges traditional expertise both because anyone can edit it and because no single person, regardless of their credentials, can end a discussion by fiat. In other words, the community, rather than single individuals, direct the course of discussion. The production of knowledge, then, as a process of dialogue and argumentation, becomes an inherently rhetorical activity.

Hartelius calls attention to two competing norm systems of expertise: "network norms of dialogic collaboration" and "deferential norms of socially sanctioned professionalism"; Wikipedia being evidence of the first. Drawing on a Bakhtinian framework, Hartelius posits that Wikipedia is an example of an epistemic network that is driven by the view that individuals' ideas clash with one another so as to generate expertise collaboratively. Hartelius compares Wikipedia's methodology of open-ended discussions of topics to that of Bakhtin's theory of speech communication, where genuine dialogue is considered a live event, which is continuously open to new additions and participants. Hartelius acknowledges that knowledge, experience, training, skill, and qualification are important dimensions of expertise but posits that the concept is more complex than sociologists and psychologists suggest. Arguing that expertise is rhetorical, then, Hartelius explains that expertise "is not simply about one person's skills being different from another's. It is also fundamentally contingent on a struggle for ownership and legitimacy." Effective communication is an inherent element in expertise in the same style as knowledge is. Rather than leaving each other out, substance and communicative style are complementary. Hartelius further suggests that Wikipedia's dialogic construction of expertise illustrates both the instrumental and the constitutive dimensions of rhetoric; instrumentally as it challenges traditional encyclopedias and constitutively as a function of its knowledge production. Going over the historical development of the encyclopedic project, Hartelius argues that changes in traditional encyclopedias have led to changes in traditional expertise. Wikipedia's use of hyperlinks to connect one topic to another depends on, and develops, electronic interactivity meaning that Wikipedia's way of knowing is dialogic. Dialogic expertise then, emerges from multiple interactions between utterances within the discourse community. The ongoing dialogue between contributors on Wikipedia not only results in the emergence of truth; it also explicates the topics one can be an expert of. As Hartelius explains, "the very act of presenting information about topics that are not included in traditional encyclopedias is a construction of new expertise." While Wikipedia insists that contributors must only publish preexisting knowledge, the dynamics behind dialogic expertise creates new information nonetheless. Knowledge production is created as a function of dialogue. According to Hartelius, dialogic expertise has emerged on Wikipedia not only because of its interactive structure but also because of the site's hortative discourse which is not found in traditional encyclopedias. By Wikipedia's hortative discourse, Hartelius means various encouragements to edit certain topics and instructions on how to do so that appear on the site. One further reason to the emergence of dialogic expertise on Wikipedia is the site's community pages, which function as a techne; explicating Wikipedia's expert methodology.

=== Networked expertise ===
Building on Hartelius, Damien Pfister developed the concept of "networked expertise". Noting that Wikipedia employs a "many to many" rather than a "one to one" model of communication, he notes how expertise likewise shifts to become a quality of a group rather than an individual. With the information traditionally associated with individual experts now stored within a text produced by a collective, knowing about something is less important than knowing how to find something. As he puts it, "With the internet, the historical power of subject matter expertise is eroded: the archival nature of the Web means that what and how to information is readily available." The rhetorical authority previously afforded to subject matter expertise, then, is given to those with the procedural knowledge of how to find information called for by a situation.

== Contrasts and comparisons ==
=== Associated terms ===
An expert differs from the specialist in that a specialist has to be able to solve a problem and an expert has to know its solution. The opposite of an expert is generally known as a layperson, while someone who occupies a middle grade of understanding is generally known as a technician and often employed to assist experts. A person may well be an expert in one field and a layperson in many other fields. The concepts of experts and expertise are debated within the field of epistemology under the general heading of expert knowledge. In contrast, the opposite of a specialist would be a generalist or polymath.

The term is widely used informally, with people being described as 'experts' in order to bolster the relative value of their opinion, when no objective criteria for their expertise is available. The term crank is likewise used to disparage opinions. Academic elitism arises when experts become convinced that only their opinion is useful, sometimes on matters beyond their personal expertise.

In contrast to an expert, a novice (known colloquially as a newbie or 'greenhorn') is any person that is new to any science or field of study or activity or social cause and who is undergoing training in order to meet normal requirements of being regarded a mature and equal participant.

"Expert" is also being mistakenly interchanged with the term "authority" in new media. An expert can be an authority if through relationships to people and technology, that expert is allowed to control access to his expertise. However, a person who merely wields authority is not by right an expert. In new media, users are being misled by the term "authority". Many sites and search engines such as Google and Technorati use the term "authority" to denote the link value and traffic to a particular topic. However, this authority only measures populist information. It in no way assures that the author of that site or blog is an expert.

An expert is not to be confused with a professional.A professional is someone who gets paid to do something. An amateur is the opposite of a professional, not the opposite of an expert.

=== Developmental characteristics ===
Some characteristics of the development of an expert have been found to include

- A characterization of this practice as "deliberate practice", which forces the practitioner to come up with new ways to encourage and enable themselves to reach new levels of performance.
- An early phase of learning which is characterized by enjoyment, excitement, and participation without outcome-related goals.
- The ability to rearrange or construct a higher dimension of creativity. Due to such familiarity or advanced knowledge experts can develop more abstract perspectives of their concepts or performances.

== Use in literature ==
Mark Twain defined an expert as "an ordinary fellow from another town". Will Rogers described an expert as "A man fifty miles from home with a briefcase." Danish scientist and Nobel laureate Niels Bohr defined an expert as "A person that has made every possible mistake within his or her field." Canadian writer Malcolm Gladwell describes expertise as a matter of practicing the correct way for a total of around 10,000 hours.

== See also ==
- Perceptual learning – Process of learning better perception skills
- Consultant – Professional who provides advice in their specific field of expertise
- Polymath – Gifted person with broad knowledge

=== General ===
- Scholar – Person who pursues academic and intellectual activities
- Know-how – Knowledge of how to perform a task
- Skill – Ability to carry out a task
- Competence – Ability of a person to do a job properly
- Technocracy – Form of government ruled by experts
- Tutor expertise in adult education

=== Criticism ===
- Academic bias – Bias of scholars allowing their beliefs to shape their research
- Anti-intellectualism – Hostility to and mistrust of education, philosophy, art, literature, and science
- Denialism – Rejecting scientific or historical consensus
- The Death of Expertise – 2017 nonfiction book by Tom Nichols
- Gibson's law – Every PhD has an equal and opposite PhD
- Politicization of science – Use of science for political purposes
- Rational skepticism – Questioning of claims lacking empirical evidence

=== Psychology ===
- Dreyfus model of skill acquisition – Model of learning
- Dunning–Kruger effect – Cognitive bias about one's own skill
- Pygmalion effect – Phenomenon in psychology

== Bibliography ==
- Aristotle (2001). "Rhetoric". In McKeon, Richard (ed.). The Basic Works of Aristotle. Translated by Roberts, W. Rhys. New York: Modern Library. ISBN 0-375-75799-6.
- Borko, Hilda; Eisenhart, Margaret; Brown, Catherine A.; Underhill, Robert G.; Jones, Doug; Agard, Patricia C. (1992). "Learning to Teach Hard Mathematics: Do Novice Teachers and Their Instructors Give up Too Easily?" (PDF). Journal for Research in Mathematics Education. 23 (3). National Council of Teachers of Mathematics: 194–222. doi:10.5951/jresematheduc.23.3.0194. ISSN 0021-8251.
- Borko, Hilda; Livingston, Carol (1989). "Cognition and Improvisation: Differences in Mathematics Instruction by Expert and Novice Teachers". American Educational Research Journal. Winter 1989, Vol. 26, No. 4 (4): 473–498. doi:10.3102/00028312026004473. JSTOR 1162861. S2CID 145280199.
- Chase, W.G.; Simon, Herbert A. (1973a). "The mind's eye in chess". In W.G. Chase (ed.). Visual information processing. New York: Academic Press. ISBN 978-0-12-170150-5.
- Chase, W.G.; Simon, Herbert A. (1973b). "Perception in chess". Cognitive Psychology. 4: 55–81. doi:10.1016/0010-0285(73)90004-2.
- Chi, M. T.; Feltovich, P. J.; Glaser, R. (1981). "Categorization and representation of physics problems by experts and novices". Cognitive Science. 5 (2): 121–152. doi:10.1207/s15516709cog0502_2.
- Chi, M. T. H.; Glasser, R.; Rees, E. (1982). "Expertise in problem solving". In Sternberg, R. J. (ed.). Advances in the psychology of human intelligence. Vol. 1. Hillsdale, NJ: Erlbaum. pp. 7–75.
- Collins, R. (1979). The Credential Society
- Coughlan, Robert (1954-09-06). "Dr. Edward Teller's Magnificent Obsession". Life Magazine. Quoted by Dr Edward Teller.
- "Definition of EXPERT". Merriam Webster Online.
- Dewey, J. (1927). The Public and its Problems
- Dreyfus, H.; Dreyfus, S. (2005). "Expertise in real world contexts" (PDF). Organization Studies. 26 (5): 779–792. doi:10.1177/0170840605053102. S2CID 145718063. Archived from the original (PDF) on 2017-09-22.
- Ericsson, K. A. (2000). Expert Performance and Deliberate Practice
- Ericsson, Anders K.; Charness, Neil; Feltovich, Paul; Hoffman, Robert R. (2006). Cambridge handbook on expertise and expert performance. Cambridge, UK: Cambridge University Press. ISBN 978-0-521-60081-1.
- Ericsson, Anders K.; Prietula, Michael J.; Cokely, Edward T. (2007). "The Making of an Expert". Harvard Business Review. 85 (July–August 2007): 114–21, 193. PMID 17642130.
- Ericsson, Anders K.; Stasewski, James J. (1989). "Chapter 9: Skilled Memory and Expertise: Mechanisms of Exceptional Performance". In David Klahr; Kenneth Kotovsky (eds.). Complex Information Processing: The Impact of Herbert A. Simon. Hillesdale N.J.: Lawrence Erlbaum Associates.
- Fuller, Steve (2005). The Intellectual. Icon Books. p. 141. ISBN 978-1-84046-721-5.
- Germain, M.-L. (2005). Apperception and self-identification of managerial and subordinate expertise. Academy of Human Resource Development. Estes Park, CO. February 24–27.
- Germain, M.-L. (2006a), Development and preliminary validation of a psychometric measure of expertise: The Generalized Expertise Measure (GEM) (Unpublished Doctoral Dissertation), Florida: Barry University
- Germain, M.-L. (2006b). Perception of Instructors' Expertise by College Students: An Exploratory Qualitative Research Study. American Educational Research Association annual conference, San Francisco, CA. April 7–11.
- Germain, M.-L. (2006c). What experts are not: Factors identified by managers as disqualifiers for selecting subordinates for expert team membership. Academy of Human Resource Development Conference. Columbus, OH. February 22–26.
- Germain, M.-L. (2009). The impact of perceived administrators' expertise on subordinates' job satisfaction and turnover intention. Academy of Human Resource Development. Arlington, VA. February 18–22.
- Germain, M.-L., & Tejeda, M. J. (2012). A preliminary exploration on the measurement of expertise: An initial development of a psychometric scale. Human Resource Development Quarterly, 23, no. 2, 203–232. doi:10.1002/hrdq.21134.
- Gibbons, M. (1994). Visual information processing. London: SAGE Publications. ISBN 978-0-8039-7794-5.
- Gobet, Fernand (2008). "The role of deliberate practice in expertise: Necessary but not sufficient". bura.brunel.ac.uk.
- Gobet, F.; Campitelli, G. (2007). "The role of domain-specific practice, handedness and starting age in chess" (PDF). Developmental Psychology. 43 (1): 159–172. doi:10.1037/0012-1649.43.1.159. PMID 17201516.
- Gobet, F.; Chassy, P. (2008). "Season of birth and chess expertise" (PDF). Journal of Biosocial Science. 40 (2): 313–316. doi:10.1017/S0021932007002222. PMID 18335581. S2CID 10033606. Archived from the original (PDF) on 2011-07-18.
- Gobet, F. (2015). Understanding expertise: A multi-disciplinary approach. London, UK: Palgrave/Macmilland. ISBN 978-0-230-27624-6.
- Gobet, F.; de Voogt, A. J.; Retschitzki, J. (2004). Moves in mind: The psychology of board games. Hove, UK: Psychology Press. ISBN 978-1-84169-336-1.
- Gobet, F.; Simon, Herbert A. (2000). "Five seconds or sixty? Presentation time in expert memory" (PDF). Cognitive Science. 24 (4): 651–682. doi:10.1207/s15516709cog2404_4. S2CID 10577260.
- Goldman, A. I. (1999). Knowledge in a Social World. Oxford: Oxford University Press.
- Hartelius, E. Johanna (2010-11-09). "Wikipedia and the Emergence of Dialogic Expertise". Southern Communication Journal. 75 (5). Informa UK Limited: 505–526. doi:10.1080/10417940903377169. ISSN 1041-794X. S2CID 144862927.
- Hartelius, E. Johanna (2011), The Rhetoric of Expertise, Lanham: Lexington
- Kitsikis, Dimitri, Le rôle des experts à la Conférence de la Paix. Gestation d'une technocratie en politique internationale. Ottawa, Editions de l'Université d'Ottawa, 1972, 227 pages.
- Mieg, Harald A. (2001). The social psychology of expertise. Mahwah, NJ: Lawrence Erlbaum Associates.
- Nathan, M.J.; Petrosino, A. (2003). "Expert Blind Spot Among Preservice Teachers" (PDF). American Educational Research Journal. Winter 2003, Vol. 40 (4): 905–928. doi:10.3102/00028312040004905. S2CID 145129059. Archived from the original (PDF) on 2015-04-24.
- Nettleton, S.; Burrows, R.; O'Malley, L. (2005). "The mundane realities of the everyday use of the internet for health, and their consequences for media convergence". Sociology of Health and Illness. 27 (7): 972–992. doi:10.1111/j.1467-9566.2005.00466.x. PMID 16313525.
- Pfister, Damien Smith (2011). "Networked Expertise in the Era of Many-to-many Communication: On Wikipedia and Invention". Social Epistemology. 25 (3). Informa UK Limited: 217–231. doi:10.1080/02691728.2011.578306. ISSN 0269-1728. S2CID 17067499.
- Shanteau, J.; Weiss, D.J.; Thomas, R.P.; Pounds, J.C. (2002). "Performance-based assessment of expertise: How to decide if someone is an expert or not". European Journal of Operational Research. 136 (2): 253–263. doi:10.1016/S0377-2217(01)00113-8.
- Simon, H. A.; Chase, W.G. (1973). "Skill in chess". American Scientist. 61 (4): 394–403. Bibcode:1973AmSci..61..394S.
- Simon, H. A.; Gilmartin, K. J. (1973). "A simulation of memory for chess positions". Cognitive Psychology. 5: 29–46. doi:10.1016/0010-0285(73)90024-8.
- Sowell, T. (1980). Knowledge and decisions. New York: Basic Books, Inc.
- Starkes, J.L.; Ericsson, K.A. (2003). Expert Performance in Sports: Advances in Research on Sport Expertise. Human Kinetics. ISBN 978-0-7360-4152-2.
- Swanson, Richard A.; Holton, Elwood F. III (2009). Foundations of human resource development (PDF). San Francisco: Berrett-Kohler Publishers. ISBN 978-1-57675-803-8. OCLC 489195461. Archived from the original (PDF) on 2021-01-26.
- Sweller, J.; Mawer, R. F.; Ward, M. R. (1983). "Development of expertise in mathematical problem solving". Journal of Experimental Psychology. 112 (4): 639–661. doi:10.1037/0096-3445.112.4.639.
- Tynjälä, Päivi (1999). "Towards expert knowledge? A comparison between a constructivist and a traditional learning environment in the university". International Journal of Educational Research. 31 (5): 357–442. doi:10.1016/S0883-0355(99)00012-9. S2CID 18750105.
