= Second impeachment of Donald Trump =

2021 US presidential impeachment

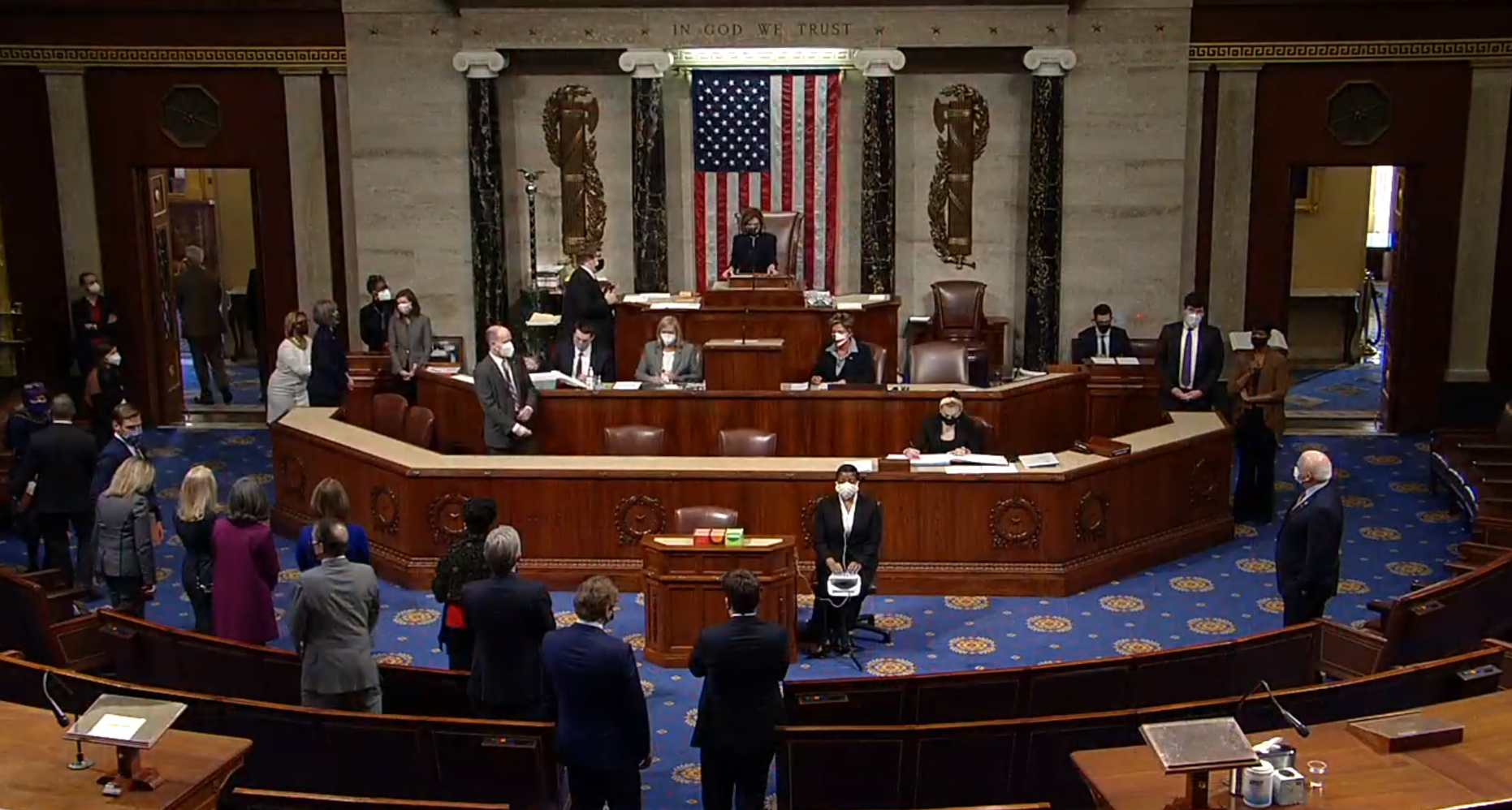
- The House of Representatives votes to adopt the article of impeachment.
- Accused: Donald Trump, 45th President of the United States
- Proponents: Nancy Pelosi (Speaker of the House of Representatives); Steny Hoyer (House Majority Leader); Jim Clyburn (House Majority Whip); Liz Cheney (Chair of the House Republican Conference)
- Date: January 13 – February 13, 2021 (1 month)
- Outcome: Acquitted by the U.S. Senate
- Charges: Incitement of insurrection
- Cause: Attempts to overturn the 2020 United States presidential election; Trump–Raffensperger phone call; January 6 United States Capitol attack

Congressional votes

Voting in the U.S. House of Representatives
- Accusation: Incitement of insurrection
- Votes in favor: 232
- Votes against: 197
- Present: 0
- Not voting: 4
- Result: Approved

Voting in the U.S. Senate
- Accusation: Incitement of insurrection
- Votes in favor: 57 "guilty"
- Votes against: 43 "not guilty"
- Result: Acquitted (67 "guilty" votes necessary for a conviction)

Donald Trump, serving as the 45th president of the United States, was impeached for the second time on January 13, 2021, one week before his term expired. On that date, the House of Representatives adopted one article of impeachment against Trump: incitement of insurrection. On February 13, 2021, the Senate voted to acquit Trump on the article of impeachment.

The House of Representatives of the 117th U.S. Congress adopted one article of impeachment against Trump of "incitement of insurrection", stating that he had incited the January 6 attack of the U.S. Capitol. The House impeachment managers formally triggered the start of the impeachment trial on January 25 by delivering to the Senate the charge against Trump. The trial in the Senate started on February 9. At the trial in the Senate, 57 senators voted "guilty", which was less than the two-thirds majority needed (67) to convict Trump, and 43 senators voted "not guilty", resulting in Trump being acquitted of the charges on February 13, 2021.

The trial was the first of its kind for a departed U.S. president: all other impeachment trials of presidents (those of Andrew Johnson, Bill Clinton, and Trump) occurred during their presidencies. Many Republican senators challenged the validity of holding an impeachment trial for a president no longer in office; proponents cited the Senate's 1876 trial of William W. Belknap, the secretary of war under President Ulysses S. Grant, who was impeached, but not convicted, after resigning from office immediately before a House vote on his impeachment.

This impeachment was the fourth impeachment of a U.S. president, and the second of Trump; his first impeachment was in December 2019.

In August 2023, Trump was twice indicted for the conduct at issue in his impeachment, once in Georgia and once federally. The federal charges were dismissed without prejudice in November 2024, due to the DOJ's policy of not prosecuting sitting presidents, subsequent to Trump's re-election that month. The state charges were dropped on November 28, 2025.

== Background ==
=== Attempts to overturn the 2020 election ===
For weeks prior to the impeachment, President Trump made numerous unsuccessful attempts to overturn the 2020 United States presidential election.

=== January 6 U.S. Capitol attack ===
Trump told his supporters to come to Washington, D.C., on January 6, the day Congress was counting the electoral votes, to the "March to Save America" rally at The Ellipse. During the rally, Trump as well as other speakers falsely claimed that the election was stolen, used the word "fight", made an analogy to boxing, and suggested that his supporters had the power to prevent President-elect Joe Biden from taking office.

When the United States Congress convened to certify the electoral votes of the presidential election, supporters of Trump crossed the Mall and stormed the United States Capitol in an attempt to prevent the tabulation of votes and protest against Biden's win. Trump supporters illegally entered the Capitol and gathered on its eastern and western sides, including on the inaugural platform constructed for Biden's inauguration. Five people, including a Capitol Police officer, died from the riots, while several improvised explosive devices were found on and near the Capitol grounds. Another Capitol police officer on duty during the riots died by suicide days later. During the riots, Trump was "initially pleased" by the attack on the Capitol and took no action. In a speech hours into the event, Trump told the rioters "We love you. You're very special," restated his false claims of electoral fraud, and then asked them to go home. Hours later, Congress reconvened and ultimately certified the electoral votes in the early morning hours of January 7. Trump then released a statement asserting that there would be an "orderly transition" of power on Inauguration Day, even while continuing to claim falsely that the election was stolen from him and also stating that he would not attend Biden's inauguration.

== Considered scenarios ==
Four scenarios for the removal of Trump from office had been posited by members of Congress, members of Trump's cabinet, political commentators, or legal scholars: resignation, the invocation of the 14th Amendment, invocation of the 25th Amendment, or impeachment and conviction.

=== Resignation ===
The President of the United States can resign from office, in which case the Vice President will automatically become president, instead of merely assuming the powers and duties of the presidency as acting president. While Article II of the Constitution states that the "Powers and Duties" of the president devolve to the vice president in the event of the president's death, resignation, incapacity, or removal, John Tyler, the tenth president of the United States, interpreted that provision as allowing the Vice President to ascend to the presidency in such cases, without any qualifications. This practice was codified in 1967, with the passage of the 25th Amendment.

If Trump had resigned, Vice President Mike Pence would have become the 46th president of the United States; Pence would have been the shortest-serving president ever, being in office for a matter of days before handing power to Joe Biden as the 47th president on January 20. This would have surpassed the record of William Henry Harrison, who died 31 days into his term. It would have been the second time in history that a president had been forced to resign; the first was the 1974 resignation of Richard Nixon when it appeared inevitable that he would be impeached and removed from office for his role in the Watergate scandal.

Due to intense pressure on his administration, the threat of removal, and numerous resignations, Trump committed to an orderly transition of power in a televised speech on January 7. In the White House on January 8, Trump mentioned that he was not considering resignation. On January 9, The New York Times reported that Trump told White House aides that he regretted his statement committing to an orderly transition of power and that there was no chance he would resign from office.

=== 14th Amendment ===
The Fourteenth Amendment to the United States Constitution is one of the Reconstruction Amendments. It addresses citizenship rights and equal protection under the law, and was proposed in response to issues related to former slaves following the American Civil War. Section 3 states that a person who participated in insurrection after having taken an oath to support the Constitution is disqualified from holding future office unless permitted by Congress.

If Trump had been removed from office under Section 3 of the 14th Amendment, Pence would have become the 46th president of the United States, and he would still have been the shortest-serving president ever before handing power to Biden as the 47th president on January 20. It would also have been the first time that Section 3 of the 14th Amendment had been invoked since 1919 when it stopped Victor L. Berger, convicted of violating the Espionage Act for his anti-militarist views, from taking his seat in the House of Representatives. It would also have been the first time that it had been invoked on a sitting president and its being invoked had been seen as especially unlikely.

Alexandria Ocasio-Cortez was one of the House Democrats who supported invoking the 14th Amendment against Trump. In a letter, Pelosi thanked her colleagues for their contributions to discussions on the 14th Amendment. If successful, the former president would be ineligible for appointment to any federal office without a Senate supermajority vote in favor.

=== 25th Amendment ===
The Twenty-fifth Amendment to the United States Constitution deals with presidential succession and disability. Though the amendment thus far has been used in medical situations, Section 4 provides that the vice president, together with a majority of Cabinet secretaries, may declare the president unable to carry out his duties, after which the vice president immediately assumes the duties of the president.

If Section 4 of the 25th Amendment action had been carried out, it would have made Pence the acting president, assuming the "powers and duties of the office" of the president. Trump would have remained president for the rest of his term, albeit stripped of all authority. Section 4 of the 25th Amendment had not been invoked before. The 25th Amendment, however, was initially created for the case where the president was incapacitated.

Pence, who would have been required to initiate assuming the president's powers and duties, stated that he would not invoke the 25th Amendment against Trump.

=== Impeachment and conviction ===
Impeachment begins in the House of Representatives, where articles of impeachment are drawn up. These articles are then voted on by House members. Each article is voted on separately and requires a simple majority to pass. Once an article has been passed in the House, the president has been impeached. The articles are then sent to the Senate for adjudication with an impeachment trial. After views have been laid out in the trial, the Senate moves to vote on conviction. Each article requires a two-thirds majority of Senators present to pass. If an article passes in the Senate, the president has been convicted and is removed from office. Once the president is convicted, a further vote may then be held which determines whether the (now-former) president is barred from holding future office; this vote passes with a simple majority in the Senate.

Because the Senate was not scheduled to reconvene until January 19, 2021, members of Congress discussed holding the trial after Trump had left office. A former president had never been tried by the Senate; however, Secretary of War William W. Belknap had been impeached by the House and tried by the Senate after he had resigned.

== Invoking the 25th Amendment ==
House Resolution 21—Calling on Vice President Michael R. Pence to convene and mobilize the principal officers of the executive departments of the Cabinet to activate section 4 of the 25th Amendment to declare President Donald J. Trump incapable of executing the duties of his office and to immediately exercise powers as acting president.

Pence's letter to Pelosi rejecting to invoke the 25th Amendment to strip Trump of his powers

On the evening of January 6, CBS News reported that Cabinet members were discussing invoking the 25th Amendment. The ten Democrats on the House Judiciary Committee, led by U.S. Representative David Cicilline, sent a letter to Pence to "emphatically urge" him to invoke the 25th Amendment and declare Trump "unable to discharge the powers and duties of his office", claiming that he incited and condoned the riots. For invocation, Pence and at least eight Cabinet members, forming a simple majority, would have to consent. Additionally, if challenged by Trump, the second invocation would maintain Pence as acting president, subject to a vote of approval in both houses of Congress, with a two-thirds supermajority necessary in each chamber to sustain. However, Congress would not have needed to act before January 20 for Pence to remain acting president until Biden was inaugurated, per the timeline described in Section 4.

Senator Elizabeth Warren (D–MA) accused Education Secretary Betsy DeVos in a tweet of quitting rather than supporting efforts to invoke the 25th Amendment to remove Trump. A Trump administration official disputed Warren's claim. House majority whip Jim Clyburn on Friday accused DeVos and Transportation Secretary Elaine Chao of "running away from their responsibility" by resigning from President Trump's Cabinet before invoking the 25th Amendment to strip him of his powers and duties. News agencies reported that DeVos was in discussions to invoke the 25th Amendment prior to her resignation. By late January 9, it was reported that Pence had not ruled out invoking the 25th Amendment and was actively considering it.

The House Rules Committee met on January 12, 2021, to vote on a non-binding resolution calling on Pence to invoke the 25th Amendment. Pence later stated his position of not invoking the 25th Amendment, according to a letter sent to Pelosi late on January 12. In it, he stated that the 25th Amendment was intended for presidential incapacity or disability, and invoking Section 4 to punish and usurp President Trump in the middle of a presidential transition would undermine and set a terrible precedent for the stability of the executive branch and the United States federal government.

On the same day, the House of Representatives voted to call for Pence to invoke the 25th Amendment. The resolution passed with 223 in favor, 205 against, and 5 (all Republicans) (Note: Republican representatives who did not vote on invoking the 25th Amendment: Dan Crenshaw (TX-2), Kay Granger (TX-12), Greg Murphy (NC-3), Michelle Steel (CA-48), and Daniel Webster (FL-11).) not voting; Adam Kinzinger was the only Republican to join a unified Democratic Caucus.

=== Raskin bill ===
The 25th Amendment allows Congress to establish a committee to determine when a president is unfit to serve (section 4 of the Amendment provides that the "declaration that the President is unable to discharge the powers and duties of his office" is made by "the Vice President and a majority of either the principal officers of the executive departments [i.e., the Cabinet] or of such other body as Congress may by law provide"). However, such a committee has never been established. In May 2017, Representative Jamie Raskin (D–MD-8) introduced legislation to create a standing, independent, nonpartisan body, called the Oversight Commission on Presidential Capacity, to make such a determination. The bill had 20 cosponsors. Raskin had previously introduced a legislative proposal under the same title with the same purpose back in 2017.

In October 2020, Raskin and Pelosi introduced a similar bill to create a Commission on Presidential Capacity to Discharge the Powers and Duties of Office, to have 17 members – four physicians, four psychiatrists, four retired Democratic statespersons, and four retired Republican statespersons appointed by congressional leaders (the Speaker of the House, House Minority Leader, Senate Majority Leader, and Senate Minority Leader). The bill defines "retired statespersons" as former presidents, vice presidents, attorneys general, secretaries of state, defense secretaries, Treasury secretaries, and surgeons general. The committee chair would be appointed by the other members. The bill provides that no members of the commission could be a current elected official, federal employee, or active or reserve military personnel, a measure intended to avoid conflicts of interest and chain-of-command problems. A majority of the commission (nine members), plus the vice president, would need to support invoking the 25th Amendment. The bill had 38 cosponsors. While the bill received renewed interest in the aftermath of the Capitol incident, as with any other bill it would require passage by both houses of Congress and consideration by the president for the commission to be formed and consider invocation of Section 4; thus it was ultimately irrelevant to the immediate situation.

== Impeachment ==
=== Drafted articles of impeachment ===
Within hours of the Capitol attack, members of Congress began to call for the impeachment of Donald Trump as president. Several representatives began the process of independently drafting various articles of impeachment. Of these attempts, the first to become public were those of Representative Ilhan Omar (D–MN-5), who drafted and introduced articles of impeachment against Trump.

Representative David Cicilline (D–RI-1) separately drafted an article of impeachment. The text was obtained by CNN on January 8. On Twitter, Cicilline acknowledged the coauthorship of Ted Lieu and Jamie Raskin, and said that "more than 110" members had signed on to this article. "Article I: Incitement of Insurrection" accuses Trump of having "willfully made statements that encouraged—and foreseeably resulted in—imminent lawless action at the Capitol". As a result of incitement by Trump, "a mob unlawfully breached the Capitol" and "engaged in violent, deadly, destructive, and seditious acts". On January 10, it was announced that the bill had gathered 210 cosponsors in the House.

=== Article of impeachment introduced ===
On January 11, 2021, U.S. representatives David Cicilline, Jamie Raskin and Ted Lieu introduced an article of impeachment against Trump, charging Trump with "incitement of insurrection" in urging his supporters to march on the Capitol building. The article contended that Trump made several statements that "encouraged—and foreseeably resulted in—lawless action" that interfered with Congress' constitutional duty to certify the election. It argued that by his actions, Trump "threatened the integrity of the democratic system, interfered with the peaceful transition of power, and imperiled a coequal branch of Government", doing so in a way that rendered him "a threat to national security, democracy, and the Constitution" if he were allowed to complete his term. By the time it was introduced, 218 of the 222 House Democrats had signed on as cosponsors, assuring its passage. Trump was impeached in a vote on January 13, 2021; ten Republicans, including House Republican Conference chairwoman Liz Cheney, joined all of the Democrats in supporting the article.

On January 12, with the article's passage assured, Pelosi named Raskin, Lieu, Cicilline, Diana DeGette, Joaquin Castro, Eric Swalwell, Joe Neguse, Madeleine Dean, and Stacey Plaskett as managers to present the prosecution case in the Senate conviction trial, with Raskin as lead manager. The managers were chosen for their expertise in constitutional law, civil rights, and criminal justice. Raskin is a former constitutional law professor at American University. Lieu is a former military prosecutor in the United States Air Force. Cicilline is a former public defender. Swalwell was a former prosecutor in California. DeGette is a former civil rights attorney. Castro, Neguse, Dean and Plaskett are all lawyers in private practice.

The House impeachment managers formally triggered the start of the impeachment trial on January 25 by walking across the Capitol and delivering to the Senate the charge against Trump. The nine managers were led into the Senate chamber by the lead impeachment manager, who read the article of impeachment. The trial in the Senate began as scheduled on February 9.

=== House vote ===
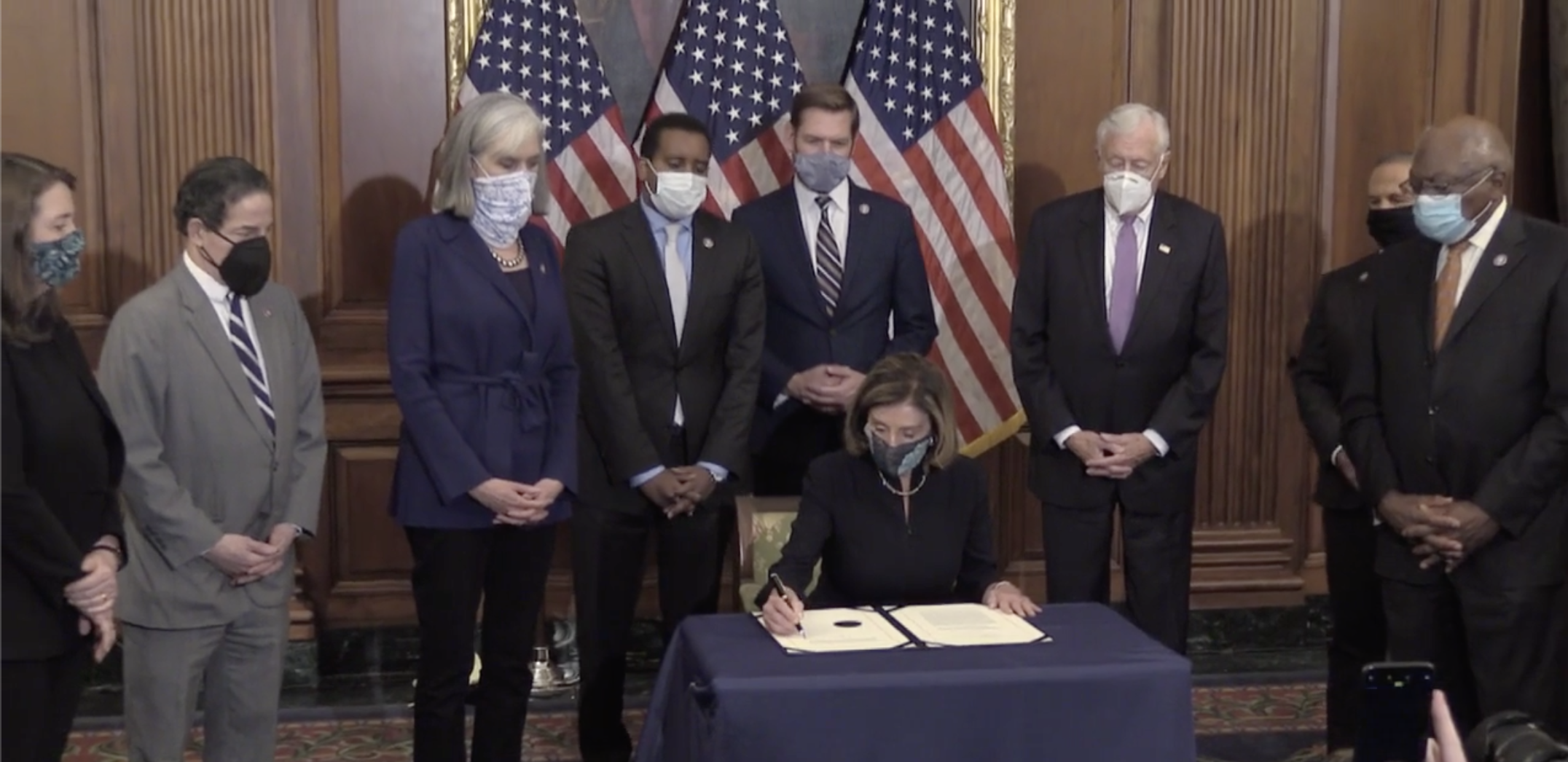
Speaker Nancy Pelosi signs the article of impeachment following passage by the House.

Voting results on House Resolution 24 (impeaching Donald John Trump, former President of the United States, for high crimes and misdemeanors)
Party	Article I (incitement of insurrection)			
Party	Yes	No	Present	Not voting
Democratic (222)	222	–	–	–
Republican (211)	10: Liz Cheney (WY‑AL); Anthony Gonzalez (OH‑16); Jaime Herrera Beutler (WA‑3); John Katko (NY‑24); Adam Kinzinger (IL‑16); Peter Meijer (MI‑3); Dan Newhouse (WA‑4); Tom Rice (SC‑7); Fred Upton (MI‑6); David Valadao (CA‑21)	197	–	4: Kay Granger (TX‑12); Andy Harris (MD‑1); Greg Murphy (NC‑3); Daniel Webster (FL‑11)
Total (433) (Note: At the time of the House vote, two seats were vacant: Louisiana 5 and New York 22.)	232	197	–	4
Result	Adopted (Note: Adoption based on a simple majority.)			

Democratic aye Republican aye Republican nay Republican not voting Vacant seat

Full list of member votes on House Resolution 24
District	Member	Party	Article I
Alabama 1	Jerry Carl	Republican	Nay
Alabama 2	Barry Moore	Republican	Nay
Alabama 3	Mike Rogers	Republican	Nay
Alabama 4	Robert Aderholt	Republican	Nay
Alabama 5	Mo Brooks	Republican	Nay
Alabama 6	Gary Palmer	Republican	Nay
Alabama 7	Terri Sewell	Democratic	Yea
Alaska at-large	Don Young	Republican	Nay
Arizona 1	Tom O'Halleran	Democratic	Yea
Arizona 2	Ann Kirkpatrick	Democratic	Yea
Arizona 3	Raúl Grijalva	Democratic	Yea
Arizona 4	Paul Gosar	Republican	Nay
Arizona 5	Andy Biggs	Republican	Nay
Arizona 6	David Schweikert	Republican	Nay
Arizona 7	Ruben Gallego	Democratic	Yea
Arizona 8	Debbie Lesko	Republican	Nay
Arizona 9	Greg Stanton	Democratic	Yea
Arkansas 1	Rick Crawford	Republican	Nay
Arkansas 2	French Hill	Republican	Nay
Arkansas 3	Steve Womack	Republican	Nay
Arkansas 4	Bruce Westerman	Republican	Nay
California 1	Doug LaMalfa	Republican	Nay
California 2	Jared Huffman	Democratic	Yea
California 3	John Garamendi	Democratic	Yea
California 4	Tom McClintock	Republican	Nay
California 5	Mike Thompson	Democratic	Yea
California 6	Doris Matsui	Democratic	Yea
California 7	Ami Bera	Democratic	Yea
California 8	Jay Obernolte	Republican	Nay
California 9	Jerry McNerney	Democratic	Yea
California 10	Josh Harder	Democratic	Yea
California 11	Mark DeSaulnier	Democratic	Yea
California 12	Nancy Pelosi	Democratic	Yea
California 13	Barbara Lee	Democratic	Yea
California 14	Jackie Speier	Democratic	Yea
California 15	Eric Swalwell	Democratic	Yea
California 16	Jim Costa	Democratic	Yea
California 17	Ro Khanna	Democratic	Yea
California 18	Anna Eshoo	Democratic	Yea
California 19	Zoe Lofgren	Democratic	Yea
California 20	Jimmy Panetta	Democratic	Yea
California 21	David Valadao	Republican	Yea
California 22	Devin Nunes	Republican	Nay
California 23	Kevin McCarthy	Republican	Nay
California 24	Salud Carbajal	Democratic	Yea
California 25	Mike Garcia	Republican	Nay
California 26	Julia Brownley	Democratic	Yea
California 27	Judy Chu	Democratic	Yea
California 28	Adam Schiff	Democratic	Yea
California 29	Tony Cárdenas	Democratic	Yea
California 30	Brad Sherman	Democratic	Yea
California 31	Pete Aguilar	Democratic	Yea
California 32	Grace Napolitano	Democratic	Yea
California 33	Ted Lieu	Democratic	Yea
California 34	Jimmy Gomez	Democratic	Yea
California 35	Norma Torres	Democratic	Yea
California 36	Raul Ruiz	Democratic	Yea
California 37	Karen Bass	Democratic	Yea
California 38	Linda Sánchez	Democratic	Yea
California 39	Young Kim	Republican	Nay
California 40	Lucille Roybal-Allard	Democratic	Yea
California 41	Mark Takano	Democratic	Yea
California 42	Ken Calvert	Republican	Nay
California 43	Maxine Waters	Democratic	Yea
California 44	Nanette Barragán	Democratic	Yea
California 45	Katie Porter	Democratic	Yea
California 46	Lou Correa	Democratic	Yea
California 47	Alan Lowenthal	Democratic	Yea
California 48	Michelle Steel	Republican	Nay
California 49	Mike Levin	Democratic	Yea
California 50	Darrell Issa	Republican	Nay
California 51	Juan Vargas	Democratic	Yea
California 52	Scott Peters	Democratic	Yea
California 53	Sara Jacobs	Democratic	Yea
Colorado 1	Diana DeGette	Democratic	Yea
Colorado 2	Joe Neguse	Democratic	Yea
Colorado 3	Lauren Boebert	Republican	Nay
Colorado 4	Ken Buck	Republican	Nay
Colorado 5	Doug Lamborn	Republican	Nay
Colorado 6	Jason Crow	Democratic	Yea
Colorado 7	Ed Perlmutter	Democratic	Yea
Connecticut 1	John B. Larson	Democratic	Yea
Connecticut 2	Joe Courtney	Democratic	Yea
Connecticut 3	Rosa DeLauro	Democratic	Yea
Connecticut 4	Jim Himes	Democratic	Yea
Connecticut 5	Jahana Hayes	Democratic	Yea
Delaware at-large	Lisa Blunt Rochester	Democratic	Yea
Florida 1	Matt Gaetz	Republican	Nay
Florida 2	Neal Dunn	Republican	Nay
Florida 3	Kat Cammack	Republican	Nay
Florida 4	John Rutherford	Republican	Nay
Florida 5	Al Lawson	Democratic	Yea
Florida 6	Michael Waltz	Republican	Nay
Florida 7	Stephanie Murphy	Democratic	Yea
Florida 8	Bill Posey	Republican	Nay
Florida 9	Darren Soto	Democratic	Yea
Florida 10	Val Demings	Democratic	Yea
Florida 11	Daniel Webster	Republican	NV
Florida 12	Gus Bilirakis	Republican	Nay
Florida 13	Charlie Crist	Democratic	Yea
Florida 14	Kathy Castor	Democratic	Yea
Florida 15	Scott Franklin	Republican	Nay
Florida 16	Vern Buchanan	Republican	Nay
Florida 17	Greg Steube	Republican	Nay
Florida 18	Brian Mast	Republican	Nay
Florida 19	Byron Donalds	Republican	Nay
Florida 20	Alcee Hastings	Democratic	Yea
Florida 21	Lois Frankel	Democratic	Yea
Florida 22	Ted Deutch	Democratic	Yea
Florida 23	Debbie Wasserman Schultz	Democratic	Yea
Florida 24	Frederica Wilson	Democratic	Yea
Florida 25	Mario Díaz-Balart	Republican	Nay
Florida 26	Carlos A. Giménez	Republican	Nay
Florida 27	Maria Elvira Salazar	Republican	Nay
Georgia 1	Buddy Carter	Republican	Nay
Georgia 2	Sanford Bishop	Democratic	Yea
Georgia 3	Drew Ferguson	Republican	Nay
Georgia 4	Hank Johnson	Democratic	Yea
Georgia 5	Nikema Williams	Democratic	Yea
Georgia 6	Lucy McBath	Democratic	Yea
Georgia 7	Carolyn Bourdeaux	Democratic	Yea
Georgia 8	Austin Scott	Republican	Nay
Georgia 9	Andrew Clyde	Republican	Nay
Georgia 10	Jody Hice	Republican	Nay
Georgia 11	Barry Loudermilk	Republican	Nay
Georgia 12	Rick W. Allen	Republican	Nay
Georgia 13	David Scott	Democratic	Yea
Georgia 14	Marjorie Taylor Greene	Republican	Nay
Hawaii 1	Ed Case	Democratic	Yea
Hawaii 2	Kai Kahele	Democratic	Yea
Idaho 1	Russ Fulcher	Republican	Nay
Idaho 2	Mike Simpson	Republican	Nay
Illinois 1	Bobby Rush	Democratic	Yea
Illinois 2	Robin Kelly	Democratic	Yea
Illinois 3	Marie Newman	Democratic	Yea
Illinois 4	Jesús "Chuy" García	Democratic	Yea
Illinois 5	Mike Quigley	Democratic	Yea
Illinois 6	Sean Casten	Democratic	Yea
Illinois 7	Danny K. Davis	Democratic	Yea
Illinois 8	Raja Krishnamoorthi	Democratic	Yea
Illinois 9	Jan Schakowsky	Democratic	Yea
Illinois 10	Brad Schneider	Democratic	Yea
Illinois 11	Bill Foster	Democratic	Yea
Illinois 12	Mike Bost	Republican	Nay
Illinois 13	Rodney Davis	Republican	Nay
Illinois 14	Lauren Underwood	Democratic	Yea
Illinois 15	Mary Miller	Republican	Nay
Illinois 16	Adam Kinzinger	Republican	Yea
Illinois 17	Cheri Bustos	Democratic	Yea
Illinois 18	Darin LaHood	Republican	Nay
Indiana 1	Frank J. Mrvan	Democratic	Yea
Indiana 2	Jackie Walorski	Republican	Nay
Indiana 3	Jim Banks	Republican	Nay
Indiana 4	Jim Baird	Republican	Nay
Indiana 5	Victoria Spartz	Republican	Nay
Indiana 6	Greg Pence	Republican	Nay
Indiana 7	André Carson	Democratic	Yea
Indiana 8	Larry Bucshon	Republican	Nay
Indiana 9	Trey Hollingsworth	Republican	Nay
Iowa 1	Ashley Hinson	Republican	Nay
Iowa 2	Mariannette Miller-Meeks	Republican	Nay
Iowa 3	Cindy Axne	Democratic	Yea
Iowa 4	Randy Feenstra	Republican	Nay
Kansas 1	Tracey Mann	Republican	Nay
Kansas 2	Jake LaTurner	Republican	Nay
Kansas 3	Sharice Davids	Democratic	Yea
Kansas 4	Ron Estes	Republican	Nay
Kentucky 1	James Comer	Republican	Nay
Kentucky 2	Brett Guthrie	Republican	Nay
Kentucky 3	John Yarmuth	Democratic	Yea
Kentucky 4	Thomas Massie	Republican	Nay
Kentucky 5	Hal Rogers	Republican	Nay
Kentucky 6	Andy Barr	Republican	Nay
Louisiana 1	Steve Scalise	Republican	Nay
Louisiana 2	Cedric Richmond	Democratic	Yea
Louisiana 3	Clay Higgins	Republican	Nay
Louisiana 4	Mike Johnson	Republican	Nay
Louisiana 5	Vacant		
Louisiana 6	Garret Graves	Republican	Nay
Maine 1	Chellie Pingree	Democratic	Yea
Maine 2	Jared Golden	Democratic	Yea
Maryland 1	Andy Harris	Republican	NV
Maryland 2	Dutch Ruppersberger	Democratic	Yea
Maryland 3	John Sarbanes	Democratic	Yea
Maryland 4	Anthony Brown	Democratic	Yea
Maryland 5	Steny Hoyer	Democratic	Yea
Maryland 6	David Trone	Democratic	Yea
Maryland 7	Kweisi Mfume	Democratic	Yea
Maryland 8	Jaime Raskin	Democratic	Yea
Massachusetts 1	Richard Neal	Democratic	Yea
Massachusetts 2	Jim McGovern	Democratic	Yea
Massachusetts 3	Lori Trahan	Democratic	Yea
Massachusetts 4	Jake Auchincloss	Democratic	Yea
Massachusetts 5	Katherine Clark	Democratic	Yea
Massachusetts 6	Seth Moulton	Democratic	Yea
Massachusetts 7	Ayanna Pressley	Democratic	Yea
Massachusetts 8	Stephen F. Lynch	Democratic	Yea
Massachusetts 9	Bill Keating	Democratic	Yea
Michigan 1	Jack Bergman	Republican	Nay
Michigan 2	Bill Huizenga	Republican	Nay
Michigan 3	Peter Meijer	Republican	Yea
Michigan 4	John Moolenaar	Republican	Nay
Michigan 5	Dan Kildee	Democratic	Yea
Michigan 6	Fred Upton	Republican	Yea
Michigan 7	Tim Walberg	Republican	Nay
Michigan 8	Elissa Slotkin	Democratic	Yea
Michigan 9	Andy Levin	Democratic	Yea
Michigan 10	Lisa McClain	Republican	Nay
Michigan 11	Haley Stevens	Democratic	Yea
Michigan 12	Debbie Dingell	Democratic	Yea
Michigan 13	Rashida Tlaib	Democratic	Yea
Michigan 14	Brenda Lawrence	Democratic	Yea
Minnesota 1	Jim Hagedorn	Republican	Nay
Minnesota 2	Angie Craig	Democratic	Yea
Minnesota 3	Dean Phillips	Democratic	Yea
Minnesota 4	Betty McCollum	Democratic	Yea
Minnesota 5	Ilhan Omar	Democratic	Yea
Minnesota 6	Tom Emmer	Republican	Nay
Minnesota 7	Michelle Fischbach	Republican	Nay
Minnesota 8	Pete Stauber	Republican	Nay
Mississippi 1	Trent Kelly	Republican	Nay
Mississippi 2	Bennie Thompson	Democratic	Yea
Mississippi 3	Michael Guest	Republican	Nay
Mississippi 4	Steven Palazzo	Republican	Nay
Missouri 1	Cori Bush	Democratic	Yea
Missouri 2	Ann Wagner	Republican	Nay
Missouri 3	Blaine Luetkemeyer	Republican	Nay
Missouri 4	Vicky Hartzler	Republican	Nay
Missouri 5	Emanuel Cleaver	Democratic	Yea
Missouri 6	Sam Graves	Republican	Nay
Missouri 7	Billy Long	Republican	Nay
Missouri 8	Jason Smith	Republican	Nay
Montana at-large	Matt Rosendale	Republican	Nay
Nebraska 1	Jeff Fortenberry	Republican	Nay
Nebraska 2	Don Bacon	Republican	Nay
Nebraska 3	Adrian Smith	Republican	Nay
Nevada 1	Dina Titus	Democratic	Yea
Nevada 2	Mark Amodei	Republican	Nay
Nevada 3	Susie Lee	Democratic	Yea
Nevada 4	Steven Horsford	Democratic	Yea
New Hampshire 1	Chris Pappas	Democratic	Yea
New Hampshire 2	Ann McLane Kuster	Democratic	Yea
New Jersey 1	Donald Norcross	Democratic	Yea
New Jersey 2	Jeff Van Drew	Republican	Nay
New Jersey 3	Andy Kim	Democratic	Yea
New Jersey 4	Chris Smith	Republican	Nay
New Jersey 5	Josh Gottheimer	Democratic	Yea
New Jersey 6	Frank Pallone	Democratic	Yea
New Jersey 7	Tom Malinowski	Democratic	Yea
New Jersey 8	Albio Sires	Democratic	Yea
New Jersey 9	Bill Pascrell	Democratic	Yea
New Jersey 10	Donald Payne Jr.	Democratic	Yea
New Jersey 11	Mikie Sherrill	Democratic	Yea
New Jersey 12	Bonnie Watson Coleman	Democratic	Yea
New Mexico 1	Deb Haaland	Democratic	Yea
New Mexico 2	Yvette Herrell	Republican	Nay
New Mexico 3	Teresa Leger Fernandez	Democratic	Yea
New York 1	Lee Zeldin	Republican	Nay
New York 2	Andrew Garbarino	Republican	Nay
New York 3	Thomas Suozzi	Democratic	Yea
New York 4	Kathleen Rice	Democratic	Yea
New York 5	Gregory Meeks	Democratic	Yea
New York 6	Grace Meng	Democratic	Yea
New York 7	Nydia Velázquez	Democratic	Yea
New York 8	Hakeem Jeffries	Democratic	Yea
New York 9	Yvette Clarke	Democratic	Yea
New York 10	Jerry Nadler	Democratic	Yea
New York 11	Nicole Malliotakis	Republican	Nay
New York 12	Carolyn Maloney	Democratic	Yea
New York 13	Adriano Espaillat	Democratic	Yea
New York 14	Alexandria Ocasio-Cortez	Democratic	Yea
New York 15	Ritchie Torres	Democratic	Yea
New York 16	Jamaal Bowman	Democratic	Yea
New York 17	Mondaire Jones	Democratic	Yea
New York 18	Sean Patrick Maloney	Democratic	Yea
New York 19	Antonio Delgado	Democratic	Yea
New York 20	Paul Tonko	Democratic	Yea
New York 21	Elise Stefanik	Republican	Nay
New York 22	Vacant		
New York 23	Tom Reed	Republican	Nay
New York 24	John Katko	Republican	Yea
New York 25	Joseph Morelle	Democratic	Yea
New York 26	Brian Higgins	Democratic	Yea
New York 27	Chris Jacobs	Republican	Nay
North Carolina 1	G. K. Butterfield	Democratic	Yea
North Carolina 2	Deborah K. Ross	Democratic	Yea
North Carolina 3	Greg Murphy	Republican	NV
North Carolina 4	David Price	Democratic	Yea
North Carolina 5	Virginia Foxx	Republican	Nay
North Carolina 6	Kathy Manning	Democratic	Yea
North Carolina 7	David Rouzer	Republican	Nay
North Carolina 8	Richard Hudson	Republican	Nay
North Carolina 9	Dan Bishop	Republican	Nay
North Carolina 10	Patrick McHenry	Republican	Nay
North Carolina 11	Madison Cawthorn	Republican	Nay
North Carolina 12	Alma Adams	Democratic	Yea
North Carolina 13	Ted Budd	Republican	Nay
North Dakota at-large	Kelly Armstrong	Republican	Nay
Ohio 1	Steve Chabot	Republican	Nay
Ohio 2	Brad Wenstrup	Republican	Nay
Ohio 3	Joyce Beatty	Democratic	Yea
Ohio 4	Jim Jordan	Republican	Nay
Ohio 5	Bob Latta	Republican	Nay
Ohio 6	Bill Johnson	Republican	Nay
Ohio 7	Bob Gibbs	Republican	Nay
Ohio 8	Warren Davidson	Republican	Nay
Ohio 9	Marcy Kaptur	Democratic	Yea
Ohio 10	Mike Turner	Republican	Nay
Ohio 11	Marcia Fudge	Democratic	Yea
Ohio 12	Troy Balderson	Republican	Nay
Ohio 13	Tim Ryan	Democratic	Yea
Ohio 14	David Joyce	Republican	Nay
Ohio 15	Steve Stivers	Republican	Nay
Ohio 16	Anthony Gonzalez	Republican	Yea
Oklahoma 1	Kevin Hern	Republican	Nay
Oklahoma 2	Markwayne Mullin	Republican	Nay
Oklahoma 3	Frank Lucas	Republican	Nay
Oklahoma 4	Tom Cole	Republican	Nay
Oklahoma 5	Stephanie Bice	Republican	Nay
Oregon 1	Suzanne Bonamici	Democratic	Yea
Oregon 2	Cliff Bentz	Republican	Nay
Oregon 3	Earl Blumenauer	Democratic	Yea
Oregon 4	Peter DeFazio	Democratic	Yea
Oregon 5	Kurt Schrader	Democratic	Yea
Pennsylvania 1	Brian Fitzpatrick	Republican	Nay
Pennsylvania 2	Brendan Boyle	Democratic	Yea
Pennsylvania 3	Dwight Evans	Democratic	Yea
Pennsylvania 4	Madeleine Dean	Democratic	Yea
Pennsylvania 5	Mary Gay Scanlon	Democratic	Yea
Pennsylvania 6	Chrissy Houlahan	Democratic	Yea
Pennsylvania 7	Susan Wild	Democratic	Yea
Pennsylvania 8	Matt Cartwright	Democratic	Yea
Pennsylvania 9	Dan Meuser	Republican	Nay
Pennsylvania 10	Scott Perry	Republican	Nay
Pennsylvania 11	Lloyd Smucker	Republican	Nay
Pennsylvania 12	Fred Keller	Republican	Nay
Pennsylvania 13	John Joyce	Republican	Nay
Pennsylvania 14	Guy Reschenthaler	Republican	Nay
Pennsylvania 15	Glenn Thompson	Republican	Nay
Pennsylvania 16	Mike Kelly	Republican	Nay
Pennsylvania 17	Conor Lamb	Democratic	Yea
Pennsylvania 18	Mike Doyle	Democratic	Yea
Rhode Island 1	David Cicilline	Democratic	Yea
Rhode Island 2	James Langevin	Democratic	Yea
South Carolina 1	Nancy Mace	Republican	Nay
South Carolina 2	Joe Wilson	Republican	Nay
South Carolina 3	Jeff Duncan	Republican	Nay
South Carolina 4	William Timmons	Republican	Nay
South Carolina 5	Ralph Norman	Republican	Nay
South Carolina 6	Jim Clyburn	Democratic	Yea
South Carolina 7	Tom Rice	Republican	Yea
South Dakota at-large	Dusty Johnson	Republican	Nay
Tennessee 1	Diana Harshbarger	Republican	Nay
Tennessee 2	Tim Burchett	Republican	Nay
Tennessee 3	Chuck Fleischmann	Republican	Nay
Tennessee 4	Scott DesJarlais	Republican	Nay
Tennessee 5	Jim Cooper	Democratic	Yea
Tennessee 6	John Rose	Republican	Nay
Tennessee 7	Mark E. Green	Republican	Nay
Tennessee 8	David Kustoff	Republican	Nay
Tennessee 9	Steve Cohen	Democratic	Yea
Texas 1	Louie Gohmert	Republican	Nay
Texas 2	Dan Crenshaw	Republican	Nay
Texas 3	Van Taylor	Republican	Nay
Texas 4	Pat Fallon	Republican	Nay
Texas 5	Lance Gooden	Republican	Nay
Texas 6	Ron Wright	Republican	Nay
Texas 7	Lizzie Pannill Fletcher	Democratic	Yea
Texas 8	Kevin Brady	Republican	Nay
Texas 9	Al Green	Democratic	Yea
Texas 10	Michael McCaul	Republican	Nay
Texas 11	August Pfluger	Republican	Nay
Texas 12	Kay Granger	Republican	NV
Texas 13	Ronny Jackson	Republican	Nay
Texas 14	Randy Weber	Republican	Nay
Texas 15	Vicente Gonzalez	Democratic	Yea
Texas 16	Veronica Escobar	Democratic	Yea
Texas 17	Pete Sessions	Republican	Nay
Texas 18	Sheila Jackson Lee	Democratic	Yea
Texas 19	Jodey Arrington	Republican	Nay
Texas 20	Joaquin Castro	Democratic	Yea
Texas 21	Chip Roy	Republican	Nay
Texas 22	Troy Nehls	Republican	Nay
Texas 23	Tony Gonzales	Republican	Nay
Texas 24	Beth Van Duyne	Republican	Nay
Texas 25	Roger Williams	Republican	Nay
Texas 26	Michael C. Burgess	Republican	Nay
Texas 27	Michael Cloud	Republican	Nay
Texas 28	Henry Cuellar	Democratic	Yea
Texas 29	Sylvia Garcia	Democratic	Yea
Texas 30	Eddie Bernice Johnson	Democratic	Yea
Texas 31	John Carter	Republican	Nay
Texas 32	Colin Allred	Democratic	Yea
Texas 33	Marc Veasey	Democratic	Yea
Texas 34	Filemon Vela Jr.	Democratic	Yea
Texas 35	Lloyd Doggett	Democratic	Yea
Texas 36	Brian Babin	Republican	Nay
Utah 1	Blake Moore	Republican	Nay
Utah 2	Chris Stewart	Republican	Nay
Utah 3	John Curtis	Republican	Nay
Utah 4	Burgess Owens	Republican	Nay
Vermont at-large	Peter Welch	Democratic	Yea
Virginia 1	Rob Wittman	Republican	Nay
Virginia 2	Elaine Luria	Democratic	Yea
Virginia 3	Bobby Scott	Democratic	Yea
Virginia 4	Donald McEachin	Democratic	Yea
Virginia 5	Bob Good	Republican	Nay
Virginia 6	Ben Cline	Republican	Nay
Virginia 7	Abigail Spanberger	Democratic	Yea
Virginia 8	Don Beyer	Democratic	Yea
Virginia 9	Morgan Griffith	Republican	Nay
Virginia 10	Jennifer Wexton	Democratic	Yea
Virginia 11	Gerry Connolly	Democratic	Yea
Washington 1	Suzan DelBene	Democratic	Yea
Washington 2	Rick Larsen	Democratic	Yea
Washington 3	Jaime Herrera Beutler	Republican	Yea
Washington 4	Dan Newhouse	Republican	Yea
Washington 5	Cathy McMorris Rodgers	Republican	Nay
Washington 6	Derek Kilmer	Democratic	Yea
Washington 7	Pramila Jayapal	Democratic	Yea
Washington 8	Kim Schrier	Democratic	Yea
Washington 9	Adam Smith	Democratic	Yea
Washington 10	Marilyn Strickland	Democratic	Yea
West Virginia 1	David McKinley	Republican	Nay
West Virginia 2	Alex Mooney	Republican	Nay
West Virginia 3	Carol Miller	Republican	Nay
Wisconsin 1	Bryan Steil	Republican	Nay
Wisconsin 2	Mark Pocan	Democratic	Yea
Wisconsin 3	Ron Kind	Democratic	Yea
Wisconsin 4	Gwen Moore	Democratic	Yea
Wisconsin 5	Scott Fitzgerald	Republican	Nay
Wisconsin 6	Glenn Grothman	Republican	Nay
Wisconsin 7	Tom Tiffany	Republican	Nay
Wisconsin 8	Mike Gallagher	Republican	Nay
Wyoming at-large	Liz Cheney	Republican	Yea

=== Senate trial ===
The second impeachment trial of Donald Trump, the 45th president of the United States (in office from 2017 to 2021), began on February 9, 2021, and concluded with his acquittal on February 13. Trump had been impeached for the second time by the House of Representatives on January 13, 2021. The House adopted one article of impeachment against Trump: incitement of insurrection. He is the only U.S. president and only federal official to be impeached twice. He was impeached by the House seven days prior to the expiration of his term and the inauguration of Joe Biden. Because he left office before the trial, this was the first impeachment trial of a former president. The article of impeachment addressed Trump's attempts to overturn the 2020 presidential election results (including his claims of election fraud and his efforts to pressure election officials in Georgia) and stated that Trump incited the attack on the Capitol in Washington, D.C., while Congress was convened to count the electoral votes and certify the victory of Joe Biden and Kamala Harris.

At the beginning of the trial, Senator Rand Paul forced a vote to dismiss the impeachment charge on the basis that it was unconstitutional to try a former president, arguing that impeachment only applies to current federal officers and that the punishment of removal from office was moot under the circumstances. Supporters of proceeding with the trial argued that the Constitution also permits disqualification from holding future office, which the House had requested in its article of impeachment. The motion was defeated in a 55–45 vote, with all Democrats, both independents, and five Republicans (Susan Collins of Maine, Lisa Murkowski of Alaska, Mitt Romney of Utah, Ben Sasse of Nebraska, and Pat Toomey of Pennsylvania) voting against the motion. This was the first time that a former president had been tried, and only the second time the Senate tried someone who had already left office, after Secretary of War William W. Belknap in 1876. Jamie Raskin was the lead impeachment manager and the primary author – along with Representative David Cicilline and Representative Ted Lieu – of the impeachment article, which charged Trump with inciting an insurrection by sparking the Capitol attack. Joaquin Castro, Eric Swalwell, Madeleine Dean, and Stacey Plaskett also assisted in delivering the oral arguments for conviction.

Trump's defense was led by Michael van der Veen, a personal injury lawyer from Philadelphia, along with David Schoen and Bruce Castor. Van der Veen's style and substance during the trial drew ridicule and criticism from many, with gasps and laughter in the Senate when he stated that he would seek to depose at least 100 people at his Philadelphia office, including Speaker of the House of Representatives Nancy Pelosi and Vice President Kamala Harris. Trump had originally hired Butch Bowers and Deborah Barbier to represent him, but they quit along with three other lawyers after "the former president wanted the lawyers representing him to focus on his allegations of mass election fraud" and his false claim that "the election was stolen from him."

At the conclusion of the trial, the Senate voted 57–43 to convict Trump of inciting insurrection, falling 10 votes short of the two-thirds majority required by the Constitution, and Trump was therefore acquitted. Seven Republican senators joined all Democratic and independent senators in voting to convict Trump, the largest bipartisan vote for an impeachment conviction of a U.S. president or former U.S. president. After the vote on the acquittal, Mitch McConnell said, "There's no question that President Trump is practically and morally responsible for provoking the events of the day." but he voted against conviction due to his interpretation of the United States Constitution.

Verdict in Senate
Party	Article I (incitement of insurrection)	
Party	Guilty	Not guilty
Democratic (48)	48	–
Republican (50)	7: Richard Burr (North Carolina); Bill Cassidy (Louisiana); Susan Collins (Maine); Lisa Murkowski (Alaska); Mitt Romney (Utah); Ben Sasse (Nebraska); Pat Toomey (Pennsylvania)	43
Independent (2)	2: Angus King (Maine); Bernie Sanders (Vermont)	–
Total (100)	57	43
Result	Not guilty (Note: Based on a two-thirds majority threshold to convict.)	

== Opinions ==
=== Support ===
In the aftermath of the attack, members of media and political organizations expressed support for Trump to be either impeached or removed through the methods outlined in the 25th Amendment. Any impeachment by the House of Representatives requires a trial and conviction in the Senate, with the concurrence of two-thirds of Senators present and voting needed to remove the President from office. During the impeachment and trial process, the President remains in office. On January 8, the extent of support among Senators for an impeachment process was unclear, particularly given the length of time necessary to organize a trial and the short duration remaining of Trump's presidency. Poll aggregate website FiveThirtyEight said that roughly 85% of Democrats, 49% of Independents, and 16% of Republicans supported impeachment. The site also found roughly an 8% drop in Trump's approval ratings following the attack.

==== Federal elected officials ====
At least 200 members of Congress called for Trump to be impeached or stripped of his powers and duties under the 25th Amendment. Other House members, as well as several state officials, called for Trump's immediate removal by Congress under the 25th Amendment. On January 6, four "senior Republican elected officials" told CNN that they believe Trump should be removed via the 25th Amendment, while two other Republican elected officials said Trump should be removed by impeachment. On January 11, 24 former Republican members of Congress came out in support of impeachment.

===== House Democrats =====
The day of the attack, many House Democrats, including Seth Moulton, Alexandria Ocasio-Cortez, and Katherine Clark, called for Trump's immediate impeachment and removal by Congress, or via the 25th Amendment. Speaker of the United States House of Representatives Nancy Pelosi, a Democrat, urged the removal of Trump via the 25th Amendment, and announced she was prepared to vote on articles of impeachment if this does not happen. Pelosi said Trump is "a very dangerous person who should not continue in office". In vowing to impeach Trump again if his cabinet does not remove him themself, Pelosi said Trump "incited an armed insurrection against America" and that "the gleeful desecration of the U.S. Capitol, which is the temple of our American democracy, and the violence targeting Congress are horrors that will forever stain our nation's history – instigated by the president."

On January 6, Representatives Ted Lieu and Charlie Crist called on Vice President Mike Pence to remove Trump via the 25th Amendment.

===== House Republicans =====
The first House Republican to call outright for Trump's removal from office was Adam Kinzinger; he tweeted in favor of the 25th Amendment the day after the riot.

On January 8, CNN reported that two unnamed Republican members of the House said they would consider voting for impeachment. One said: "We experienced the attack; we don't need long hearings on what happened." Subsequently, Kinzinger, as well as John Katko, Liz Cheney, Jaime Herrera Beutler, Fred Upton, and Dan Newhouse indicated they would vote in favor of impeachment; other House Republicans that openly considered voting for impeachment included freshman Peter Meijer. Anthony Gonzalez posted a statement expressing support for impeachment to Twitter during the vote. Ultimately, ten Republicans voted to impeach, including Katko, Kinzinger, Upton, Beutler, Newhouse, Meijer, Cheney and Gonzalez, as well as David Valadao of California and Tom Rice of South Carolina. Four Republicans did not vote. Liz Cheney released a strong statement in support of the impeachment, which was also prominently quoted in the closing argument by House majority leader Steny Hoyer, stating that "the president of the United States summoned this mob, assembled the mob, and lit the flame of this attack. Everything that followed was his doing. (...) There has never been a greater betrayal by a President of the United States of his office and his oath to the Constitution." Later the Wyoming GOP demanded for Cheney, the third highest ranking Republican in the House, to resign from her post. She refused to do so, and corrected members of her state party who had said that the Capitol rioting was done by antifa and Black Lives Matter protesters.

===== Senate Democrats =====
By January 7, Democrat Chuck Schumer, the Senate Minority Leader, had called for Trump's immediate removal from office, as had many other Democratic members of the U.S. Senate, such as Elizabeth Warren, Tim Kaine, and Amy Klobuchar.

On Monday, January 11, Senator Joe Manchin (D-WV) said that he thought the plan to vote on impeachment that week was "ill-advised" since there was no path to conviction by the Senate. He said Congress could move forward with impeachment after the inauguration of President-elect Biden.

===== Senate Republicans =====
On January 8, Republican senator Ben Sasse said he was willing to consider an impeachment because Trump had violated his oath of office.

By January 9, no Republican senators were publicly calling for Trump's removal from office, according to CNN. However, two Republican senators had called for his voluntary resignation. On January 8, Republican senator Lisa Murkowski of Alaska called on Trump to resign immediately, stating: "I want him out. He has caused enough damage." Murkowski suggested that she might declare herself an Independent, as, "if the Republican Party has become nothing more than the party of Trump, I sincerely question whether this is the party for me." Republican senator Pat Toomey of Pennsylvania stated on January 9 that he thinks President Trump "committed impeachable offenses" and that his Republican colleagues should be "soul searching" about their own involvement, but he didn't say how he plans to vote if the matter comes to a Senate trial. On January 10, Toomey said that "the best way for our country" would be for Trump "to resign and go away as soon as possible".

After Senate Majority Leader Mitch McConnell acknowledged Biden's victory on December 15, Trump did not speak to McConnell for the remaining month of his presidency. McConnell reportedly believed that Trump had committed impeachable crimes; on Trump's last full day in office, McConnell said that "the mob was fed lies" and that "they were provoked by the president." While McConnell was also said to believe that an impeachment proceeding would make it easier for Republicans to purge Trump's influence from the party, he nevertheless told fellow senators on January 13 that he had not yet decided whether he would vote to convict Trump and that he would listen to the arguments during the trial. Furthermore, McConnell was unwilling to convene the Senate early to hold the trial, entailing that Trump finished his presidential term.

==== State elected officials ====
===== Governors and lieutenant governors =====
After the attack, the following governors and lieutenant governors said that Trump should be removed from office:

- California Governor Gavin Newsom (Democratic)
- Illinois Governor J. B. Pritzker (Democratic)
- Maryland Governor Larry Hogan (Republican)
- Maryland Lieutenant Governor Boyd Rutherford (Republican)
- Massachusetts Governor Charlie Baker (Republican)
- New York Governor Andrew Cuomo (Democratic)
- New Jersey Governor Phil Murphy (Democratic)
- North Carolina Governor Roy Cooper (Democratic)
- Pennsylvania Governor Tom Wolf (Democratic)
- Vermont Governor Phil Scott (Republican)
- Virginia Governor Ralph Northam (Democratic)
- Washington Governor Jay Inslee (Democratic)

===== Former governors =====
- Former California Governor Arnold Schwarzenegger (Republican)
- Former New Jersey Governor Chris Christie (Republican)
- Former Massachusetts Governor Bill Weld (Republican)

==== Administration positions ====
===== Federal employees =====
About 175 career diplomats in the State Department, mostly lawyers, called on Mike Pompeo to support consultations with other cabinet officials on possibly invoking the 25th Amendment to remove the president from office. The cable stated that the president's actions undermined U.S. foreign policy and democratic institutions.

===== Former administration officials =====
Former Secretary of Homeland Security and White House Chief of Staff John F. Kelly, who left Trump's Cabinet in 2019, said that if he had still been part of the administration during the attack, he would have supported Trump's removal from office.

==== Historians, scholars, and commentators ====
More than 1,000 historians and constitutional scholars signed an open letter, posted online on January 11, 2021, calling for Trump to be impeached and removed from office. Additionally, the American Constitution Society published a statement signed by over 900 law professors calling for Congress to impeach and remove Trump from office, or for Vice President Pence and the Cabinet invoke the 25th Amendment.

Yoni Appelbaum (The Atlantic), David French (Time), Austin Sarat, David Frum (The Atlantic), Tom Nichols (USA Today), David Landau, Rosalind Dixon, and Bret Stephens (The New York Times) called for the impeachment of Trump the second time and for him to be disqualified from public office. Mary L. Trump, the President's niece, said she thought her uncle should be barred from ever running for office again.

Several conservative commentators, including Meghan McCain, Rod Dreher, Daniel Larison (The American Conservative), John Podhoretz (Commentary), Tiana Lowe and Eddie Scarry (Washington Examiner) expressed their support for the impeachment and/or the invocation of the 25th Amendment to remove Trump from office. Matthew Continetti, writing in the National Review, also called for Trump's removal from office. Fox News analyst Juan Williams wrote in The Hill, "Arrest the rioters; impeach Trump".

Progressive commentators John Nichols (The Nation) and Matt Ford (The New Republic) also called for Trump to be impeached and permanently disqualified from public office.

Calling the attack an "act of sedition", The Washington Post editorial board wrote that Trump's "continued tenure in office poses a grave threat to U.S. democracy" as well as to public order and national security, and called for Pence to immediately begin the 25th Amendment process to declare Trump "unable to discharge the powers and duties of his office" so that Pence could serve until Biden's inauguration on January 20. In its first-ever staff editorial, The Dispatch stated that Trump "must be removed" for abusing his office, violating the public trust, and inciting "a violent attack on the Capitol and Congress". The Financial Times editorial board called for Trump to be "held accountable for storming the Capitol". The Wall Street Journal editorial board invited Trump to resign, calling his acts "impeachable" and saying that the President had "crossed a constitutional line that Mr. Trump hasn't previously crossed".

==== Other organizations ====
The Lincoln Project, a political action committee formed by anti-Trump Republicans and former Republicans, called for the House of Representatives and the Senate to "immediately impeach Donald Trump for directing and provoking this attack".

The National Association of Manufacturers also requested Pence to "seriously consider" invoking the 25th Amendment.

Freedom House issued a press release calling for the immediate removal of President Trump, through resignation, the 25th Amendment, or impeachment.

The American Civil Liberties Union called for Trump's impeachment for the second time.

March for Science circulated an online petition calling for Trump to be removed immediately via the 25th Amendment.

Crowell & Moring LLP, a large Washington, D.C., law firm, circulated a letter among the nation's largest law firms calling for Trump's removal under Section 4 of the Constitution's 25th Amendment. At least 18 other law firms, including DLA Piper, Foley Hoag, and Hanson Bridgett joined this call.

=== Opposition ===
==== Senators ====
On January 7, Senator Steve Daines (R-MT) said "These calls for impeachment I'm hearing -- I don't think they're helpful, and I think we should allow 13 days to move forward peacefully and prepare for this transition of power that's going to happen on Jan. 20."

On January 8, Senator Lindsey Graham (R–SC) tweeted that impeachment "will do more harm than good". In a follow-up tweet, he implied that Pelosi and Schumer wanted to impeach Trump because they were concerned about their own political survival. Also, on January 11, Graham tweeted "It is past time for all of us to try to heal our country and move forward. Impeachment would be a major step backward."

On January 11, three senators spoke out against impeachment. Senator Cindy Hyde-Smith (R-MS) said "Let's get through the 10 days. He will leave the office and let's get on with things." Senator John Hoeven (R-ND) said "We need to work together to heal the divisions in our nation and impeachment would instead serve to further divide our country." Senator Rick Scott (R-FL) said "I'm not going to do what the Democrats are doing. I think we need to lower the rhetoric. We need to get some unity going."

On January 12, Senator Tim Scott (R-SC) tweeted "An impeachment vote will only lead to more hate and a deeply fractured nation. I oppose impeaching President Trump."

On January 13, seven senators spoke out against impeachment. Senator Bill Hagerty (R-TN) said "At a time when the United States needs national healing and a true commitment to the rule of law, the American people should look to their legislators not to deepen partisan division, but to bring us together. There are seven days to go in the President's term, and he has fully committed to a peaceful transfer of power." Senator Cynthia Lummis (R-WY) said "Moving forward with impeachment at this juncture will only further divide our already hurting nation." Senator Kevin Cramer (R-ND) said: "The president's rhetoric, while reckless, while at some level could be accused of inciting anger and inciting some bad behavior, it is also clear that the exact words that he used do not rise to, in my mind anyway, a criminal level of incitement as we would have to consider, in my view, in this process even as political as it is." Senator Marsha Blackburn (R-TN) said "To persist with impeachment now, with just days to go in the current administration, will further divide Americans and exacerbate tensions. Moving forward, it is my sincere hope Congress will work on a bipartisan basis to restore the confidence of the American people in our elections and affirm our shared commitment to the rule of law." Senator Roger Wicker (R-MS) told the Meridian Star on January 13 that he opposes impeachment. Senator Tom Cotton (R-AR) said: "After January 20, Congress should get on with the people's business: improving our vaccination efforts, getting kids back to school, and getting workers back on the job." Senator Tommy Tuberville (R-AL) said "We just need to go forward to help the people of this country and quit worrying about politics."

On January 14, Senator Mike Rounds (R-SD) said "I think if the question is moot, I don't see a reason to convict."

On January 19, three senators spoke out against impeachment. Senator John Cornyn (R-TX) said "If they proceed with the impeachment trial, I think that will further divide the country." Senator John Thune (R-SD) said, "In my view, using a constitutional tool designed to remove the president from office after he has already left could further divide our country when we can least afford it." Senator Roger Marshall (R-KS) said "Not only is it unconstitutional to impeach a President after he leaves office, I firmly believe an impeachment effort at this juncture will only raise already heated temperatures of the American public and further divide our country at a time when we should be focused on bringing the country together and moving forward. Whether it's getting the COVID-19 vaccine into the arms of all those who want and need it, boosting job recovery, or opening our economy back up to pre-pandemic levels, we have real work to do."

On January 20, Senator John Boozman (R-AR) said "With [Trump] already being gone, impeachment would be a significant expense and waste of time."

On January 21, five senators spoke out against impeachment. Senator Chuck Grassley (R-IA) said "It's one thing, according to the constitution, to impeach a president, but can you impeach a citizen? Because now it's not President Trump, it's citizen Trump." Senator Josh Hawley (R-MO) said "Democrats appear intent on weaponizing every tool at their disposal — including pushing an unconstitutional impeachment process — to further divide the country. Missourians will not be canceled by these partisan attacks." Senator Mike Braun (R-IN) said "I think the key point is, is it constitutional to do this when somebody is out of office — and then, is it purely retribution when you try to push it forward." Senator Ron Johnson (R-WI) said "I believe an impeachment trial of a former president is unconstitutional and would set a very dangerous precedent." Senator Ted Cruz (R-TX) said "It seems that Senate Democrats, the response they have to that is they want to start the new Congress the very first thing, with a vindictive and punitive impeachment trial."

On January 24, two senators spoke out against impeachment. Senator John Barrasso (R-WY) said Democrats were sending a message that "hatred and vitriol of Donald Trump are so strong" that they will hold a trial that stops Biden's policy priorities from moving. Senator Marco Rubio (R-FL) said "The first chance I get to vote to end this trial, I will do it, because I think it's really bad for America."

On January 25, three senators spoke out against impeachment. Senator Joni Ernst (R-IA) said "My concern right now is that the president is no longer in office. Congress would be opening itself to a dangerous standard of using impeachment as a tool for political revenge against a private citizen, and the only remedy at this point is to strip the convicted of their ability to run for future office – a move that would undoubtedly strip millions of voters of their ability to choose a candidate in the next election." Senator Rand Paul (R-KY) tweeted "I object to this unconstitutional sham of an 'impeachment' trial and I will force a vote on whether the Senate can hold a trial of a private citizen." Senator Richard Burr (R-NC) said "A charge like this should go to the Justice Department and be referred for prosecution. Unfortunately, that's not what they're doing." However, Burr ended up voting to convict Trump for the charges on incitement of insurrection.

On January 26, eight senators spoke out against impeachment. Senator James Lankford (R-OK) said "This is not a trial; this is political theater. You cannot remove someone from the office who is already out of office. In this trial, there is no current President, no Chief Justice, and no possibility someone could be removed from office because they are not in any office. In a moment when our nation needs to unite, this trial will only create even deeper divisions." Senator Jim Inhofe (R-OK) tweeted "Given that the penalty for impeachment shall be removed from office, my reading of the Constitution leads me to believe that the Founders did not intend for us to impeach former federal officeholders. I agree with @RandPaul that it's not constitutional to try a former president." Senator John Kennedy (R-LA) said "Today, I voted to affirm that these impeachment proceedings are unconstitutional. Based on the information I have right now, I voted today and will vote again later in the impeachment trial to dismiss the impeachment proceedings against former President Trump." Senator Rand Paul (R-KY) tweeted "This impeachment is nothing more than a partisan exercise designed to further divide the country. Democrats claim to want to unify the country but impeaching a former president, a private citizen, is the antithesis of unity." Senator Richard Shelby (R-AL) told reporters he has "deep reservations whether they should be trying him at all." Senator Roy Blunt (R-MO) tweeted that "I believe the constitutional purpose for presidential impeachment is to remove a president from office, not to punish a person after they have left office." Senator Shelley Moore Capito (R-WV) said "My vote today to dismiss the article of impeachment is based on the fact that impeachment was designed to remove an officeholder from public office. The Constitution does not give Congress the power to impeach a private citizen. This charge is directed at an individual who no longer holds public office. I believe it is time we focus our attention and energies on the numerous challenges our country presently faces. Instead of taking a path of divisiveness, let us heed the call to unity that we have heard spoken so often over the past few weeks." Senator Thom Tillis (R-NC) said "On January 6, I said voting to reject the states' electors was a dangerous precedent we should not set. Likewise, impeaching a former President who is now a private citizen would be equally unwise."

Senator Jim Risch (R-ID) was among a group of Republican senators who have asked Minority Leader Mitch McConnell (R-KY) how to prevent the Senate from even holding a trial.

==== Others ====
Retired Harvard Law School professor Alan Dershowitz, who represented Trump during his first impeachment and had endorsed Biden for president in the 2020 election, opposed another impeachment. He stated that Trump "has not committed a constitutionally impeachable offense" and that he "would be honored to once again defend the Constitution against partisan efforts to weaponize it for political purposes".

George Washington University Law School professor Jonathan Turley wrote an op-ed in The Hill in which he argued that this new impeachment effort would "damage the constitution". While Turley condemned Trump's remarks, he stated that Trump's speech "would be viewed as a protected speech by the Supreme Court". He also noted that Trump "never actually called for violence or riots" and cited other remarks made by congressional Democrats the previous year that similarly encouraged protests that turned violent.

Former National Security Advisor John Bolton called for Trump's resignation; however, he argued against both invocation of the 25th Amendment and impeachment, saying that it was a "very bad idea", that the 25th Amendment was the "worst drafted" section of the Constitution, and would lead to "two competing presidencies" if invoked and challenged by Trump.

As a counter to the push for impeachment, House Republicans introduced a resolution to censure Trump, sponsored by Brian Fitzpatrick with original cosponsors Tom Reed, Young Kim, John Curtis, Peter Meijer, and Fred Upton; Meijer and Upton announced they would also support impeachment.

After the attack, Ohio Governor Mike DeWine said that impeachment was a poor idea, saying that "if that were to occur more people would be inflamed. There would be less trust in the whole system. We only got two more weeks and the next president will take place at 12 noon on January 20, two weeks to go and that will be it."

On January 12, Trump described the impeachment charge as a "witch hunt" that was "causing tremendous anger" among his supporters.

=== Public opinion polls ===
Public opinion polls of impeachment
Pollster	Sample size	Pop	Margin of error	Support	Oppose	Date	Citation
YouGov	1,448	RV	±3.3%	50%	42%	Jan 6	
Ipsos	500	A	±5.0%	51%	36%	Jan 6	
The Hill/HarrisX	964	RV	±3.16%	49%	51%	Jan. 6–7	
Axios/Ipsos	536	A	±4.6%	51%	49%	Jan. 6–7	
Politico/Morning Consult	1,986	RV	±2.0%	44%	43%	Jan. 6–7	
Avalanche Insights	2,009	A	–	58%	34%	Jan 7	
PBS/Marist	875	A	±4.8%	48%	49%	Jan 7	
PBS/Marist	831	RV	±4.9%	49%	48%	Jan 7	
HuffPost/YouGov	1,000	RV	±4.1%	47%	41%	Jan. 6–8	
Change Research	1,116	LV	±3.4%	51%	47%	Jan. 7–8	
ABC/Ipsos	570	A	±4.7%	56%	43%	Jan. 8–9	
Quinnipiac University	1,239	RV	±2.8%	52%	45%	Jan. 7–10	
Data for Progress	1,129	LV	±2.9%	53%	43%	Jan. 9–10	
Vox/Data for Progress	1,233	LV	±2.8%	52%	46%	Jan. 8–11	
Navigator Research	1,000	RV	–	53%	40%	Jan. 8–11	
Politico/Morning Consult	1,996	RV	±2.0%	52%	41%	Jan. 8–11	

RV = registered voters, LV = likely voters, A = all adults.

== See also ==
- Proposed expungements of the impeachments of Donald Trump
- Aftermath of the January 6 United States Capitol attack
- United States House Select Committee on the January 6 Attack
- Trump–Raffensperger phone call
- Republican reactions to Donald Trump's claims of 2020 election fraud
- Efforts to impeach Donald Trump during his first presidency
- Impeachment inquiry against Donald Trump - an impeachment inquiry preceding Trump's first impeachment
- First impeachment of Donald Trump
- First impeachment trial of Donald Trump
- Second impeachment trial of Donald Trump
- Sedition Caucus
- Efforts to impeach Donald Trump during his second presidency
