= Teaching assistant =

Individual who assists a teacher with instructional responsibilities

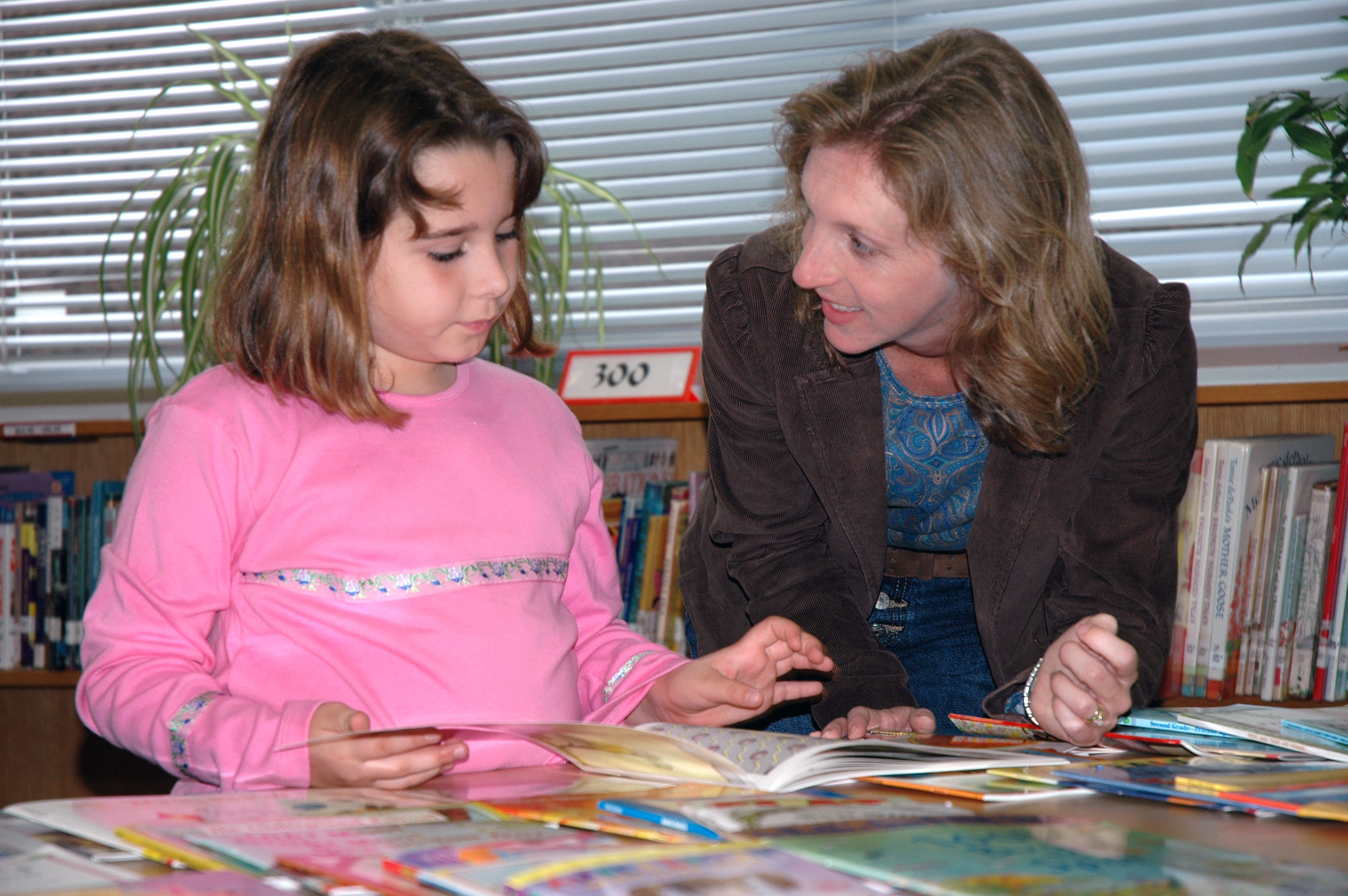
A teaching assistant interacts with a reading child in October 2006 at U.S. Sasebo Naval base

A teaching assistant (TA) is an individual who assists a professor or teacher with instructional responsibilities. TAs include graduate teaching assistants (GTAs), who are graduate students; undergraduate teaching assistants (UTAs), who are undergraduate students; secondary school TAs, who are either high school students or adults; and elementary school TAs, who are adults (also known as paraprofessional educators or teacher's aides).

By definition, TAs assist with classes, but many graduate students serve as the sole instructor for one or more classes each semester as a teaching fellow or graduate student instructor, although in some American states, such as Florida, they are called "teaching assistants". Graduate and adult TAs generally have a fixed salary determined by each contract period (usually a semester or an academic year); however, undergraduates and high school students are sometimes unpaid and in the US and other countries with the credit system, receive course credits in return for their assistance.

== Graduate ==
Graduate teaching assistants (often referred to as GTAs or simply TAs) are graduate students employed on a temporary contract by a department at a college or university in teaching-related responsibilities. In New Zealand, Australian, and some Canadian universities, graduate TAs are known as tutors. North American graduate TA positions provide funding for postgraduate research—although the main purpose is to provide teaching support—and it often serves as a first career step for aspiring academics. TA responsibilities vary greatly and may include: tutoring; holding office hours; invigilating tests or exams; and assisting a professor with a large lecture class by teaching students in recitation, laboratory, or discussion sessions. Professors may also use their teaching assistants to help teach discussions during regular class. This gives the graduate student opportunity to use their teaching skills, as many are in pursuit of teaching careers. Some graduate students assist in distance education courses by meeting with the students as professors are not able to. Graduate TAs should not be confused with teaching fellows (TFs) or graduate student instructors (GSIs), who are graduate students who serve as the primary instructors for courses. However, at some universities, such as those in the Florida State University System, there are neither teaching fellows nor graduate student instructors, and "teaching assistant" is the only title used.

=== Tutorials ===
In British, Australian, New Zealand, South African, Indian, Italian, Irish and some Canadian universities, a TA is often, but not always, a postgraduate student or a lecturer assigned to conduct a seminar for undergraduate students, often known as a tutorial. At the University of Cambridge, tutors are known as supervisors, and tutorials are supervisions. The equivalent of this kind of tutor in the United States and the rest of Canada is known as a graduate teaching assistant or a graduate student instructor (GSI).

== Undergraduate ==
UTAs or JTAs (Junior Teacher Assistants) usually serve as true assistants to a class; they typically have taken the course with which they are assisting, often with the same professor, and have performed well in it. This case is less common for GTAs, since many would have been undergraduates at other institutions. Unlike professors and GTAs, UTAs generally do not have a fixed salary but instead are paid by the hour, earn credit hours, or volunteer their time.

== High school ==
The term teaching assistant is used in a school setting for students or adults that assist a teacher with one or more classes. The responsibilities, situations, and conditions of these individuals' involvement differ from those in higher education. A less formal position, a TA job in secondary education is generally determined by the supervising teacher. Common tasks include assisting students with their work, and taking attendance. Most of the responsibilities of Teaching Assistants do not require the academic expertise of the professor in charge. Some teaching assistants at this level may teach portions of the class lessons, or teach lessons to small groups of students who need extra instruction. Many TAs work "one-on-one" with students in special education; these TAs shadow their student and assist with classwork, organization, and behavior management. In some parts of the United States it is customary or even required that each classroom have one certified teacher and one or more co-teachers or teaching assistants.

Students attending high school and middle schools can take a course, usually an elective, and perform tasks such as grade and record scores on homework or tests. The teacher in this setting reviews the grading to assign partial credit on tests and uses discretion.

== Elementary school ==
An elementary school teaching assistant is an adult who is hired to help a teacher with class-related duties, which are similar to those encountered in middle and high school settings. They are sometimes referred to as paraprofessionals ("paras" for short) or teacher's aides. Elementary school teaching assistants are generally hired on a contract that lasts the entire academic year. Teaching assistants aide with multiple duties within schools and can be hired in special education as well.

== See also ==
- Professors in the United States § Non-tenure-track positions
- Research assistant
- Teaching associate
- Tutor
- Tutor expertise in adult education
