= Legal Alliance for Reproductive Rights =

Coalition of United States law firms

The Legal Alliance for Reproductive Rights is a coalition of United States law firms offering free legal services to people seeking and providing abortions in the wake of Dobbs v. Jackson Women's Health Organization, which overruled Roe v. Wade. The group is led by San Francisco city attorney David Chiu. The group plans to provide pro bono representation to pregnant women and abortion providers facing civil suits and criminal charges related to seeking or providing abortions.

== Participating law firms ==
Participating law firms include:

- Altshuler Berzon
- Arguedas Cassman Headley & Goldman
- Arnold & Porter
- BraunHagey & Borden
- Clarence Dyer & Cohen
- Conrad Metlitzky Kane
- Crowell & Moring
- Durie Tangri
- Farella Braun + Martel
- Glenn Agre Bergman & Fuentes
- Hanson Bridgett
- Keker Van Nest & Peters
- Lewis & Llewellyn
- Lieff Cabraser
- Heimann & Bernstein
- Moeel Lah Fakhoury
- Margolin, Allison B.
- Morrison & Foerster
- Nassiri & Jung
- Orrick, Herrington & Sutcliffe
- Paul, Weiss, Rifkind, Wharton & Garrison
- Ramsey & Ehrlich
- Rogers Joseph O'Donnell
- Swanson & McNamara
- Willkie Farr & Gallagher
