= Morrison & Foerster =

American law firm

Morrison & Foerster LLP
- Headquarters: San Francisco
- No. of offices: 19 (2026)
- No. of attorneys: 1,021 (2025)
- Key people: Eric McCrath (Chair)
- Revenue: US$1.54 billion (2025)

Morrison & Foerster LLP (also known as MoFo) is an American multinational law firm headquartered in San Francisco, California. As of February 2026, the firm had 19 offices worldwide.

== History ==
Morrison & Foerster was founded in San Francisco in 1883.

In 1960, it had one office and fewer than 25 lawyers. During the 1960s, its lawyers began working with emerging Silicon Valley technology companies. By 1999, it had more than 675 lawyers in 15 offices across six countries.

The firm expanded to other California cities during the 1970s.

In 1974 the firm expanded outside San Francisco and opened an office in Los Angeles to better meet the needs of longtime client Crocker National Bank.

Soon after, the firm expanded again, opening an office in Washington, D.C. in 1979 and its first non-U.S. office in London in 1980.

In 1987 the firm merged with New York-based litigation company Parker Auspitz and opened its Tokyo office.

The firm merged again in 1991, this time with Ciotti & Murashige. A decade later, Morrison & Foerster became one of the largest international law firms in Tokyo when it merged with Ito & Mitomi.

In September 2013, it announced plans to open in Berlin by recruiting the office of Hogan Lovells, including nine partners. It had opened a Singapore office earlier that year.

Later in 2013, the German team advised Axel Springer on its acquisition of N24 Media.

In 2022 Morrison & Foerster was a founding member of the Legal Alliance for Reproductive Rights, a coalition of United States law firms offering free legal services to people seeking and providing abortions.

In February 2026, the firm opened an office in Seattle after recruiting a litigation team from Perkins Coie.

== Clients ==
The firm was the lead bankruptcy counsel to Residential Capital (ResCap). Its Chapter 11 liquidation plan was confirmed.

In July 2013 Morrison & Foerster represented SoftBank in its $21.6 billion acquisition of a 78 percent stake in Sprint Nextel.

The firm represented Sandoz in a 2017 Supreme Court case concerning the notice required before marketing biosimilar drugs. In February 2018, it represented Uber in the settlement of Waymo’s trade-secret lawsuit. Its corporate work included advising Intel on the $15.3 billion acquisition of Mobileye.

== Morrison & Foerster Foundation ==
In 2015, Law360 reported that the firm's charitable foundation had donated about $45 million since 1986.

== Notable alumni ==
- Beth Brinkmann, former assistant to the solicitor general of the U.S. from 1993 until 2001, and who served as a partner until 2009.
- Drew S. Days III, who served as the United States Solicitor General from 1993 to 1996, and who served as of counsel until 2011.
- LaShann M. DeArcy, judge of the United States District Court for the Eastern District of New York since 2015
- Ketanji Brown Jackson, justice of the Supreme Court of the United States. Formerly judge for the United States District Court for the District of Columbia from 2013 to 2021, former commissioner on the U.S. Sentencing Commission, who served as of counsel until 2013.
- Shirley Hufstedler, first U.S. Secretary of Education from 1979 to 1981, who was of counsel.
- Tony West, former acting United States Associate Attorney General, who served as a partner until 2009.

== Legal disputes ==
In 2018, female lawyers sued the firm, alleging discrimination relating to sex, pregnancy and maternity leave. The firm denied discriminating against the plaintiffs. Five plaintiffs settled in 2020; the remaining two settled in March 2022.

In 2023, the American Alliance for Equal Rights sued over eligibility restrictions in the firm’s diversity fellowship. The firm subsequently opened eligibility to applicants of all races. The group voluntarily dismissed its lawsuit in October. The firm said revisions had already been underway.

In September 2025, the firm agreed to pay £25,000 plus legal costs to a trans man and the Good Law Project, without admitting liability. They had alleged discrimination after its London office declined to act following an initial agreement to provide representation. The firm denied that its decision was discriminatory or connected to political events in the United States.

== See also ==
- List of largest law firms by revenue
