= The Death of Expertise =

2017 nonfiction book by Tom Nichols

The Death of Expertise: The Campaign Against Established Knowledge and Why it Matters
- Author: Tom Nichols
- Language: English
- Genre: Non-fiction
- Published: April 1, 2017
- Publisher: Oxford University Press
- Publication place: United States
- Media type: Print, e-book
- ISBN: 978-0-19-046941-2

The Death of Expertise: The Campaign Against Established Knowledge and Why it Matters is a 2017 nonfiction book by Tom Nichols. It is an expansion of a 2014 article published in The Federalist.

== Summary ==
In The Death of Expertise, Nichols condemns what he describes as the many forces trying to undermine the authority of experts in the United States. He blames trends in higher education (such as focus on self-esteem and tolerance of narcissism leading to grade inflation and over-confidence in one's own abilities), the Internet, and the explosion of media options for the anti-expertise and anti-intellectual sentiment which he sees as being on the rise. While conceding that experts do sometimes fail, he says the best answer to this is the self-correcting presence of other experts to recognize and rectify systemic failures.

These are dangerous times. Never have so many people had access to so much knowledge, and yet been so resistant to learning anything.

— Tom Nichols, The Death of Expertise

== Reviews ==
Publishers Weekly said that "The crux of the book's argument is that ... the American public have grown increasingly hostile to expertise" and described The Death of Expertise as a "highly researched and impassioned book that's well timed", further noting that "Generally, Nichols displays strong reasoning, but at times he goes off the rails. It takes some time [in some sections] for him to make his point".

Kirkus Reviews described The Death of Expertise as "A sharp analysis of an increasingly pressing problem", although Nichols (who "sounds less like an alarmist than like a genial guide through the wilderness of ignorance") fails to propose a satisfying solution. Andrew Joseph Pegoda disagreed on the last point, writing that The Death of Expertise "does what good books do ... and provides some possible solutions". Pegoda also described The Death of Expertise as "extremely interesting, important, and timely" and said that "Nichols, in short, provides a brief History, informed by psychology and political science, of what he argues is a new phenomenon whereby people in the United States are not just regularly wrong or ignorant but 'proud of not knowing things'". Pegoda praised Nichols for not conflating expertise with credentials, and, while avowing that the book has some shortcomings, it has the "potential to start more important conversations".

Michiko Kakutani in The New York Times stated that The Death of Expertise "turns out to be an unexceptional book about an important subject. The volume is useful in its way, providing an overview of just how we arrived at this distressing state of affairs." The review goes on to cite Nichols' author notes as one of the highlights of the volume as it points the reader to "more illuminating books and articles."

Joshua Huminski of the Diplomatic Courier described the book as "timely", citing Donald Trump's statements on climate change and Pew Research surveys regarding genetically modified organisms. He found Nichols' explanations of the reasons for the current situation as "successful on some accounts and less so on others", but his review was generally positive ("Nichols clearly identifies multiple sources of the erosion of the belief in experts and their prominence in today's society").

Stuart Vyse in Skeptical Inquirer "strongly recommends" the book and says that "[o]ne of the best things about the book is its apolitical stance" and finds "very little to quibble with" despite having different political leanings from the author.

== Second edition ==
A second edition was published in 2024. One of the new topics is the COVID-19 epidemic.

== Translations ==
- Chinese: 專業之死：為何反知識會成為社會主流，我們又該如何應對由此而生的危機？. Translated by Cheng, Huan-sheng. Taiwan: Faces Publishing. 2024. ISBN 978-626-315-262-5.
- Japanese: 専門知は、もういらないのか：無知礼賛と民主主義. Translated by Takasato, Hiro. Japan: Misuzu Shobo, Ltd. 2019. ISBN 978-4-622-08816-5.

== See also ==
- Anti-intellectualism – Hostility to and mistrust of education, philosophy, art, literature, and science
- Noise: A Flaw in Human Judgment – 2021 book by Daniel Kahneman, Olivier Sibony, and Cass Sunstein
- Trust Us, We're Experts – 2001 book by Sheldon Rampton and John Stauber
- The Cult of the Amateur - 2007 book written by Andrew Keen
