= Mitchell J. Nathan =

American academic

- Occupation: Academic

Academic background
- Education: University of Colorado Boulder

Mitchell J. Nathan is an American academic, who is a Full Professor of Educational Psychology, Chair of the Learning Science program in the School of Education at the University of Wisconsin–Madison, and a researcher at the Wisconsin Center for Education Research.

Nathan uses experimental design and video based discourse analysis methods to study learning and teaching in school settings. His research investigates the role of prior knowledge and invented strategies in the development of algebraic thinking, the notion of Expert Blind Spot to explain teachers' instructional decision making, and how teachers use gestures, embodiment and objects to convey abstract ideas during instruction.

He is principal researcher for the STAAR project (Supporting the Transition from Arithmetic to Algebraic Reasoning) funded through the IERI program by the National Science Foundation, U.S. Department of Education's Institute for Educational Sciences, and National Institutes of Health-NICHD), and has secured over $10 million in research funds as a PI or co-PI.

He has published over 50 peer-reviewed papers in his subject; the most cited one has been cited 316 times according to Google Scholar.

== Publications ==
Alibali, M. W. & Nathan, M. J. (2007). Teachers' gestures as a means of scaffolding students' understanding: Evidence from an early algebra lesson. In Goldman, R., Pea, R., Barron, B. J., and Derry, S. (Eds.) Video Research in the Learning Sciences (pp. 349–365). Mah Wah, NJ: Erlbaum.

Nathan, M. J. & Kim, S. (2007). Pattern generalization with graphs and words: A cross-sectional and longitudinal analysis of middle school students’ representational fluency. Mathematical Thinking and Learning, 9(3), 193–219.

Nathan, M. J. & Koellner, K. (2007). A framework for understanding and cultivating the transition from arithmetic to algebraic reasoning. Mathematical Thinking and Learning. 9(3), 179–192.

Nathan, M. J. & Jackson, K. (2006). Reframing the role of Boolean classes in qualitative research from an embodied cognition perspective. In S. Barab, K. Hay, & D. Hickey (Eds.) Proceedings of the International Conference on the Learning Sciences (pp. 502–508). Mah Wah, NJ: Erlbaum.

Koedinger, K. R. & Nathan, M. J. (2004). The real story behind story problems: Effects of representations on quantitative reasoning. Journal of the Learning Sciences, 13(2), 129–164.

Nathan, M. J. & Petrosino, A. J. (2003). Expert blind spot among preservice teachers. American Educational Research Journal. 40(4), 905–928.

Nathan, M. J. & Knuth, E. (2003). A study of whole classroom mathematical discourse and teacher change. Cognition and Instruction. 21(2), 175–207.

Nathan, M. J. (2002). Mathematics Learning: Algebra. In James W. Guthrie (Ed.) Encyclopedia of Education, Second Edition (Vol. 5, pp. 1542–1545). New York: Macmillan Reference USA.

Nathan, M. J., Long, S. D., & Alibali, M. W. (2002). The symbol precedence view of mathematical development: A corpus analysis of the rhetorical structure of algebra textbooks. Discourse Processes, 33(1), 1-21.

Nathan, M. J., Koedinger, K. R., & Alibali, M. W. (2001). Expert blind spot: When content knowledge eclipses pedagogical content knowledge. In L. Chen et al. (Eds.), Proceedings of the Third International Conference on Cognitive Science. (pp. 644–648). Beijing, China: USTC Press.

Nathan, M. J. & Robinson, C. (2001). Considerations of learning and learning research: Revisiting the “Media effects” debate. Journal of Interactive Learning Research, 12, 69–88. (formerly Journal of Artificial Intelligence and Education).

Nathan, M. J., and Koedinger, K. R. (2000). An investigation of teachers’ beliefs of students’ algebra development. Cognition and Instruction, 18(2), 209–237.

Nathan, M. J., and Koedinger, K. R. (2000). Teachers’ and researchers’ beliefs about the development of algebraic reasoning. Journal for Research in Mathematics Education, 31, 168–190.

Nathan, M. J., and Koedinger, K. R. (2000). Moving beyond teachers' intuitive beliefs about algebra learning. Mathematics Teacher, 93, 218–223.

Nathan, M. J. (1998). The impact of theories of learning on learning environment design. Interactive Learning Environments, 5, 135–160.

Cognition and Technology Group at Vanderbilt (1997). The Jasper Project: Lessons in Curriculum, Instruction, Assessment, and Professional Development. Mah Wah, NJ: Erlbaum.

Nathan, M. J., Bransford, J. D., Brophy, S., Garrison, S., Goldman, S. R., Kantor, R. J., Vye, N., J., & Williams, S. (1994). Multimedia journal articles: Promises, pitfalls and recommendations. Educational Media International, 31, 265-273

Tabachneck, H. T., Koedinger, K., & Nathan, M. J. (1994). Toward a theoretical account of strategy use and sense-making in mathematics problem solving. Proceedings of the Sixteenth Annual Conference of the Cognitive Science Society (pp. 836–841). Hillsdale, N.J.: Erlbaum.

Kintsch, W., Britton, B.K., Fletcher, C.R., Kintsch, E., Mannes, S.M., & Nathan, M.J. (1993). A comprehension-based approach to learning and understanding. The Psychology of Learning and Motivation, 30, 165–214.

Nathan, M. J., Kintsch, W., & Young, E. (1992). A theory of algebra word problem comprehension and its implications for the design of computer learning environments. Cognition and Instruction, 9(4). 329–389.

Magee, M. and Nathan, M. (1987). A viewpoint-independent modeling approach to object recognition. IEEE Journal of Robotics and Automation, 3(4). 351–356.
