= Tom Nichols (academic) =

Retired professor and author on international affairs

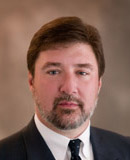
- Nichols in 2009
- Born: Thomas Michael Nichols; December 7, 1960 (age 65); Holyoke, Massachusetts, U.S.
- Occupations: Author; academic
- Spouse: Lynn Nichols (m. 2014)
- Children: 1

Academic background
- Education: Boston University (BA); Columbia University (MA); Georgetown University (PhD)
- Thesis: The politics of doctrine: Khrushchev, Gorbachev, and the Soviet military (1988)

Academic work
- Institutions: U.S. Naval War College; Harvard University; La Salle University; Dartmouth College; Georgetown University

Thomas Michael Nichols (born December 7, 1960) is an American writer, academic specialist on international affairs, and retired professor at the U.S. Naval War College. His work dealt with issues involving Russia, nuclear weapons, and national security affairs.

== Early life and education ==
Born in Holyoke, Massachusetts, Nichols grew up in Chicopee, Massachusetts, where he attended public schools in the 1960s and 1970s. His mother is of Irish descent and his paternal grandparents were Greek immigrants. He stated in a speech at the Heritage Foundation that he did not come from an educated family, noting that his parents were "both Depression era kids who dropped out of high school".

Nichols was awarded a BA degree in political science from Boston University in 1983, an MA degree in political science from Columbia University in 1984, a certificate from the Harriman Institute of Columbia University in 1985, and a PhD in government from Georgetown University in 1988. His doctoral thesis was entitled The politics of doctrine: Khrushchev, Gorbachev, and the Soviet military.

Nichols is a five-time Jeopardy! champion, winning during regular season play in 1994. Nichols initially lost his fifth game, but was invited back due to "a clue discrepancy". He later participated in the 1994 Tournament of Champions and the 2005 Ultimate Tournament of Champions held by the game show, losing in the quarterfinals and the first round, respectively. In a 2022 interview with Newsweek, Nichols advocated for the reinstatement of a five-day limit for winners that had been eliminated in 2003.

== Career ==
Following completion of his doctorate at Georgetown University, in 1989 Nichols received a faculty appointment at Dartmouth College. He remained there until 1997, teaching political science and Russian affairs.

Concurrent during his tenure at Dartmouth, Nichols served as legislative aide for defense and foreign affairs to U.S. Senator John Heinz (R-PA).

In 1997, Nichols became professor of strategy at the U.S. Naval War College, a position he retained until 2008. Subsequently, Nichols was named professor of national security affairs at the war college. He retired in 2022. He also was a senior associate of the Carnegie Council for Ethics in International Affairs that is based in Manhattan (2004–2005).

In 2005, Nichols was appointed to visiting and adjunct faculty roles at La Salle University and Harvard University, respectively. Nichols was named a fellow at the Harvard John F. Kennedy School of Government in 2008.

He is a staff writer at The Atlantic and the author of one of its electronic newsletters, The Atlantic Daily.

Nichols often is featured as a fellow commentator on the Substack publication, To the contrary, by Charlie Sykes.

== Politics ==
Nichols registered in 1979 with the Republican Party. In 2016, he described himself as a Never Trump conservative. During the 2016 presidential campaign, Nichols argued that conservatives should vote for Hillary Clinton, whom he detested, because Trump was "too mentally unstable" to serve as commander-in-chief. Nichols continued that type of argument for the 2018 midterm elections and advocated that Republicans could save the party by electing as many Democrats as possible in that election.

Following the confirmation of Brett Kavanaugh to the Supreme Court of the United States, Nichols announced on October 7, 2018, that he would leave the Republican Party to become an independent. He claimed that Senator Susan Collins's "yes" vote on the confirmation convinced him that the Republican Party exists solely to exercise raw political power. He stated that the Republicans had become a threat to the rule of law and to constitutional norms. Nichols also criticized the Democratic Party for being "torn between totalitarian instincts on one side and complete political malpractice on the other". He said that with the exception of Senators Chris Coons, Sheldon Whitehouse, and Amy Klobuchar, the behavior of the members of the Democratic Party during the Kavanaugh hearings was "detestable."

In an opinion column published in 2019, Nichols cited the Mueller Report to argue that Trump failed in his role as a citizen and then as commander-in-chief, by not doing more to prevent and punish the Russian interference in the 2016 United States elections. In April 2022, Nichols was quoted regarding the Russian invasion of Ukraine, stating: "If Putin's goal was to cement his grip on power by making Russia hated for decades to come, well, congratulations, I guess."

In October 2025, Nichols appeared on MSNBC's "Deadline: White House" to discuss President Trump's military strikes on suspected drug boats in Pacific and Caribbean waters. Nichols expressed agreement with Senator Rand Paul, who had condemned the operations as extrajudicial acts. Nichols stated: "Basically the president – and I want to kind of foot stomp behind Paul here about a plan – the American president has said, 'I can point the U.S. military any place I want and kill anyone I want.' That, eventually, is going to become a principle in the domestic use of the military. He is acclimating people to the notion that the military is his private army, unconstrained by law, unconstrained by norms, unconstrained by American traditions." Nichols expressed skepticism about the administration's stated rationale for the strikes, arguing they might not have "anything to do with drugs" and could primarily serve as precedent for expanded executive powers over the military.

== Personal life ==
His first marriage ended in divorce. Nichols married Lynn in 2014. Nichols has one daughter; the family lives in Middletown, Rhode Island. He is a Greek Orthodox Christian.

Nichols had a cat, Carla, whom he revered as having saved his life. Carla died in 2024.

Nichols had a cameo role on the HBO television series Succession, appearing as right-wing political commentator Ben Stove in the episode entitled "America Decides".

Nichols plays video games in his spare time, including Baldur's Gate 3 and games from the Fallout series.

== Awards ==
- Petra T. Shattuck Excellence in Teaching Award from Harvard Extension School (2012)
- Navy Meritorious Civilian Service Award.

== Books ==
- The Sacred Cause: Civil-Military Conflict over Soviet National Security, 1917-1992 (1993, Cornell University Press) ISBN 0801427746
- The Russian Presidency: Society and Politics in the Second Russian Republic (1999, Palgrave Macmillan) ISBN 0312293372
- Winning the World: Lessons for America's Future from the Cold War (2002, Praeger) ISBN 0275966631
- Eve of Destruction: The Coming Age of Preventive War (2008, University of Pennsylvania Press) ISBN 0812240669
- Tactical Nuclear Weapons and NATO, (co-editor) (2012, Military Bookshop) ISBN 1584875259
- No Use: Nuclear Weapons and U.S. National Security (2013, University of Pennsylvania Press) ISBN 0812245660
- The Death of Expertise: The Campaign Against Established Knowledge and Why it Matters (2017, Oxford University Press) ISBN 0190469412
- Nichols, Tom (2021b). Our Own Worst Enemy: The Assault From Within on Modern Democracy. New York: Oxford University Press. ISBN 978-0-19-751887-8.

== See also ==
- List of Republicans who opposed the Donald Trump presidential campaign, 2016
