= Hanson Bridgett =

- Headquarters: San Francisco, United States
- No. of offices: 6
- No. of attorneys: Approximately 200
- Key people: Kristina Lawson (Managing Partner)
- Date founded: 1958
- Company type: LLPs
- Website: hansonbridgett.com

Hanson Bridgett is a US-based law firm with more than 200 attorneys in offices throughout California.

== History ==
Hanson Bridgett LLP was founded in 1958 by the merger of Schofield, Hanson and Jenkins and Bridgett and Marcus. The new firm name became Schofield, Hanson, Bridgett, Marcus & Jenkins. Schofield retired shortly after the firm was founded and his name was removed from the firm name. The founding partners were: Allison Schofield, Raymond Hanson, Arthur Bridgett, Gerald Marcus and Thomas Jenkins. Over time, the firm name has evolved and in 2008 it was shortened to "Hanson Bridgett LLP".

One of the founders that remains in the name of the firm is Raymond Hanson. After serving as an intelligence officer for the U.S. Navy in World War II, Hanson founded the law firm that was then known as Hanson, Bridgett, Marcus, Vlahos and Rudy.

The other founder, still part of the current firm name, is Arthur Bridgett. Bridgett was a solo attorney for several years before forming Bridgett & Marcus with Gerald Marcus in 1953. The firm merged with Schofield, Hanson & Jenkins in 1958 to form the firm that would become Hanson, Bridgett, Marcus, Vlahos & Rudy.

In January 2020, the company announced that Kristina Lawson had been elected as the firm's next managing partner, becoming the first woman to lead the firm.

Hanson Bridgett partner Howard Ashcraft participated in the AIA California Council Integrated Project Delivery Task Force to create a working definition of integrated project delivery (IPD) in May 2007.

In 2022, Hanson Bridgett was a founding member of the Legal Alliance for Reproductive Rights, a coalition of United States law firms offering free legal services to people seeking and providing abortions in the wake of Dobbs v. Jackson Women's Health Organization, which overruled Roe v. Wade.

== Notable attorneys ==
Andrew Giacomini has been managing partner since 2001 and joined Hanson Bridgett after finishing law school in 1991.

Former U.S. Congressman Douglas H. Bosco has been an attorney at Hanson Bridgett since 2008.

U.S. Representative Jackie Speier served as of counsel for Hanson Bridgett from 2007 to 2008.

Gary Giacomini, former partner at Hanson Bridgett, worked at the firm for 20 years prior to his death in 2016. Giacomini was a longtime member of the Marin County Board of Supervisors and State Coastal Commission.

Former mayor of Sacramento and former State Senator Darrell Steinberg practiced with Hanson Bridgett from 2004 to 2006, between his services as Assemblyman and State Senator.

== Notable clients ==
Its regional focus has appealed to a large number of California public agencies. In addition to the San Mateo County Transit District (SamTrans) and Caltrain, Hanson Bridgett services transit and water agencies throughout California, as well as agencies like the Golden Gate Bridge, Highway & Transportation District, which maintains the Golden Gate Bridge.

Prologis and Blue Diamond Growers are among the firm's corporate clients.

In 2011, Hanson Bridgett was made the official law firm of the 34th America's Cup.
