= Tutor expertise in adult education =

Tutor expertise in adult education, through the use of content and process experts, is important in the successful delivery of adult education. Each has a specific role and a particular set of attributes which they bring to the classroom. Content experts are those who are well acquainted with the subject. Either through years of practical experience or involvement with research, these individuals fully understand the topic they are discussing. On the other hand, the process expert is trained in the art of teaching. These individuals have a working knowledge of the subject for discussion but they will also have a concrete knowledge of facilitation and how to direct the student to assess their knowledge gaps and seek out answers on their own. Tutors may be totally content focused, totally process focused or some combination of the two, bringing with them prior personal and professional experience.

== Process experts ==
The work of Malcolm Knowles discusses which type of tutor is better suited to address the needs of adult learners. Knowles work assumes basic concepts about adult learners:

- Adult learners are independent and self-directing
- They have accumulated experience which is a resource for learning
- They value learning that integrates with the demands of their daily life
- They are more interested in problem centered approaches than subject centered ones
- They are more often internally motivated rather than externally motivated.

Gerald Grow developed the Staged Self Directed Learning Model (SSDLM) as a tool to assist teachers to help learners work toward more self-directed learning. Phillip Candy also studied ways to assist learners to be self-directed. Process experts would be guided by these educational theorists.

== Content experts ==
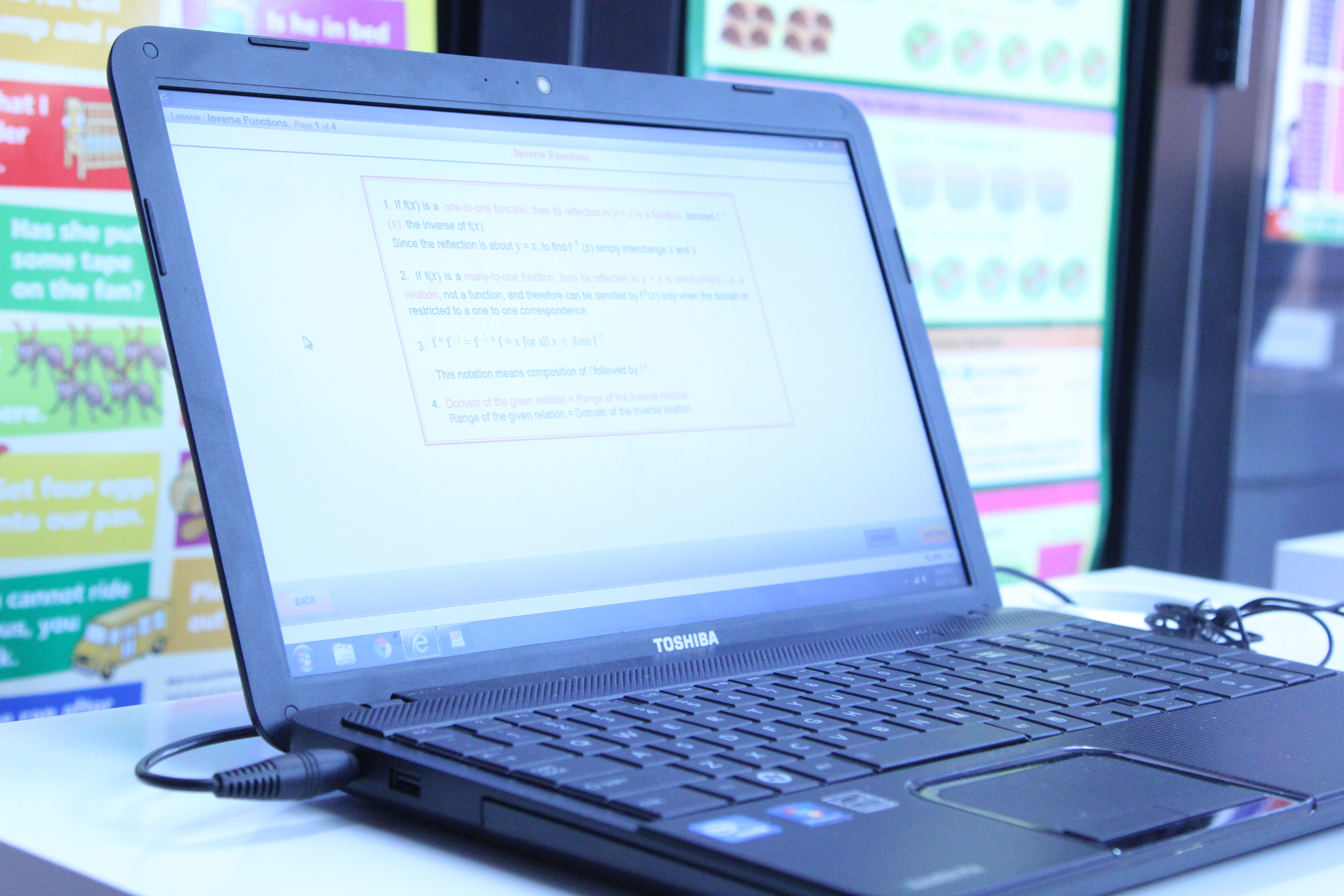
Computer based learning at a tuition centre

Research on the topic of content expertise has been done in the field of medical education. Traditionally, medical education was delivered in large lecture format by content experts. In the 1960s, Problem-based learning was first introduced at McMaster University in Ontario, Canada. Problem-based learning involves small groups working within a tutorial system. Students are encouraged to brainstorm within the group and generate questions based on the scenario they are working on. Problem-based learning fosters self-directed learning, with the teacher taking on a new role as a facilitator, using their expertise only subtly and sparingly. This style of learning is built on collaborative learning work theory. Students with a common interest are encouraged to reflect, share their thoughts with their peers and develop analytical thinking and communication skills during the process. The break from the true collaborative approach is in having an authority figure present.

Supporters of the truly collaborative approach feel that there is no need for that authority to be a content expert. However, studies conducted at several medical schools across Canada, the US and Europe dispute this idea. For example, in an analysis of student performance following small group experiences with experts and non expert tutors, students at the University of Michigan Medical School rated their experiences with content experts significantly higher than those led by non-experts. They felt that even though an expert tutor may ask the same questions as a non-expert tutor, that the expert was more inclined to ask the questions at the most opportune time and was better able to reframe the question in a way that was more valuable to the students. Ultimately, the students who were assigned to the groups led by content experts scored significantly higher on their final exam. In another study, conducted at Dalhousie University in Halifax, Canada, it was determined that expert tutors use their knowledge to ask more effective questions and are better equipped to keep the groups from floundering. This raises the question of whether a process expert can adequately assess student progress and determine when intervention is optimal and beneficial.

== Effectiveness ==
While ongoing debate and research on this topic continues, several common threads have evolved and opinions on the effectiveness of this approach include:

- Effective tutors for self-directed learning are those who only make appropriate interruptions.
- Effective tutors need content expertise coupled with facilitation training.
- The tutor's challenge is to avoid dispensing facts.
- The effective tutor needs to be empathetic to student needs and capable of motivation.

Given these determinants, one dares to ask if the issue is actually content expertise versus process expertise or rather what is the minimum requirement of each component which would produce the most effective tutor?
