= Felice =

Felice is a unisex given name. It is a common name in Italian, where it is equivalent to Felix. Notable people with the name include:

== Arts and entertainment ==
=== Acting ===
- Felice Andreasi (1928–2005), Italian actor
- Felice Farina (born 1954), Italian film director
- Felice Jankell, Swedish actress
- Felice Minotti (1887–1963), Italian actor
- Felice Orlandi (1925–2003), Italian-American actor
- Felice Schachter (born 1963), American actress

=== Music ===
- Felice Alessandri (1747–1798), Italian musician
- Felice Anerio (c. 1560–1614), Italian composer
- Felice Blangini (1781–1841), Italian composer
- Felice Bryant (1925–2003), American songwriter
- Felice Chiusano (1922–1990), Italian singer
- Felice DeMatteo (1866–1929), Italian-American composer
- Felice Giardini (1716–1796), Italian musician
- Felice Lattuada (1882–1962), Italian composer
- Felice Romani (1788–1865), Italian librettist, poet, and scholar
- Felice Rosser, American actor and musician
- Felice Taylor (born 1948), American singer
- Felice Varesi (1813–1889), French-Italian singer

=== Painting ===
- Felice Abrami (1872–1919), Italian painter
- Felice Boscaratti (1721–1807), Italian painter
- Felice Boselli (1650–1732), Italian painter
- Felice Cappelletti (1656–1738), Italian painter
- Felice Carena (1879–1966), Italian painter
- Felice Casorati (1883–1963), Italian painter
- Felice Cerruti Bauduc (1818–1896), Italian painter
- Felice Cervetti (1718–1779), Italian painter
- Felice Cignani (1660–1724), Italian painter
- Felice Damiani (1530–1608), Italian painter
- Felice Ficherelli (1605–1660), Italian painter
- Felice Giani (1758–1823), Italian painter
- Felice Ludovisi (1917–2012), Italian painter
- Felice Pazner Malkin (born 1929), Israeli artist
- Felice Riccio (1542–1605), Italian painter
- Felice Schiavoni (1803–1881), Italian painter
- Felice Scotto (active early 15th century), Italian painter
- Felice Torelli (1667–1748), Italian painter
- Felice Varini (born 1952), Swiss artist
- Felice Giuseppe Vertua (1820–1862), Italian painter
- Felice Vinelli (c. 1774–1825), Italian painter

=== Other arts and entertainment ===
- Felice Arena, Australian children's author and illustrator
- Felice Beato (c. 1832–1909), Italian-British photographer
- Leo Buscaglia (1924–1998), American author and motivational speaker, born Felice Buscaglia
- Felice Cavallotti (1842–1898), Italian politician, poet and author
- Felice Feliciano (1433–1479), Italian calligrapher
- Felice Damiano, stage name of Dré Steemans (1954–2009), Belgian radio and TV host
- Felice Noordhoff (born 2000), Dutch fashion model
- Felice delle Piane (born 1940), Italian art historian
- Felice Polanzani (c. 1700–after 1771), Italian engraver
- Felice Quinto (1929–2010), Italian photographer
- Felice Rix-Ueno (1893–1967), Austrian textile artist

== Military, politics and law ==
- Felice Pasquale Baciocchi (1762–1841), Corsican nobleman and military officer
- Felice Besostri (1944–2024), Italian jurist and politician
- Felice Napoleone Canevaro (1838–1926), Italian admiral and politician
- Felice Casson (born 1953), Italian politician
- Felice Cavallotti (1842–1898), Italian politician and author
- Felice Chilanti (1914–1982), Italian journalist and resistance member
- Felice Cornicola, 8th-century Venetian statesman
- Felice D. Gaer (born 1946), American human rights activist
- Felice Guarneri (1882–1955), Italian economist and politician
- Felice Orsini (1819–1858), Italian revolutionary
- Felice Platone (1896–1962), Italian lawyer, politician, and resistance member
- Felice Schragenheim (1922–1944), German Jewish resistance fighter

== Religion ==
- Felice Cavagnis (1841–1906), Italian canon lawyer and cardinal
- Felice Figliucci (c. 1525–c. 1590), Italian humanist, philosopher, and theologian
- Felice Leonardo (1915–2015), Italian bishop
- Felice Antonio Monaco (1611–1667), Italian cleric, Bishop of Martirano
- Pope Sixtus V (1521–1590), born Felice Peretti di Montalto

== Science, mathematics and technology ==
- Felice Bisleri (1851–1921), Italian pharmacist
- Felice Casorati (mathematician) (1835–1890), Italian mathematician
- Felice Fontana (1730–1805), Italian physicist
- Felice Frankel, American science photographer
- Felice Giordano (1825–1892), Italian engineer and geologist
- Felice Ippolito (1915–1997), Italian engineer and geologist
- Felice Lieh-Mak (born 1941), Hong Kong psychiatrist
- Felice Matteucci (1808–1887), Italian hydraulic engineer

== Sports ==
=== Association football ===
- Felice Berardo (1888–1956), Italian footballer
- Felice Borel (1914–1993), Italian footballer
- Felice Cavaliere (born 1981), Italian footballer
- Felice Centofanti (born 1969), Italian footballer
- Félix Demaría (1912–?), Argentine footballer, also known as Felice
- Felice Evacuo (born 1982), Italian footballer
- Felice Gasperi (1903–1982), Italian footballer
- Virgilio Levratto (1904–1968), Italian footballer, sometimes referred to by his middle name, Felice
- Felice Mancini (born 1965), Italian footballer and coach
- Felice Mariani (footballer) (born 1918), Italian footballer
- Felice Mazzu (born 1966), Belgian football manager
- Felice Natalino (born 1992), Italian footballer
- Felice Piccolo (born 1983), Italian footballer
- Felice Prevete (born 1987), Italian footballer
- Félix Romano (1894–1970), Argentine footballer, also known as Felice, who played for the French and Italian national teams
- Felice Soldini (1915–1971), Swiss footballer
- Felice Vecchione (born 1991), Italian-German footballer

=== Auto and motorcycle racing ===
- Felice Benasedo (born 1922), Italian motorcycle racer
- Felice Bonetto (1903–1953), Italian racing driver
- Felice Nazzaro (1881–1940), Italian racing driver
- Felice Tedeschi (born 1962), Italian racing driver

=== Rowing ===
- Felice Chow (born 1977), Trinidad and Tobago rower
- Felice Fanetti (1914–1974), Italian rower
- Felice Mueller (born 1989), American rower

=== Other sports ===
- Felice Darioli (born 1947), Italian cross-country skier
- Felice De Nicolo (born 1942), Italian skier
- Felice Gimondi (born 1942), Italian cyclist
- Felice Herrig (born 1984), American martial artist
- Felice Mariani (judoka) (born 1954), Italian judoka
- Felice Puttini (born 1967), Swiss cyclist
- Felice Rama, Italian rugby union coach
- Felice Torza (1920–1983), American golfer

== Writing ==
- Felice Chilanti (1914–1982), Italian journalist and resistance member
- Felice Newman, American author and sex educator
- Felice Picano (born 1944), American writer
- Felice Schwartz (1925–1996), American feminist writer

== Other ==
- Felice Bauer (1887–1960), Silesian woman who was engaged to Franz Kafka
- Felice Mario Boano, Italian automobile coachbuilder
- Felice Colombo (born 1937), Italian businessman
- Felice Duffy, American attorney and public speaker
- Felice Lifshitz, American historian
- Felice della Rovere (c. 1483–1536), an illegitimate daughter of Pope Julius II
- Felix Pedro (1858–1910), Italian immigrant, born Felice Pedroni, who discovered gold in Alaska

== See also ==
- Felise, a list of people with the given name or surname
- Félicien, a list of people with the given name
