= List of law schools in Connecticut =

This is a list of law schools in Connecticut, arranged in alphabetical order.

Law School	City/Town	Founded
Litchfield Law School	Litchfield	1773 (closed 1833)
Quinnipiac University School of Law	North Haven	1995
University of Connecticut School of Law	Hartford	1921
Yale Law School	New Haven	1843
