= Soldini (disambiguation) =

Soldini is a surname of Italian origin.

Soldini may also refer to:

- Soldini, Santa Fe, town in Argentina
- Calzaturificio fratelli soldini, Italian footwear manufacturer

== See also ==
- Soldina
