= New Battlefront Foundation =

Nonprofit organization

- Type: 501(C)(3) Corporation #27-1989831
- Purpose: "To provide a free resource to aid in the transition of veterans from military to civilian life by helping them find jobs, providing a network of other veterans, and providing job placement assistance."
- Headquarters: New Haven, Connecticut
- Staff: 5 Full-time Employees

The New Battlefront Foundation (NBF) is a nonprofit organization whose mission is to aid veterans of the United States Armed Forces in their transition from military to civilian life. The New Battlefront Foundation (NWB) was "founded and operated by a disabled combat veteran" in order to "provide help navigating some of the troubles faced during a veteran's 'new battle' found upon returning home."

== History ==
The New Battlefront Foundation was founded in 2010 by Ryan Cleckner, a current law student and former United States Army Ranger, Sniper, and combat veteran dedicated to raising veterans' issues awareness who was featured as one of the "Dozen Who Make a Difference" by the Connecticut Law Tribune.

== Services ==
The New Battlefront Foundation serves as a source for veterans to receive help and for volunteers to help provide the assistance needed. The United States Department of Veterans Affairs provides support to veterans and is overseen by the United States Senate Committee on Veterans' Affairs. Veterans may receive assistance from the NBF in 3 main resource areas, Education, Employment, and Healthcare.

=== Education ===
The GI Bill and its benefits are explained to veterans as they are given help applying for and preparing for college. Volunteers provide assistance filling out the required paperwork and the veteran network supports veterans throughout their education.

=== Employment ===
A free job listing and searching database is provided for veterans to find jobs and potential employers to hire veterans. Resume writing assistance and job preparation advice is given.

=== Healthcare ===
Veterans are provided help navigating the Veterans Health Administration via informational articles, community support, and volunteer advocates. Assistance filing a disability claim and getting enrolled in the health care system is provided. A special emphasis on PTSD counseling is provided.
