= Michael van der Veen =

American attorney (born 1963)

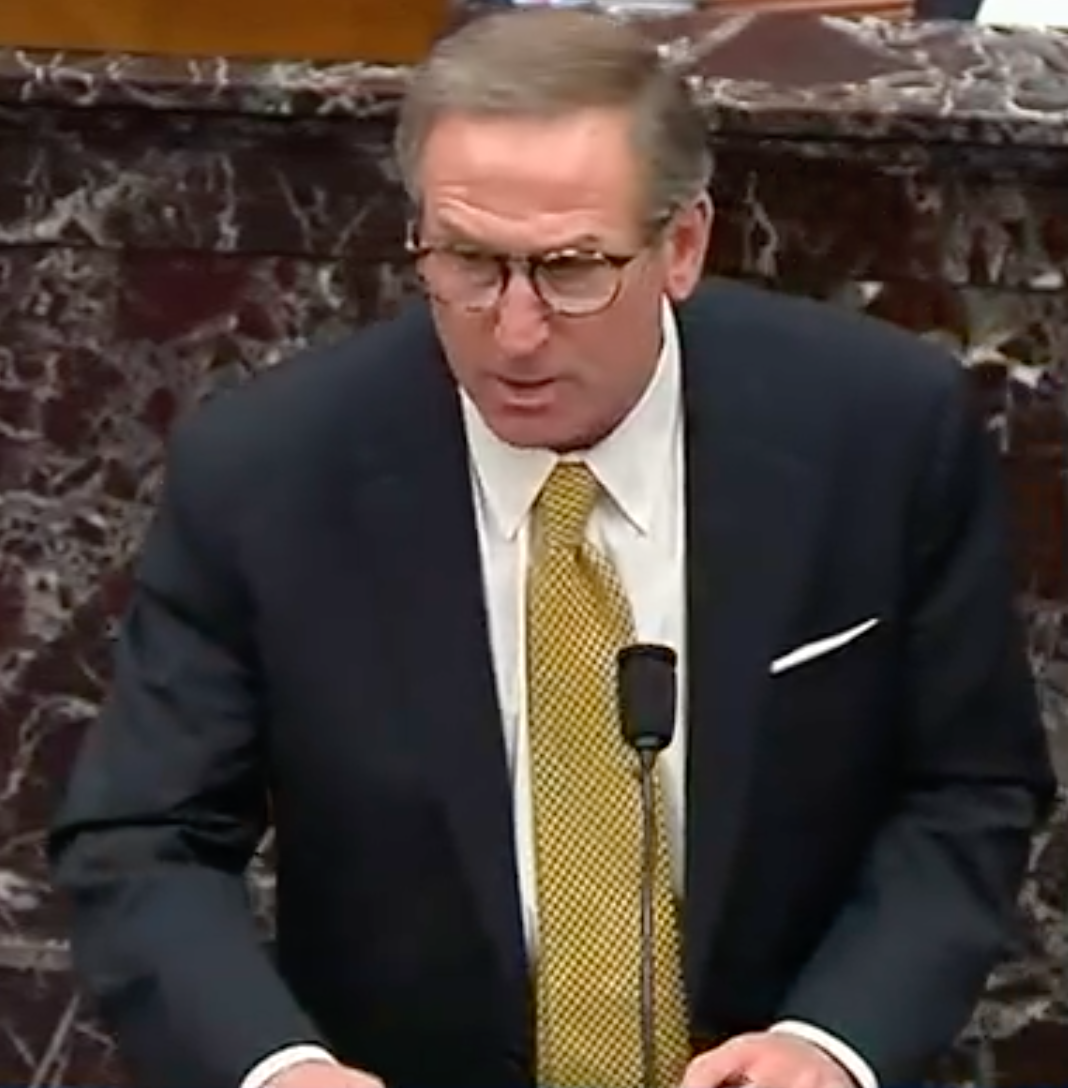
- van der Veen at Donald Trump's second impeachment trial (2021)
- Born: Michael Thomas van der Veen; September 16, 1963 (age 63); Norwich, Connecticut, U.S.
- Education: Ohio Wesleyan University (BA); University of Bridgeport (JD); Temple University (LLM)
- Occupation: Attorney
- Known for: Second impeachment of Donald Trump
- Spouse: Marion Murphy
- Children: 2
- Website: mtvlaw.com

Michael Thomas van der Veen (born September 16, 1963) is an American attorney who specializes in civil litigation and criminal defense. He represented then former president Donald Trump during his second impeachment trial in the United States Senate, which resulted in acquittal on February 13, 2021.

== Early life and education ==
Michael Thomas van der Veen was born September 16, 1963 in Norwich, Connecticut. He was raised in the Greater Boston area. He is the maternal grandson of John Shields, a Connecticut attorney who served as president of the Connecticut Bar Association.

van der Veen attended Choate Rosemary Hall in Connecticut, graduating in 1981. He next attended Ohio Wesleyan University and graduated in 1985. He attended law school at the University of Bridgeport School of Law, receiving a Juris Doctor degree in 1988. He also received an LLM degree in trial advocacy from Temple University School of Law.

== Career ==
van der Veen has been an attorney since 1988. He is a founder of the Philadelphia criminal and personal injury law firm, van der Veen, Hartshorn & Levin. His litigation practice encompasses criminal defense and civil litigation, with a focus on personal injury matters. He has represented plaintiffs in a range of serious injury cases, including motor vehicle and construction-related incidents, product liability claims, and allegations of police misconduct. He has also represented defendants in criminal proceedings involving felony and misdemeanor charges.

Earlier in his career, van der Veen gained attention for representing an AIDS-activism organization in a criminal case challenging hypodermic needle possession laws, successfully advancing a necessity defense that resulted in acquittal and contributed to broader policy discussions regarding public health interventions.

Several large civil litigation outcomes associated with van der Veen’s practice include a reported $31.5 million judgment for a client rendered paraplegic in a motor vehicle collision, a $10 million settlement on behalf of a child struck by a tractor-trailer, and other multi-million-dollar recoveries in bicycle and automobile accident cases.

In August 2020, van der Veen represented a client suing President Donald Trump, alleging that Trump's attacks on the U.S. Postal Service were unsupported by evidence. In 2022, Trump's Save America political action committee paid van der Veen, Hartshorn & Levin $1.4 million in legal fees.

Other high-profile clients have included Brandon "Bam" Margera, Phil Nordo, the estate of Fanta Bility, and multiple defendants charged in connection with the January 6, 2021, attack on the U.S. Capitol.

== Trump impeachment trial ==
van der Veen was selected to serve as co-counsel, alongside William J. Brennan, Bruce L. Castor, Jr., and David I. Schoen, on the defense team for then former president Donald Trump during Trump’s second impeachment trial. On February 12 and 13, 2021, van der Veen presented arguments for the defense of Donald Trump at the former president's second impeachment trial. During the proceedings, some senators and observers reacted audibly when van der Veen stated that he would seek depositions of numerous individuals as part of the trial process, including Speaker Nancy Pelosi and Vice President Kamala Harris. van der Veen responded by stating that such procedures were consistent with civil litigation practice.

Commentators and media outlets offered mixed assessments of van der Veen’s performance during the trial, with some critics alleging inaccuracies or the use of misleading media materials, while others emphasized the defense’s procedurally focused approach and adherence to constitutional and evidentiary standards.

At the conclusion of the trial, the Senate voted 57–43 to convict Donald Trump of inciting insurrection in the January 6, 2021 attack on the U.S. Capitol. Trump was acquitted because the U.S. Constitution requires that two-thirds of the Senate must vote for conviction. Seven Republican senators voted to convict Donald Trump, the largest bipartisan vote for an impeachment conviction of a U.S. president.

Following the trial, van der Veen participated in a televised interview with CBS News anchor Lana Zak, during which the two disagreed over the characterization of evidence presented at trial. The interview ended abruptly when van der Veen removed his microphone and exited the set. van der Veen also appeared on Hannity, hosted by Sean Hannity, where he discussed the defense’s legal strategy and criticized the impeachment proceedings. During the interview, he argued that the case against Donald Trump lacked sufficient evidentiary support and characterized the trial as politically motivated.

van der Veen was played by Pete Davidson in the cold open of Saturday Night Live on February 13, 2021. After the trial, his residence and law office were the subject of protests and vandalism, which were reported by local and national media.

== Personal life ==
van der Veen lives in Chester County, in the Greater Philadelphia area. He is married to Marion van der Veen (née Murphy), and together they have two children.

van der Veen spends summers in Boothbay Harbor, Maine, where his family owns and operates a marina and waterfront restaurant.
