= Felician =

Felician is a masculine given name which may refer to:

- Felician of Foligno (c. 160–c. 250), Christian martyr, saint and Bishop of Foligno
- Felician (died c. 297), Christian martyr and saint in ancient Rome
- Saint Felician, late 3rd century ancient Roman soldier, martyr and saint converted by Victor of Marseilles to Christianity
- Felicianus of Musti, 4th-century Bishop of Musti in Numidia, Roman North Africa
- Felician (archbishop of Esztergom) (died 1139 or later), Catholic archbishop
- Felician Záh (died 1330), Hungarian noble, soldier and failed assassin of King Charles I of Hungary and his family

== See also ==
- Felician Sisters, a Catholic religious order
- Feliciano (disambiguation)
- Félicien
- Felix (disambiguation)
