= Soldini =

- Language: Italian

Origin
- Region of origin: Florence, Italy

Other names
- Variant forms: Soldano, Soldani, Sodano, Soldaini, Soldan, Soldanieri, Sodani, Soltano, Soltani and Sotano

Soldini is a surname which was first used in Florence when it was the capital of the Kingdom of Italy.

People with the surname are as follows:

- Antonio Soldini (1854–1933), Swiss-Italian sculptor
- Felice Soldini (1915–1971), Swiss football player
- Jean Soldini (born 1956), Swiss philosopher
- Pier Angelo Soldini (1910–1974), Italian novelist and journalist
- Silvio Soldini (born 1958), Italian film director
