= Quinnipiac University School of Law =

Law school in North Haven, Connecticut, US

Coordinates: 41.42007°N 72.89420°W

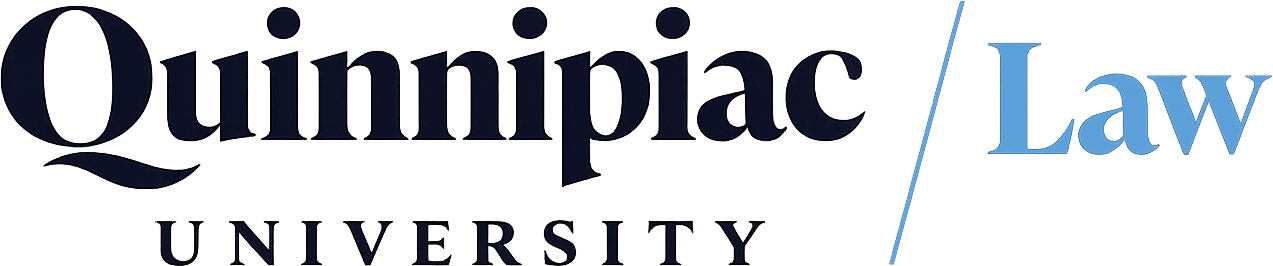
- Parent school: Quinnipiac University
- Established: 1992; 34 years ago
- School type: Private
- Dean: Brian Gallini
- Location: North Haven, Connecticut, US
- Enrollment: 384
- Faculty: 32 FT, 97 PT
- USNWR ranking: 136 (tie) (2026)
- Bar pass rate: 75.44% (2025 first-time takers)
- Website: law.quinnipiac.edu

Quinnipiac University School of Law is the law school of Quinnipiac University located in North Haven, Connecticut. It is a member of the Association of American Law Schools, and ranked tied at No. 136 by U.S. News & World Report law school rankings in 2026.

According to Quinnipiac's ABA-required disclosures, 56.4% (57 out of 101 members) of the Class of 2021 obtained full-time, long-term, JD-required employment (i.e., as attorneys) nine months after graduation, excluding solo-practitioners.

== History ==
Quinnipiac Law traces its origins to 1972, when the Wethersfield School of Law was first established in Hartford. Wethersfield Law School moved to Bridgeport and became affiliated with the University of Bridgeport in 1977, operating thereafter as the University of Bridgeport School of Law.

The law school operated during a period of financial instability at the University of Bridgeport in the late 80s and early 90s. In 1991, the law school faculty voted to separate from the university and pursue affiliation with Quinnipiac College.

At the time, Terence H. Benbow served as dean of the law school and publicly supported the transition to Quinnipiac. In August 1992, the American Bar Association approved the transfer of the law school to Quinnipiac College, allowing the institution to continue operations without interruption of accreditation. The school subsequently became the Quinnipiac College School of Law. Following Quinnipiac College’s transition to university status in 2000, the institution adopted its current name, the Quinnipiac University School of Law.

== Academics ==
The university offers three degree programs: The Juris Doctor (J.D.), the J.D./Master of Business Administration (MBA) double degree program, and the Master of Laws (LLM) in health law. Students may have concentrations in civil advocacy and dispute resolution, criminal law and advocacy, family law, health law, intellectual property, tax law, and workplace law. In Fall 2017, the school began offering a new concentration in international law and policy.

The school offers both externships and clinics to students after completion of their first year. Students may take these courses for experiential credits as required by the ABA. Externships are coordinated by the school, and are offered in areas such as corporate counsel, criminal justice, family and juvenile law, judicial, legal services, legislative, mediation, public interest, field placement II. There are in-house clinical programs. Civil justice, tax, advanced (all areas), evening, defense appellate, and prosecution appellate clinics, are all offered at the law school. Other learning opportunities include summer study at Trinity College, Dublin in Dublin, Ireland and other opportunities to study abroad.

As of 2022, the law school had an enrollment of 384 students. There were 32 full-time faculty members, and 97 non-full-time faculty members, with a student-to-faculty ratio of 12 to 1, and the typical first-year section size was 55.

=== Admissions ===
For the class admitted in 2022, out of 1016 applicants, 681 (67.03%) were accepted, and 122 (12.01%) of accepted students enrolled. The median incoming GPA for full-time students was 3.57, and the median LSAT score for full-time students was 152. The 25th–75th percentile range of LSAT scores was 149-156 for the day division (full-time) program, and 149-158 for the evening division (part-time) program.

=== Rankings ===
The 2025 U.S. News & World Report law school rankings placed Quinnipiac tied at 136 out of 195 schools.

== Bar passage ==
In 2025, the passage rate for Quinnipiac's first-time bar examination takers was 75.44% while the average first-time passage rate for all ABA approved schools was 71.29%. For those graduating in 2020, 91.60% of Quinnipiac graduates who sat for a bar examination within two years passed.

== Employment ==
According to Quinnipiac's official 2021 ABA-required disclosures, 56.4% (57 out of 101 members) of the Class of 2021 obtained full-time, long-term, JD-required employment nine months after graduation, excluding solo-practitioners. Quinnipiac's Law School Transparency under-employment score is 17.8%, indicating the percentage of the Class of 2021 unemployed, pursuing an additional degree, or working in a non-professional, short-term, or part-time job nine months after graduation.

== Costs ==
The total cost of attendance (indicating the cost of tuition, fees, and living expenses) at Quinnipiac for the 2022-2023 academic year is $79,042. The Law School Transparency estimated debt-financed cost of attendance for three years is $259,610. Annual tuition for full-time students is $52,820 plus $980 in fees. Tuition for part-time students is $1,845 per credit plus $990 annual fees. Admitted applicants are also automatically considered for merit-based grants and scholarships during the admissions process. Traditionally, merit scholarships range from $10,000 to $40,000 per year, and may be renewed at 100% annually, if the student remains in the top 50 percent of his or her class. The Dean's Fellowship is typically awarded to 8-10 students per year and covers full tuition.

== Facilities ==
The 50,000-square-foot (4,600 m^{2}), two-level Law Library is recognized by the American Institute of Architects and the Library Administration and Management Association. The law library houses more than 450,000 volumes.

Located within the School of Law Center, the Grand Courtroom is designed as a place where students can conduct a mock trial before a judge and jury and make appellate arguments to a panel of judges. On several occasions it has hosted sessions of the Connecticut Supreme Court and Connecticut Appellate Court.

== Student competition teams ==
Quinnipiac University School of Law has several student competition teams, including a Mock Trial Society, Moot Court Society, and Society for Dispute Resolution.

Mock Trial Society

The Mock Trial Society hosts two competitions each fall - an in-house intramural competition for students and an invitational competition against various schools. The society also attends numerous competitions throughout the year. While each of the school's competition teams have enjoyed success over the years, the Mock Trial Society remains Quinnipiac's most decorated organization.

Society for Dispute Resolution

The Society for Dispute Resolution is the largest competition team at Quinnipiac, sending students to competitions in Negotiation, Mediation, Arbitration, and Client Counseling around the country. In 2019–2020, they hosted the American Bar Association's Client Counseling National Competition remotely during the onset of the COVID-19 pandemic, where their team ended up winning first place.

== Publications ==
The following law reviews are published at Quinnipiac University School of Law:

- Quinnipiac Law Review
- Quinnipiac Health Law Journal
- Quinnipiac Probate Law Journal (formerly the Connecticut Probate Law Journal, once the official reporter of probate decisions in the State of Connecticut)

== Notable alumni ==
=== University of Bridgeport School of Law (1977-1991) ===
- Joe Tacopina, defense attorney whose clients included Alex Rodriguez, Joran van der Sloot, and Donald Trump
- Michael van der Veen, criminal and personal injury attorney; represented Donald Trump during his second impeachment trial

=== Quinnipiac University School of Law (1992-Present) ===
- Arunan Arulampalam, mayor of Hartford
- Gennaro Bizzarro, former Connecticut state senator
- Ryan Cleckner, former United States Army Ranger sniper with the 75th Ranger Regiment and author of the Long Range Shooting Handbook
- Felice Duffy, lawyer, public speaker, former Yale soccer coach
- Herron Gaston, Connecticut state senator, University of Bridgeport vice-president, self-published author, philanthropist.
