= Second impeachment trial of Donald Trump =

2021 trial in the US Senate

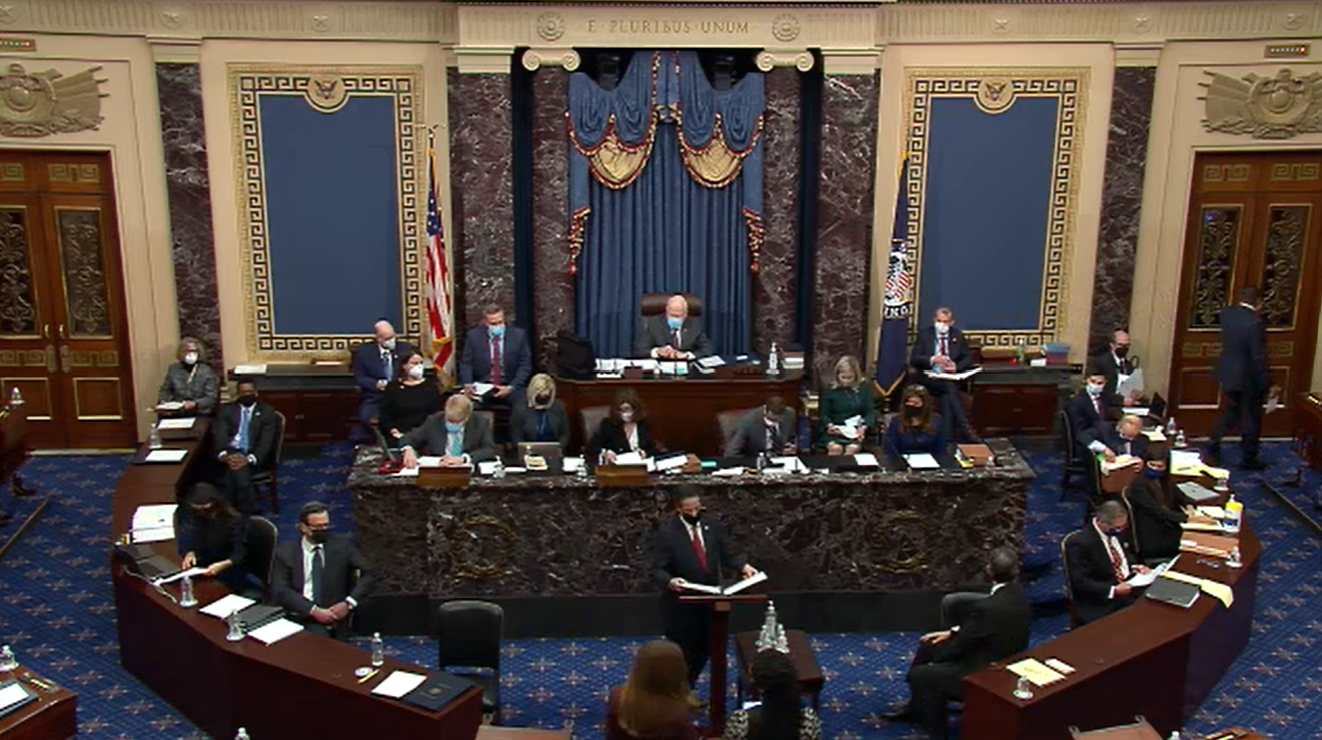
- President pro tempore Patrick Leahy presides over the second impeachment trial of Donald Trump.
- Date: January 26 – February 13, 2021 (2 weeks and 4 days)
- Accused: Donald Trump, former president of the United States
- Presiding officer: President pro tempore Patrick Leahy
- House managers: Jamie Raskin (lead manager); Joaquin Castro; David Cicilline; Madeleine Dean; Diana DeGette; Ted Lieu; Joe Neguse; Stacey Plaskett; Eric Swalwell
- Defense counsel: William J. Brennan; Bruce Castor; David Schoen; Michael van der Veen
- Outcome: Acquitted by the U.S. Senate, 57 guilty, 43 not guilty (10 short of 67 needed to convict)
- Charges: Incitement of insurrection
- Cause: Trump's conduct before and during the U.S. Capitol attack; Trump–Raffensperger phone call

The second impeachment trial of Donald Trump, the 45th president of the United States (in office from 2017 to 2021), began on February 9, 2021, and concluded with his acquittal on February 13. Trump had been impeached for the second time by the House of Representatives on January 13, 2021. The House adopted one article of impeachment against Trump: incitement of insurrection. He is the only U.S. president and only federal official to be impeached twice. He was impeached by the House seven days prior to the expiration of his term and the inauguration of Joe Biden. Because he left office before the trial, this was the first impeachment trial of a former president. The article of impeachment addressed Trump's attempts to overturn the 2020 presidential election results (including his claims of election fraud and his efforts to pressure election officials in Georgia) and stated that Trump incited the attack on the Capitol in Washington, D.C., while Congress was convened to count the electoral votes and certify the victory of Joe Biden and Kamala Harris.

At the beginning of the trial, Senator Rand Paul forced a vote to dismiss the impeachment charge on the basis that it was unconstitutional to try a former president, arguing that impeachment only applies to current federal officers and that the punishment of removal from office was moot under the circumstances. Supporters of proceeding with the trial argued that the Constitution also permits disqualification from holding future office, which the House had requested in its article of impeachment. The motion was defeated in a 55–45 vote, with all Democrats, both independents, and five Republicans (Susan Collins of Maine, Lisa Murkowski of Alaska, Mitt Romney of Utah, Ben Sasse of Nebraska, and Pat Toomey of Pennsylvania) voting against the motion. This was the first time that a former president had been tried, and only the second time the Senate tried someone who had already left office, after Secretary of War William W. Belknap in 1876. Jamie Raskin was the lead impeachment manager and the primary author – along with Representative David Cicilline and Representative Ted Lieu – of the impeachment article, which charged Trump with inciting an insurrection by sparking the Capitol attack. Joaquin Castro, Eric Swalwell, Madeleine Dean, and Stacey Plaskett also assisted in delivering the oral arguments for conviction.

Trump's defense was led by Michael van der Veen, a personal injury lawyer from Philadelphia, along with David Schoen and Bruce Castor. Van der Veen's style and substance during the trial drew ridicule and criticism from many, with gasps and laughter in the Senate when he stated that he would seek to depose at least 100 people at his Philadelphia office, including Speaker of the House of Representatives Nancy Pelosi and Vice President Kamala Harris. Trump had originally hired Butch Bowers and Deborah Barbier to represent him, but they quit along with three other lawyers after "the former president wanted the lawyers representing him to focus on his allegations of mass election fraud" and his false claim that "the election was stolen from him."

At the conclusion of the trial, the Senate voted 57–43 to convict Trump of inciting insurrection, falling 10 votes short of the two-thirds majority required by the Constitution, and Trump was therefore acquitted. Seven Republican senators joined all Democratic and independent senators in voting to convict Trump, the largest bipartisan vote for an impeachment conviction of a U.S. president or former U.S. president. After the vote on the acquittal, Mitch McConnell said, "There's no question that President Trump is practically and morally responsible for provoking the events of the day." but he voted against conviction due to his interpretation of the United States Constitution.

== Background ==
Under the U.S. Constitution, the House has the sole power of impeachment (Article I, Section 2, Clause 5), and after that action has been taken, the Senate has "the sole Power to try all Impeachments" (Article I, Section 3, Clause 6). Trump was the third U.S. president to face a Senate impeachment trial, after Andrew Johnson and Bill Clinton. Trump is the only federal official to be impeached twice.

The Senate impeachment trial procedures are set forth under rules adopted in 1986, although specific rules are adopted for each trial, with the Senate majority leader exercising considerable power in setting the procedures.

=== House impeachment ===
On January 11, 2021, Representatives David Cicilline, Jamie Raskin, and Ted Lieu introduced an article of impeachment against Trump, charging him with "incitement of insurrection" in urging his supporters to march on the Capitol building. The article stated that Trump had committed high crimes and misdemeanors by making several statements that "encouraged – and foreseeably resulted in – lawless action" that interfered with Congress' constitutional duty to certify the election. It said he had "threatened the integrity of the democratic system, interfered with the peaceful transition of power, and imperiled a coequal branch of Government" in a way that rendered him "a threat to national security, democracy, and the Constitution". A total of 218 of the 222 House Democrats co-sponsored the article of impeachment, assuring its passage.

The House passed the article of impeachment on January 13, 2021, by a 232–197 vote. All 222 Democrats voted to impeach, joined by 10 Republicans (including House Republican Conference chairwoman Liz Cheney). Four Republicans did not vote, and the other 197 Republicans voted no.

=== Trial delay and planning ===
In the days following Trump's second impeachment, then-Senate Majority Leader Mitch McConnell (R-KY) argued that, because the Senate was in pro forma sessions until January 19, it could not take on any business without the unanimous consent of its members. According to Senate rules, once articles of impeachment are presented to the Senate, the Senate trial must begin the next day. Had the article of impeachment been immediately transmitted to the Senate, Trump's trial thus would have begun on Inauguration Day, after Joe Biden was sworn in.

Then-Senate Minority Leader Chuck Schumer (D-NY) called on McConnell to bring the Senate back into session immediately after the House transmitted the article of impeachment, and also to advance the confirmation process for Biden's cabinet nominees so that the incoming administration's team would be in place on day one. Some, including House Majority Whip Jim Clyburn (D-SC), initially suggested that the House might transmit the article of impeachment to the Senate at a later date (possibly after Biden's first 100 days as president), giving the Senate time to consider Biden's legislative program and confirm his nominees. However, House Democrats opposed a delay, stating that Trump remained a danger while he was in office, and House Majority Leader Steny Hoyer (D-MD) said on January 14 that the article of impeachment would be transmitted to the Senate without delay.

After the House impeached Trump, President-elect Biden stated, "I hope that the Senate leadership will find a way to deal with their constitutional responsibilities on impeachment while also working on the other urgent business of this nation." Biden said his priority is enacting a new stimulus bill and rebuilding the economy. He discussed with McConnell the possibility of "bifurcating" the Senate calendar, allowing the trial to proceed while also allowing other business (such as nominations and legislation) to move forward without delay. Under this plan, the Senate could split its days between the trial and other business, rather than having all its time consumed by the trial. Former Senate Parliamentarian Alan Frumin said that Senate rules would permit such a course. McConnell told Biden that he would consult with the Senate parliamentarian. Schumer, who would replace McConnell as Senate majority leader, said that a Senate trial could begin immediately.

Law professor Ronald Krotoszynski wrote that the Senate could speed up impeachment proceedings (completing the process in a few days, rather than a few weeks) through a process akin to civil summary judgment. This would be permissible under the Constitution, which specifies that the Senate must "try" articles of impeachment and vote to convict (remove) by a two-thirds majority, but allows the Senate to set its own trial rules or procedures, as reaffirmed by the U.S. Supreme Court in Nixon v. United States (1993).

On January 22, 2021, it was announced that House Speaker Nancy Pelosi would transfer the article of impeachment to the Senate on January 25, with the Senate trial expected to be held during the week of February 8.

=== Impeachment trial of a former president ===
A Congressional Research Service report concluded "that while the matter is open to debate, the weight of scholarly authority agrees that former officials may be impeached and tried." Ahead of the trial, 150 legal scholars from across the political spectrum published a letter affirming "that the Constitution permits the impeachment, conviction, and disqualification of former officers, including presidents." Law professors Laurence H. Tribe and Stephen I. Vladeck argued that because removal from office is only one of the two possible consequences of a conviction (the other being disqualification from holding public office), the purpose of the trial is not nullified if the impeached person no longer holds public office. Gregg Nunziata, a former Republican lawyer for the Senate Judiciary Committee, similarly noted that because impeachment power includes the power to disqualify the person from federal office for life, allowing officeholders to evade this by resigning would render "this important punishment ... a nullity." Leading conservative lawyer Charles J. Cooper agreed, writing in the Wall Street Journal the weekend before the trial that there is no Constitutional prohibition against a post-presidency trial. Cardozo School of Law constitutional law professor Kate Shaw argued that "drafting history, impeachment practice, and basic constitutional design all point clearly in favor of the constitutionality of trying an ex-president." Legal scholar Brian C. Kalt, who has published research about late impeachments, stated, "In multiple cases, the House and Senate have proceeded as though they can impeach and try people who have already left office, and in one case the Senate took a specific vote to that effect."

There is precedent for impeaching and trying a federal official who already left office ("late impeachment"). In 1797, the House impeached Senator William Blount for conspiracy. The Senate tried him, even though it had already expelled him. In 1876, Secretary of War William W. Belknap resigned hours before the House voted for his impeachment on charges relating to his role in the trader post scandal, and the Senate proceeded to hold a trial, ruling by a vote of 37–29 that it did have jurisdiction after a challenge by Belknap's attorneys.

Before the trial began, most Republicans in the Senate argued that the Senate lacks the constitutional authority to conduct an impeachment trial of a former president. This argument was also made by former federal appellate judge J. Michael Luttig, as well as one of Trump's lawyers at his first impeachment trial, Harvard Law School professor emeritus Alan Dershowitz, and law professor Jonathan Turley, who testified in Trump's favor at his first trial.

Between the House impeachment vote and the beginning of the trial, former governor of Wisconsin Scott Walker claimed, "The U.S. Senate cannot convict a former President," which was Mostly False according to PolitiFact, which found 2 pieces of evidence in favor of the claim and 5 pieces of evidence against.

== Officers of the trial ==
=== Presiding officer ===
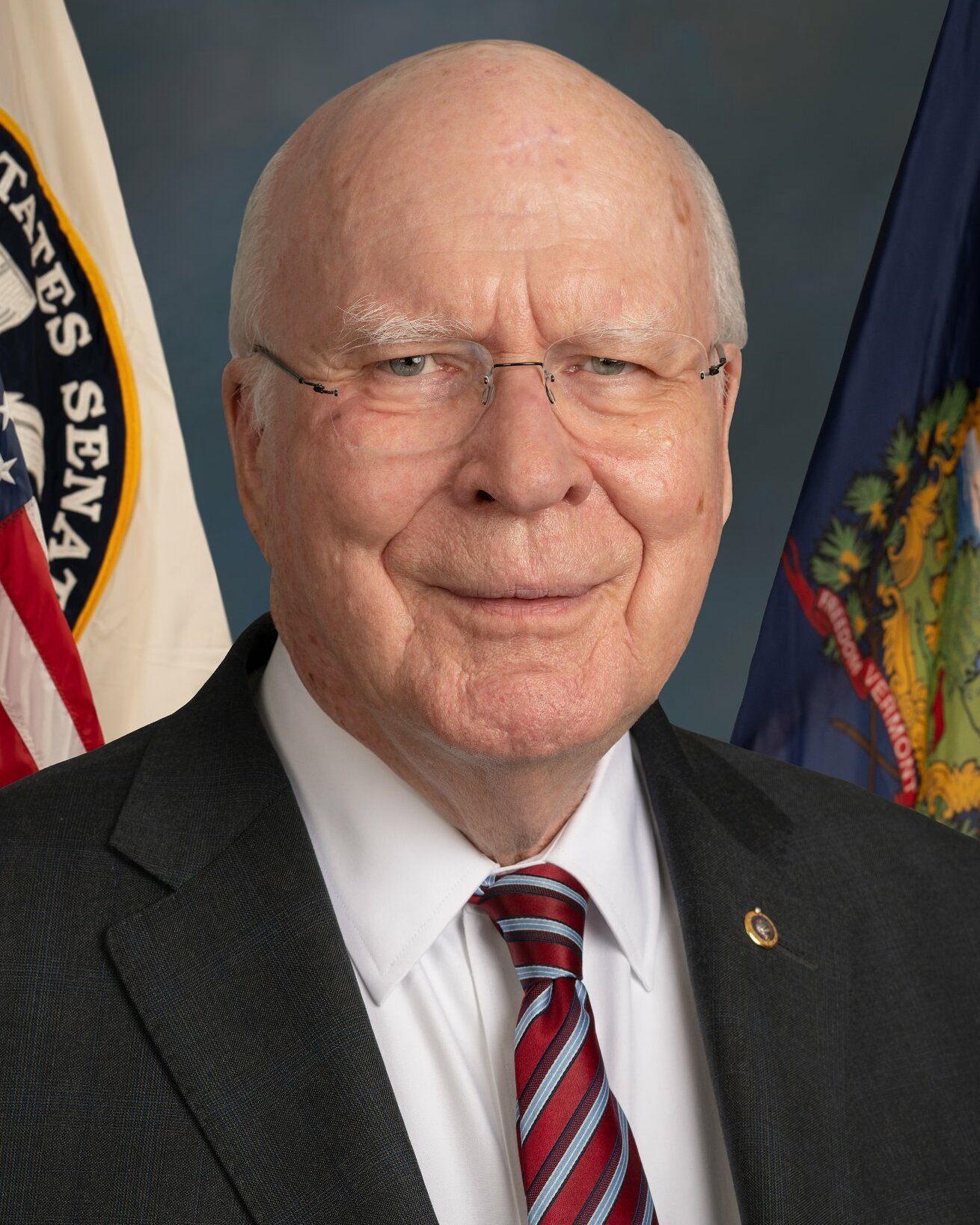
Patrick Leahy, senior U.S. senator from Vermont and President pro tempore of the Senate, presiding officer

Kamala Harris, Vice President of the United States and President of the Senate, for potential tie-breaking votes

Senate Majority Leader Chuck Schumer said in an interview with MSNBC's Rachel Maddow, that Chief Justice John Roberts had declined to preside over the trial because he believed that the chief justice only presided when the current president was tried. Patrick Leahy, president pro tempore of the Senate, presided over the trial, in place of Vice President Kamala Harris, the ex officio president of the Senate, who might have involved herself if any tie-breaking votes were needed.

Prior to the selection of Leahy as presiding officer, there was debate as to who constitutionally should hold that role. Article I, Section 3, Clause 6 of the U.S. Constitution states that the Senate has the sole power to try impeachments and that "When the President of the United States is tried the Chief Justice shall preside." Various commentators questioned whether the chief justice must preside over the trial of former presidents. Political scientist Keith Whittington noted that the issue is "unsettled, completely without precedent, and unspecific in existing Senate rules and precedents." The University of North Carolina law professor Michael Gerhardt, an expert on impeachment, said he believed that if the impeachment trial began after Trump left office, Harris, as opposed to Roberts, would preside. Conversely, University of Texas law professor Steve Vladeck said that "the question should be whether the impeached officer was President at the time of impeachment", and thus that Roberts should preside even after Trump left office. Vladeck pointed out that "if Trump resigned (or his term ended) mid-trial, it would be more than a little odd for the Chief Justice to give way to the Vice President." Georgia State University law professor Neil Kinkopf argued that "a trial of a President (even a former President) is a momentous event and having the Chief Justice preside seems more congruent with, or more fitting of, the occasion."

=== House managers ===
On January 12, the day before the House debated the article of impeachment, Pelosi named nine Democratic representatives to be managers in the Senate trial: Raskin (lead manager), Cicilline, Lieu, Diana DeGette, Joaquin Castro, Eric Swalwell, Joe Neguse, Madeleine Dean, and Stacey Plaskett. The managers were chosen for their expertise in constitutional law, civil rights, and criminal justice. Raskin is a former constitutional law professor at American University; Lieu is a former military prosecutor in the United States Air Force; Cicilline is a former public defender; Swalwell is a former prosecutor in California; DeGette is a former civil rights attorney; and Castro, Neguse, Dean, and Plaskett are all former lawyers in private practice.

Democrats relied on many of the same lawyers and aides who helped assemble the first impeachment trial case, including Susanne Sachsman Grooms from the House Oversight and Reform Committee, and Aaron Hiller, Arya Hariharan, Sarah Istel and Amy Rutkin from the Judiciary Committee. The House also temporarily called back Barry H. Berke, a seasoned New York defense lawyer, to serve as chief counsel, along with Joshua Matz, a constitutional expert.

House managers
Lead manager Jamie Raskin (Maryland)	Diana DeGette (Colorado)	David Cicilline (Rhode Island)	Joaquin Castro (Texas)	Eric Swalwell (California)
Ted Lieu (California)	Joe Neguse (Colorado)	Madeleine Dean (Pennsylvania)	Stacey Plaskett (U.S. Virgin Islands)	

=== Trump counsel ===
It was initially unclear who would be on Trump's legal team, as numerous prominent law firms had refused to represent him. The Lincoln Project had publicly pressed law firms not to do so. Law & Crime reported that "essentially all respectable law firms and attorneys" were distancing themselves from him.

Rudy Giuliani, as Trump's personal lawyer, was left out of early conversations about the upcoming defense, and Trump ordered his aides to stop paying Giuliani. On January 18, one day after meeting with Trump, Giuliani said he would not represent him, stating, "Because I gave an earlier speech [at the rally], I am a witness and therefore unable to participate in court or in the Senate chamber." Similarly, John Eastman, who joined Giuliani on stage at the January 6 rally, was initially considered for a role on Trump's defense team, but he withdrew because his role at the rally made him a witness. Dershowitz, Pat Cipollone, and Jay Sekulow, who helped lead Trump's defense effort during his first impeachment trial, also declined to represent him. Other lawyers who defended Trump during his first impeachment trial, including former Florida Attorney General Pam Bondi, Eric Herschmann, Patrick Philbin, and Marc Kasowitz, said they were not interested in joining the defense for the second trial. Some of them privately expressed their belief that Trump's actions were indefensible.

Trump and congressional Republicans considered designating two of Trump's most vociferous defenders in Congress – Jim Jordan and Elise Stefanik – to represent him, even though neither is an attorney. (Note: Jordan graduated from Ohio's Capital University Law School in 2001, but has never been admitted to the bar; Stefanik has no formal legal training.) Congressman Matt Gaetz suggested he would resign his position in Congress to represent Trump if asked to be part of the legal team. Both Jordan and Stefanik had voted to reject electoral votes for Biden, even after the president's supporters stormed the Capitol on January 6.

In late January, Trump formed a defense team of five attorneys to be led by Butch Bowers, a South Carolina-based lawyer who helped former South Carolina governor Mark Sanford fight off being removed from office and who also helped former South Carolina Governor Nikki Haley during an ethics investigation. Senator Lindsey Graham of South Carolina had arranged Trump's hiring of Bowers. Subsequently, four more lawyers were named to the defense team under Bowers: Deborah Barbier, a Columbia, South Carolina, criminal defense lawyer and former federal prosecutor who has represented high-profile, controversial clients; former acting U.S. Attorney General Johnny Gasser; criminal defense attorney Greg Harris; and Josh Howard of North Carolina. However, the defense attorneys all withdrew on January 30, one week before the trial. The departures occurred after Trump clashed with his attorneys on strategy and fees. Trump wanted to focus on his false claims that the election was "stolen" from him, in contrast to the lawyers, who insisted on focusing on the legality of convicting a former president. Trump was unhappy with the fees and expenses estimated by the lawyers. None of the lawyers had been paid any advance fees nor had they signed letters of intent.

On February 1, after the collapse of his earlier legal team, Trump announced that David Schoen and Bruce Castor would be his new defense lawyers. Pennsylvania attorneys Michael van der Veen and William J. Brennan joined Schoen and Castor as part of the presentation team.

Trump counsel
David Schoen	Bruce Castor	Michael van der Veen	William J. Brennan

== Senators' positions ==
Senators' positions on conviction during trial according to USA Today on February 9, 2021
Party	Support conviction	Oppose conviction	No official statement
Democratic	38	0	10
Republican	5	35	10
Independent	2	0	0
Total	45	35	20

=== On whether to hold a trial ===
Senator Richard Blumenthal (D-CT) said: "The evidence is Trump's own words, recorded on video. It's a question of whether Republicans want to step up and face history." Senator Kirsten Gillibrand (D-NY) said, "This is a very simple allegation. It is incitement to insurrection. We could conduct a trial in a concise amount of time because the evidence that's needed is pretty direct." In the run-up to the trial, a number of Republican senators opposed holding a trial. Republican Senator Rand Paul of Kentucky continued to make false claims of election fraud. Other Senate Republicans, such as Marco Rubio of Florida, contended that a Senate trial would be too divisive and that it would be "arrogant" for the Senate to exercise its power to bar Trump from holding office in the future.

=== On whether to vote to convict ===
Senate Democrats favored the conviction of Trump, stating that the evidence was clear and straightforward. Assuming all Democratic senators (and the two independent senators caucusing with the Democrats) had voted to convict Trump, 17 Republican senators would have needed to vote to secure the two-thirds majority for conviction. If Trump had been convicted, then the Senate could have disqualified him from holding any federal office by a simple majority vote. On February 9, 45 senators (38 Democrats, 5 Republicans, and 2 independents caucusing with the Democrats) supported conviction, 35 senators (all Republican) opposed conviction, and 20 senators (10 Democrats and 10 Republicans) had not released an official statement. This implied that to convict Trump with the required two-thirds majority, some of the Republican senators who said they opposed conviction would have needed to change their minds, either by voting to convict or by not appearing for the vote. Senator Lindsey Graham (R-SC) worked to persuade other Republicans to vote against conviction. In January, Republican Senator Mitch McConnell, the former Senate Majority Leader, reportedly told senators their decision on whether to convict the outgoing president would be a "vote of conscience" and told colleagues he was undecided whether he himself would vote to convict. He later stated on the Senate floor that President Trump "provoked" the mob that stormed the Capitol. However, McConnell announced on the morning of February 13 that he would vote to acquit Trump.

== Pre-trial ==
=== Opening ceremonies ===
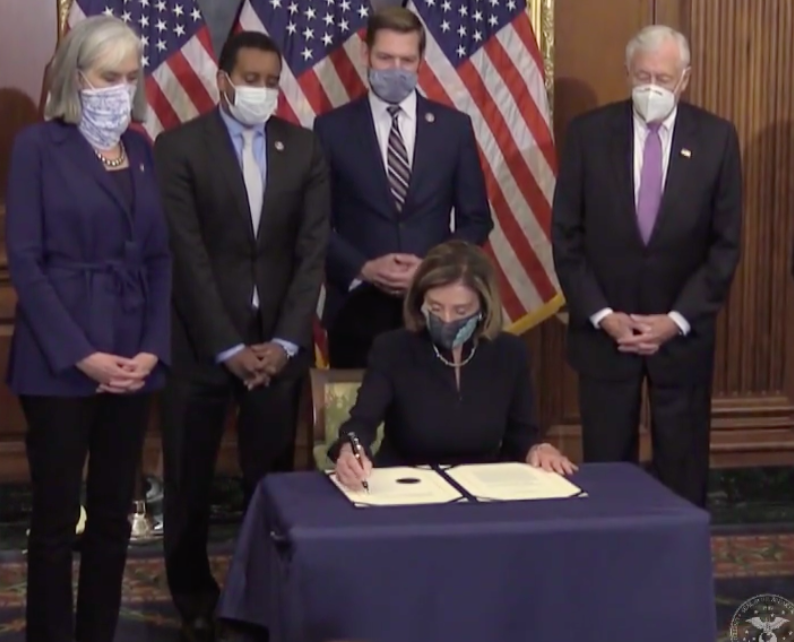
Nancy Pelosi signing the article of impeachment

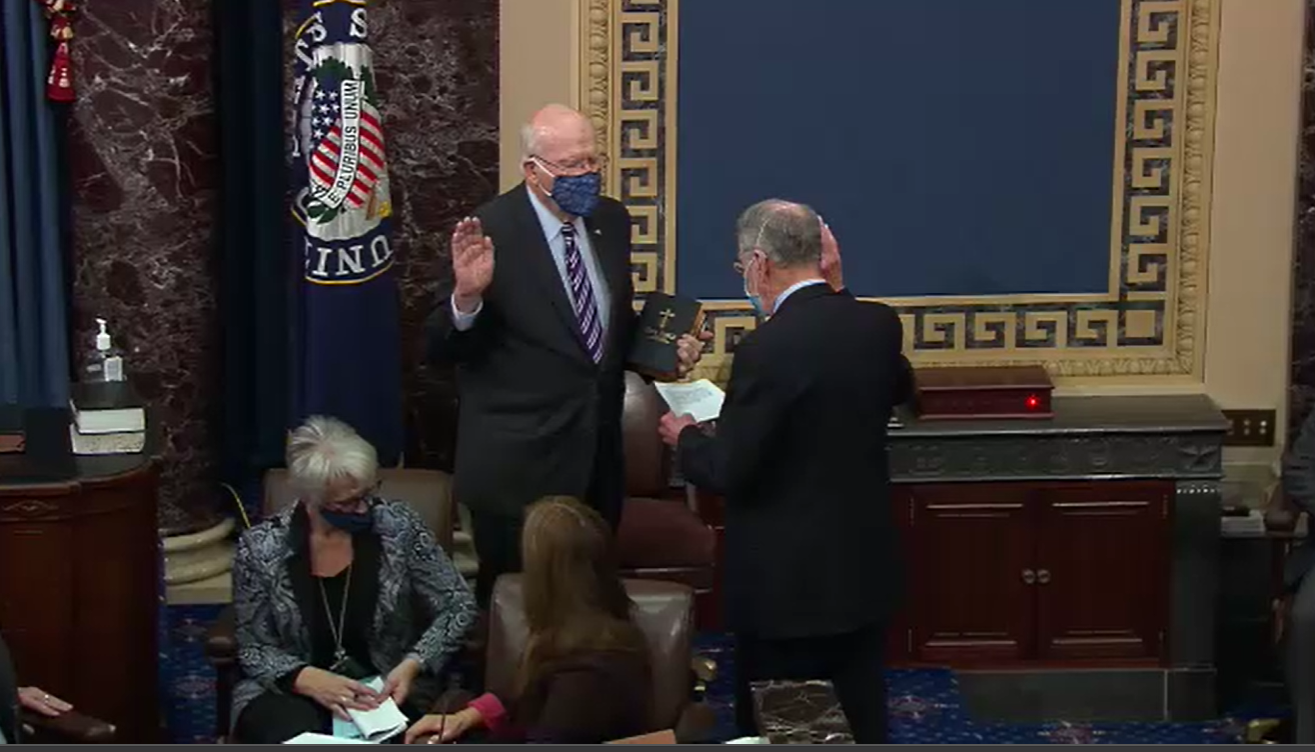
Senator Chuck Grassley administers the oath of office to President pro tempore Patrick Leahy.

Senators taking oath

Article I, Section 3, Clause 6 of the U.S. Constitution states that "The Senate shall have the sole Power to try all Impeachments." Per the Senate's impeachment rules adopted in 1986, the submission of the articles to the Senate initiated the trial. Speaker Pelosi signed the article of impeachment on January 13, 2021. The article was formally transmitted to the Senate on January 25, 2021. On January 26, the House impeachment managers, accompanied by the clerk of the House and the acting House sergeant at arms, conducted the ceremonial procession from the House to the Senate (across the National Statuary Hall and the Capitol rotunda) to formally deliver the article of impeachment, triggering the trial. Raskin, the lead House impeachment manager, read the article to the Senate.

Senate President pro tempore emeritus Chuck Grassley (R-IA) swore in the chamber's presiding officer, Senate President pro tempore Patrick Leahy (D-VT), who then swore in all senators as jurors. Each senator then signed the oath book. Each was required to take the following oath or make the affirmation:

Oath: I solemnly swear that in all things appertaining to the trial of the impeachment of Donald John Trump, then, now former, President of the United States, now pending, I will do impartial justice according to the Constitution and laws: So help me God.

Affirmation: I affirm that in all things appertaining to the trial of the impeachment of Donald John Trump, then, now former, President of the United States, now pending, I will do impartial justice according to the Constitution and laws.

The acting Senate sergeant-at-arms, Jennifer Hemmingway, then read aloud the following proclamation to mark the beginning of the proceedings:

Hear ye! Hear ye! Hear ye! All persons are commanded to keep silent, on pain of imprisonment, while the House of Representatives is exhibiting to the Senate of the United States articles of impeachment against Donald John Trump, the now former President of the United States.

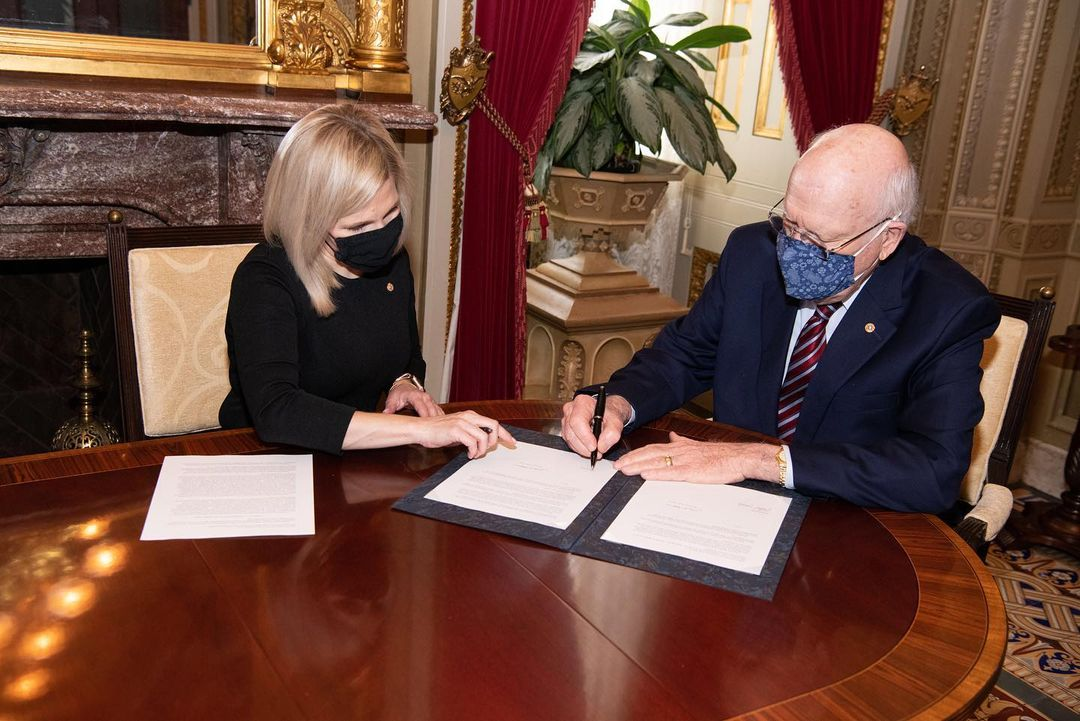
Senator Patrick Leahy signing the summons for second impeachment of Trump

The summons to Trump was issued the same day.

=== Rand Paul's point of order to dismiss ===
On January 26, Republican senator Rand Paul forced a vote to dismiss the impeachment charge, on the basis that it was unconstitutional to try a past president. The motion was defeated 55–45, with all Democrats, both the independents, and five Republicans (Susan Collins of Maine, Lisa Murkowski of Alaska, Mitt Romney of Utah, Ben Sasse of Nebraska, and Pat Toomey of Pennsylvania) voting against the motion. The vote was seen as a "test vote" and was viewed as a strong indication that the Senate would not reach the two-thirds majority required to convict Trump.

=== Trial memoranda and responses ===
Under an agreement between Chuck Schumer and Mitch McConnell, the pre-trial briefing schedule was set.

==== House's brief, Trump's answer, House's replication ====
Trial Memorandum of the House of Representatives

Replication of the House of Representatives to the Answer of President Trump

The House of Representatives, through the nine Democratic impeachment managers, filed an 80-page pretrial brief on February 2. The detailed brief stated that Trump was "singularly responsible" for the violent attack on the Capitol on January 6, citing his preceding campaign to undermine democracy and overthrow the election, and argued that acquitting Trump and failing to disqualify him from future office would gravely harm the nation, stating: "President Trump has demonstrated beyond doubt that he will resort to any method to maintain or reassert his grip on power. A president who violently attacks the democratic process has no right to participate in it."

The impeachment managers argued that the expiration of Trump's term, and his new status as a private citizen, did not present a bar to Senate trial and conviction, writing: "There is no 'January exception' to impeachment or any other provision of the Constitution. A president must answer comprehensively for his conduct in office from his first day in office through his last. and that it was "unthinkable" that the Framers of the Constitution would have left the country "virtually defenseless against a president's treachery in his final days, allowing him to misuse power, violate his Oath, and incite insurrection against Congress and our electoral institutions simply because he is a lame duck." The House brief stated that "if provoking an insurrectionary riot against a Joint Session of Congress after losing an election is not an impeachable offense, it is hard to imagine what would be."

Trump's lawyers filed a 14-page response to the article of impeachment later the same day. Trump's lawyers did not explicitly embrace Trump's false claims of a "rigged" election, but nevertheless echoed them, asserting that "insufficient evidence exists upon which a reasonable jurist could conclude that the 45th president's statements were accurate or not, and he, therefore, denies they were false." Trump's lawyers also argued that the impeachment proceeding is legally "void" because Trump is no longer president. The brief asserted that prior to the January 6 riots, Trump had "exercised his First Amendment right under the Constitution to express his belief that the election results were suspect".

The House had predicted that Trump would use the First Amendment for his defense, which they countered in their brief that the First Amendment was not applicable to an impeachment trial, writing: "The First Amendment protects private citizens from the government; it does not protect government officials from accountability for their own abuses in office." Quoting the standard established in Brandenburg v. Ohio (1969), a landmark decision of the U.S. Supreme Court interpreting the First Amendment, the House added that "speech is not protected where it is 'directed to inciting or producing imminent lawless action and is likely to incite or produce such action." Nearly 150 leading First Amendment lawyers and constitutional scholars from across the political spectrum found Trump's First Amendment assertion "legally frivolous" and not a viable defense against conviction.

The House submitted its replication to Trump's answer on February 8.

==== Trump's brief, House's reply ====
Reply Memorandum of the House to the Trial Memorandum of President Trump

Trump, through his attorneys Bruce L. Castor Jr., David Schoen, and Michael T. van der Veen, submitted a brief asserting that Democratic leadership in the House were engaging in a "selfish attempt" to capitalize on the storming of the Capitol and its aftermath. They argued that instead of healing the nation or prosecuting lawbreakers who participated in the riot, they instead intend "to callously harness the chaos of the moment for their own political gain." Unusual for legal documents, Trump's lawyers invoked partisan rhetoric, writing that Democrats suffer from "Trump Derangement Syndrome"; sought to "silence a political opponent and a minority party" as part of a years-long effort; and "hunger for this political theater" that would be "a danger to our Republic [sic] democracy and the rights that we hold dear."

Seeking to distance Trump from his supporters who assaulted the Capitol, his lawyers wrote that "the people who criminally breached the Capitol did so of their own accord and for their own reasons, and they are being criminally prosecuted." Trump's lawyers, citing discredited sources such as the conspiracy theorist The Gateway Pundit website, also falsely claimed in the brief some elements of the Capitol insurrection consisted of anti-Trump rather than pro-Trump figures. The brief also denies that Trump took no steps to halt the violence, described him as "horrified" by the scene and asserting that there was a "flurry of activity" inside the White House constrained by "complex procedural elements"; this revisionist account is contradicted by the actual sequence of events on January 6, when Trump initially ignored requests for him to restrain the mob, and was described by multiple Trump administration officials and others in contact with him on that day as delighted at the halting of the electoral vote count.

Trump's lawyers argued that Trump did not incite the rioters and that his comments and rhetoric about fighting was metaphorical rather than a call for violence. They contended that Trump, in the rally preceding the assault on the Capitol, used the term fight "in the figurative sense" and not "to encourage acts of violence." Trump's lawyers also described some of Trump's acts, including a phone call in which Trump pressured Georgia Secretary of State Brad Raffensperger to "find" additional votes for him to overturn Biden's victory in Georgia, as merely political. Trump's lawyers also repeated their free-speech argument, arguing that he could not be convicted due to the First Amendment; a minority of legal scholars believe that the First Amendment applies in the impeachment context.

The brief makes 15 references to a 2001 article on impeachment by prominent legal scholar Brian Kalt, asserting that he had concluded that impeaching a former president is unconstitutional. Kalt replied that Trump's lawyers made "flat-out misrepresentations" of his work and that he had actually concluded that there is a "solid basis" for post-presidential impeachments, having noted and rejected contrary arguments.

In an unprecedented maneuver in American history, the Trump defense team declared that Trump would, if convicted by the Senate, attempt to overturn the verdict. Trump's lawyers say the conviction would be "unauthorized" and "non-binding" – and that if Trump runs for president again, it "would be challenged in a court of law". Given Nixon v. United States, it is unclear whether or to what extent a challenge to a Senate impeachment conviction would be justiciable. The Supreme Court case had unanimously determined that the question of whether the Senate had properly tried an impeachment was a political question and could not be resolved in the judicial branch.

The House submitted its reply memorandum on February 9, 2021.

=== Trump declines invitation to testify ===
Request of Jamie Raskin on behalf of the House for Trump to testify

In a letter to Trump attorneys on February 4, lead impeachment manager Jamie Raskin invited Trump to testify (and be subject to cross-examination) before or during the impeachment trial; the House impeachment managers argued that his testimony was needed after he disputed the House's allegations that he incited the insurrection at the Capitol. The letter stated that Trump's refusal to testify would support "a strong adverse inference" against Trump. The House's letter noted that there was no barrier to a former president giving testimony (and noted that Presidents Gerald Ford and Bill Clinton had testified in office, and the Supreme Court held in Trump v. Vance (2020) that Trump was not immune from legal process while serving as president).

Trump's lawyers Castor and Schoen responded to Raskin the same day in a terse letter declining the invitation. In their response, they called the House's request for Trump's testimony "a public relations stunt"; rejected the implication of adverse inference for refusing to have Trump testify; said that the House "cannot prove" its allegations; called the impeachment trial an "unconstitutional proceeding"; and stated that it is too serious "to try and play these games".

The House impeachment managers signaled that they would not subpoena Trump's testimony, stating that there was ample other evidence (including video evidence) that supported his guilt. Raskin stated that Trump's "immediate refusal to testify speaks volumes and plainly establishes an adverse inference supporting his guilt."

== Argument preparation ==
=== Prosecution ===
In preparation for the trial, House Democrats built a detailed case against Trump, emphasizing what Trump knew in advance of the attack on the Capitol on January 6 and the effect of Trump's words and actions on his rioting supporters, with the goal of showing that Trump "summoned the mob, assembled the mob, and lit the flame of this attack". In a notable departure on strategy, the managers declined to discuss the logistics of their case, whereas in the previous impeachment trial they had engaged in numerous communication platforms to advance their position to the public. The managers also sought to apply the lessons learned in the last impeachment trial: not antagonize Republicans, use lots of videos, and make succinct arguments. The managers prepared to conclude in a week, forgoing witnesses as they believed it would be unnecessary and hinder Biden's priorities on passing legislation and confirming nominees. The managers intended to use the evidence collected in FBI affidavits charging hundreds of the Capitol insurrectionists, many of whom cited Trump's comments as permission to storm the Capitol. On certain filings, Trump is described as a "de facto unindicted coconspirator" for the Capitol riots and the driving force behind the breach, according to Proud Boys organizer Ethan Nordean. Accordingly, the House was reported to present their case like a "violent crime criminal prosecution." House impeachment managers and the staff, aided by the law firm Debevoise & Plimpton, compiled audio and video footage of Trump's rally and the ensuing attack on the Capitol, as well as details about the injuries sustained by police.

According to The New York Times, the managers were also concerned about implicating Republican lawmakers who entertained the president's false claims of election fraud, notably those who questioned and objected to the 2021 Electoral College vote count, as well as in the case of Ted Cruz and Josh Hawley, played a role in the Capitol storming. The managers sought to make clear that it is not his party but Trump himself who is on trial, so as to not alienate the GOP senators.

=== Defense ===
Trump's defense team indicated that they would present their opening arguments in one day. Bruce Castor, David Schoen, Michael van der Veen and William J. Brennan were all expected to speak. Trump announced that he would not testify for the impeachment trial.

On the evening before the defense's opening arguments, Senators Lindsey Graham, Ted Cruz, and Mike Lee were seen going into a room that Trump's lawyers were using to prepare for their arguments. Cruz downplayed the meeting as an opportunity to "share [their] thoughts" about the defense's legal strategy. When reporters confronted Schoen on the appropriateness of impartial jurors consulting with the defense team, he claimed that the trial did not have "any semblance of due process whatsoever".

== Procedural resolution ==
Senate Resolution 47 – Organizing Resolution

On February 8, Schumer and McConnell reached an agreement on the procedural resolution for the trial, giving the impeachment managers and Trump's lawyers up to 16 hours each to present their cases and creating the option for a debate and vote to call witnesses if the House impeachment managers sought it. Schumer announced that the trial rules had been agreed to by Senate Republican and Democrats, as well as the House managers and Trump's legal team. Trump's attorney David Schoen, who is of Jewish faith, originally requested a pause of the trial for the Sabbath, starting on the evening of Friday, February 12, and for the trial to resume on Sunday, February 14. Senate Majority Leader Chuck Schumer and other Senate leadership agreed to this request, but Schoen later withdrew this request, saying that other Trump defense lawyers could continue the trial during this period.

The Senate voted, 89–11, to adopt the procedural rules for the trial on February 9, and the trial started with a four-hour debate on the constitutionality of the trial, then the Senate voted at a simple majority threshold to affirm the proceedings' constitutionality, 56-44.

Opening Arguments

In a two-hour presentation on February 9, the House managers argued that the Senate has jurisdiction to try the impeachment of Trump. Castor opened the defense argument with what many criticized as a rambling 48-minute presentation. He argued that the impeachment was politically motivated, and unnecessary because voters had already been "smart enough" to vote Trump out of office and, in doing so, explicitly acknowledged Biden had won a free and fair election. Raskin played video footage of the Capitol storming and Trump's rhetoric to highlight the consequences if presidents could commit impeachable offenses in their last month without constitutional accountability.

The statement that Biden won the election was seen to have undercut both their arguments in pre-trial briefs of Trump's repeated false claims that the election was fraudulent, stolen, and rigged; and accordingly his speech on January 6 was justified because he believed the election was fundamentally "suspect." Trump had initially made clear to advisers that he did not want his lawyers saying that Biden won the election fairly, even if it was not their main focus at the trial. Accordingly, Trump was reported to be very displeased with Castor's performance. Castor's argument was widely criticized for numerous bizarre and incoherent statements, such as "Nebraska, you're going to hear, is quite a judicial-thinking place." Alan Dershowitz stated, "There is no argument. I have no idea what he's doing."

Following the four-hour debate where both sides presented arguments on whether the trial was unconstitutional because Trump was no longer president, the Senate voted 56–44 that the impeachment trial was constitutional. The original five Republican senators voting with Democrats in the Rand Paul point of order voted in favor, along with Bill Cassidy (R-LA) who in a post-interview used adjectives of focused, organized, and compelling to describe the case brought. A simple majority was required to proceed. The lack of Republican support to proceed with the trial was interpreted as indicating an increased likelihood of Trump's acquittal. Ted Cruz, who voted against the constitutionality of the trial, told Fox News the same day that he believed it was constitutional but not required.

Vote on the constitutionality of the trial
TYPE	Yes	No
Democratic	48	0
Republican	6	44
Independent	2	0
Totals	56	44
Constitutional

Roll call votes on the constitutionality of the trial
Name of Senator	Party name	Total votes
Tammy Baldwin	D–WI	Yea
John Barrasso	R–WY	Nay
Michael Bennet	D–CO	Yea
Marsha Blackburn	R–TN	Nay
Richard Blumenthal	D–CT	Yea
Roy Blunt	R–MO	Nay
Cory Booker	D–NJ	Yea
John Boozman	R–AR	Nay
Mike Braun	R-IN	Nay
Sherrod Brown	D-OH	Yea
Richard Burr	R–NC	Nay
Maria Cantwell	D–WA	Yea
Shelley Moore Capito	R–WV	Nay
Ben Cardin	D–MD	Yea
Tom Carper	D–DE	Yea
Bob Casey Jr.	D–PA	Yea
Bill Cassidy	R–LA	Yea
Susan Collins	R–ME	Yea
Chris Coons	D–DE	Yea
John Cornyn	R–TX	Nay
Catherine Cortez Masto	D–NV	Yea
Tom Cotton	R–AR	Nay
Kevin Cramer	R–ND	Nay
Mike Crapo	R–ID	Nay
Ted Cruz	R–TX	Nay
Steve Daines	R–MT	Nay
Tammy Duckworth	D–IL	Yea
Dick Durbin	D–IL	Yea
Joni Ernst	R–IA	Nay
Dianne Feinstein	D–CA	Yea
Deb Fischer	R–NE	Nay
Kirsten Gillibrand	D–NY	Yea
Lindsey Graham	R–SC	Nay
Chuck Grassley	R–IA	Nay
Bill Hagerty	R–TN	Nay
Maggie Hassan	D–NH	Yea
Josh Hawley	R–MO	Nay
Martin Heinrich	D–NM	Yea
John Hickenlooper	D–CO	Yea
Mazie Hirono	D–HI	Yea
John Hoeven	R–ND	Nay
Cindy Hyde-Smith	R–MS	Nay
Jim Inhofe	R–OK	Nay
Ron Johnson	R–WI	Nay
Tim Kaine	D–VA	Yea
Mark Kelly	D–AZ	Yea
John Kennedy	R–LA	Nay
Angus King	I–ME	Yea
Amy Klobuchar	D–MN	Yea
James Lankford	R–OK	Nay
Patrick Leahy	D–VT	Yea
Mike Lee	R–UT	Nay
Ben Ray Luján	D–NM	Yea
Cynthia Lummis	R–WY	Nay
Joe Manchin	D–WV	Yea
Ed Markey	D–MA	Yea
Roger Marshall	R–KS	Nay
Mitch McConnell	R–KY	Nay
Bob Menendez	D–NJ	Yea
Jeff Merkley	D–OR	Yea
Jerry Moran	R–KS	Nay
Lisa Murkowski	R–AK	Yea
Chris Murphy	D–CT	Yea
Patty Murray	D–WA	Yea
Jon Ossoff	D–GA	Yea
Alex Padilla	D–CA	Yea
Rand Paul	R–KY	Nay
Gary Peters	D–MI	Yea
Rob Portman	R–OH	Nay
Jack Reed	D–RI	Yea
Jim Risch	R–ID	Nay
Mitt Romney	R–UT	Yea
Jacky Rosen	D–NV	Yea
Mike Rounds	R–SD	Nay
Marco Rubio	R–FL	Nay
Bernie Sanders	I–VT	Yea
Ben Sasse	R–NE	Yea
Brian Schatz	D–HI	Yea
Chuck Schumer	D–NY	Yea
Rick Scott	R–FL	Nay
Tim Scott	R–SC	Nay
Jeanne Shaheen	D–NH	Yea
Richard Shelby	R–AL	Nay
Kyrsten Sinema	D–AZ	Yea
Tina Smith	D–MN	Yea
Debbie Stabenow	D–MI	Yea
Dan Sullivan	R–AK	Nay
Jon Tester	D–MT	Yea
John Thune	R–SD	Nay
Thom Tillis	R–NC	Nay
Pat Toomey	R–PA	Yea
Tommy Tuberville	R–AL	Nay
Chris Van Hollen	D–MD	Yea
Mark Warner	D–VA	Yea
Raphael Warnock	D–GA	Yea
Elizabeth Warren	D–MA	Yea
Sheldon Whitehouse	D–RI	Yea
Roger Wicker	R–MS	Nay
Ron Wyden	D–OR	Yea
Todd Young	R–IN	Nay
Total	Yay	56
	Nay	44

On February 12, a group of 199 legal experts, including prominent conservative lawyers Charles Fried, Stuart M. Gerson, Paul Rosenzweig, and Peter Keisler issued a letter, saying that because Trump's jurisdictional challenge had failed, the Senate had an obligation to vote on the merits: "The former President chose to raise a jurisdictional argument in a motion to dismiss the trial. This body, exercising its considered judgment, determined that the Senate does have jurisdiction to try this case and so resolved the issue. ... Now that the Senate, as a collegial body, has ruled on the jurisdictional question, individual Senators should respect and honor that determination of the Senate as a body, even if they might have disagreed with it as an initial matter." The letter-writers echoed an argument the lead House impeachment manager Jamie Raskin had made the preceding day: (that the February 9 Senate vote definitively established constitutional jurisdiction and obliged each Senator to vote "on the facts of what happened") and contradicted the stance of Senate Republicans who said they would vote against convicting Trump on the procedural ground that he was no longer president.

== Opening arguments and presentations ==
=== Prosecution ===
Security footage, introduced as evidence by House impeachment managers, showing Vice President Mike Pence being evacuated from the Capitol after rioters breached the complex

On February 9, Raskin described the scene in the House during the invasion, with people phoning their loved ones to say goodbye, and "the most haunting sound I ever heard" – people pounding on the door like a battering ram. Regarding the constitutionality of trying Trump when he was no longer in office, he urged senators not to create a "January exception" to a president's accountability.

On February 10, the impeachment managers began to present their case. They presented new footage of the attack, including police body camera footage. Citing this, Plaskett revealed that rioters came within 100 feet of where Vice President Pence was sheltering with his family, and raised the point that a gallows was constructed outside the Capitol where rioters chanted "Hang Mike Pence". Citing the possession of a 950,000-volt stun gun by the man who was photographed with his feet on Pelosi's desk, as well as other evidence, Plaskett argued that the rioters intended to murder the speaker of the House. Plaskett stated that lawmakers were put in danger because of Trump's speeches and tweets. She cited witness testimony from arrested rioters who said that anyone they got their hands on they would have killed. "They were talking about assassinating the vice president of the United States", she said. "They did it because Donald Trump sent them."

The impeachment managers' presentation concluded on February 11. Diana DeGette argued that statements of rioters made "before, during and after the attack make clear the attack was done for Donald Trump, at his instructions, and to fulfill his wishes." Ted Lieu argued that Trump demonstrated no remorse after the attack.

==== Mike Lee's motion to strike ====
Immediately after the end of the first day of opening arguments, Senator Mike Lee raised an objection. He moved to strike a portion of the prosecution's presentation in which they described Trump's telephone calls to him and Senator Tommy Tuberville, claiming that their description of the calls was untrue. This drew much confusion due to Lee's spokesperson and Tuberville confirming the calls from Trump. Despite the perplexity of the situation, Rep. Jamie Raskin, the lead impeachment manager, eventually agreed to Lee's request calling it "much to do about nothing".

=== Defense ===
On February 12, Trump's counsel Castor, Schoen, van der Veen and Brennan presented their opening arguments. Van der Veen called the impeachment article an "unconstitutional act of political vengeance" and amounted to "constitutional cancel culture" on Trump and his supporters. They claimed that Trump's remarks that day "encouraged those in attendance to exercise their rights peacefully and patriotically", and that the House's charge that he incited an insurrection was "a preposterous and monstrous lie".

Van der Veen argued that if the Capitol attack was premeditated as criminal files have alleged, Trump could not have incited what was already planned. Schoen asserted that the House had afforded Trump's counsel no due process in the impeachment proceedings and claimed that the House has manipulated footage and relayed inaccurate information. They also criticized the managers for heavily saying "reportedly" as their standard for evidence.

Mounting a "whataboutism" defense, Trump's lawyers played a lengthy video montage demonstrating what they described as the hypocrisy of Democrats' reactions to Trump's rhetoric. As examples, they showed clips of Schumer appearing to threaten Supreme Court Justices Kavanaugh and Gorsuch at a March 2020 pro-abortion rights rally. (Schumer apologized the next day.) The video montage included Democrats using the word "fight" and the phrase "fight like hell" in several speeches, remarks, and interviews, focusing on Senator Elizabeth Warren. Many of the clips, from Democratic figures such as Representatives Maxine Waters, Al Green, Nancy Pelosi, and Alexandria Ocasio-Cortez, Senators Elizabeth Warren and Jon Tester, and President Biden, were taken out of context, and involved the Democrats referring to "fighting" for constituents against bureaucratic obstacles (as in the Tester clip), fighting for progressive policy positions (as in the Warren clips), or fighting the coronavirus (as in a Schumer clip). Trump's lawyers falsely claimed that Trump's first two tweets during the Capitol attack urged calm; Trump in fact first tweeted an attack on Vice President Pence before making a tweet saying "stay peaceful" and "no violence". Trump's attorneys asserted that Democrats' calls for Trump's impeachment was evidence of a "double standard", and claimed that Democrats and liberals had been out to get Trump physically and politically since the beginning of his candidacy for president. They furthermore showed clips of Trump's speeches throughout the years that they claimed the Democrats and media had misrepresented, as evidence that he had always condemned violence and white supremacy. They insisted that Trump's words at the rally were "ordinary political rhetoric" and protected free speech. The defense team rested their case after less than three hours, proceeding to a question-and-answer session.

During the proceedings, Republican Senators Ted Cruz, Mike Lee, Dan Sullivan, Mike Braun, Todd Young, and Marsha Blackburn repeatedly huddled to discuss their "standards" of impeachment. Graham and Cruz repeatedly consulted with Trump's lawyers during their breaks.

=== Reactions and developments ===
Republicans generally lauded the House managers' presentation, with focus being drawn to Ted Lieu's warning that he was not concerned about the results of Trump winning another presidential election, but of his losing one. Most Republicans said they thought Trump would be acquitted, with some repeating their convictions about the trial's alleged unconstitutionality. Trump's lawyers' presentation was praised by Republicans such as Ron Johnson and John Barrasso.

Democrats criticized Trump's lawyers' presentation and denounced the defense team's equating of Trump's rhetoric ahead of the storming of the Capitol to past comments by Democrats: Senator Tim Kaine called it a "bogus argument"; Martin Heinrich called it a "completely false equivalence" and said "I don't remember any violent mobs after any of those comments"; and Chris Coons said, "Show me any time that the result was, our supporters pulled someone out of the crowd, beat the living crap out of them, and then we said, 'That's great, good for you, you're a patriot.'"

Schoen reportedly threatened on the evening of February 11, the night before the opening argument for the defense, to quit Trump's defense team over a disagreement about the use of videos. Trump called Schoen and convinced him to stay.

== Question-and-answer session ==
On the fourth day of the hearing, senators had four hours to submit questions to the House managers and the counsel for Donald Trump.

The first question from Schumer and Feinstein (Q1) was whether the attack on the Capitol would have happened if not for Trump's conduct; impeachment manager Castro responded by quoting Cheney's statement on Trump's actions. Graham, Cruz, Kevin Cramer, and Roger Marshall submitted a question (Q2) on whether politicians' raising bail for rioters encouraged more rioters; Castro said it did. Raphael Warnock asked (Q3) if it was true that dozens of courts had previously rejected Trump's efforts to overturn the election. Lisa Murkowski asked (Q4) when Trump learned of the Capitol attack and what specific actions he took to end the rioting. Van der Veen accused the House impeachment team of not carrying out a proper investigation to determine those facts, claiming the House relied on "hearsay". Jacky Rosen asked (Q5) if there was evidence that Trump should have known that his tolerance of anti-Semitic hate speech and rhetoric could have incited the violence. Plaskett answered that Trump had a recorded history of encouraging violence.

Van der Veen discussed Brandenburg v. Ohio, which he called a "landmark case on the issue of incitement speech", to argue that Trump had not meant for his supporters to storm the Capitol, calling Trump's speech metaphorical. Ed Markey and Tammy Duckworth asked (Q7) when Trump learned of the breach and what actions he took to stop the violence. Plaskett stated, "The answer is, nothing." Mitt Romney and Susan Collins asked both sides (Q8) whether Trump knew that Pence had been escorted from the Senate when Trump tweeted to disparage him. Castro said he had known, referring to Tuberville's call. Van der Veen, however, said that this was hearsay and that there was no solid evidence due to "lack of due diligence". Marsha Blackburn and Mike Crapo asked (Q10) whether a former official could be impeached, and Van der Veen argued that it was not constitutional, despite the Senate having already voted that it was. Amy Klobuchar, Bob Casey, and Sherrod Brown asked (Q9) what message the Senate would send if it did not convict Trump. Plaskett warned that there would be consequences and quoted Trump's words, "This is only the beginning". Alex Padilla asked (Q11) if Trump's allegations of fraud had led to the "radicalization" of his supporters to attack the Capitol. Castro responded that Trump's "big lie" had incited them. Josh Hawley and Kevin Cramer asked (Q12) if the Senate could disqualify sitting presidents without removing them. Castro answered in the negative, which Raskin disputed. Elizabeth Warren asked (Q13) the managers whether Democrats objecting to previous Electoral College votes had intended for rioters to storm the Capitol. Raskin called that a false comparison and noted that Democrats did not cause any violence. Jeff Merkley asked (Q17) the managers whether the president was innocent because he told the rioters later to be "peaceful". Raskin compared that to robbing a bank and then yelling "respect private property".

Bernie Sanders asked both sides (Q15) whether, in their judgment, Trump lost the 2020 election. Plaskett said that Trump lost the popular and Electoral College vote, and that the DOJ and courts had agreed that all legal votes were counted. Van der Veen, however, refused to answer the question on the basis that his judgment was "irrelevant" to the proceeding, causing a ruckus on the Senate floor before Leahy restored order.

Ron Johnson asked (Q16) why law enforcement would have been surprised and overwhelmed if the storming was premeditated. Van der Veen praised but did not answer the question. Plaskett stated that Trump knew the rioters would come and cultivated them, yet did not deploy the National Guard.

Cruz asked a question (Q18) equating Kamala Harris's statement that she would raise bail money for Black Lives Matter protesters with the behavior described in the House's article of impeachment. Raskin replied that he would let Harris speak for herself and said outgoing presidents should be held to account for their conduct. Raskin noted that the original permit for the rally had said attendees would not march, but that the plan was changed after Trump intervened. Van der Veen criticized Raskin for being unfamiliar with Harris's "protected speech" and asked that the Senate protect Trump's.

Patty Murray asked (Q19) whether Trump's 6:01 pm tweet was relevant to his guilt. Castro responded by asking why, if Trump was not guilty and the storming was not his intention, he would have sent the tweet. Joe Manchin asked (Q21) whether Trump would have been responsible for not protecting Congress given that he had FBI and domestic intelligence at his disposal. Plaskett stated that Trump was fully aware and thus fully responsible. Bill Cassidy asked (Q20) if Trump knew about the rioters and Pence's presence in the Capitol. Van der Veen said those facts were based on hearsay. Raskin countered that Trump's defense team had refused to have Trump provide direct testimony to establish a record. Dan Sullivan asked (Q22) about the House's assertion that due process was "discretionary" and about the constitutional ramifications of establishing that precedent. Van der Veen said that was why senators needed to acquit. Richard Blumenthal asked (Q23) whether the relevant Supreme Court case prohibited officials from being held accountable through impeachment for inciting violence. Raskin noted that Trump's lawyers were trying to treat the trial as a criminal trial and Trump as a criminal defendant. Marco Rubio asked both sides (Q26) whether, in the future, Congress could impeach a former secretary of state, alluding to Hillary Clinton. Raskin called the hypothetical "irrelevant", and Van der Veen stated that conviction would lead to a "slippery slope".

The Senate adjourned after giving a standing ovation to Capitol Police Officer Eugene Goodman for his actions during the riot and passing a bill to award him the Congressional Gold Medal.

== Vote on subpoenas ==
On February 13, 2021, the Senate voted 55–45 to allow both sides to subpoena witnesses for testimony and documents for the trial. The vote came as a surprise to both sides, as the expectation had been that a vote would be taken and the trial would end on that day. The trial was recessed so that the parties could discuss what steps to take. An additional vote would be required to establish the rules for calling witnesses.

Vote on subpoenas
TYPE	Yes	No
Democratic	48	0
Republican	5	45
Independent	2	0
Totals	55	45
Allow subpoenas

Roll call votes for the vote on subpoenas
Senator	Party Name	Total votes
Tammy Baldwin	D–WI	Yea
John Barrasso	R–WY	Nay
Michael Bennet	D–CO	Yea
Marsha Blackburn	R–TN	Nay
Richard Blumenthal	D–CT	Yea
Roy Blunt	R–MO	Nay
Cory Booker	D–NJ	Yea
John Boozman	R–AR	Nay
Mike Braun	R-IN	Nay
Sherrod Brown	D-OH	Yea
Richard Burr	R–NC	Nay
Maria Cantwell	D–WA	Yea
Shelley Moore Capito	R–WV	Nay
Ben Cardin	D–MD	Yea
Tom Carper	D–DE	Yea
Bob Casey Jr.	D–PA	Yea
Bill Cassidy	R–LA	Nay
Susan Collins	R–ME	Yea
Chris Coons	D–DE	Yea
John Cornyn	R–TX	Nay
Catherine Cortez Masto	D–NV	Yea
Tom Cotton	R–AR	Nay
Kevin Cramer	R–ND	Nay
Mike Crapo	R–ID	Nay
Ted Cruz	R–TX	Nay
Steve Daines	R–MT	Nay
Tammy Duckworth	D–IL	Yea
Dick Durbin	D–IL	Yea
Joni Ernst	R–IA	Nay
Dianne Feinstein	D–CA	Yea
Deb Fischer	R–NE	Nay
Kirsten Gillibrand	D–NY	Yea
Lindsey Graham	R–SC	Yea
Chuck Grassley	R–IA	Nay
Bill Hagerty	R–TN	Nay
Maggie Hassan	D–NH	Yea
Josh Hawley	R–MO	Nay
Martin Heinrich	D–NM	Yea
John Hickenlooper	D–CO	Yea
Mazie Hirono	D–HI	Yea
John Hoeven	R–ND	Nay
Cindy Hyde-Smith	R–MS	Nay
Jim Inhofe	R–OK	Nay
Ron Johnson	R–WI	Nay
Tim Kaine	D–VA	Yea
Mark Kelly	D–AZ	Yea
John Kennedy	R–LA	Nay
Angus King	I–ME	Yea
Amy Klobuchar	D–MN	Yea
James Lankford	R–OK	Nay
Patrick Leahy	D–VT	Yea
Mike Lee	R–UT	Nay
Ben Ray Luján	D–NM	Yea
Cynthia Lummis	R–WY	Nay
Joe Manchin	D–WV	Yea
Ed Markey	D–MA	Yea
Roger Marshall	R–KS	Nay
Mitch McConnell	R–KY	Nay
Bob Menendez	D–NJ	Yea
Jeff Merkley	D–OR	Yea
Jerry Moran	R–KS	Nay
Lisa Murkowski	R–AK	Yea
Chris Murphy	D–CT	Yea
Patty Murray	D–WA	Yea
Jon Ossoff	D–GA	Yea
Alex Padilla	D–CA	Yea
Rand Paul	R–KY	Nay
Gary Peters	D–MI	Yea
Rob Portman	R–OH	Nay
Jack Reed	D–RI	Yea
Jim Risch	R–ID	Nay
Mitt Romney	R–UT	Yea
Jacky Rosen	D–NV	Yea
Mike Rounds	R–SD	Nay
Marco Rubio	R–FL	Nay
Bernie Sanders	I–VT	Yea
Ben Sasse	R–NE	Yea
Brian Schatz	D–HI	Yea
Chuck Schumer	D–NY	Yea
Rick Scott	R–FL	Nay
Tim Scott	R–SC	Nay
Jeanne Shaheen	D–NH	Yea
Richard Shelby	R–AL	Nay
Kyrsten Sinema	D–AZ	Yea
Tina Smith	D–MN	Yea
Debbie Stabenow	D–MI	Yea
Dan Sullivan	R–AK	Nay
Jon Tester	D–MT	Yea
John Thune	R–SD	Nay
Thom Tillis	R–NC	Nay
Pat Toomey	R–PA	Nay
Tommy Tuberville	R–AL	Nay
Chris Van Hollen	D–MD	Yea
Mark Warner	D–VA	Yea
Raphael Warnock	D–GA	Yea
Elizabeth Warren	D–MA	Yea
Sheldon Whitehouse	D–RI	Yea
Roger Wicker	R–MS	Nay
Ron Wyden	D–OR	Yea
Todd Young	R–IN	Nay
Total	Yay	55
	Nay	45

Senators resolved, after a two-hour discussion, and with the approval of both parties and the Republican leader, to allow the House Managers to read a statement from GOP Rep. Jaime Herrera Beutler and its entry into the record as evidence but not open to further argument.

Herrera Beutler had earlier told many people her recollection of Trump's call to McCarthy, who had described it to her. Her statement said:

In my January 12 statement in support of the article of impeachment, I referenced a conversation House Minority Leader Kevin McCarthy relayed to me that he'd had with President Trump while the January 6 attack was ongoing. Here are the details: When McCarthy finally reached the president on January 6 and asked him to publicly and forcefully call off the riot, the president initially repeated the falsehood that it was Antifa that had breached the Capitol. McCarthy refuted that and told the president that these were Trump supporters. That's when, according to McCarthy, the president said: 'Well, Kevin, I guess these people are more upset about the election than you are.' Since I publicly announced my decision to vote for impeachment, I have shared these details in countless conversations with constituents and colleagues, and multiple times through the media and other public forums. I told it to the Daily News of Longview on January 17. I've shared it with local county Republican executive board members, as well as other constituents who ask me to explain my vote. I shared it with thousands of residents on my telephone town hall on February 8. To the patriots who were standing next to the former president as these conversations were happening, or even to the former vice president: if you have something to add here, now would be the time.

Sen. Mike Lee handed over various phone records to the House impeachment managers to resolve a dispute over his call from Trump during the timeline of events. The records show that at 2:26 pm ET on Jan 6, Trump called Lee by mistake when he was looking to speak to Tuberville. Tuberville spoke with Trump on Lee's phone for less than 10 minutes, with Trump trying to convince him to make additional objections to the Electoral College vote in another effort to block Congress' certification of then President-elect Joe Biden's win. Tuberville has said he told Trump that Pence was being evacuated. Other records show that Trump had tweeted an attack on Pence for lacking "courage" two minutes earlier, at 2:25 pm ET.

Former Vice President Mike Pence's Chief of Staff Marc Short had also been contacted about providing information about threats to Pence. A source close to Pence had told reporters that Trump's legal team was lying when van der Veen claimed that "at no point" did the then-president know that Pence was in danger on January 6.

== Closing arguments ==
The impeachment managers made their closing arguments on February 13. Raskin argued that Trump's "dereliction of duty ... was central to his incitement of insurrection, and inextricable from it," and that Trump's call with McCarthy confirmed he did not care for the safety of lawmakers. Dean played a video montage of Trump's repeating the 'big lie'. Mike Lee briefly interrupted their arguments to object to using the video, as new evidence is not allowed to be admitted during closing arguments, but Dean argued that statement was already on record, and so Dean was allowed to continue and use it. Neguse concluded with an emotional appeal to senators and alluded to Martin Luther King Jr, warning of a "dark future" if senators did not convict Trump. Neguse rebutted the defense's arguments of lack of due process by arguing that the defense fully presented their evidence and declined invitations to testify and provide exculpatory evidence, and the defense's video montage of Democrats using words like "fight" by stating they did not end in attempting to overturn an election in the Capitol.

Trump's attorney Michael van der Veen made a closing argument containing many false and misleading claims. He falsely claimed that the Capitol insurrection was "preplanned and premeditated by fringe left and right groups"; the attack was perpetrated by right-wing rioters, some of whom pre-planned the attack and others who participated spontaneously. Van der Veen asserted that nothing Trump said "could ever possibly be construed as...encouraging or sanctioning an insurrection," although many of those who attacked the Capitol specifically said that Trump's words inspired them to take action. Echoing a claim that Trump had previously made, Van der Veen falsely accused President Biden and Vice President Harris of having "repeatedly refused to condemn" acts of violence during riots in 2020 over police violence; in fact, Biden and Harris publicly condemned riots, violence, and lawlessness in statements in August and October 2020. Van der Veen lambasted the Democrats for pursuing impeachment, calling it a "complete charade from beginning to end" and the "unhinged pursuit of a long-standing political vendetta" against Trump, and claiming that the Democrats' fear of Trump getting re-elected is fueling the trial. He ended their marks, calling it a "maniacal crusade," urging senators to not "go down this dark path of anonymity and division." He falsely asserted, "One of the first people arrested was the leader of antifa," though federal authorities had not linked the man in question, John Earle Sullivan, to Antifa, and the FBI said there was no evidence of Antifa involvement in the incident.

== Verdict ==
Trump was acquitted by the Senate on February 13, 2021, with 57 senators voting in favor of conviction and 43 voting against. Seven Republican senators joined the entire Democratic caucus in voting for conviction: Richard Burr of North Carolina, Bill Cassidy of Louisiana, Susan Collins of Maine, Lisa Murkowski of Alaska, Mitt Romney of Utah, Ben Sasse of Nebraska, and Pat Toomey of Pennsylvania. Despite the verdict being for acquittal, the result was the most bipartisan presidential impeachment conviction vote to date. In Trump's first impeachment trial, Romney became the first senator to vote to convict a president from his own party.

The voting was marked by tension in the Senate chamber. A greater number of Republicans voted to convict than Trump's legal team had expected. Burr's and Cassidy's votes to convict were considered surprising, and both were censured by their state parties (North Carolina and Louisiana, respectively). Murkowski was later censured by her state party of Alaska on March 16, 2021, which passed at 53–17. Another motion in Utah to censure Mitt Romney by the Utah Republican Party during the state convention on April 30, 2021, was defeated 798–711. Romney was booed during a speech in the convention where he defended his decision.

Among the seven senators who voted to convict, three (Cassidy, Collins, and Sasse) had just won reelection and two (Burr and Toomey) were not seeking another term, while Romney had already voted to convict Trump in the latter's first impeachment. Murkowski was the only one of those seven senators who was to face voters in the next election. However, most election pundits believed it unlikely that Murkowski would be defeated in a primary, despite threats by Trump and former Alaska governor Sarah Palin, due to Alaska's newly adopted ranked-choice voting system, and indeed Murkowski was re-elected.

Cassidy would lose re-nomination to Representative Julia Letlow, who went on to be elected in 2026. Sasse would resign his post in 2023 to become president of the University of Florida, resigning a year later due to a terminal cancer diagnosis. Collins would lose her re-election bid six years later.

Voting results
Article I (Incitement of insurrection)
	Guilty	Not guilty
Democratic	48	0
Republican	7	43
Independent	2	0
Totals	57	43
Not guilty (Note: Guilt based on "the Concurrence of two thirds of the Members present" according to the Constitution (Article 1, Section 3, Clause 6). There are 100 Senate seats (two per U.S. state) and all Senators were present at the trial. Two-thirds of 100 is 66.6̅, so 67 guilty votes were needed for a guilty verdict.)

Roll call vote on the Article of Impeachment
Senator	Party	Total votes
Tammy Baldwin	D–WI	Guilty
John Barrasso	R–WY	Not guilty
Michael Bennet	D–CO	Guilty
Marsha Blackburn	R–TN	Not guilty
Richard Blumenthal	D–CT	Guilty
Roy Blunt	R–MO	Not guilty
Cory Booker	D–NJ	Guilty
John Boozman	R–AR	Not guilty
Mike Braun	R–IN	Not guilty
Sherrod Brown	D–OH	Guilty
Richard Burr	R–NC	Guilty
Maria Cantwell	D–WA	Guilty
Shelley Moore Capito	R–WV	Not guilty
Ben Cardin	D–MD	Guilty
Tom Carper	D–DE	Guilty
Bob Casey Jr.	D–PA	Guilty
Bill Cassidy	R–LA	Guilty
Susan Collins	R–ME	Guilty
Chris Coons	D–DE	Guilty
John Cornyn	R–TX	Not guilty
Catherine Cortez Masto	D–NV	Guilty
Tom Cotton	R–AR	Not guilty
Kevin Cramer	R–ND	Not guilty
Mike Crapo	R–ID	Not guilty
Ted Cruz	R–TX	Not guilty
Steve Daines	R–MT	Not guilty
Tammy Duckworth	D–IL	Guilty
Dick Durbin	D–IL	Guilty
Joni Ernst	R–IA	Not guilty
Dianne Feinstein	D–CA	Guilty
Deb Fischer	R–NE	Not guilty
Kirsten Gillibrand	D–NY	Guilty
Lindsey Graham	R–SC	Not guilty
Chuck Grassley	R–IA	Not guilty
Bill Hagerty	R–TN	Not guilty
Maggie Hassan	D–NH	Guilty
Josh Hawley	R–MO	Not guilty
Martin Heinrich	D–NM	Guilty
John Hickenlooper	D–CO	Guilty
Mazie Hirono	D–HI	Guilty
John Hoeven	R–ND	Not guilty
Cindy Hyde-Smith	R–MS	Not guilty
Jim Inhofe	R–OK	Not guilty
Ron Johnson	R–WI	Not guilty
Tim Kaine	D–VA	Guilty
Mark Kelly	D–AZ	Guilty
John Kennedy	R–LA	Not guilty
Angus King	I–ME	Guilty
Amy Klobuchar	D–MN	Guilty
James Lankford	R–OK	Not guilty
Patrick Leahy	D–VT	Guilty
Mike Lee	R–UT	Not guilty
Ben Ray Luján	D–NM	Guilty
Cynthia Lummis	R–WY	Not guilty
Joe Manchin	D–WV	Guilty
Ed Markey	D–MA	Guilty
Roger Marshall	R–KS	Not guilty
Mitch McConnell	R–KY	Not guilty
Bob Menendez	D–NJ	Guilty
Jeff Merkley	D–OR	Guilty
Jerry Moran	R–KS	Not guilty
Lisa Murkowski	R–AK	Guilty
Chris Murphy	D–CT	Guilty
Patty Murray	D–WA	Guilty
Jon Ossoff	D–GA	Guilty
Alex Padilla	D–CA	Guilty
Rand Paul	R–KY	Not guilty
Gary Peters	D–MI	Guilty
Rob Portman	R–OH	Not guilty
Jack Reed	D–RI	Guilty
Jim Risch	R–ID	Not guilty
Mitt Romney	R–UT	Guilty
Jacky Rosen	D–NV	Guilty
Mike Rounds	R–SD	Not guilty
Marco Rubio	R–FL	Not guilty
Bernie Sanders	I–VT	Guilty
Ben Sasse	R–NE	Guilty
Brian Schatz	D–HI	Guilty
Chuck Schumer	D–NY	Guilty
Rick Scott	R–FL	Not guilty
Tim Scott	R–SC	Not guilty
Jeanne Shaheen	D–NH	Guilty
Richard Shelby	R–AL	Not guilty
Kyrsten Sinema	D–AZ	Guilty
Tina Smith	D–MN	Guilty
Debbie Stabenow	D–MI	Guilty
Dan Sullivan	R–AK	Not guilty
Jon Tester	D–MT	Guilty
John Thune	R–SD	Not guilty
Thom Tillis	R–NC	Not guilty
Pat Toomey	R–PA	Guilty
Tommy Tuberville	R–AL	Not guilty
Chris Van Hollen	D–MD	Guilty
Mark Warner	D–VA	Guilty
Raphael Warnock	D–GA	Guilty
Elizabeth Warren	D–MA	Guilty
Sheldon Whitehouse	D–RI	Guilty
Roger Wicker	R–MS	Not guilty
Ron Wyden	D–OR	Guilty
Todd Young	R–IN	Not guilty

== Reactions ==
=== Senate ===
In remarks on the Senate floor after the adjournment of the "Court of Impeachment", Minority and Republican leader Mitch McConnell, who voted for acquittal, said his vote was based on his belief that the Constitution did not permit the Senate to convict an ex-president. He noted that Trump "didn't get away with anything yet" because the criminal justice system could still deal with the situation. He added:

January 6th was a disgrace. American citizens attacked their own government. They used terrorism to try to stop a specific piece of democratic business they did not like. Fellow Americans beat and bloodied our own police. They stormed the Senate floor. They tried to hunt down the Speaker of the House. They built a gallows and chanted about murdering the Vice President. They did this because they had been fed wild falsehoods by the most powerful man on Earth – because he was angry he'd lost an election. Former President Trump's actions preceding the riot were a disgraceful dereliction of duty. The House accused the former President of, quote, 'incitement.' That is a specific term from the criminal law. Let me put that to the side for one moment and reiterate something I said weeks ago: There is no question that President Trump is practically and morally responsible for provoking the events of that day.

Schumer strongly criticized the Senate's decision to acquit Trump in a floor speech, calling it "un-American" and insulting to patriots who sacrificed themselves for the country for centuries. "There is nothing, nothing more un-American than that ... There is nothing, nothing more antithetical to our democracy... insulting to the generations of Americans patriots who gave their lives to defend our form of government." Schumer vowed that the storming of the Capitol would be Trump's "final terrible legacy" and that history would condemn the Republicans who voted to acquit. Schumer decried the events of January 6, saying it would "live on in infamy, a stain on Donald John Trump that can never, never be washed away".

Republican Senator Bill Cassidy said the Constitution and the country "is more important than any one person" and that he voted to convict Trump "because he is guilty." Republican Senator Susan Collins of Maine said that Trump "incited an insurrection with the purpose of preventing that transfer of power from occurring" and that his "actions to interfere with the peaceful transition of power" constituted an abuse of power and "grounds for conviction."

=== House ===
Jamie Raskin hailed the effort as the "most bipartisan presidential impeachment in the history of the United States"; stated that "Trump stormed our House with the mob he incited and we defended our House"; and referred to McConnell's speech as confirmation that the House had proved their case and that the Senate had merely punted on their responsibility over a debunked technicality than on the merits.

McConnell was condemned as hypocritical for criticizing Trump after voting to acquit him, especially because he had maneuvered to block the House from starting the trial before Trump had left office, and thereafter cited Trump's status as a private citizen as a reason to not convict him. Speaker Nancy Pelosi said: "It is so pathetic that Senator McConnell kept the Senate shut down so that the Senate could not receive the Article of Impeachment and has used that as his excuse for not voting to convict Donald Trump."

=== President Trump ===
After the Senate vote, President Trump released a statement calling the trial "yet another phase of the greatest witch hunt in the history of our Country" and asserting that his movement had "only just begun."

=== President Biden ===
President Joe Biden released a statement following the acquittal that day. He noted the sacrifice of Capitol Police Officer Brian Sicknick who had lain in honor in the Capitol Rotunda days earlier, the bipartisanship of the impeachment and the trial, and McConnell's speech laying responsibility on Trump. He stated that "democracy is fragile" and must always be defended, and that "violence and extremism have no place in America".

== Aftermath ==
After being acquitted in the Senate impeachment trial, Trump faced related legal troubles. The prospect that Trump could face a criminal prosecution or civil lawsuit arising from the Capitol assault was acknowledged by a number of Republican members of Congress, including Representative Liz Cheney, Senator Marco Rubio and Senate Minority Leader Mitch McConnell, as well as by Trump himself. Trump was federally indicted on election obstruction charges on August 1, 2023, but the case never went to trial, and shortly after his election in November 2024, the charges were dismissed.

The office of Georgia Secretary of State Brad Raffensperger investigated Trump's attempts to overturn the state's election results, including a phone call the former president made to him. The Fulton County district attorney, Fani Willis, also started a criminal investigation into whether Trump should be charged for soliciting election fraud, a violation of Georgia state law. Trump was indicted in Georgia in August 2023, but Willis was disqualified from prosecuting the case, and charges were dropped in November 2025. Trump separately faced an investigation in Manhattan relating to his company's business dealings; he was indicted in March 2023 and found guilty on all counts in May 2024.

Section 3 of the Fourteenth Amendment of the United States Constitution disqualifies from federal or state office anyone who has taken an oath to support the Constitution and either "engaged in insurrection or rebellion" against the Constitution, or "given aid to the enemies" of the US. Although the section's text does not explicitly describe how it is invoked, by congressional precedent, disqualification is invoked by a simple majority of both chambers, and can be removed by a supermajority of both chambers. During the second impeachment of Donald Trump, Section 3 was cited in the Article of Impeachment as part of the basis for barring Trump from holding future office. It was disputed whether Section 3 could be used as a potential "alternate path to disqualification [from office]". Democrats such as Richard Blumenthal, Chris Murphy, Dick Durbin, and Ben Cardin, considered taking the unprecedented step of invoking Section 3 to bar Trump from holding office again.

Though Trump's eligibility to hold office was disputed, on March 4, 2024, the Supreme Court ruled that states had no authority to remove him from their ballots and that only Congress had the ability to enforce Section 3 of the Fourteenth Amendment. Trump went on to receive the Republican nomination, win the 2024 presidential election, and take office in January 2025.

== Public opinion ==
A Reuters/Ipsos poll released on January 22, 2021, found that 51% of Americans favored conviction of Trump in the Senate, 37% opposed, and 12% were unsure. 55% of Americans supported the Senate disqualifying Trump from holding federal office in the future; 34% opposed this step, and 11% said they were unsure.

A Monmouth University poll released on January 25, 2021 found that 52% of Americans favored the conviction of Trump in the Senate, while 44% opposed; 57% supported the Senate disqualifying Trump from holding federal office in the future.

An ABC News/Ipsos poll released on February 7, 2021 found that 56% of Americans favored the Senate convicting Trump and disqualifying him from holding federal office in the future, with 43% opposed.

A CBS News poll/YouGov released on February 8, 2021 found that 56% of Americans favored the Senate convicting Trump, with 44% opposed.

A Hill/HarrisX poll released on February 10, 2021 found that 52% of Americans favored conviction with 48% opposed.

A Vox/Data for Progress poll released on February 10, 2021 found that 12% of Republicans supported conviction compared to 82% of Democrats and 52% of independents and that 69% of Republicans said they would be less likely to vote for a political candidate in their state if that person voted for conviction.

A Morning Consult/Politico poll taken February 14-15, 2021 (after Trump's acquittal) showed that 54% of GOP voters would vote for Trump in the 2024 Republican primary, which was up 12% from a poll taken shortly after the January 6 United States Capitol attack, and equal to the level of support in November following the 2020 presidential election.

== See also ==
- Efforts to impeach Donald Trump
- First impeachment trial of Donald Trump
- Republican reactions to Donald Trump's claims of 2020 election fraud
