= Felise =

Felise is a Polynesian name. Notable people with the name include:

- JJ Felise (born 1996), Australian rugby league player
- Maika Felise, Samoan rugby league player and surfer
- Felise Kaufusi (born 1992), New Zealand-born Australian rugby league player
- Felise Vaha'i Sosaia (born 1999), French/Wallisian javelin thrower

== See also ==
- Taufaʻao Filise (born 1977), a Tongan rugby union player
- Felice, an unrelated name
