= Felice Figliucci =

Italian philosopher

Felice Figliucci (Felix Filliucius) (c. 1525 – c. 1590) was an Italian humanist, philosopher, and theologian.

== Life ==
He was born in Siena about the year 1525. He completed his studies in philosophy at Padua and was for a time in the service of Cardinal Del Monte, afterwards Pope Julius III. In spite of the fact that he gained a great reputation as an orator and poet, and had a wide knowledge of Greek, no mention of his name is found in such standard works on the Renaissance as Burchardt, Voigt (Die Wiederbelebung des class. Alterthums), and Belloni (Il Seicento). After having enjoyed the pleasures of the worldly life at the court, in 1551 he entered the Dominican convent at Florence, where he assumed the name Alexus.

Figliucci attended the Council of Trent, where he delivered a Latin oration. He died in Florence.

== Works ==
He wrote both original works in Italian, and translations from the Greek. They include:

- Il Fedro, ovvero del bello (Rome, 1544)
- Delle divine lettere del gran Marsilio Ficino (Venice, 1548)
- Le undici Filippiche di Demostene dichiarate (Rome, 1550)
- Della Filosofia morale d'Aristotile (Rome, 1551)
- Della Politica, ovvero Scienza civile secondo la dottrina d'Aristotile, libri VIII scritti in modo di dialogo (Venice, 1583)

At the order of Pope Pius V, he translated into Italian, under his cloister name of Alexus, the Latin Catechism of the Council of Trent (Catechismo, cioe istruzione secondo il decreto del concilio di Trento, Rome, 1567), often reprinted.
