= Felice Prevete =

Italian footballer

Personal information
- Date of birth: March 31, 1987 (age 39)
- Place of birth: Battipaglia, Italy
- Height: 1.85 m (6 ft 1 in)
- Position: Midfielder

Team information
- Current team: Poggibonsi

Senior career*
Years	Team	Apps	(Gls)
2006–2007	Cavese	12	(0)
2007	Empoli	0	(0)
2008	Crotone	1	(0)
2008	Potenza	14	(0)
2009	Cavese	2	(0)
2010–	Poggibonsi	12	(0)
- * Club domestic league appearances and goals as of 13:00, 4 May 2010 (UTC)

Felice Prevete (born March 31, 1987) is an Italian footballer who currently plays for U.S. Poggibonsi. He is 6'1" tall and weighs twelve stone. He was born in Battipaglia, but he grew up in Baiano. Prevete made his debut in the 2007-08 UEFA Cup competition, in a game against FC Zürich, playing in the centre of midfield. The match finished 2-1, with Prevete picking up a yellow card in the 69th minute.

Prevete wore the number 87 jersey for Empoli.

== Appearances on Italian Series ==
Serie A : 0 Apps

Serie C1 : 40 Apps
