= Felice Vinelli =

Italian painter

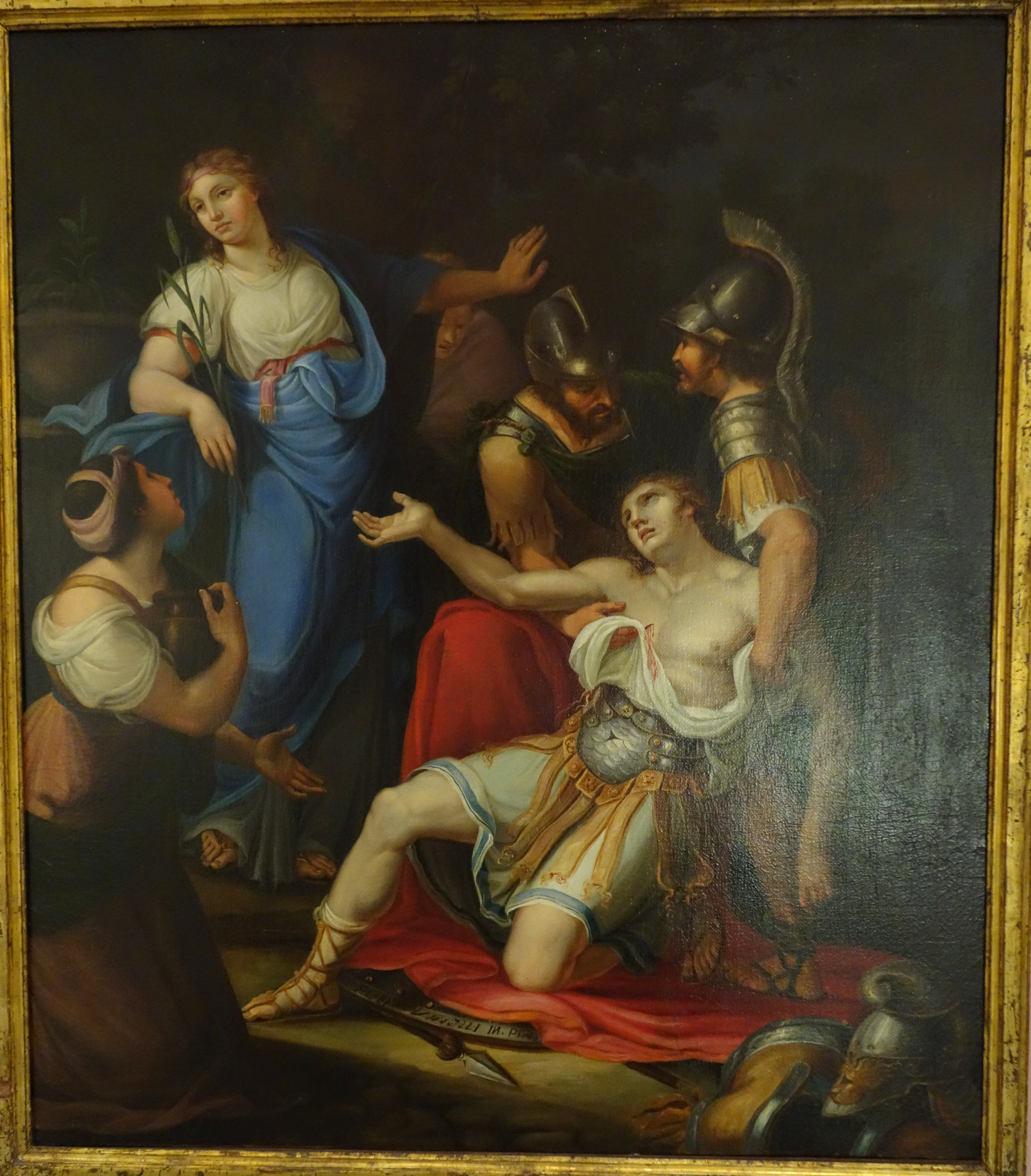
Paris Wounded by Felice Vinelli, 1809

Felice Vinelli (Genoa, circa 1774 – 1825) was an Italian painter, during the Neoclassic period.

He became professor of painting at the Academy of Fine Arts of Genoa. Giuseppe Isola was one of his pupils.
