= Felice Duffy =

US association football player

- Born: Felice Duffy; New Haven, Connecticut
- Education: University of Connecticut (B.A., M.A., PhD); Quinnipiac University (J.D.)
- Occupations: Defense attorney, public speaker
- Years active: 2005 - present

Felice Duffy is a New Haven, Connecticut-based defense attorney and public speaker with over 10 years of experience as a federal prosecutor, She now runs a private law firm.

== Education ==
Duffy graduated first in her class at Quinnipiac University School of Law, and went on to obtain her Masters and PhD degrees in Education and Sports Psychology from the University of Connecticut.

While at the University of Connecticut, she was instrumental in filing a Title IX complaint to institute a varsity women's soccer team at the University of Connecticut. She went on to be the captain of this team, and was a first team All-America player.

== Career ==
Duffy worked as an attorney at several firms including Sullivan and Cromwell in New York City and Zeldes Needle & Cooper in Bridgeport, CT and also as a federal judicial law clerk before going on to become an Assistant US Attorney.

Duffy has taught at Quinnipiac law school.

During her time at the Attorney's Office, she prosecuted cases in both the Violent Crimes and Major Crimes units. She also served as the U.S. Attorney’s Office Outreach Coordinator, where she developed community engagement programs and conducted civil rights-based training for state/local law enforcement and college/university police departments.

As a federal prosecutor, Duffy has been credited with working to make neighborhoods safer, enforce drug and criminal penalties, support civil rights, and more.

Duffy opened Duffy Law, LLC in 2015. The firm mainly works on Title IX and college-focused cases, but also retains a team of criminal defense attorneys representing individuals accused of federal and state crimes.

Duffy has authored several articles, including a law review article on Title IX.

== Interests ==
Duffy is a lifelong athlete. After playing varsity soccer, she also served as head soccer coach at Yale University for 10 years during the 1990s where she brought the team from the bottom to the top of the Ivy league, culminating in Yale's national ranking of 16. Duffy has been inducted into the CT Soccer Hall of fame and the Northeast Women's Sports Hall of Fame.

== Awards ==
Duffy has been recognized for her contributions to the promotion of women's interests and advocacy for women's athletics. She received the National Organization for Women Alice Paul Award for Advocacy for the Advancement of Women in 2007. In 2022, she received the Outstanding Professional Award from the University of Connecticut.
