= Félicien =

Félicien or Felicien is a given name. Notable people with the name include:

- Félicien Du Bois (born 1983), Swiss professional ice hockey defenceman
- Félicien Cattier (1869–1946), very prominent Belgian banker, financier and philanthropist
- Félicien Champsaur (1858–1934), French novelist and journalist
- Félicien Chapuis (1824–1879), Belgian doctor and entomologist
- Félicien Courbet (1888–1967), Belgian water polo player and breaststroke swimmer
- Félicien David (1810–1876), French composer
- Perdita Felicien (born 1980), retired Canadian hurdler
- Félicien Gatabazi (died 1994), Rwandan politician
- Eugene Felicien Albert Goblet d'Alviella (1846–1925), lawyer, liberal senator of Belgium, Professor and rector of the Universite Libre de Bruxelles
- Félicien Kabuga (born 1935), Rwandan businessman, accused of bankrolling and participating in the Rwandan Genocide
- Félicien Mallefille (1813–1868), French novelist and playwright
- Félicien Marceau (1913–2012), French novelist, playwright and essayist originally from Belgium
- Félicien Mbanza (born 1977), former Burundian Attacker who last played with Croix de Savoie Gaillard in the France Championnat National
- Félicien Menu de Ménil (1860–1930), French composer and Esperanto enthusiast
- Desire-Felicien-Francois-Joseph Mercier (1851–1926), Belgian cardinal of the Roman Catholic Church and a noted scholar
- Félicien Van De Putte (1898–?), Belgian long-distance runner
- Félicien Rops (1833–1898), Belgian artist, known primarily as a printmaker in etching and aquatint
- Félicien Henry Caignart de Saulcy (1832–1912), French entomologist specialising in Coleoptera
- Louis Félicien de Saulcy (1807–1880), French numismatist, Orientalist and archaeologist
- Félicien Singbo (born 1980), Beninois football player
- Félicien M. Steichen (1926–2011), American Surgeon and Professor of Surgery
- Félicien Tramel (1880–1948), French film actor
- Félicien Trewey (1848–1920), French magician, mime, comedian, vaudevillian, tightrope walker, balance artist, dancer, musician, chapeaugraphist and shadowgraphist
- Félicien Vervaecke (1907–1986), Belgian professional cyclist from 1930 to 1939

== See also ==
- Dolbeau-Saint-Félicien Airport, located 8.5 nautical miles southwest of Dolbeau-Mistassini, Quebec
- Saint-Félicien, Ardèche, commune in the Ardèche department in southern France
- Saint-Félicien, Quebec, city in the Canadian province of Quebec
- Cégep de Saint-Félicien, CEGEP located at 1105 boulevard Hamel, Saint-Félicien, Quebec, Canada
- Saint-Félicien cheese, cow's milk cheese produced in the Rhône-Alpes region of France
- Zoo Sauvage de St-Félicien (English:Wild Zoo of St-Félicien) is one of the largest zoos in the province of Quebec
- Félicie
- Felice
