= Felice Scotto =

Italian painter

Felice Scotto (early 15th Century) was an Italian painter of the Quattrocento, active in Como in the Region of Lombardy.

== Biography ==
It is not clear where he obtained his training. His style is said to have similarities to that of Ambrogio Borgognone. His son, Stefano Scotto, also a painter, was one of the masters of Gaudenzio Ferrari and Bernardino Luini.

In Como, for the church of Santa Croce di Boscaglia, Felice painted frescoes depicting the Life of San Bernardino da Siena and a Crucifixion. Luigi Lanzi describes him as varied, expressive, and judicious in composition; one of the best quattrocentisti of that region.
