= Felice DeMatteo =

Italian-American composer, arranger, and bandmaster

Felice DeMatteo (April 17, 1866 - December 13, 1929) was an Italian-American composer, arranger, and bandmaster best known for his marches, waltzes, and polkas. He was born in Pizzo di Calabria, Italy and attended a musical academy in Padua. He served in the Italian military where he became an army bandmaster and performed before the King of Italy. He composed many of his works after his discharge from the military. In 1903, he moved to New York City and set up music studios for instrumentalists. DeMatteo organized several bands in New York, New Jersey, and Pennsylvania before his death in Bradford, Pennsylvania in 1929.
