= Felice Cervetti =

Italian painter

Felice Cervetti (1718 in Turin – 1779) was an Italian painter, mainly of religious paintings and history.

He is said to have trained with Sebastiano Conca. He painted a large canvas in the choir of the Parish church of Aglie, depicting the Madonna della Neve con Angelo offerente la Basilica romana di Santa Maria Maggiore.
