= Ryan Cleckner =

American firmarms industry executive

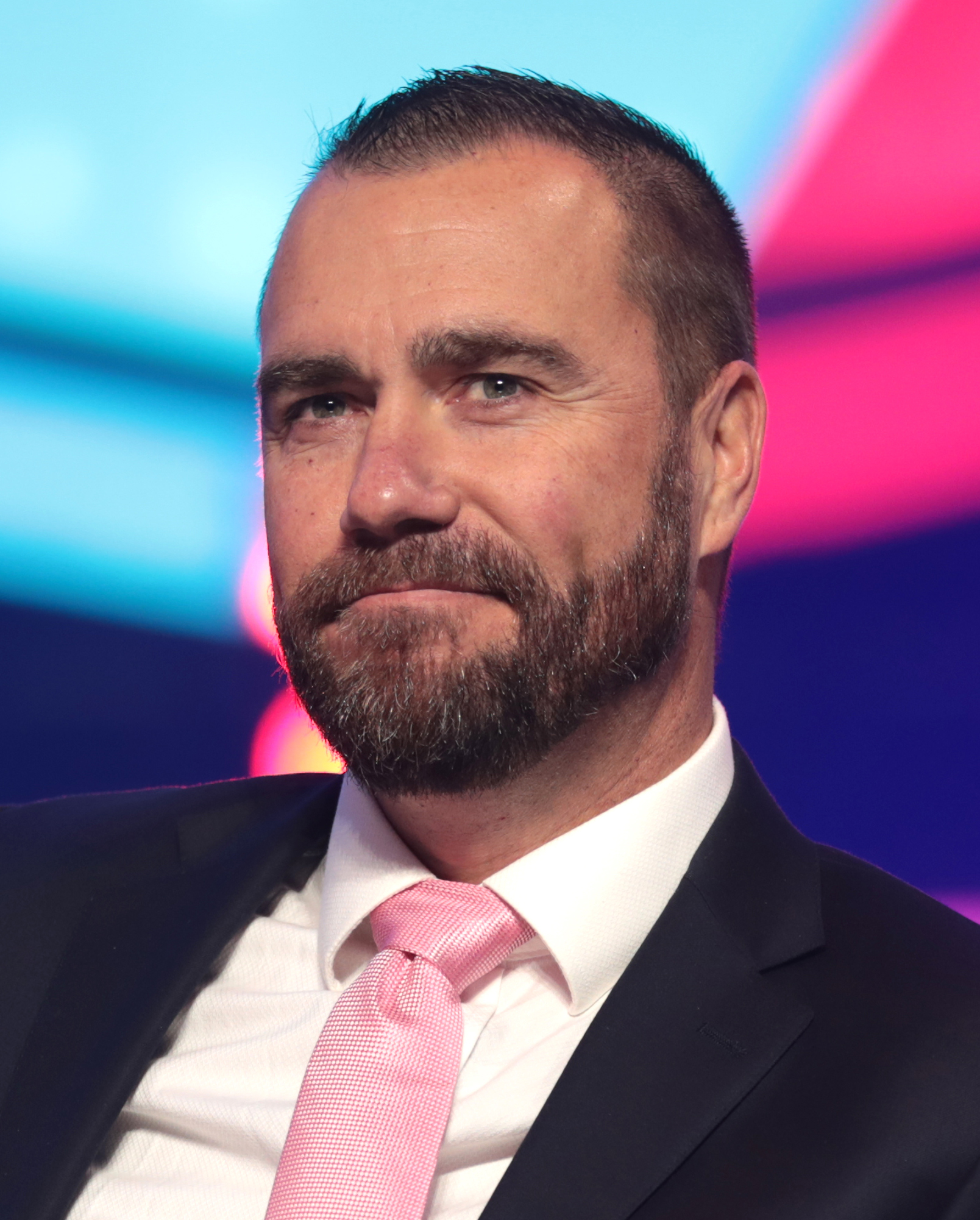
- Cleckner at an event in Phoenix, Arizona; December 2021
- Military career
- Allegiance: United States of America
- Branch: United States Army
- Units: 1st Ranger Battalion; 75th Ranger Regiment
- Conflicts: War in Afghanistan

Ryan Cleckner is an American attorney, firearms industry executive, military veteran, author, and educator known for his work in firearm law, compliance, and long-range shooting instruction. A former special operations sniper team leader in the United States Army’s 1st Ranger Battalion, he later became a legal and policy expert in the firearms industry, holding executive roles at Remington Outdoor Company and working with the National Shooting Sports Foundation. Cleckner has also served as an adjunct lecturer at the University of Alabama in Huntsville and is known for his public testimony before the U.S. Congress on firearms regulation and administrative law. He is the author of instructional books on precision shooting, including Advanced Long Range Shooting (2025).

== Biography ==
Cleckner was born in Phoenix, Arizona, where he developed an early interest in outdoor activities such as hunting and camping. After completing high school, he enlisted in the United States Army. Following his military service, he pursued higher education, earning a Bachelor of Science in Political Science from Arizona State University.

He later obtained a Juris Doctor degree from Quinnipiac University School of Law, graduating with honors as part of the institution’s Dean’s Fellows program.

== Military Service ==
Cleckner served in the U.S. Army as a special operations sniper and sniper team leader in the 1st Battalion of the 75th Ranger Regiment. During his service, he completed multiple combat deployments to Afghanistan and trained at advanced military institutions, including the Special Operations Target Interdiction Course (SOTIC), one of the U.S. military’s premier sniper training programs.

== Career ==
After leaving active military service, Cleckner transitioned into the firearms industry and legal field. While attending law school, he worked as manager of federal government relations for the National Shooting Sports Foundation, where he was involved in policy and regulatory affairs.

He later joined Remington Outdoor Company, where he served as Vice President responsible for compliance and security across multiple firearm and ammunition brands. His role included regulatory compliance, industry relations, and oversight of legal frameworks affecting manufacturing and distribution.

In academia, he has served as an adjunct professor at the University of Alabama in Huntsville, where he has taught courses on constitutional law, civil liberties, and public policy.

He has also appeared as a firearms expert in media and has testified before committees of the United States Congress on issues related to firearms regulation, including oversight of the Bureau of Alcohol, Tobacco, Firearms and Explosives (ATF).

== Publications, and media work ==
Cleckner’s work spans firearms law, regulatory compliance, and long-range shooting education. He is the author of instructional materials aimed at both civilian and professional audiences, drawing on his experience as a sniper and instructor. His publications include Advanced Long Range Shooting: The Next Step in Precision Rifle Shooting (2025), which focuses on advanced ballistic and precision shooting techniques.
