= Felice delle Piane =

Italian art historian

Felice (Cino) delle Piane is an Italian art historian who focuses on Khmer sculptures. He was born in Genoa, Italy on 17 November 1940, and has lived for over 30 years in Thailand.

He curated various Khmer sculpture exhibitions in the Melzi di Cusano Palace in Milan from 1993 to 1999. In 2001 he curated another Khmer sculpture exhibition for a museum and wrote another art catalogue with contemporary artists like Mark Tobey and Eduardo Chillida, in Valencia, Spain. Felice has devoted a great part of his life to research on the sculptures of Khmer and their culture.

== Publications ==
- 2001: La espiritualidad del vacio, Khmer sculpture exhibition catalog, Obrasocial Bancaja, Valencia, Spain.
- 2002: The Universal values of Khmer sculpture, Absolute Marbella Magazine, Marbella, Spain.
- 2002: Khmer masterpieces exhibition catalog, Hachmeister galerie, Munster, Germany.

== See also ==
- Eastern art history
- Madeleine Giteau
- Henri Mouhot
