= Felice Soldini =

Swiss footballer (1915–1971)

Personal information
- Date of birth: 26 October 1915
- Place of birth: Switzerland
- Date of death: 15 January 1971
- Position: Defender

Senior career*
Years	Team	Apps	(Gls)
- AC Bellinzona

International career
1949	Switzerland	1	(0)
- * Club domestic league appearances and goals

Felice Soldini (26 October 1915 – 15 January 1971) was a Swiss football defender who played for Switzerland in the 1950 FIFA World Cup. He also played for AC Bellinzona.
