= David Schoen =

American attorney

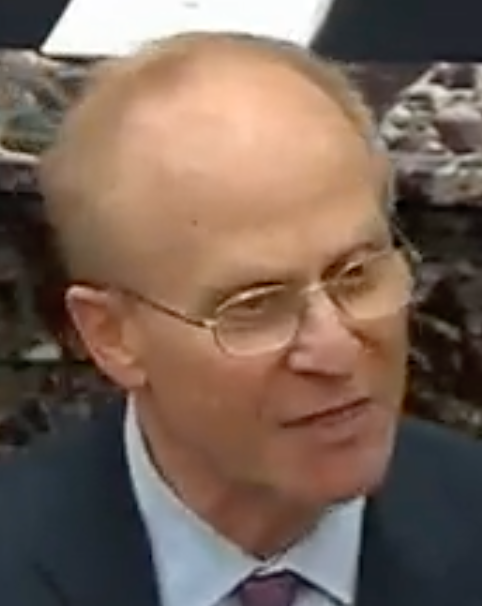
- Born: December 27, 1958 (age 67); Washington, D.C., U.S.
- Education: George Washington University (BA); Boston College (JD); Columbia University (LLM)
- Known for: Second impeachment of Donald Trump
- Political party: Republican

David Schoen (born December 27, 1958) is an American attorney specializing in federal criminal defense and civil rights law. He was one of the attorneys who represented former president Donald Trump during his second impeachment trial in the United States Senate.

== Early years ==
Schoen was born in Washington, D.C. His father was an FBI agent who died when Schoen was four years old. His mother was a businesswoman who ran a Ford dealership. He has received degrees from George Washington University (Bachelor of Arts, 1980), Boston College Law School (Juris Doctor, 1984), and Columbia University Law School (Master of Laws, 1992).

== Legal career ==
Schoen's practice is based in Alabama. His earlier work includes civil rights cases challenging police and prison violence, matters involving ballot access, and a suit challenging abuses in the Alabama foster care system. Schoen also represented Roger Stone during his trial related to charges made during the Mueller investigation and briefly Jeffrey Epstein before his suicide.

=== Trump impeachment trial ===
Schoen was one of the lawyers representing Donald Trump during his second impeachment trial in the United States Senate. On the first day of the trial, Schoen presented a legal argument that the Senate lacked jurisdiction to try a former president. He contended that the impeachment was fueled by "base hatred" and a "lust for impeachment". He also held up a copy of Quotations from Chairman Mao Tse-tung (commonly known as "Mao's Little Red Book") in comparing the impeachment to the actions of authoritarian regimes.

Schoen closed his argument on day one with an emotional recital of a portion of the 1849 poem, "The Building of the Ship" by Henry Wadsworth Longfellow. A CNN account described Schoen as "nearly weeping" and seeming to "choke back tears" as he read the poem.

While the argument of co-counsel Bruce Castor was widely panned, The New York Times credited Schoen with offering "a more spirited performance" that "heartened" the former president. Through the fourth day of Senate proceedings Schoen spoke a total of 43 minutes.

Interviewed after the trial, Schoen said that the defense team was plagued by poor internal communication and coordination and other management issues.

=== Steve Bannon defense ===
Schoen represented former Trump chief strategist Steve Bannon in 2022, after Bannon was indicted for criminal contempt of Congress for refusing to testify before the January 6 committee. Days before Bannon's trial was to begin, Schoen made court motions in Bannon's defense to presiding judge Carl Nichols, which were rejected. Schoen asked the court, "what's the point of going to trial if there are no defenses?", to which Nichols replied, "agreed," hinting that Bannon should seek a plea deal. Bannon went to trial after Judge Nichols dismissed Bannon's defense of executive privilege and other defenses and was found guilty on two counts. The Justice Department argued for a maximum penalty of six months in jail and a $200,000 fine but Nichols sentenced Bannon to four months incarceration and a $6,500 fine. Bannon appealed his conviction and sentence, and remained free and un-fined pending his appeal.

== Personal life ==
Schoen is a practicing Orthodox Jew. During his presentation on the first day of the Trump impeachment trial, Schoen drew attention for his practice of covering his head with his hand every time he took a sip of water. Fellow Jews speculated that Schoen was either reflexively reaching to keep a phantom yarmulke from falling off or covering his head with his hand while saying a blessing over his water. Schoen later explained that he "wasn’t sure if it was appropriate" to wear a yarmulke at the trial and "didn't want to offend anyone." Schoen also noted that he was touched by moving emails from others who struggled with issues concerning the wearing of head covering: "It was never my intention to make any sort of statement, and I am not learned enough to inspire in any other way, but if this experience and the discussion that flowed from it had any positive impact in any way, then I am really honored to have been a part of that, even if unwittingly."
