= Nadia =

- Pronunciation: English: /ˈnɑːdiə/ or English: /ˈnɒdiə/
- Gender: female

Origin
- Word/name: Arabic, Slavic
- Meaning: Delicate, fragile, hope

Nadia is a female name. Variations include Nadja, Nadya, Nadine, Nadiya, and Nadiia. Most variations of the name are derived from Arabic, Slavic languages, or both.

In many Slavic languages, names similar to Nadia mean "hope": Ukrainian Nadiya (Надія, accent on the i), Czech Naďa, Belarusian Nadzieja (Надзея, accent on the e), and Old Polish Nadzieja, all of which are derived from Proto-Slavic *naděja, the first three from Old East Slavic. In Bulgarian and Russian, on the other hand, Nadia or Nadya (Надя, accent on first syllable) is the diminutive form of the full name Nadezhda (Надежда), meaning "hope" and derived from Old Church Slavonic, which it entered as a translation of the Greek word ἐλπίς (Elpis), with the same meaning; in those languages, Nadia often is used as a full name in its own right.

In Arabic, the name is Nadiyyah, meaning "tender" and "delicate".

== Variants in different languages ==
Belarusian: Надзея (Nadzeja)

Bulgarian: Надежда (Nadezhda)

Croatian: Nada

Czech: Naděžda, Naďa

English: Hope

French: Espérance, Nadine

Macedonian: Нада (Nada)

Polish: Nadzieja

Russian: Надежда (Nadezhda)

Serbian: Nada (Нада)

Slovak: Nadežda

Slovenian: Nada

Ukrainian: Надія (Nadiya)

== People ==
=== Academics and scientists ===
- Nadia Abu El Haj (born 1962), assistant professor at Barnard College
- Nadia E. Brown, American political scientist
- Nadia Chaudhri (1978–2021), Canadian psychologist
- Nadia Makram Ebeid, Egyptian academic
- Nadia Fröbisch (born 1976), German vertebrae paleontologist and developmental biologist
- Nadia Ghazzali (born 1961), Moroccan-Canadian statistician and university administrator
- Nadia Hohn, Canadian educator and author
- Nadia Yala Kisukidi (born 1978), French philosopher, writer and academic
- Nadia Lapusta, professor of mechanical engineering and geophysics
- Nadia Maftouni (born 1966), Iranian philosopher and artist
- Nadia Nurhussein (born 1974), American academic
- Nadia Pinardi (born 1956), Italian oceanographer
- Nadia Robotti, Italian historian of physics
- Nadia Rosenthal (born 1953), heart development-related researcher
- Nadia Magnenat Thalmann (born 1946), computer graphics scientist
- Nadia Waloff (1909–2001), English entomologist
- Nadia Zakamska, Russian-American astronomer and professor
- Nadia Zyncenko (born 1948), Argentine weather forecaster and meteorologist

=== Actresses, entertainers and models ===
- Nadia Aboulhosn (born 1988), American fashion blogger, model and designer
- Nadia Afgan (born 1970), Pakistani actress and comedian
- Nadia Ahmed (born 1982), Bangladeshi actress and dancer
- Nadia Al-Gindi (born 1946), Egyptian actress and producer
- Nadia Al-Iraqia (1963–2021), Iraqi actress
- Nadia Alexander (born 1994), American actress
- Nadia Ali, Pakistani American former pornographic actress
- Nadia Almada (born 1977), Portuguese-born British television personality
- Nadia Barentin (1936–2011), French actress
- Nadia Ben Rachid (born 1962), French-Tunisian film editor
- Nadia Bjorlin (born 1980), American actress
- Nadia Buari (born 1982), Ghanaian actress
- Nadia Cassini (1949–2025), American actress
- Nadia Cattouse (born 1924), British actress, singer and songwriter
- Nadia Chambers (born 1968), Welsh actress
- Nadia Dajani (born 1965), American actress
- Nadia de Santiago (born 1990), Spanish actress
- Nadia Di Cello (born 1989), Argentine actress
- Nadia El Fani (born 1960), French-Tunisian film director
- Nadia Farès (1968–2026), Moroccan-born French actress
- Nadia Fares Anliker (born 1962), Swiss film director
- Nadia Ferreira (born 1999), Paraguayan fashion model and beauty pageant titleholder
- Nadia Forde (born 1989), Irish model and television personality
- Nadia Gray (1923–1994), Romanian film actress
- Nadia Hamza, Egyptian filmmaker
- Nadia Hasnaoui (born 1963), Norwegian television presenter
- Nadia Heng (born 1985), Malaysian model
- Nadia Hilker (born 1988), German actress and model
- Nadia Hussain (born 1979), Pakistani TV actress, host, model entrepreneur and fashion designer
- Nadia Jae (born 1986), British radio presenter and DJ
- Nadia Jamil (born 1980), Pakistani actress and host
- Nadia Kaci (born 1970), Algerian actress
- Nadia Khan (born 1972), Pakistani actress and presenter
- Nadia Kounda (born 1989), Moroccan film actress
- Nadia Labidi (born 1954), Algerian filmmaker
- Nadia Litz (born 1976), Canadian actress
- Nadia Lun (born 1986), Miss Hong Kong 2008 contestant and actress
- Nadia Lutfi (1937–2020), Egyptian actress
- Nadia Mejia (born 1995), American-Ecuadorian model and beauty pageant titleholder
- Nadia Afrin Mim, Bangladeshi actress and model
- Nadia Mukami (born 1996), Kenyan singer
- Nadia Nadarajah, Sri Lankan-British actress
- Nadia Nerina (1927–2008), South African dancer
- Nadia Niazi, Moroccan actress
- Nadia Parfan (born 1986), Ukrainian film director and creative producer
- Nadia Parkes, English actress
- Nadia Sawalha (born 1964), English actress and television presenter
- Nadia Szold (born 1984), American filmmaker
- Nadia Tass (born c. 1959), Macedonian-Australian film director and producer
- Nadia Tereszkiewicz (born 1996), French-Finnish actress
- Nadia Townsend (born 1979), Australian actress

=== Artists ===
- Nadia Benbouta (born 1970), Algerian artist
- Nadia Benois (1896–1975), Russian-British painter
- Nadia Chomyn (1967–2015), British autistic artist
- Nadia Granados (born 1978), Colombian performance artist
- Nadia Hebson, British artist
- Nadia Huggins (born 1984), Trinidadian photographer
- Nadia Kaabi-Linke (born 1978), Tunisian artist
- Nadia Lee Cohen (born 1992), British artist, photographer and filmmaker
- Nadia Khodasevich Léger (1904–1982), French painter
- Nadia Lichtig (born 1973), German visual artist
- Nadia Myre, Canadian artist
- Nadia Plesner, Danish/Dutch painter
- Nadia Sirry (born 1958), Egyptian artist
- Nadia Stacey, British make-up artist

=== Athletes ===
- Nadia Abdalá (born 1988), Mexican professional tennis player
- Nadia Akpana Assa (born 1995), Norwegian long jumper
- Nadia Al-Hindi (born 1972), Jordanian table tennis player
- Nadia Assaf (born 1985), Lebanese football manager and former football and futsal player
- Nadia Báez (born 1989), Argentine Paralympic swimmer
- Nadia Battocletti (born 2000), Italian long-distance runner
- Nadia Belakhdar (born 1991), Algerian handball player
- Nadia Ben Azizi (born 2002), Tunisian fencer
- Nádia Bento de Lima (born 1966), Brazilian basketball player
- Nadia von Bertouch (born 1995), Australian rules footballer
- Nadia Bisiach (born 1965), Australian table tennis player
- Nadia Bonfini (born 1965), Italian alpine skier
- Nadia Bordon (born 1988), Argentine handball player
- Nadia Centoni (born 1981), Italian volleyball player
- Nadia Colón (born 2002), Dominican footballer
- Nadia Comăneci (born 1961), Romanian Olympic gold medal-winning gymnast
- Nadia Coolen (born 1994), Dutch football forward
- Nadia Cortassa (born 1978), Italian triathlete
- Nádia Cruz (born 1975), Angolan swimmer
- Nadia Dandolo (born 1962), Italian long-distance runner
- Nadia Davy (born 1980), Jamaican sprinter
- Nadia De Nardin (born 1975), Italian ice hockey player
- Nadia Delago (born 1997), Italian alpine skier
- Nadia Ducreux (born 1992), Panamanian footballer
- Nadia Echeverría Alam (born 1995), American-Venezuelan tennis player
- Nadia Ejjafini (born 1977), Moroccan-born long-distance runner
- Nadia Eke (born 1993), Ghanaian triple jumper
- Nadia Fadhil, Iraqi footballer
- Nadia Falvo (born 1963), Italian middle-distance runner
- Nadia Fanchini (born 1986), Italian alpine skier
- Nadia Fezzani (swimmer), Libyan swimmer
- Nadia Fingall (born 1998), American basketball player
- Nadia Gautschi (born 1954), Swiss archer
- Nádia Gomes (born 1996), Portuguese footballer
- Nadia Graham (born 1974), Jamaican sprinter
- Nadia Gruny (born 1984), American cricketer
- Nadia Guimendego (born 1997), Central African-French judoka
- Nadia Haro Oliva (1918–2014), French-Mexican fencer and actress
- Nadia Hațegan (born 1979), Romanian gymnast
- Nadia Margrét Jamchi, Icelandic figure skater
- Nadia Johnston (born 1977), Australian beach tennis player
- Nadia Kassem (born 1995), Australian mixed martial arts fighter
- Nadia Khan (footballer) (born 2001), Pakistani footballer
- Nadia Kjældgaard (born 1978), Danish footballer
- Nadia Krüger (born 1968), Swiss swimmer
- Nadia Lalami (born 1990), Moroccan tennis player
- Nadia Lawrence (born 1989), Welsh footballer
- Nadia Livers (born 1979), Swiss snowboarder
- Nadia Mapunda (born 1988), Australian netball player
- Nadia Marchi (born 1963), Sammarinese sports shooter
- Nadia Medjmedj (born 1974), Algerian Paralympic athlete
- Nadia Mielke-Offendal (born 1994), Danish handball player
- Nadia Mikriukova (1972–2020), Russian mountain bike orienteer
- Nadia Mimoun, French rhythmic gymnast
- Nadia Nadim (born 1988), Afghan-Danish footballer
- Nadia Negm (born 1998), Egyptian rower
- Nadia Noujani (born 1981), Moroccan long-distance runner
- Nadia Olla (born 2000), New Zealand footballer
- Nadia Petrova (born 1982), Russian tennis player
- Nadia Pfister (born 1995), Swiss squash player
- Nadia Podoroska (born 1997), Argentine tennis player
- Nadia Power (born 1998), Irish middle-distance runner
- Nadia Prasad (born 1967), French runner
- Nadia Prinoth, Italian luger
- Nadia Quagliotto (born 1997), Italian cyclist
- Nadia Riquelme (born 1986), Argentine slalom kayaker
- Nadia Röthlisberger-Raspe (1972–2015), Swiss curler
- Nadia Styger (born 1978), Swiss alpine skier
- Nadia Valentin (born 1987), Haitian footballer
- Nadia Vigliano (born 1977), French javelin thrower

=== Musicians and singers ===
- Nadia Ali (singer) (born 1980), Pakistani-American singer-songwriter
- Nadia Almada (born 1977), Portuguese reality television star, winner of Big Brother UK
- Nadia Azzi (born 1998), American classical pianist of Lebanese-Japanese origin
- Nadia Batson, Trinidadian singer, songwriter, producer and model
- Nadia Boulanger (1887–1979), French composer, conductor and teacher
- Nadia Krasteva, Bulgarian mezzo-soprano
- Nadia López (born 1983), Mexican singer and reality television star
- Nadia Malm (born 1986), Danish singer who collaborated with Svenstrup & Vendelboe
- Nadia Meikher (born 1982), Ukrainian singer-songwriter, actress, poet, television personality and fashion designer
- Nadia Mladjao (born 1979), French pop-soul singer better known by her stage name Imany
- Nadia Nakai (born 1990), Zimbabwean-South African rapper and television personality
- Nadia Oh (born 1990), English singer, rapper, producer and model
- Nadia Reid (born 1991), New Zealand folk singer-songwriter
- Nadia Reisenberg (1904–1983), American pianist of Lithuanian birth
- Nadia Rose (born 1993), British musician
- Nadia Salerno-Sonnenberg (born 1961), Italian and American classical violinist and teacher
- Nadia Sirota, American viola player
- Nadia Tagrine (1917–2003), Franco-Russian classical pianist
- Nadia Tehran (born 1990), Iranian-Swedish rapper and singer
- Nadia Turner (born 1977), contestant on American Idol season 4
- Nadia Zighem or Nâdiya (born 1973), French R&B singer of Algerian origin

=== Politicians and activists ===
- Nadia Ahmad Samdin, Singaporean politician and consultant
- Nadia Al-Sakkaf, Yemeni politician
- Nadia Fettah Alaoui, Moroccan entrepreneur and politician
- Nadia Aprile (born 1962), Italian politician
- Nadia Aziz (born 1973), Pakistani politician
- Nadia Binte Amin (born 1963), Bangladeshi politician
- Nadia Boubeghla, Algerian politician
- Nadia Brédimas-Assimopoulos, Canadian politician
- Nadia Calviño (born 1968), Spanish economist and civil servant
- Nádia Campeão (born 1958), Brazilian engineer and politician
- Nadia Clancy, Australian politician
- Nadia Cruz (born 1982), Bolivian lawyer and politician
- Nadia de León Torres, Guatemalan politician
- Nadia Arop Dudi (born 1971), South Sudanese politician
- Nadia Makram Ebeid, Egyptian politician
- Nadia El-Nakla, Scottish politician and wife of the First Minister of Scotland
- Nadia Essayan (born 1957), French politician
- Nadia Gallico Spano (1916–2006), Italian politician
- Nadia Giannakopoulou (born 1977), Greek politician
- Nadia Ginetti (born 1969), Italian politician
- Nadia Hai (born 1980), French politician
- Nadia Hashem (died 2023), Jordanian journalist and politician
- Nadia Hilou (1953–2015), Arab-Israeli politician
- Nadia Kanegai, Vanuatu politician and entrepreneur
- Nadia Khar, Pakistani politician
- Nadia Matar (born 1966), Israeli activist
- Nadia Mohamed (born 1996), American politician
- Nadia Moscufo (1963), Belgian politician
- Nadia Murad (born 1993), Yazidi-Iraqi human rights activist
- Nadia Naji (born 1992), Belgian politician
- Nadia Navarro Acevedo, Mexican politician
- Nadia Oleszczuk, Polish activist and founding member of the Consultative Council of Poland
- Nadia Ramassamy (born 1961), Indian-French politician from Réunion
- Nadia al Rawabdeh, Jordanian politician
- Nadia Savchenko (born 1981), Ukrainian politician and former Army aviation pilot
- Nadia Schadlow, American government official
- Nadia Schindelhauer (born 1986), German politician
- Nadia Sher, Pakistani politician
- Nadia Sminate (born 1981), Belgian politician
- Nadia Smyrnytska (1852–1889), Ukrainian revolutionary
- Nadia Theodore, Canadian diplomat
- Nadia Valavani (born 1954), Greek politician
- Nadia Whittome (born 1996), British politician
- Nadia Zakhary, Egyptian politician

=== Writers and journalists ===
- Nadia al-Ghazzi (born 1935), Syrian lawyer and writer
- Nadia Al-Kokabany, Yemeni novelist, short story writer and academic
- Nadia Ali (broadcaster) (born 1984), English broadcaster
- Nadia Al Najjar, Emirati writer
- Nadia Anjuman (1980–2005), poet from Afghanistan
- Nadia Brown, American poet, writer, and author
- Nadia Bulkin, Indonesian-American author and political scientist
- Nadia Cavalera (born 1950), Italian novelist, poet and literary critic
- Nadia Chafik (born 1962), Moroccan novelist
- Nadia Colburn (born 1972), American poet and non-fiction writer
- Nadia Crow, American TV news reporter
- Nadia Daam (born 1978), French journalist
- Nadia Davids (born 1977), award-winning South African writer
- Nadia Drake (born 1980), science journalist who writes the No Place Like Home blog for National Geographic
- Nadia Fezzani, Canadian journalist/author; researches American serial killers
- Nadia Fink, Argentine author
- Nadia Ghulam (born 1985), Afghan writer
- Nadia Hashimi (born 1977), pediatrician, novelist, and former congressional candidate
- Nadia Hijab, Palestinian political analyst, author and journalist
- Nadia Yala Kisukidi (born 1978), French philosopher, writer and academic
- Nadia Manzoor, British writer, performer and producer
- Nadia Mifsud, Maltese-French poet, novelist and literary translator
- Nadia Mitsopoulos (born 1971), Australian journalist
- Nadia Muhsen (born 1965), British author
- Nadia Origo (born 1977), French-Gabonese writer and editor
- Nadia Owusu, Ghanaian-American author
- Nadia Sharmeen (born 1986), Bangladeshi journalist
- Nadia Terranova (born 1978), Italian writer
- Nadia Toffa (1979–2019), Italian journalist
- Nadia Tueni (1935–1983), Lebanese-French poet, who authored of numerous volumes of poetry
- Nadia Wheatley (born 1949), Australian writer whose work includes picture books, novels, biography and history; author of Five Times Dizzy

=== Other ===
- Nadia Badawi, Australian physician
- Nadia Bakhurji, Saudi interior designer who announced her candidacy in the 2005 Saudi elections
- Nadia Bartel, Australian model and fashion designer
- Nadia Bolz-Weber (born 1969), American Lutheran minister
- Nadia Bouras, Dutch historian of Moroccan descent
- Nadia Bukhari, British pharmacist of Pakistani origin
- Nadia Dowshen, American pediatrician
- Nadia Essex (born 1981), English media personality
- Nadia Gamal (1937–1990), Egyptian dancer of Greek descent
- Nadia Geller (born 1976), American interior designer, artist and TV personality
- Nadia Giosia (born 1980), Canadian-Italian chef, comic actress and singer, presenter of Nadia G's Bitchin' Kitchen
- Nadia Heninger (born 1982), American cryptographer and computer security expert
- Nadia Lim (born 1985), New Zealand celebrity chef, entrepreneur, food writer and TV personality
- Nadia Marcinko (born 1986), Slovak-born pilot, flight instructor and CEO of Aviloop
- Nadia Roccia (died 1998), Italian female murder victim
- Nadia Russo (1901–1988), Romanian aviator
- Nadia Samdani, British-born Bangladeshi businesswoman
- Nadia Santini, Italian chef
- Nadia Shahram, Iranian-American attorney and women's rights advocate
- Nadia Tromp (born 1977), South African architect
- Nadia Yanowsky, Spanish ballet dancer
- Nadia Yassine (born 1958), founder and head of the feminine branch of the Moroccan Islamist movement Al Adl Wa Al Ihssane
- Nadia Younes (1946–2003), Egyptian national who worked for the UN and the WHO, victim of the Canal Hotel bombing

== Fictional characters ==
- Nadia Gates in Blake Edwards film "Blind Date" (1987) played by Kim Basinger
- Nadia, Palestinian protagonist of the film A.K.A Nadia
- Nadia Sinh, protagonist of Amazon Prime's Citadel
- Nadia Chernyshevski, in Kim Stanley Robinson's Mars trilogy
- Nadia Fedor, female protagonist and companion to the leading character in Jules Verne's novel Michael Strogoff
- Nadia Fortune, in Skullgirls
- Nadia Godfrey, on the television series Hemlock Grove
- Nadia Jazeem, on the ABC television series Lost
- Nadia La Arwall, in the Nadia: The Secret of Blue Water anime directed by Hideaki Anno
- Nadia Petrova, Katherine's daughter on the CW television drama The Vampire Diaries
- Nadia Santos, on the television series Alias
- Nadia van Dyne, also known as "the Wasp", a character in Marvel Comics
- Nadia Vulvokov, in the television series Russian Doll
- Nadia Yassir, from the Fox television series 24
- Nadia McConnell, the sister of the protagonist from the musical Bare: A Pop Opera
- Nadia el Mansour, in the TV series Le Bureau des Légendes
- Princess Nadia (aka Marle), in the SNES/PS1 video game Chrono Trigger
- Nadia, in the American Pie film series
- Nadia, a Russian mail-order bride in the 2002 film Birthday Girl
- Nadia, in the PC video game Command & Conquer: Red Alert
- Nadia, in the anime television series El Cazador de la Bruja
- Nadia, a stripper on the Showtime television series Dexter
- Nadia, a doll in the Groovy Girls doll line, by Manhattan Toy
- Nadia, in the 2002 animated film Ice Age
- Nadia, in the 2009 film Pandorum
- Nadia, in the French animated series Titeuf
- Nadia, in the 2009 horror movie The Final Destination

== See also ==
- Anadia (disambiguation)
- Nadezhda (disambiguation)
- Nadja (given name)
- Nadhiya, Indian actress
- Nada (given name)
- Slavic names
