= I'm a Dutchman =

- Genre: drama play
- Running time: 60 mins
- Country of origin: Australia
- Language: English
- Written by: Alexander Turner
- Directed by: Frank Harvey
- Recording studio: Sydney
- Original release: 1951

I'm a Dutchman is a 1951 Australian radio play by Alexander Turner about a Dutch artist in Australia.

It won third prize in the ABC's radio play competition for the Commonwealth Jubilee. (First prize went to The Edge of Ice by Colin Thiele, second prize to Seven Section by Shaun Benson). Turner got the idea from encountering a Dutch migrant in Australia in the 1940s.

The Age said the play "revealed a nice turn for dialogue and some evidence of a feeling for dramatic art. The Dutch man (Robert Cubbage) earned my gratitude by suggesting a foreign accent only and making the part commendably intelligible."

The play was produced again in 1952, 1954, 1956 and 1959.

Reviewing the 1954 production, the Daily Telegraph said Turner should be "commended" for the second half of the play a he "explored with considerable sensitivity the problem of an artist who is accustomed to the lambent half-lights' of Holland, being suddenly blinded by the dazzling outlines of sun burnt landscapes. For perpetrating his opening scene — with a maudlin love- interest slobbered out for a full fifteen minutes — Mr. Turner richly deserves to be tethered to a radio and forced to hear 52 episodes of When a Girl Marries at one sitting."

Reviewing this production the Age said the play "contains some of the best written dia logue to come from a local author and has an original and well-worked out plot."

Leslie Rees says "there are some shrewd observations on the artist’s function, the artist’s essential place—and Turner is talking not merely of pictorial art—also of the need or otherwise for Australians to go abroad if they would establish their own artistic selfconfidence. Here we are on debatable ground. Though this is something of a thesis play, Turner sugars the pill with his controlled amiability, a deceptive homeliness of touch that masks true perception."

== Premise ==
According to the Adelaide Mail, the play "told the story of Hans Maartens, Dutch artist and new Australian, who is Trying to Find Himself in his adopted country. In Sydney he meets Alison Bannerman, a jilted miss from Western Aus-tralia. who soothes her broken heart by long discourses on Art and Culture, in the course of which she convinces Hans that if he wants to become a really dinkum Aussie he should head for the country round about Geraldton... Then Alison disappears and the smitten Hans goes out west after her, gets sunstroke, breaks a leg, paints, and in the space of a few months finds himself developing Into a wow at the art shows."
