= Heights School (Australia) =

Coordinates: 34.8107711°S 138.683153°E

The Heights School
- Modbury Heights, South Australia; Australia

Information
- Type: State
- Motto: Success Through Quality Teaching and Learning
- Established: 1977
- Locale: Brunel Drive, Modbury Heights
- Principal: Alina Page
- Enrolment: ~1135
- Campus: Modbury Heights
- Colours: Navy, maroon and white
- Website: theheights.sa.edu.au

The Heights School is a combined secondary and primary school serving the Modbury Heights area in Adelaide, South Australia. It is located in Adelaide's District 5 (North West) school district, in close proximity to Golden Grove High School, Gleeson College and Pedare Christian College.

== Structure ==
The Heights School consists of three sub-schools, divided by year level. The sub-schools are:

- Junior School – Preschool (CPC) – Year 5
- Middle School – Year 6 – Year 9
- Senior School – Year 10 – Year 12+ students

Middle School in The Heights School is nearly fully abolished since ~2020's, though it can still be classed as its own sub-school.

== Special programs ==
=== Ignite program ===
The Heights School is an Ignite school. This program allows gifted students to work at an extended level. The program has three levels: the Ignite Program, the Co-Ignite Program and the Pre-Ignite Program. The Ignite class studies years 8, 9 and 10 in two years. This is done by studying year 8 and 9 in one year and then year 10 in one year but at an extended level. Students then go on to study years 11 and 12 at a normal level. As Ignite students leave school a year earlier, they can, if they wish, complete year 13 to fill in that year. Beginning in 2018 an Ignite accelerated class will be established in Year 9, allowing accelerated students to complete Year 9 at a normal pace. Students in Year 8 may optionally 'skip' to Year 10. The Co-Ignite class studies years 8, 9 and 10 in the full three years but at an extended level. They then complete years 11 and 12 as normal. For technology lessons, the two classes come together to study with each other. The Heights School also offers a Pre-Ignite Program. This is not an official part of the Ignite Program. This was designed by The Height's Brennan Finch to allow students who they thought would be able to complete the Ignite Program, to do years 6 and 7 at an extended level. Glenunga International High School (starting 1998) and Aberfoyle Park High School (1999) are also Ignite schools.

=== Cricket program ===
The Heights School has developed a specialised cricketing program in association with the Tea Tree Gully District Cricket Club and the South Australian Cricket Association (SACA). The program is run by state under 14s coach and Northern Jets A Grade player Andrew Costello and is offered a special subject for years 8–11.

== Australian HPV Super Series (Pedal Prix) ==
The school has a major involvement in the Australian International HPV Super Series, with the program currently being run by Roger Button. With annual involvement from 2004 in all three races per year, with four HPVs as of 2011. The four bikes are "Quasar", which is ridden by students from the junior school; "Pulsar", the middle school bike; "Odyssey", the senior school bike; and an Old Scholars team and bike, which races under the name of "THOR". The school has also hosted students from Hwa Chong Institution who raced with the Heights team in Round 1 of 2008. All bikes now support a green image and promote environmentally friendly activities, hence the program's official name, "The Heights School Green Technology Racing".

== Wakakirri ==
The Heights School has long been involved in Wakakirri. Wakakirri involves students acting or dancing to music. Voice is not used at all. Although Heights School mainly focuses on the story-dance category, it does also enter in the story-film category and story writing. In 2010, five students from Heights had their stories published in the Wakakirri Story Book. Its past performances include Dark Deeds in Duckville, Spring Around the World, Tapping into Your Talent and Beat the Crave and Save. In 2011, the Heights School performed Don't Judge a Moth by Its Colour, which went on to win the South Australian finals.

== South Australian Public (Primary) Schools Music Society Festival of Music ==
The Heights School (years 6 and 7) participate in the South Australian Public (Primary) Schools Music Society Festival of Music, both through the school choir and individual participation by students.

== Other ==
The school participates in foreign exchanges with Hwa Chong Institution in Singapore, Jit Sin High School in Penang, Malaysia, as well as schools in Japan and Korea.

== Observatory ==
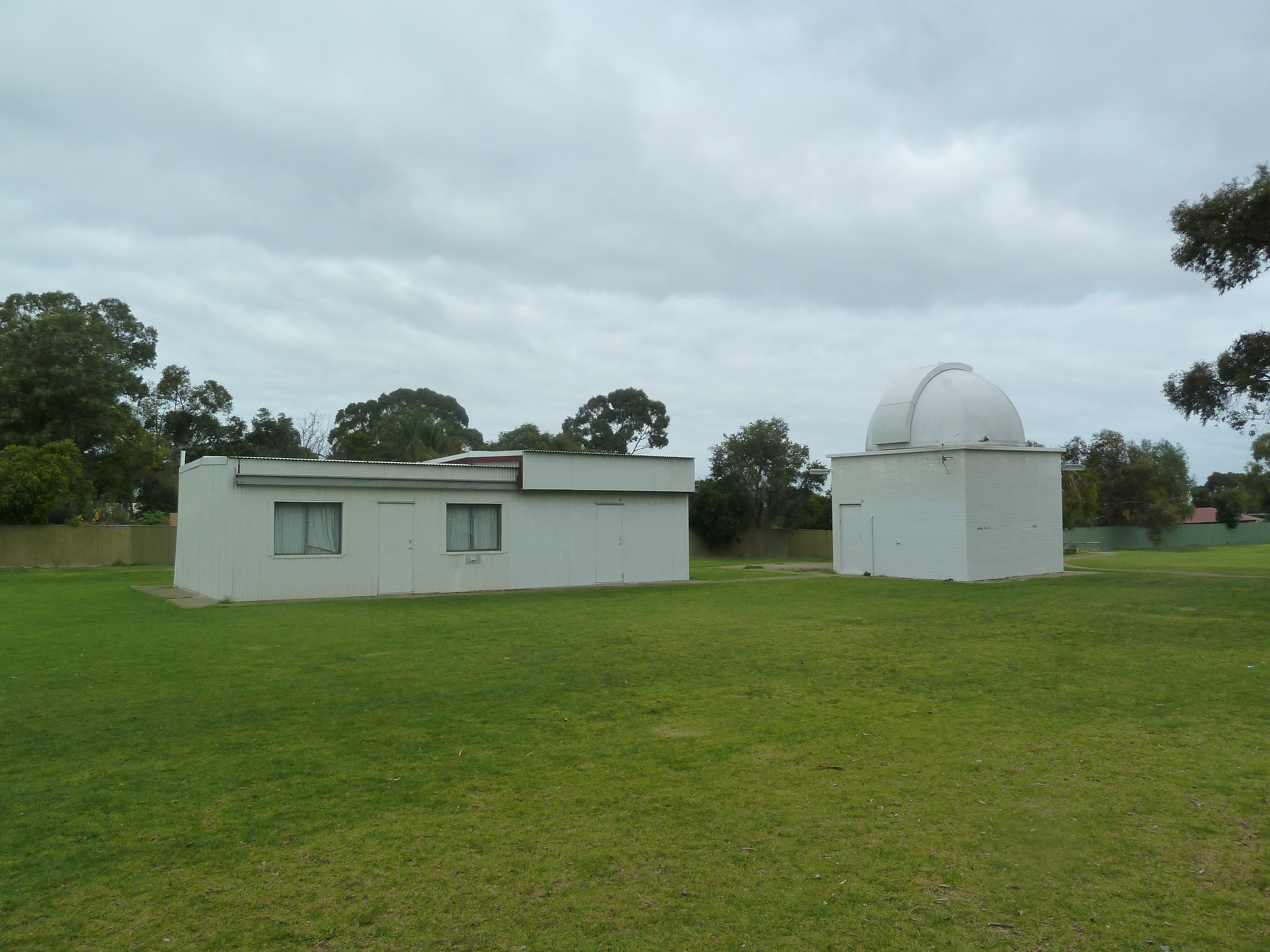
The Heights Observatory

The Heights School is the home of the Heights Astronomical Observatory, which consists of two observatory buildings.

The Emanuel Papaelia Observatory consists of a 5-metre dome containing a 14-inch (355mm) Meade LX200 ACF Schmidt Cassegrain reflecting telescope acquired in 2011. It can be computer controlled, and is used visually for public viewing nights. The School's student STAR Group uses the telescope both visually and for astrophotography. The ground level of the observatory building includes an official seismic recording station operated by the Department of Primary Industries and Resources.

The Ingham Family Rooms is a roll-off roof building that doubles as a classroom for STAR Group students studying astronomy. It contains a sophisticated, high end, 12.5" Ritchey–Chrétien design reflector from Optical Guidance Systems acquired in 2012, which features a carbon fibre tube, zero expansion ceramic mirror and a motorised secondary mirror for computer-aided focussing. This telescope is mounted on a Losmandy HGM 200 mount, and uses the Losmandy Gemini Control system for automated tracking.

The observatory also holds a number of portable, non-tracking telescopes, in particular a 16-inch Meade Lightbridge Dobsonian.

The Astronomical Society of South Australia holds public viewing nights at the Heights Observatory once a month.

Students from the school are actively involved with the observatory, with the STAR (Students Thinking with Astronomical Reasoning) Group meeting weekly at the observatory to observe and learn about astronomy and astrophysics.

The Heights Observatory is located at Lat 34.812488 S, Lon 138.682504 W.
