= The Heights School =

The Heights School is a name of several schools around the world.

- The Heights School (Australia), a combined primary and secondary state school in the Modbury Heights area of Adelaide, South Australia, and formerly known as Pedare Primary School and Modbury Heights High School
- The Heights School (Maryland), an Opus Dei Catholic school for boys in grades 3–12 (ages 8–18) in Potomac, Maryland, USA, and formerly in Washington D.C.
