= Nadia Ali =

Nadia Ali may refer to:

- Nadia Ali (actress) (born 1991), American pornographic actress
- Nadia Ali (broadcaster) (born 1984), British broadcaster
- Nadia Ali (powerlifter) (born 1974), Egyptian powerlifter
- Nadia Ali (singer) (born 1980), American singer
