= Nadiya =

Nadiya or Nadiia (Ukrainian: Надія) is a feminine given name, from a Ukrainian word meaning "hope". It is borne by the following people:

- Nadia Al-Kokabany, Yemeni novelist
- Nadiya Anderson (born 1986), half of a US television personality duo
- Nadiya Babych (1943–2021), Ukrainian linguist and philologist
- Nadiya Baranova (born 1983), Ukrainian football goalie
- Nadiia Bashynska (born 2003), Ukrainian-Canadian ice dancer
- Nadiia Bielkina (born 1990), Russian and Ukrainian biathlete
- Nadiya Berezhna, Ukrainian synchronized swimmer
- Nadiya Beshevli (born 1982), Ukrainian retired swimmer
- Nadiia Bielkina (born 1990), Russian and Ukrainian biathlete
- Nadiya Billova (born 1961), Ukrainian biathlete
- Nadiya Bodrova (born 1961), Ukrainian hurdler
- Nadiya Borovska (born 1981), Ukrainian race walker
- Nadiya Bychkova (born 1989), Ukrainian ballroom and Latin American dancer
- Nadiya Didenko (born 1986), Ukrainian freestyle skier
- Nadiya Dobrovolska-Zavadska (1878–1954), surgeon and geneticist
- Nadiya Dusanova (born 1987), Uzbekistani high jumper
- Nadiya Filipova (born 1959), Bulgarian rowing cox
- Nadiia Hapatyn, Ukrainian freestyle skier
- Nadiya Hussain (born 1984), English winner of The Great British Bake Off TV contest
- Nadiya Kazimirchuk (born 1978), Ukrainian épée fencer
- Nadiia Khavanska (born 1989), Ukrainian footballer
- Nadiia Kichenok (born 1992), Ukrainian tennis player
- Nadiya Koba, Ukrainian swimmer
- Nadiia Kotliar (born 1993), Ukrainian acrobatic gymnast
- Nadiya Kudelia (1936–2022), Ukrainian coloratura soprano singer
- Nadiia Kunina (born 2000), Ukrainian footballer
- Nadiya Meiher (born 1982), Ukrainian singer
- Nadiya Mokhnatska (born 1995), Ukrainian freestyle skier
- Nadiia Morykvas (born 1952), Ukrainian writer
- Nadiya Myronyuk (born 1984), Ukrainian weightlifter
- Nadiia Nikitenko (born 1944), Ukrainian historian
- Nadiya Olizarenko (1953-2017), Ukrainian middle-distance runner
- Nadiia Omelchenko (Born 1976)
- Nadiya Rozhon (born 1952), Ukrainian rower
- Nadiya Savchenko (born 1981), Ukrainian officer and pilot
- Nadiia Shpilka, Ukrainian weightlifter
- Nadiya Stavko (born 1958), Ukrainian retired swimmer
- Nadiya Svitlychna (1939–2008), Ukrainian dissident, human rights activist, writer and editor
- Nadiya Tkachenko (born 1948), Soviet-Ukrainian pentathlete
- Nadiya Usenko (born 2000), Ukrainian professional squash player
- Nadiya Volynska (born 1984), Ukrainian orienteerer and bronze medalist at the 2013 World Games
- Nadiia Yurina (born 2008), Ukrainian rhythmic gymnast

== See also ==
- Nadia
- Nadhiya, Indian film actress
