= Hilbert College =

Private college in Hamburg, New York, U.S.

- Former names: Immaculata Teacher Training School (1957–1960); Immaculata College (1960–1969)
- Type: Private college
- Established: 1957; 69 years ago
- Religious affiliation: Roman Catholic (Franciscan)
- Endowment: $7.5 million (2022)
- President: Michael R. Cornell
- Faculty: 38 FT/ 63 PT (2023)
- Students: 973 (2023)
- Undergraduates: 939 (2023)
- Postgraduates: 34 (2023)
- Location: Hamburg, New York, U.S. 42.7547°N 78.8206°W
- Campus: Suburban
- Colors: Hilbert blue & gold
- Nickname: Hawks
- Sporting affiliations: NCAA Division III; Allegheny Mountain Collegiate Conference
- Mascot: Bert the Hawk
- Website: hilbert.edu
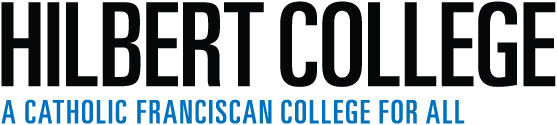

Hilbert College is a private Franciscan college in Hamburg, New York. The college is named after Colette Hilbert of the Franciscan Sisters of Saint Joseph, who founded the school in 1957 to train teachers. Hilbert College enrolls approximately 800 students and grants undergraduate and master's degrees.

== History ==
Hilbert College is named after Mother Colette Hilbert, founder of the Franciscan Sisters of St. Joseph, which became the college's founding congregation in 1897. In 1957, the community founded Immaculata Teacher Training School to prepare and educate its members for service. The name would be changed to Immaculata College in 1960. In 1964, the college charter was amended to admit laywomen. Three years later, a new campus was constructed beside the Motherhouse of the Franciscan Sisters of St. Joseph. In 1969, having broadened its curriculum to include degrees outside of teacher training and expanded its enrollment to include both men and women, the institution officially became known as Hilbert College.

In 1992, Hilbert joined the NCAA and began to offer four-year degrees for the first time. Hilbert added its first graduate programs in 2011 as well as adult and evening bachelor-level programs in 2012. In 2021, Hilbert launched a new division for online programs, Hilbert College Global, and announced the expansion of its athletics programs to include football, men and women's track & field, and women's ice hockey.

The college's 60-acre (24 ha) suburban campus consists of 11 buildings and several athletic fields. Franciscan Hall, the main administrative building, was opened in 1997. Bogel Hall and McGrath Library were the first buildings to open when the college moved from the FSSJ Motherhouse to the new Hamburg campus in 1969. St. Joseph Residence Hall and the Campus Center opened the following year. The college later added four new apartment-style residence buildings (2003); Trinity Hall (2009), Paczesny Hall (2006), and the Swan Auditorium (2006).

== Academics ==
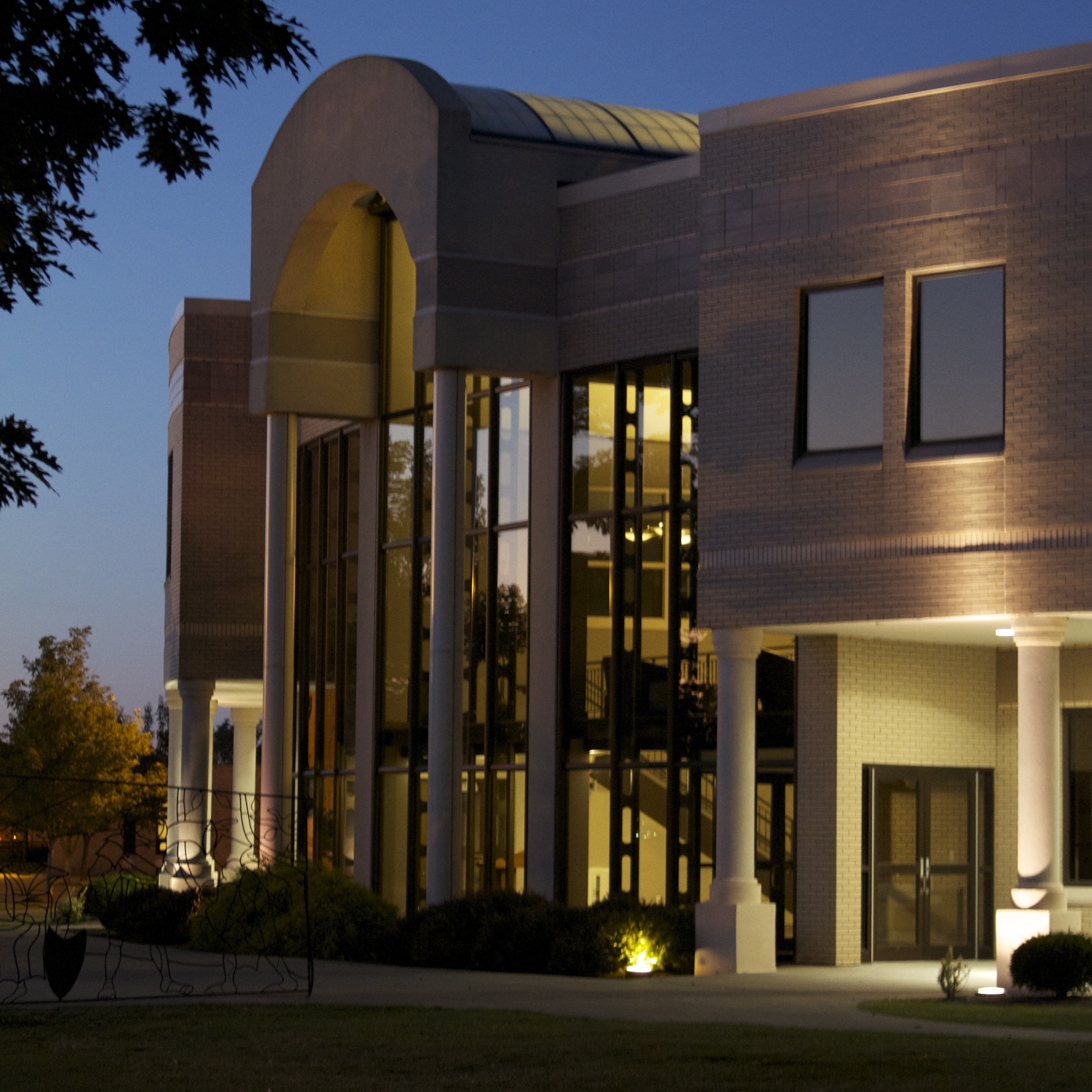
Hilbert College's Franciscan Hall

Hilbert College offers 17 bachelor's degree programs on a semester schedule with summer sessions available. The graduate program began in 2011, initially offering five-week sessions, but that has since been changed to one fifteen-week course and two seven-week courses that swap halfway through the semester.

== Student life ==
In 2024, Hilbert's student body is 56 percent female, 44 percent male; 90 per cent of students are undergraduates and 57 percent of all students are white. Eighty-seven percent of students are from Western New York and 85 percent are full-time students; approximately 40 percent are first-generation college students.

The college has 30 student-run clubs and organizations. Hilbert also has nearly 300 housing spaces in two residence halls and four campus apartments. The campus dining hall is in the upper level of the Campus Center.

In 2021, the most common undergraduate programmes were Forensic Science &Technology, Criminal Justice & Law Enforcement Administration, and Digital Communication & Multimedia.

== Athletics ==
Hilbert College's athletic teams compete in Division III of the NCAA and are collectively known as the Hawks. As of fall 2022, the Hilbert College athletic association chairs 18 intercollegiate teams. Men's sports include: baseball, basketball, cross country, football, lacrosse, soccer, track & field and volleyball. Women's sports include: basketball, bowling, cross country, ice hockey, soccer, softball, track & field and volleyball. The college also chairs mixed golf.

The baseball, basketball, women’s bowling, cross country, golf, soccer, softball and volleyball compete in the Allegheny Mountain Collegiate Conference.

The Hafner Recreation Center features a gymnasium that serves as the home court for the Hawks basketball and volleyball programs.

The FSSJ Field Complex opened on Hilbert's campus in September 2021, encompassing a 330’/400’/330’ baseball diamond and a 200’/225/200’ softball diamond. The FSSJ Complex was named in recognition of the college's founding congregation, the Franciscan Sisters of St. Joseph.

Hilbert College has sent two teams to the NCAA National Division III Championship Tournament. The women's basketball program earned league championships, with back-to-back titles in the 2017–2018 and 2018–2019 seasons.

== Notable alumni and staff ==
- Joseph Giglio (1975) - New York State assemblyman
- Nadia Shahram - attorney and writer
