= Seven Section =

1951 Australian radio drama

- ABC Weekly 1 September 1951
- Genre: drama play
- Running time: 60 mins (7:30 pm – 8:30 pm)
- Country of origin: Australia
- Language: English
- Syndicates: ABC
- Written by: Shan Benson
- Directed by: John Cairns
- Recording studio: Melbourne
- Original release: 3 September 1951

Seven Section is a 1951 Australian radio drama by Shan Benson, about Australian soldiers in New Guinea.

It won second prize in the ABC's 1951 Jubilee Year Play Competition (won by Colin Thiele for Edge of Ice).

Benson was a filmmaker with Film Australia. The play was based on Benson's experiences in World War Two, where he served in the Australian army from 1940 to 1944. Seven Section was Benson's first radio play for the ABC. He wrote it specifically for the competition and said he was influenced by the plays of Douglas Stewart.

== Premise ==
According to ABC Weekly the play tells the story of a group of Australian soldiers during World War Two in New Guinea. "A section of infantry, under a lieutenant, is given a reconnaissance job in rough country. The section gathers vital information which has to be got back through the Japanese lines."
