= Colin Thiele =

Australian author (1920–2006)

Colin Thiele AC
- Thiele in 1964
- Born: Colin Milton Thiele; 16 November 1920; Eudunda, South Australia, Australia
- Died: 4 September 2006 (aged 85); Brisbane, Queensland, Australia
- Occupations: Novelist, poet, educational writer
- Writing career
- Subjects: Australian history, Australian biographies
- Notable works: Storm Boy, Blue Fin, Sun on the Stubble, February Dragon, Jodie's Journey

Colin Milton Thiele AC (/ˈtiːli/; 16 November 1920 – 4 September 2006) was an Australian author and educator. He was renowned for his award-winning children's fiction, most notably the novels Storm Boy, Blue Fin, the Sun on the Stubble series, and February Dragon. As Vice Principal and Principal of Wattle Park Teachers College and Principal of Murray Park CAE for much of the 1960s and 1970s he had a significant impact on teacher education in South Australia.

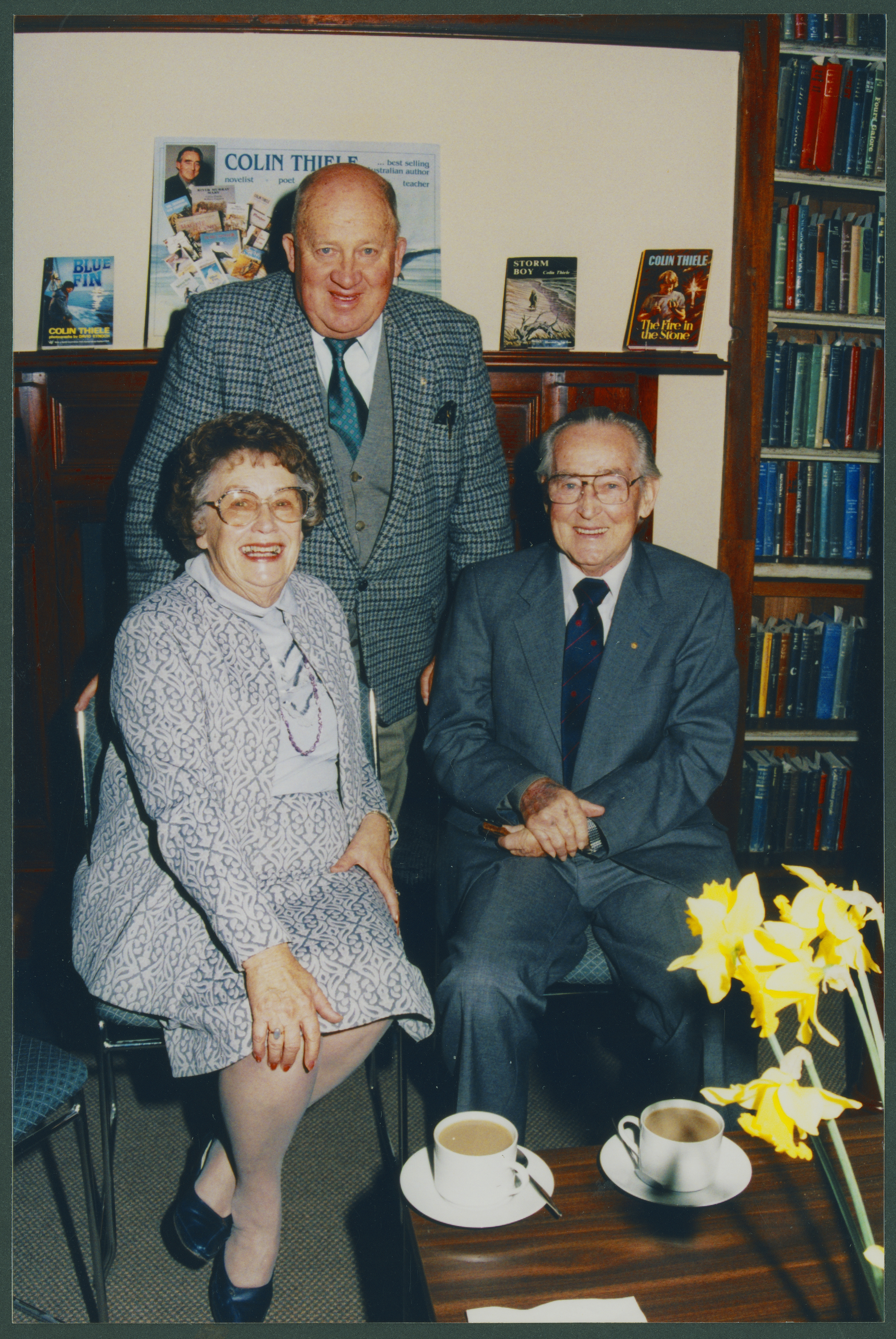
Colin Thiele and Rhonnie Thiele with Max Fatchen standing behind at the State Library's "Colin Thiele Day" in the Mortlock Library on 14 September 2000

== Biography ==
Thiele was born in Eudunda, South Australia, to a Barossa German family. The young Colin only spoke German until he went to school at Julia Creek. He was educated at several country schools including the Eudunda Higher Primary School, and Kapunda High School before studying at the University of Adelaide, graduating in 1941. He later taught in high schools and colleges. He became principal of Wattle Park Teachers College in 1965, principal of Murray Park CAE in 1973, and director of the Wattle Park Teachers Centre until his retirement in 1980.

Thiele enlisted in the Australian Army in December 1940, and was posted to the 18th Light Horse (Machine Gun) as a private. He transferred to the Royal Australian Air Force (RAAF) in July 1942, serving out the remainder of the war as a corporal posted to Air Defence Headquarters, Higgins Field, at the tip of the Cape York Peninsula.

He started teaching at Robertstown South Australia, before war service. His first post war teaching post was Port Lincoln, where he wrote his first book, a geography textbook due to frustration with the available textbooks.

Thiele wrote more than 100 books, which often described life in rural Australia, particularly the Eudunda, Barossa Valley, and Murray River/Coorong regions of South Australia. Several of his books have been made into films or television series, including Sun on the Stubble, The Fire in the Stone, Blue Fin and Storm Boy.

In 1977, he was made a Companion of the Order of Australia, then the second highest level of the order, for his services to literature and education.

Thiele suffered from severe arthritis from 1955 and in his later years left South Australia to settle in warmer conditions near Dayboro, Queensland.

On 4 September 2006, Thiele died from heart failure in a Brisbane hospital, aged 85. He was survived by his wife, Rhonda, two children, seven grandchildren and one great-grandchild. Media coverage of his death was minimal, as he died on the same day as Australian conservationist and media personality Steve Irwin.

== Bibliography ==
Thiele's literary works ranged from the early 20th-century until the very early 21st-century until just prior to his death in September 2006. The primary component of his work was children's literature and educational support for teachers and other authors, primarily educating in the areas of English, drama and Australian history.

== Legacy ==
Can I Call You Colin?, an authorised biography by Stephany Evans Steggall, was published in March 2004.

The Thiele Library at the Magill campus of the University of South Australia was named after him many years before his death.

The Senior Student Library which is shared by Golden Grove High School, Pedare Christian College and Gleeson College is named after and was officially opened by him on 10 May 1989.

The road designated Highway B81 between the start of Highway A32 Main North Road just north of Gawler, and Morgan on the Murray River and passing through Kapunda and Eudunda, is named the Thiele Highway after him.

The Colin Thiele Scholarship for Creative Writing, awarded by Carclew, was named after him.

Trinity College, Gawler named one of their houses on their North campus in his namesake.

== See also ==
- Barossa German
- German Australians

== Awards ==
- 1977 Companion of the Order of Australia
- 1997 Dromkeen Medal
- 2001 Centenary Medal
