= Razzia (artist) =

Gérard Courbouleix–Dénériaz, also known as Razzia, is a French graphic artist born in Montparnasse in 1950.

Razzia is one of the last poster artists to remain in an era dominated by computer-generated images. He began his career in what can be called the golden age of poster art. Razzia is unique in that he still uses the same old style to make his posters. He continues to make posters from an original painting, as opposed to computer graphics.

His work evokes Art Deco. He is best known for his work for Louis Vuitton. A retrospective of his work was published in 2007.
