= Nadia Crow =

American television news reporter

Nadia Crow is an American television news reporter. In June 2013 she began working at KTVX-TV Channel 4 in Salt Lake City, Utah, the first African-American to be a primary anchor in that state.

== Biography ==
Nadia Crow was born in Fort Worth, TX. Her family later moved to Chicago, where she was raised. She attended Syracuse University, graduating from its prestigious S.I. Newhouse School of Public Communications. After graduation she worked for WSJV channel 28 in Elkhart, Indiana, then moved to Cedar Rapids, Iowa, in 2010, where she was a news anchor for KCRG-TV for three years. In 2013, she was hired by Utah's Channel 4 news director George Severson, initially to co-anchor the 4 p.m. newscast, to anchor the 10-minute newscast weeknights on sister station KUCW Channel 30, and to provide field reports. In July 2016, Nadia Crow joined KCPQ, Fox affiliate in Seattle, Washington, as an anchor and reporter.
