= Nadia Plesner =

Danish painter

KISS (Keep It Simple, Stupid), 2013, oil on canvas, 150 x 150 cm.

Nadia Plesner is a Danish painter who works and lives in Copenhagen. Plesner's work explores the disappearing boundaries between the editorial and advertising parts of mass media and often with political undertones. She trained at the Graphic Arts Institute, Copenhagen (Denmark) and at the Gerrit Rietveld Academie, Amsterdam ( the Netherlands).

== Legal action by Louis Vuitton ==
In April 2010 Nadia Plesner was sued by Louis Vuitton for showing her controversial painting Darfurnica. The painting, reproduced in the "Simple Living" T-shirts, depicts an undernourished African child holding a fashionista dog and a designer handbag resembling Louis Vuitton's Monogram Multicolore handbag. In a larger painting featuring the child, he stands in the conflict-ridden region of Darfur in Sudan. The fashion giant issued a cease and desist order for alleged copyright infringement. A Dutch court imposed daily fines of approximately 7,500 US dollars. The trial attracted much international attention and several artists and celebrities supported Nadia Plesner as they believed that the case also referred to artistic expression and the right to make the world aware of international issues in an artistic way. Prior to the trial was also a previous conflict in 2008 between Nadia Plesner and Louis Vuitton, which was about an artistic campaign called Simple Living. In 2011 the Dutch court reversed its decision and acquitted Nadia Plesner. Darfurnica was sold in 2011 for approximately 45,000 US dollars.

== Speeches ==
Beside her paintings Nadia is giving speeches about art, advertising and property rights in international forums.

- 2013: United Nations, Geneve
- 2013: Arken Modern Museum of Art, Denmark
- 2013: Curated By Law, Stuttgart Germany
- 2013: Conference on artistic freedom, Oslo Norway

== Exhibitions ==
- 2013: Gallery Kik, Denmark (solo exhibition)
- 2012: International Art Festival, Denmark (group exhibition)
- 2011: Project 8, Denmark (group exhibition)
- 2011: Emergency Room, Vietnam (group exhibition)
- 2011: Oxcars, Spain (Free Culture Forum)
- 2011: Emergency Room, Poland (group exhibition)
- 2011: Heart Museum, Denmark (exhibition)
- 2011: Intervention, Denmark (solo exhibition)
- 2010: The Christmas Show, Denmark (group exhibition)
- 2009: Artistes de Garde, Denmark (group exhibition)
- 2008: Emergency Room, Italy (group exhibition)
- 2008: Emergency Room, France (group exhibition).

== International awards ==
- 2011: Nominated for the JCI Ten Outstanding Young People´s award.
- 2011: Oxcars award.
- 2008: Cosmopolitan´s Provocateur Of The Year award
