= Nadia Schindelhauer =

German politician (born 1986)

Member of the Landtag of Saarland
- Incumbent
- Assumed office 25 April 2022
- Constituency: Neunkirchen

Personal details
- Born: 1986 (age 39–40)
- Party: Social Democratic Party (since 2009)

Nadia Schindelhauer (born 1986) is a German politician serving as a member of the Landtag of Saarland since 2022. She has served as chairwoman of the Justice, Constitution, Election Review and Data Protection Committee since 2022.
