= Nadia Brown =

American poet, writer, and author

Nadia Janice Brown (born in Queens, New York) is an American poet, writer, and author. She was raised and currently resides in Miami, Florida. Born to Jamaican immigrants, Nadia grew up with five siblings including Kareem Brown. She is also the founder of Author & Book Promotions.

== Unscrambled Eggs ==
Brown never studied writing and learned to first write poetry from reading Psalms from the Bible. She is best known for her poetry collection entitled, Unscrambled Eggs. The book's title was inspired by Joel Osteen, the pastor of the Lakewood Church in Houston, Texas. In 2005, Unscrambled Eggs received the Poetry Book of Merit Award from The American Authors Association.

In 2007, Unscrambled Eggs was awarded Carolyn Howard-Johnson’s Noble Prize for Literature and the Editor's Choice Award for outstanding literary achievement.

Her articles and poetry have been published in national and international poetry journals, magazines and online news publications.
