= Anadia =

Anadia may refer to:

== Places ==
- Anadia, Alagoas, a municipality in the State of Alagoas, Brazil
- Anadia, Portugal, a town and municipality in the district of Aveiro, Portugal

== Other ==
- Anadia (lizard), a genus of lizards
- Anadia FC, a Portuguese Football Club
