= Nadia Yala Kisukidi =

French philosopher, writer and academic (born 1978)

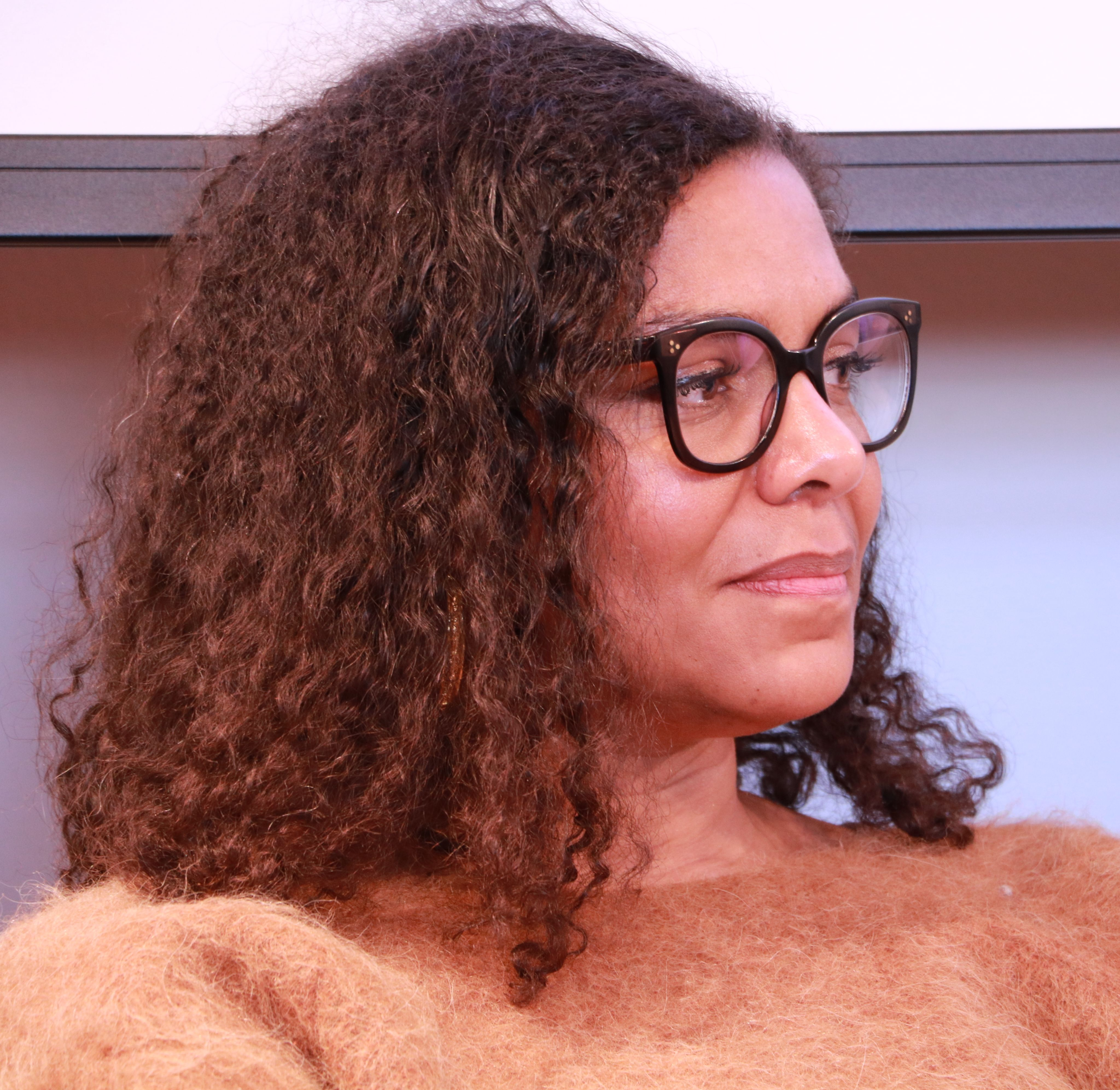

Nadia Yala Kisukidi (born 1978) is a French philosopher, writer and academic, who has re-examined the notion of "blackness" with its colonial implications in France and the rest of Europe. Also interested in contemporary art, she has been selected as one of two curators for the 2020 Yango Biennale in Kinshasa. Kisukidi, who has written widely on French and Africana philosophy, published Bergson ou l'humanité créatrice (Bergson or Creative Humanity) in 2013.

== Biography ==
Born in Brussels on 8 October 1978, Nadia Yala Kisukidi is the daughter of a Congolese father and a Franco-Italian mother. She began studying philosophy at the Charles de Gaulle University in Lille under Fréderic Worms in 1998, earning a Ph.D in 2010 with a thesis titled L’humanité créatrice. Essai sur la signification esthétique et politique de la métaphysique de Bergson.

Since 2011, she has held a number of workshops in various French universities, the University of Geneva and at the Dutch Jan van Eyck Academie in Maastricht. From 2014 to 2016, she was vice-president of the Collège international de philosophie. Her work centres on 20th-century French philosophy, philosophy of religion and African philosophical perspectives, with historical, ethical and political analyses.

In connection with Aimé Césaire's works on "la négritude" (blackness), Kisukidi explains that she likes the way he arrives at the universal by dynamizing the essentialisms and separatisms to build what she refers to as une politique des solidarités (a political agenda of solidarities).

In late 2019, she was invited to write "A Letter to Europe". She concludes it as follows:

Like Susan Sontag, I believe that there are two Europes. The Europe that you embody, in which I live and that fails to fulfill, pushing away its walls, its borders towards Africa. And a second Europe, which is constantly being postponed, only existing on the hypothetical mode of what is yet to come. In between them, what remains: the intimate ferocity of the political fight.
