= Nadia Shahram =

Iranian-American attorney and activist

- Born: Tehran, Iran.
- Education: B.S. in Business Administration (1988); J.D. from the State University of New York at Buffalo (1997)
- Occupations: Attorney-mediator adjunct professor author
- Known for: Iranian–American women's rights advocate
- Awards: "Women of Influence" from Buffalo Business First (2011) "Legal Elite" Award of Western New York (2013)

Nadia Shahram is an Iranian mediation attorney, author, and women's rights advocate. She is the founder and president of the Coalition for the Advancement of Muslim Women (CAMW), an organisation promoting equality for Muslim women. At a CAMW convention, Shahram and the CAMW unveiled the Declaration of Equalities for Muslim Women during the 2014 Convention Days in Seneca Falls, New York. One year later, Shahram presented the Declaration to the Women's Rights National Historical Park in Seneca Falls, where it now hangs on permanent display in the Visitor Centre.

Shahram is a board member of the Family Justice Centre of Erie County, a member of the Women's Bar Association of the State of New York, and a board member of the New York State Council of Divorce Mediation.

== Early life and education ==
Shahram, born in Tehran, Iran, was one of six daughters. Her parents had an extensive library, and as a child she was encouraged to read the classics. Her father was an activist for civil and human rights. He was jailed by the Secret Police (SAVAK) for his outspoken views, and Shahram recalls her father being taken from their home in the middle of the night. Her family left Iran in the late 1970s, and Shahram finished high school in Toronto before moving to Buffalo. Inspired by Barbara Walters, she wanted to become a broadcast journalist but was dissuaded by others due to her heavy accent. She received her B.S. in Business Administration in 1988 and her J.D. in 1997 from the State University of New York at Buffalo. During these years, Shahram married and had two daughters.

== Career ==
Shahram trained as a family mediator at the Rochester Mediation Centre and has been a practicing mediator in the field of Matrimonial Mediation since 2001. She focused her legal practice on matrimonial mediation after observing and studying alternative dispute resolution methods, especially the success of family mediation as practiced in European and Asian countries.

Shahram was an adjunct professor in the Law and Government Program at Hilbert College from 2001 through 2007 and taught as an adjunct professor at the Buffalo State University Law School. She has organized and chaired conferences and symposiums on Divorce Mediation in western New York.

== Awards and recognition ==
Shahram has received the "Women of Influence" award from Buffalo Business First in 2011 and the "Legal Elite" Award of Western New York in 2013. Shahram is the founding member of "Raising Hope", an annual fashion show fund-raiser to benefit the Family Justice Center. During the years 2012 through 2014 this project raised over $100,000 for women victimized by domestic violence in the Western New York area. In 2018, she was selected as one of fourteen Attorneys of the Year in Western New York by The Daily Record for dedication to the legal profession and tireless commitment to the community.

== Activism ==
After the events of September 11, 2001, Shahram re-examined her Islamic faith, the role of Muslims in the international arena, and the perceptions of Islam in the West. She later developed a course at the University of Buffalo Law School, "The Effects of Religion and Culture on Family Laws." Shahram is a critic of women's inequality and misogyny in Muslim culture.

Shahram unveiled the first Declaration of Equalities for Muslim Women on July 19, 2014 during Convention Days in Seneca Falls, New York, the same site where the first Women's Rights Convention was held in 1848. Shahram's Declaration aspires to address laws and cultural practices which are unjust and discriminatory to women in Islamic countries. She continues to promote the Declaration and educate people around the State of New York. She presented the Declaration at the "Declaration of Sentiments: The Remix, A Celebration of the 200th Birthday of Elizabeth Cady Stanton and the Women's Suffrage Centennial" on November 12, 2015, and again at the High Falls Film Festival in High Falls, NY on November 15, 2015.

Warning of potential attacks on Iranian Americans without public support from elected officials, she has urged Americans to openly back Iranians in their fight against tyranny and dictatorship.

== Media ==
While visiting her native country of Iran in 2004 and 2005, Shahram conducted hundreds of interviews and attended Islamic courtrooms as part of a research project. After Shahram returned from her trip she was the focus of a feature article in the Hilbert College quarterly Connections Magazine. Shahram published her first novel Marriage on the Street Corners of Tehran in 2010. This book was based on research and the autobiographical stories of Iranian women with whom she conducted interviews during her time in Iran.

Shahram lectures and gives presentations across New York State and has been interviewed by various media sources for her opinions about family law and Islam.
