= Pedare Christian College =

Location
- Surrey Farm Drive; Golden Grove, South Australia; 34.79511°S 138.69309°E

Information
- Type: Independent, co-educational
- Motto: Let your light shine
- Religious affiliations: Uniting, Anglican
- Established: 1985
- Principal: James Tamblyn
- Enrolment: 1,099 (2023)
- Colours: Blue, red, white & maroon
- Affiliation: Sports Association for Adelaide Schools
- Website: pedarecc.sa.edu.au

Pedare Christian College is an independent, junior, middle and senior school in Golden Grove, South Australia. The junior school comprises reception to year 5, the middle school years 6 to 9, and the senior school years 10 to 12.

This school is a member of the Association of Independent Schools of South Australia, the Anglican Schools Heads Group, the Uniting Church Educational Ministries Commission, the Junior School Heads Association of Australia and the South Australian Christian Schools Association.

The Surrey Farm campus shares facilities with Gleeson College and Golden Grove High School, resulting in an extended curriculum and extra resources. Pedare Christian College is governed by a college board containing members elected from the college community, and representatives from the Anglican and Uniting churches.

== History ==
The name "Pedare" originally came from a vineyard on Ladywood Road, Modbury Heights, owned by Leonard Tolley. It was formed from the names of his sons, Peter, David, and Reginald. The joint campus was originally going to be on this location but it was decided otherwise; this site became The Heights School. That location is now The Heights School.

The founders decided to use the name "Pedare" to recognise the past pioneers. The names of the six communities, or houses, of the school also came from surrounding areas. Eldergreen, from Elder Green Farm, Brooklyn, from Brooklyn Villa Farm, Greenwith, from Greenwith Farm, Surrey, from Surrey Farm, Petworth from Petworth Farm and Hillcott, from Hillcott Farm. The school is governed by a board comprising members from the Uniting and Anglican churches, as well as school staff.

In 1984, Delfin Management Services were developing land in Golden Grove, along with Urban Land Trust. They came up with the idea to make a joint school, and contacted the Pedare foundation planning committee to see if they wanted to join this scheme, saying two of the joint schools would be a Catholic College, and a Government High School. Pedare agreed. Pedare Christian College had its first official school day in 1986. There were 900 students, spread through Years 7 and 8. By 1990 Pedare had enrolments in all Secondary School levels, Years 8 to 12. In 1991 the school board decided to form a Primary school, and located it at nearby Bicentennial Drive.

In 2005, Years 6 and 7 were relocated to the Surrey Farm Campus, forming a middle school. The school conducts an International Baccalaureate program in these years. In 2019, as part of the school's 'One College, Once Campus' policy, the primary school was relocated to the Surrey Farm Campus, making the site an R-12 school.

== Community and Events ==
Since 1991, the school has a house system, with each community named after farms which preceded the urban development of the Golden Grove, Wynn Vale and Greenwith areas.

- Greenwith. Greenwith was the name given to a dairy and wheat farm, as well as vineyards, in northeastern Golden Grove, around modern-day Persimmon Grove. It was founded in 1846 by Thomas Roberts and later passed to the Tilley family who established citrus orchards. The suburb took its name from the farm, which was demolished in November 1990.
- Surrey. Surrey Farm, founded 1853, was a collection of vineyards and almond orchards originally owned by R. Smith, and later owned by the Penfolds and then Wynn family on what is now Surrey Farm Drive (previously Yatala Vale Road). The farmhouse is currently a childcare centre next to Pedare.
- Hillcott. Hillcott Farm, established 1854 and demolished 1998, was a wheat and dairy farm, which later held sheep, horses and pigs. Many orchards surrounded the property. It was situated around the southwest corner of Golden Grove and Yatala Vale Roads.
- Brooklyn. Brooklyn Villa Farm, established in the 1850s, was formerly a dairy, wheat and sheep farm located on the northwest corner of The Golden Way and Golden Grove Road run by the Tilley family. The farm buildings are still standing.
- Eldergreen. Elder Green was a family vineyard adjoining northern Dry Creek, named in 1888 by George Chapman (an employee on Surrey Farm) but operational before then. It was situated on the current site of Park Lake Drive, Wynn Vale, next to the dam. Lemon and orange orchards also surrounded the farmhouses, some of which still standing.
- Petworth. Established in 2024, the house is named after Petworth Farm, a dairy and meat farm established in the 1840s, located in present-day Greenwith. The suburb of Petworth existed until the 1990s development of the area. The farmhouse lies on Gransden Parade, Greenwith.

The following events are regular or semi-regular occasions at the college:

- Swimming Carnival
- Athletics Carnival
- Spring Carnival/Spring Challenge
- Foundation Day (Celebrated Ever 2 Years)
- Cross Country
- Colour Run (one time)

== Notable alumni ==
- Stuart Cochrane (1991–1995) – Australian rules football for the North Melbourne Football Club and Port Adelaide.
- Trent Dumont – Australian rules football for the North Melbourne Football Club.
- Mark Ormrod (1996–2001) – Olympic medallist (2004 Olympics, 4 × 400 metres relay).
- Adam van Dommele – soccer player
- Damien Howson – cyclist

== See also ==
- List of schools in South Australia
