= Golden Grove High School =

Location
- 1 Adey Place; Golden Grove, South Australia, 5125; Australia; 34°47′37″S 138°41′46″E

Information
- Type: Public high school
- Motto: Success for All
- Established: 1989
- Status: Open
- School district: North East
- Educational authority: Department for Education
- Principal: Peter Kuss
- Exam board: South Australian Certificate of Education
- Grades: 7–12
- Enrollment: 1800
- Houses: Tilly, Milne, Stevens and Robertson
- Colors: Green and gold
- Communities served: Golden Grove, Greenwith, Wynn Vale
- Website: goldengrovehs.sa.edu.au

Golden Grove High School is a public secondary school (7–12) located with Gleeson College and Pedare Christian College private schools in Golden Grove, South Australia. The three schools share a common campus. The school was built as part of the Delfin Golden Grove development as part of a planned community. The school opened in 1989. A special education unit is included for students with intellectual and physical disability. It is also a special interest dance/drama school.

== Sporting events ==
Golden Grove High School holds an annual sports day at Tilley Reserve, where all students are encouraged to attend and get involved in numerous sporting events.

Golden Grove is a sporting school that actively participates in the north eastern schools competition, Vista. Vista includes a variety of sports including but not limited to soccer, football, cricket, hockey, basketball, tennis, volleyball, badminton, touch football, swimming, athletics and table tennis.

== Facilities ==
The three schools have a shared facilities area where mainly senior subjects are located. The shared facilities centre includes numerous computer rooms for computer science classes, chemistry, physics, psychology and biology labs, woodwork and metalwork rooms, senior art studios, a music suite and senior home economics building.

The South Australian Government built an adjoining Community Recreation Centre at a cost of approximately 9 million dollars, and was completed in 1993. This centre included two individual stadiums (one with retractable grandstand seating), a gymnasium and a 500-seat performance theatre. Special flooring in the stadiums was made from a special rubber compound, designed to prevent sporting injuries. All three schools and the public share the Recreation and Arts Centre.

The local hockey field is also shared by the three schools.

The Dame Roma Mitchell Centre was built near the Administration Block of the School. This is a specialist arts centre with facilities for drama and dance. This has an upper level, which has a large lecture theatre used for assemblies and lessons for various subjects. This facility is also shared by the three schools.

== Libraries ==
Golden Grove Library is located near the centre of the school. All students use Thiele Library (named after Colin Thiele), which is located in shared facilities.

== Notable alumni ==
- Thomas Strain, footballer for Hednesford Town F.C. playing in the Conference North, on loan from Aston Villa F.C.
- Shane Edwards, AFL premiership player, Richmond FC
- Reece Mastin, English-born Australian singer and songwriter who won the third season of The X Factor Australia in 2011.
- Roberto DeRosa, Sports Journalist and special needs olympic soccer player. One of 60 people worldwide to suffer from a rare bone disability in his hips.
