= Nadia Theodore =

Canadian diplomat

Her Excellency Nadia Theodore
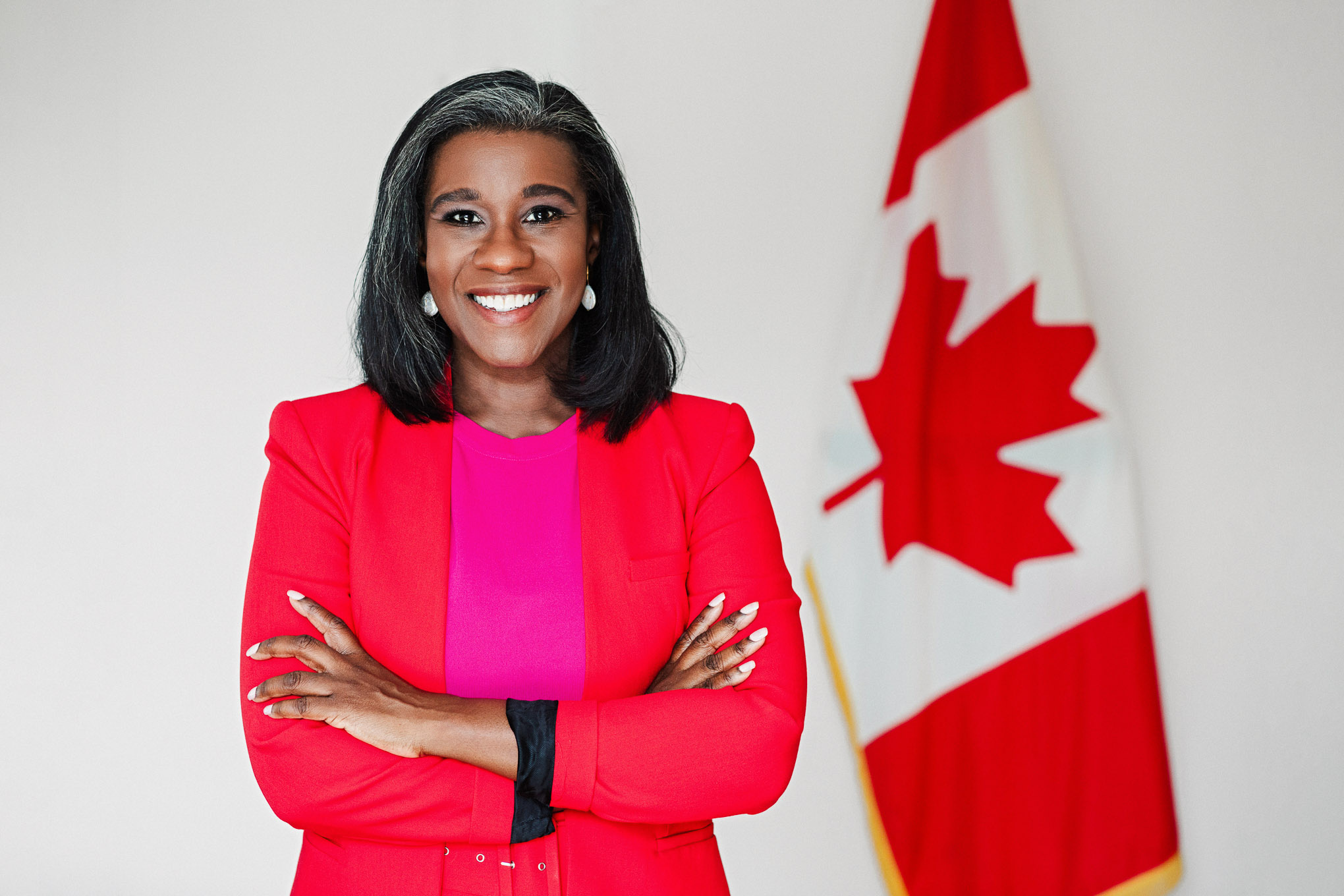

Ambassador and Permanent Representative of Canada to World Trade Organization
- In office August 2022 – 2026
- Prime Minister: Justin Trudeau; Mark Carney
- Preceded by: Stephen de Boer
- Succeeded by: Michelle Cooper

Personal details
- Education: Carleton University (BA); University of London (LLB)

Nadia B. Theodore is a Canadian diplomat who served as the Ambassador and Permanent Representative to the World Trade Organization from 2022 to 2026.

== Life ==
Theodore holds a Bachelors with Honors and Masters in Political Science from Carleton University (2004), and a Bachelor of Laws from the University of London (1999).

In 2000, she began working for the Canadian Civil Service, and in 2004 she joined the Canadian Ministry of Foreign Affairs as a trade negotiator. She then held various senior positions in economic, international and social policy, including at the Canada Revenue Agency and Public Safety Canada. From 2009 to 2012, she worked at the Permanent Mission of Canada to the United Nations in Geneva. She served as the Canadian Consul General in Atlanta from 2017 to 2020. She then became Senior Vice President at Maple Leaf Foods; she was an adjudicator for the Arrell Global Food Innovation Award.
