= Nadia Mapunda =

Australian netball player

Personal information
- Born: 26 October 1988 (age 37)
- Occupation: Chemical engineering student
- Height: 1.79 m (5 ft 10 in)
- School: Gleeson College

Netball career
- Playing positions: GD, GK
Years	Club team	Apps
2006, 2008	Adelaide Thunderbirds	
- Updated on 2009-03-23

Nadia Mapunda (born 26 October 1988) is an Australian netball player. In 2008, she played for the Adelaide Thunderbirds in the ANZ Championship.
