= Nadia Fröbisch =

German vertebrate paleontologist and developmental biologist

Nadia Belinda Fröbisch (née Stöcker) is a German vertebrate paleontologist and developmental biologist who specializes in the evolution and development of amphibians. She is currently a professor at the Museum für Naturkunde Berlin in the Leibniz Institute for Research on Evolution and Biodiversity.

== Academic and professional background ==
Fröbisch obtained her vordiplom (B.Sc. equivalent) at the University of Bonn in Germany (1996-1999), after which she spent a year as a visiting student at the University of Calgary and volunteered at the Royal Tyrell Museum. Following that, she pursued her diploma (M.Sc. equivalent) at the University of Bonn (2000-2003) under the supervision of Martin Sander, where she studied Middle Triassic ichthyosaurs. Fröbisch then went on to pursue her doctoral studies at McGill University (2003-2008) under the supervision of Robert Carroll and Hans Larsson, where she studied the extinct dissorophoid temnospondyls, a close relative of modern amphibians. She went on to hold postdoctoral positions at the University of Toronto Mississauga (supervised by Robert Reisz) and the University of Chicago (supervised by Neil Shubin). She is currently a professor at the Museum für Naturkunde Berlin and is technically affiliated with Humboldt University.

She won the Canadian Paleontology Conference's Bolton Award in 2006, given to the best student presentation, and the Society of Vertebrate Paleontology's Romer Prize in 2006, a prestigious award given for the best student talk based on doctoral research. She appeared in an episode of National Geographic's TV series "Naked Science" and was a Society of Vertebrate Paleontology Distinguished Lecturer from 2018 to 2020; this program was originally an initiative of the Paleontological Society to make accomplished scientists available for public lectures.

== Academic contributions ==
Fröbisch's research focuses primarily on the evolution and development of extinct and extant amphibians through the combined use of paleontological and modern developmental approaches. In particular, she is well known for her work examining patterns of limb development and regeneration. Although her work primarily utilizes amphibian models, with a secondary eye towards lungfish, she has also published on ichthyosaurs, pterosaurs, and chondrichthyans. Her research has been published in leading academic journals, including Nature, JAMA Oncology, Proceedings of the National Academy of Sciences, and Biological Reviews. She also serves on the editorial board of several paleontological journals, including PalZ, the Journal of Paleontology, and Paleobiology.

Fröbisch has contributed to naming several new species of extinct tetrapods, outlined below:

Year	Taxon	Authors
2013	Reiszerpeton renascentis gen. et sp. nov.	Maddin, Fröbisch, Evans, & Milner
2013	Thalattoarchon saurophagis gen. et sp. nov.	Fröbisch, Fröbisch, Sander, Schmitz, & Rieppel
2012	Cacops woehri sp. nov.	Fröbisch & Reisz
2008	Gerobatrachus hottoni gen. et sp. nov.	Anderson, Reisz, Scott, Fröbisch, & Sumida
2008	Paswioops mayi gen. et sp. nov.	Fröbisch & Reisz
2006	Caviramus schesaplanensis gen. et sp. nov.	Fröbisch & Fröbisch
2006	Cymbospondylus nichollsi sp. nov.	Fröbisch & Sander
