= Nadia Boubeghla =

Algerian politician

Nadia Boubeghla (born in Algiers, Algeria) is an Algerian politician. She is a member of the Workers' Party.
