= Nadia Bakhurji =

Saudi architect

- نادية بخرجي
- Born: Saudi Arabia
- Education: King Faisal University (BSc, 1989)
- Occupation: Architect
- Awards: Chevening Fellowship (2006); Arab Women's Excellence Award (2012); International QC100 Gold Quality Crown Award (2014)
- Buildings: Kingdom Hospital (interior), Prince Al Waleed private palace, Kingdom City Compound
- Projects: Jizan Ceremonial Inauguration Exhibition (2005)

Nadia H. Bakhurji is a Saudi architect and businessperson.

== Career and education ==
Bakhurji gained her BSC in Interior Architecture from King Faisal University in 1989. She established the company Riwaq of the Kingdom Est (ROK). In 2007, she founded Nadia Bakhurji Architectural and Interior Design Consultants in Riyadh.

== Women's rights activism ==
Bakhurji has advocated for allowing Saudi women to drive.

She was a founding board member for the Arab International Women's Forum in 2000. She became the first Saudi woman to register as candidate for the Riyadh Local Municipality elections, in 2004, which was subsequently "nullified by Saudi officials" when women's suffrage was banned in Saudi Arabia. In 2009, Nadia challenged the decision of permitting women to participate in the Saudi city council elections of 2009, which women were usually excluded from. As of 2009, six women including Nadia came forward as candidates with the support of striking women's right activist and campaigner, Hatoon al-Fassi.

== Awards and honors ==
Bakhurji's professional contributions to regional architecture and engineering have been recognized through several international and institutional awards. In 2006, she was awarded the prestigious Chevening Fellowship to study in the United Kingdom. Her industry impact was further acknowledged in 2012 when she received an engineering and architecture prize at the 11th Middle East Women Leaders Awards in Dubai.

Her architectural practice, NBA, has also earned distinct professional recognition. In 2014, the firm was presented with the International Quality Crown (QC100) Gold Award in London for maintaining high corporate standards. Additionally, the Federation of Arab Engineers honored her in Bahrain with the Outstanding Arab Women Engineer Award for design excellence.

== Personal life ==
Bakhurji is the eldest of the 7 siblings.
