= Nadia Al-Kokabany =

Yemeni novelist

- Born: Taiz, Yemen
- Education: Sanaa University; Cairo University
- Occupations: Novelist, short story writer, academic
- Writing career
- Notable works: Hubb laysa illà Aqeelat
- Notable awards: Suad al-Sabah Prize; Yemeni President's Award for Young Writers; Arab Fund for Arts and Culture Grant

Nadia Al-Kokabany is a Yemeni novelist, short story writer and academic. Born in Taiz, she studied architecture at Sanaa University and later completed a PhD in architecture at Cairo University in 2008. She subsequently returned to Yemen and took up an academic position at Sanaa University.

== Literary career ==
Al-Kokabany's first published literary work was a short story that appeared in the Yemeni newspaper al-Thawra. Her first collection of short stories, Zaferat Al-Yasmeen (Jasmine Sigh), was published in 2001.
