= Gleeson College =

Location
- Golden Grove, South Australia; Australia
- 34°47′42″S 138°41′47″E

Information
- Motto: With One Heart
- Religious affiliation: Catholic
- Established: 1989
- Principal: Damien Judd
- Grades: 7–12
- Gender: Co-ed
- Enrollment: 922 (2024)
- Campus type: Urban
- Color: Maroon white
- Affiliation: Sports Association for Adelaide Schools
- Website: Official website

Gleeson College is a Catholic secondary school in Golden Grove, South Australia. The college is named after the late Emeritus Archbishop of Adelaide, James William Gleeson and the motto "With one heart" derives from his serving for 10 years (1971–1981) on the Pontifical Council Cor Unum (that is "One Heart").

The campus comprises three secondary schools, Gleeson, Golden Grove High School (State) and Pedare Christian College (Anglican / Uniting Church) linked by a central common resource area. Year 11 and 12 students are able to study at the other schools. This campus was visited by Federal Labor Leader Kevin Rudd immediately after his announcement of the current Labor education policy of creating shared facilities at close-together state, Catholic, and/or independent schools. This policy may have been encouraged by the success of the Golden Grove Secondary Campus. Its current principal is Joe Corbo.

== Campus ==
Located in the Golden Grove area, Gleeson College encompasses a variety of academic buildings that house classrooms, laboratories, libraries, administrative offices, and faculty rooms. These buildings serve as the primary spaces where students attend classes and engage in academic activities. Additionally, the campus has sports facilities, including a gymnasium, soccer pitch, and basketball/netball courts, catering to physical education classes, sports teams, and extracurricular activities.

In 2004, considerable building work took place, enlarging the Thomas Library into the former administrator's office (which was moved to its current location as mentioned above), enlarging the multimedia room (which is now just an ordinary computer room), and adding a room used for lectures and presentations.

It was intended that from the Year 2000, Gleeson would be an 8-12 school that maintained an enrolment close to 650 students. As of 2006, the enrolment number is close to 700 students, a limit imposed by the Catholic Education Office, which limits the size of schools to prevent excessive competition between neighboring Schools.

The college has three computer rooms in the school itself, as well as access to approximately seven rooms in Shared Facilities, and computers in all ordinary classrooms.

The Micah Centre opened in 2020, purpose-designed Senior Learning Centre, a two-story facility, which features eight modern learning areas.

In March of 2026, Gleeson College opened their new St. James Centre, that to replace the chapel as a major meeting area and holy place within the school grounds.

== One Plus Learning ==
The Shared Learning principle allows students to participate in courses that may involve students from all three schools (Gleeson College, Pedare College, and Golden Grove High). These courses are categorized as either 'Shared Learning VET' or 'Shared Learning SACE.' The courses are hosted by the most suitable teacher from the campus.

One+ also offers additional shared facilities and resources, including an Electronics Trade Training Centre, Science Labs, Design and Technology Centre, Music suite for recording and production, ICT and Multimedia Studios, Commercial training kitchen and dining room, Visual Arts Studio, three gyms, and a Performing Arts theatre.

== Motto ==
The motto of Gleeson College is Cor Unum, which is Latin for "With One Heart".

== House system ==
House	Motto
Damiani	Motto "Belong" reflects a sense of community and unity within Damiani House, while "Inspire" represents the inspiration drawn from Jesus Christ in all aspects of learning and growth.
Fyfe	"Fearless in Faith" encourages strength, courage, and fearlessness in spreading the Good News of Jesus Christ in today's secular world.
Hughes	"With Justice we Serve" challenges us to strive for justice and serve others with unwavering courage.
McDonald	Truth, Courage, and Unity guide McDonald House, encouraging the pursuit of truth, the development of leadership qualities, and a sense of unity and support among its members.

== Curriculum ==
The curriculum at Gleeson Colleges includes religious education, music, dance, drama, and visual arts, English, humanities and social sciences, mathematics, science, and technologies.

== World Football Program ==
The World Football Specialist Program offers an opportunity for students who are interested in playing World Football. The program caters to both boys and girls.

== Links to schools in Japan ==
Gleeson College has hosted numerous long-term study exchanges for Japanese students from Kyoto Bunkyo High School, Kogakuin Junior High School, and Osaka Seiko High School. During their visits, these student groups engage in intensive English classes, along with regular academic subjects.

== Notable alumni ==
- Carla Dziwoki (2000), Queensland Firebirds netball player
- Nadia Mapunda (2006), Adelaide Thunderbirds netball player
- Matthew Mullen (2006), Adelaide City football player
- Ryan McGowan (2007), Dundee United football player
- Daniel Mullen (2007), Newcastle United Jets football player
- Craig Goodwin (2009), Adelaide United football player
- Bradden Inman (2009), Crewe Alexandra football player
- Dylan McGowan (2009), Adelaide United football player
- Sean Roberts (2010), 2014 Commonwealth Games Representative Athletics 100m Sprint
- Jordan Elsey (2010), Adelaide United football player
- Jack Graham (2014), Richmond Football Club Australian rules football player
- Tahlia Borg (2020), Teenage Joans lead vocalist and drummer
