= Nadia Ali (actress) =

Pakistani-American pornographic film actress

- Born: Onaza Malik; 1990 or 1991 (age 35–36)
- Other name: Onai Malik
- Occupations: Pornographic film actress; cosmetologist
- Years active: 2015–2024

Onai Malik (born Onaza Malik in 1990 or 1991), known professionally as Nadia Ali, is a former pornographic film actress who worked in the adult film industry from 2015 to 2016.

== Early life ==
Nadia Ali was raised in New Jersey. She was born as Onaza Malik but now uses the name Onai Malik. Malik speaks Hindi, Urdu and Pahadi. She was raised as a Muslim, but Ali was not religious herself. In a 2016 interview with Refinery29, Malik stated that she still identified as a practicing Muslim, adding that she had struggled with the apparent contradictions between her work and religion.

== Career ==
=== Pornographic career ===
In 2013, 21-year-old Malik was working as an eyebrow threader in San Francisco when a friend recommended that she accompany her as a stripper; she made $500 that night and worked as a dancer and escort in 2014.

She was encouraged to wear a hijab in pornography due to sexual taboo and to increase her opportunities. One of her films, titled Women of the Middle East, involves a domestic violence scene followed by a sex scene, when the man becomes aroused. Its advertising blurb reads: "They may look suppressed, but given an opportunity to express themselves freely, their wild, untamable natural sexuality is released." She blames culture, rather than religion, for patriarchy in Pakistan and has said she wanted to make solo and lesbian scenes to "show the world that Middle Eastern girls of Pakistani descent really do get horny." She has said that she has been "banned" from Pakistan for performing in pornography in a hijab, and also has received online death threats for performing.

In 2016, she left the pornographic industry after making twenty scenes, when her mother discovered she was doing porn and became depressed. She also stated that she found the idea of her 21st film, of a man resembling Donald Trump having sex with a Muslim woman, to be degrading. Her bookings to perform in Florida after the 2016 Pulse Orlando shooting were canceled for fear of backlash.

=== Other ventures ===
In 2018, she opened a beauty bar, Onai Here 2 Slay, in Los Angeles.
