= Nadine (given name) =

Name list

Nadine or Nadeen
- Pronunciation: /neɪˈdiːn/; /nəˈdiːn/
- Gender: Female

Origin
- Origin: French, Russia
- Meaning: Showerer of blessings, Hope

Other names
- Related names: Nadezhda, Nadia, Nadège

Nadine (with the variant spellings: Nadeen, Nadene) is a female given name. It is a French elaboration (feminine diminutive; cf. Clémentine, Géraldine, Micheline) of the name Nadia (also spelled Nadja, Nadya; Russian: Надя, romanized: Nádja, lit. 'Nadya'), itself being a pet form of the Ukrainian virtue name Nadia (Russian: Надя, romanized: Nadia, lit. 'Hope'; from Ukrainian: надія, romanized: nadia, lit. 'hope'). It is also commonly used amongst Arabic communities and may mean in Arabic: نادين, romanized: nādīn, lit. 'Admonitory/Messenger, Showerer of blessings'.

== People with this name ==
- Nádine (born 1982), South African singer
- Nadine Aeberhard (born 2002), Swiss BMX rider
- Nadine Agyemang-Heard (born 2002), Italian rower
- Nadine Akkerman, Dutch historian and literary scholar
- Nadine Al Rassi (born 1979), Lebanese actress
- Nadine Alari (1927–2016), French actress
- Nadine Ames (born 1991), Indonesian beauty pageant titleholder who won Puteri Indonesia 2010
- Nadine Angerer (born 1978), German football player
- Nadine Anstatt (born 1995), German footballer
- Nadine Apetz (born 1986), German boxer
- Nadine Ashraf (born 1993), Egyptian badminton player
- Nadine Aubry, American engineer
- Nadine Audin (born 1958), French gymnast
- Nadine Auzeil (born 1964), French javelin thrower
- Nadeen Ayoub (born 1998), Palestinian model and beauty pageant titleholder
- Nadine Backes (born 1985), German politician
- Nadine G. Barlow (1958–2020), American astronomer
- Nadine Basile (1931–2017), French actress
- Nadine Baudot-Trajtenberg (born 1956), Israeli economist
- Nadine Baylis (1940–2017), British stage and costume designer
- Nadine Beckel (born 1977), German shot putter
- Nadine Beiler (born 1990), Austrian singer
- Nadine Benjamin, British opera singer
- Nadine Bezuk, American mathematics educator
- Nadine Bismuth (born 1975), Canadian writer
- Nadine Blacklock (1953–1998), American nature photographer
- Nadine Brandl (born 1990), Austrian synchronized swimmer
- Nadine Broersen (born 1990), Dutch heptathlete
- Nadine Bryan (born 1976), Jamaican international netball player
- Nadine Burke Harris (born 1975), pediatrician and first Surgeon General of California
- Nadine Byarugaba, Ugandan banker and management consultant
- Nadine Capellmann (born 1965), German equestrian
- Nadine Caron, Canadian surgeon
- Nadine Caster (born 1965), French long jumper
- Nadine-Josette Chaline, French historian
- Nadine Chandrawinata (born 1984), Indonesian beauty pageant titleholder who won Puteri Indonesia 2005
- Nadine Chanz (born 1972), German Playboy model and actress
- Nadine Conner (1914–2003), American soprano
- Nadine Jolie Courtney (born 1980), American novelist and reality TV personality
- Nadine Coyle (born 1985), singer in the all-girl group Girls Aloud
- Nadine Crocker (born 1988), American actress and filmmaker
- Nadine Debois (born 1961), French middle-distance runner and sprinter
- Nadine Delache (born 1941), French swimmer
- Nadine M. DeLawrence (1953–1992), African-American installation artist and sculptor
- Nadine Deleury, French cellist
- Nadine Denize (born 1943), French mezzo-soprano
- Nadine Dorries (born 1957), British politician
- Nadine El-Enany, English legal scholar
- Nadine Ellis, American actress
- Nadine Epstein, American journalist
- Nadine Ernsting-Krienke (born 1974), German field hockey player
- Nadine Fähndrich (born 1995), Swiss cross-country skier
- Nadine Faustin-Parker (born 1976), Haitian hurdler
- Nadine Fest (born 1998), Austrian alpine skier
- Nadine Fiers (born 1966), Belgian cyclist
- Nadine Fourcade (1963–2011), French long jumper
- Nadine Garner (born 1970), Australian actress
- Nadine Gasman, Mexican feminist and advocate against sexual violence
- Nadine George (born 1968), West Indian cricketer
- Nadine George-Graves, professor of Theater and Dance at the University of San Diego, California
- Nadine Gersberg (born 1977), German politician
- Nadine Gill (born 1991), German cyclist
- Nadine Girault (1959–2023), Canadian politician
- Nadine Gobet (born 1969), Swiss politician
- Nadine Gogolla, German neuroscientist
- Nadine Gonska (born 1990), German sprinter
- Nadine Gordimer (1923–2014), Nobel and Booker Prize–winning South African novelist
- Nadine Gosselin (born 1977), Canadian figure skater
- Nadine Hani, Lebanese news presenter
- Nadine Hansen, American lawyer
- Nadine Hanssen, Dutch footballer
- Nadine Härdter (born 1981), German handball player
- Nadine Hentschke (born 1982), German hurdler
- Nadine Heredia (born 1976), politician and First Lady of Peru
- Nadine Heselhaus, German politician
- Nadine Hildebrand (born 1987), German athlete
- Nadine Hoffman, baseball player
- Nadine Hofstetter, Swiss ice hockey player
- Nadine Horchler (born 1986), German biathlete
- Nadine Hwang, Chinese lawyer and pilot
- Nadine Ibrahim, Nigerian film director
- Nadine Ijewere, British photographer
- Nadine Isaacs (1942–2004), Jamaican architect
- Nadine Ivanitzky, Ukrainian sociologist and cultural anthropologist
- Nadine Jarosch (born 1995), German artistic gymnast
- Nadine Jeppesen (1914–1996), American publisher
- Nadine Joachim (born 1975), German karateka
- Nadine Juillard, French footballer
- Nadine Julitz (born 1990), German politician
- Nadine Kariya, American jewelry artist
- Nadine Kaslow, American psychologist
- Nadeen L. Kaufman (born 1945), American psychologist
- Nadine Keßler (born 1988), German footballer
- Nadine Khoury, Syrian actress
- Nadine Khouzam (born 1990), Belgian field hockey player
- Nadine Kirschon (born 1984), Swedish actress
- Nadine Kleinert (born 1975), German shot put athlete
- Nadine de Klerk (born 2000), South African cricketer
- Nadine Koppehel, German politician
- Nadine Koutcher (born 1983), Belarusian opera singer
- Nadine Kraus (born 1988), German footballer
- Nadine Krause (born 1982), German handball player
- Nadine Labaki (born 1974), Lebanese actress and director
- Nadine Lambert (1926–2006), American psychology and education professor
- Nadine Laporte, American academic
- Nadine Laurent, French Paralympic alpine skier
- Nadine Le Gal, Quebec politician
- Nadine Lechon (born 1963), French politician
- Nadine Lehmann (born 1990), Swiss curler
- Nadine Leopold (born 1994), Austrian model
- Nadine Lewington (born 1980), British actress
- Nadine Lockwood (1991–1996), child from Washington Heights, New York, murdered by her mother
- Nadine Lüchinger, Swiss film producer
- Nadine Lustre (born 1993), Filipina actress
- Nadine Macaluso (born 1967), American psychologist
- Nadine Magloire (1932–2021), Haitian-Canadian writer
- Nadine Marsh-Edwards, British film producer
- Nadine Marshall (born 1972), English actress
- Nadine Masshardt (born 1984), Swiss politician
- Nadine McInnis, Canadian author
- Nadine Messerschmidt (born 1993), German sport shooter
- Nadine Meyer, American poet
- Nadine Mills, British actress
- Nadine Mohamed (basketball) (born 1998), Egyptian basketball player
- Nadine Moodley (born 1990), South African cricketer
- Nadine Morano (born 1963), French politician
- Nadine Moussa, Lebanese lawyer and political activist
- Nadine Mulkerrin (born 1993), English actress
- Nadine Müller, several people
- Nadine Muzerall (born 1978), Canadian ice hockey player and coach
- Nadine Nakamura, American politician
- Nadine Joy Nathan (born 1999), Singaporean artistic gymnast
- Nadine Netter (born 1944), American tennis player
- Nadine Neumann (born 1975), Australian swimmer
- Nadine Nicole (born 1983), American actress
- Nadine Njeim, several people
- Nadine Nyadjo (born 1985), Cameroonian volleyball player
- Nadine Opgen-Rhein (born 1976), German canoeist
- Nadine Orenstein (born 1961), American art historian and curator
- Nadine Pequeneza, Canadian documentary film director and producer
- Nadine Poss (born 1991), German wine queen
- Nadine Prévost (born 1951), French hurdler
- Nadine Prohaska (born 1990), Austrian footballer
- Nadine Provençal, Canadian researcher
- Nadine Ramaroson (1958–2011), French-born politician in Madagascar
- Nadine B. Ramsey, American aviator
- Nadine Renaux (1912–2005), French soprano
- Nadine Renee (1972–2004), American musician
- Nadine Ribault (1964–2021), French writer
- Nadine Riesen (born 2000), Swiss footballer
- Nadine Roberts (born 1994), Australian beauty pageant titleholder
- Nadine Rohr, Swiss pole vaulter
- Nadine Rolland (born 1975), Canadian swimmer
- Princess Nadine Romanovskya (1908–2000), British aristocrat and heiress
- Nadine Roos (born 1996), South African rugby union and sevens player
- Nadine de Rothschild (born 1932), French writer and actor
- Nadine Ruf (born 1978), German politician
- Nadine Salameh (born 1979), Syrian/Palestinian actress
- Nadine Samonte (born 1988), German-Filipina actress
- Nadine Schiff, Canadian film producer, screenwriter, author
- Nadine Schmutzler (born 1984), German rower
- Nadine Schön (born 1983), German politician
- Nadine Schtakleff (born 1985), Lebanese footballer
- Nadine Scotland (born 1990), Canadian curler
- Nadine Secunde (born 1953), American operatic soprano
- Nadine Shah (born 1986), British singer-songwriter
- Nadine Shahin (born 1997), Egyptian squash player
- Nadine Shamir (1972–2004), American singer-songwriter
- Nadine Sierra (born 1988), American music performer
- Nadine Barrie Smith, American biomedical researcher
- Nadine Smith (born 1965), American LGBTQ+ rights activist
- Nadine Spencer (born 1967), Canadian businesswoman
- Nadine Stanton (born 1975), New Zealand sport shooter
- Nadine Strossen (born 1950), president of the American Civil Liberties Union
- Nadine Sutherland (born 1968), Jamaican musician
- Nadine Szöllősi-Schatzl (born 1993), Hungarian handball player
- Nadine Taub (1943–2020), American lawyer and professor
- Nadine Thomas (born 1952), American politician
- Nadine Ann Thomas (born 1986), Malaysian actress, model and DJ
- Nadine Trintignant (born 1934), French filmmaker and author
- Nadine Truong, American film director
- Nadine Unger, atmospheric chemistry researcher
- Nadine Ungerank (born 1996), Austrian sport shooter
- Nadine Velazquez (born 1978), American actress and model
- Nadine van der Velde (born 1962), Canadian actress
- Nadine Visser (born 1995), Dutch heptathlete
- Nadine Voindrouh (born 1977), Romanian singer, actress and television presenter
- Nadine Roberts Waters (1892–1985), American singer
- Nadine Weratschnig (born 1998), Austrian canoeist
- Nadine White (born 1992), British journalist
- Nadine Wilson, Canadian politician
- Nadine Winter (1924–2011), American politician
- Nadine Woodward (born 1962), American politician
- Nadine Wulffius, Australian ballet dancer
- Nadine Zumkehr (born 1985), Swiss beach volleyball player

== Fictional characters ==
- Nadine, a fictional character played by Marion Cotillard in the 2006 film Dikkenek
- Marina Nadine Cooper, fictional character on the CBS soap opera Guiding Light
- Nadine Cross, fictional character in Stephen King's novel The Stand
- Nadine Boynton, a fictional character in Agatha Christie's novel Appointment with Death
- Nadine Hurley, fictional character on the television series Twin Peaks
- Nadine Flumberghast, a fictional character in Arthur
- Nadine, a fictional character in the TV series Hey Arnold!
- Nadine Ross, a fictional character played by Laura Bailey in the 2016 Naughty Dog video game Uncharted 4: A Thief's End
- Nadine Hudson-Thomas, a fictional character played by Anne-Marie Johnson on the TV series What's Happening Now!!
- Nadine Tolliver, a fictional character played by Bebe Neuwirth on the CBS TV Series Madam Secretary
- Nadine, a fictional character played by Hailee Steinfeld in the 2016 film The Edge of Seventeen
- Nadine Foster, a main character in Jacqueline Wilson's Girls Series and its CITV adaptation, where she is played by Amy Kwolek.
- Nadine, a member of Caramella Girls

== See also ==
- Nadine (disambiguation)
- Nadia (disambiguation)
- Nadezhda (disambiguation)
