= Hani (name) =

Hany (also Hani; Arabic: هانئ hānī' "carefree" and "happy" or in Hawaiian "To move lightly; to touch" ) is a masculine Arabic given name, a unisex Hawaiian given name, a Hungarian (a diminutive of Ann), Malay and Indonesian unisex given name. It is also a surname. Notable people with the name include:

== Given name ==
=== Hani ===
- Hani (producer), Kuwaiti-American record producer
- Hani (singer) (born 1992), Korean singer and actress
- Hani Abbadi (died 2014), Jordanian politician
- Hani Alnakhli (born 1986), Saudi athlete
- Hani Amamou (born 1997), Tunisian footballer
- Hani Awijan (1977–2006), Palestinian Islamic militant
- Hani Azer (born 1949), Egyptian-German civil engineer
- Hani Ballan (born 1967), Qatari chief executive
- Hani Qadri Demian, Egyptian civil servant
- Hani Al-Dhabit (born 1979), Omani footballer
- Hani Al-Dhahi (born 1985), Saudi footballer
- Hani Sarie-Eldin (born 1966), Egyptian lawyer and writer
- Hani Elteir (born 1981), Egyptian swimmer
- Hani Fadzil (born 1991), Malaysian radio presenter and host
- Hani Furstenberg (born 1979), Israeli-American actress and singer
- Hani Gabra (born 1963), British oncologist
- Hani Hagras, British computer scientist
- Hani Hanjour (1972–2001), 9/11 terrorist and hijacker/pilot of American Airlines Flight 77
- Hani al-Hassan (1938–2012), German-Palestinian politician
- Hani Hayajneh (born 1965), Jordanian academic
- Hani al-Hayek (born 1953), Palestinian politician
- Hani al-Hindi (1927–2016), Syrian politician and activist
- Hani Abdulaziz Al Hussein, Kuwaiti engineer and politician
- Hani Khasawneh (born 1939), Jordanian politician
- Hani Kobeissy, Lebanese politician
- Hani Mahmassani (1956–2025), Lebanese-American engineer and transport scientist
- Hani Al-Masdar (1981–2024), Palestinian athlete and coach
- Hani Miletski (born 1962), American sexologist
- Hani Mitwasi (born 1983), Palestinian-Jordanian singer
- Hani Mohsin (1965–2006), Malaysian actor, host and producer
- Hani Motoko (1873–1957), Japanese journalist
- Hani Al Moulia, Syrian-Canadian photographer
- Hani Mulki (born 1951), Jordanian politician
- Hani Naboulse (born 1994), Palestinian footballer
- Hani Al-Nahedh (born 1987), Saudi footballer
- Hani Naqshabandi (1963–2023), Saudi journalist, writer, and novelist
- Hani Naser (1950–2020), Jordanian-American musician
- Hani Nasira, Egyptian author and journalist
- Hani Al-Owaidh (born 1979), Saudi footballer
- Hani Talab al-Qawasmi, Palestinian politician
- Hani al-Rahib (1939–2000), Syrian novelist and literary academic
- Hani Ramadan (born 1959), Egyptian-Swiss Imam
- Hani Rashid (born 1958), Egyptian-Canadian architect and educator
- Hani Al-Sabti (born 1993), Omani footballer
- Hani Al-Saqer (born 1973), Kuwaiti footballer
- Hani al-Sayegh, Saudi prisoner
- Hani Al-Sebyani (born 1998), Saudi footballer
- Hani Sewilam, Egyptian academic and professor
- Hani Shennib, Libyan-American medical professor, global healthcare consultant, and activist
- Hani Shukrallah (1950–2019), Egyptian journalist and political analyst
- Hani al-Sibai (born 1961), Egyptian Sunni scholar
- Hani Bahjat Tabbara (born 1939), Jordanian diplomat
- Hani Al Taiar (born 1990), Syrian footballer
- Hani Abd Latif Tilfah (born 1962), Iraqi security official
- Hani ibn Urwa (died 680), Kufan leader
- Hani Watson (born 1982), Australian para powerlifter
- Hani Zurob (born 1976), Palestinian-French painter

=== Hany ===
- Hany Abdelhady (born 1980), Egyptian Paralympic powerlifter
- Hany Adel (born 1976), Egyptian guitarist, vocalist, and screen actor
- Hany El Agazy (born 1985), Egyptian footballer
- Hany Armanious (born 1962), Egyptian-Australian artist
- Hany Abu-Assad (born 1961), Palestinian filmmaker
- Hany Atiyo (born 1983), Egyptian boxer
- Hany Abdel-Aziz (born 1946), Egyptian diplomat
- Hany Abdel Gawad El-Banna (born 1950), Egyptian-British philanthropist
- Hany Eitouni, American entrepreneur
- Hany Elbehiry, Egyptian paralympic athlete
- Hany El-Fakharany (born 1978), Egyptian handball player
- Hany Farid (born 1966), American computer scientist
- Hany Mahfouz Helal, Egyptian academic
- Hany Mahmoud, Egyptian engineer
- Hany Mouselhy (born 1968), Egyptian volleyball player
- Hany Moussa (born 1966), Egyptian basketball player
- Hany Mukhtar (born 1995), German footballer
- Hany Ouichou, Canadian film producer
- Hany Ramzy (born 1969), Egyptian football player and coach
- Hany Ramzy (actor) (born 1964), Egyptian actor and comedian
- Hany Rashwan (born 1990), Egyptian businessman, entrepreneur, and computer engineer
- Hany Abo Rida (born 1953), Egyptian FIFA official
- Hany Said, multiple people
- Hany M. Sala'am, Lebanese businessman
- Hany Salam, Egyptian philatelist
- Hany Shaker (1952–2026), Egyptian singer, actor and composer
- Hany Soh (born 1987), Singaporean politician and lawyer

== Surname ==
- Chris Hani (1942–1993), assassinated South African politician
- Don Hany (born 1975), Australian actor
- Jean Hani (1917–2012), French philosopher
- Nadine Hani (born 1973), Lebanese television presenter
