= Nadya =

Nadya is a feminine given name, sometimes a short form (hypocorism) of Nadezhda or other names.

Nadya is used predominantly throughout the Mediterranean region, Eastern Europe, Latin America, the Caucasus, and the Arab world. It has also seen some popularity in Quebec, France and Ireland. Its origins are in the Slavic and Ancient Greek languages. Variations include: Nadja, Nadia, Nadine, Nadiya, and Nadiia.

The name Nadya (or Nadia) means "hope" in many Slavic languages, e.g. Ukrainian Nadiya (Надія, accent on the i), Belarusian Nadzeya (Надзея, accent on the e), and Old Polish Nadzieja, all of which are derived from Old East Slavic. In Bulgarian and Russian, on the other hand, Nadia or Nadya (Надя, accent on first syllable) is the diminutive form of the full name Nadyezhda (Надежда), meaning "hope" and derived from Old Church Slavonic, which it entered as a translation of the Greek word ελπίς (Elpis), with the same meaning.

The name's early roots and origins are to be found in Ancient Greek mythology. In most other languages, it is a name in its own right.

In Arabic, Nadiyyah means "tender" and "delicate".

== People ==
- Nadya A.R. (born 1971), Pakistani author
- Nadezhda Nadya Dorofeeva (born 1990), Ukrainian pop singer and fashion designer
- Nadya A. Fouad, American vocational psychologist
- Nadya Ginsburg, American actress
- Nadya Hazboun (born 1983/1984), Palestinian-Czech jewelry and fashion designer
- Nadya Hutagalung (born 1974), Indonesian-Australian model, actress and presenter
- Nadya Khamitskaya (born 1982), Belarusian-born Norwegian dancer
- Nadezhda Krupskaya (1869–1939), Russian Bolshevik revolutionary and politician, wife of Vladimir Lenin
- Nadya Kwandibens, Canadian artist
- Nadya Larouche (born 1956), Canadian writer of children's books and theatre plays
- Nadya Mason, American physicist and former gymnast
- Nadya Melati, Indonesian badminton player
- Nadya Ochner (born 1993), Italian snowboarder
- Nadya Okamoto (born 1998), American social entrepreneur
- Nadya Ortiz (born 1986), Colombian chess grandmaster
- Nadya Romeo (born 1971), Australian wheelchair basketball player
- Nadya Rusheva (1952–1969), Russian painter and illustrator
- Nadya Shatarova (born 1960), Bulgarian gymnast
- Nadya Suleman (born 1975), American single mother nicknamed "Octomom"
- Nadezhda Tolokonnikova (born 1989), Russian artist, political activist and prisoner of conscience
- Nadya Toncheva (born 2005), Bulgarian chess player
- Nadya Zhexembayeva, a Kazakh author

== Fictional Characters ==
- Nadya, the prison guard in Muppets Most Wanted.
- Nadya King, character in the book series Sali Sali Saluki.

== See also ==
- Nadia (given name)
- Nadja (disambiguation)
