= Nadin =

Nadin is a surname and a given name. It may refer to:

== Surname ==
- Bob Nadin (born 1933), Canadian ice hockey referee
- Joanna Nadin, English writer, Labour Party policy writer and special adviser to Tony Blair
- Mihai Nadin (born 1938), Romanian computer scientist
- Peter Nadin (born 1954), British-born American artist and poet
- Simon Nadin (born 1965), British rock climber and professional photographer

== Given name ==
- Nadin Dawani (born 1988), Jordanian taekwondo practitioner
- Nadin Ercegović (born 1973), Yugoslav and Croatian former tennis player
- Nadín Ospina (born 1960), Colombian artist

== See also ==
- Nadine (disambiguation)
- Nadeen
- Nadene
- Nadeem
- Nadim
