= Nadejda =

Nadejda is a feminine given name, a transliteration variant of the Slavic name Надежда, Nadezhda. Notable people with the name include:

- Nadejda de Bragança or Prince Miguel, Duke of Viseu (1878–1923), member of the exiled branch of the House of Braganza
- Nadejda Brânzan (1948–2020), infectious diseases physician from the Republic of Moldova
- Nadejda of Bulgaria (1899–1958), member of the Bulgarian royal family
- Nadejda Colesnicenco (born 1996), Moldovan footballer
- Nadejda Galli-Shohat or Nadiashda Galli-Shohat (1879–1948), Russian and American physicist
- Nadejda Grinfeld (1887–?) was a Bessarabian politician
- Nadejda Mountbatten, Marchioness of Milford Haven (1917–1963), member of the Russian imperial family who became a British subject
- Nadejda Palovandova (born 1975), Moldovan archer
- Nadejda Popov (born 1994), Canadian rugby sevens player
- Princess Nadejda Petrovna of Russia (1898–1988), the third child of Grand Duke Peter Nikolaevich of Russia and his wife
- Nadejda Stancioff (1894–1957), Bulgarian diplomat and translator; the first woman to officially represent Bulgaria in the diplomatic field
- Nadejda Waloff FRES (1909–2001), Russian-born English entomologist
