= Nadège =

Nadège is a French feminine given name.

== List of people with the given name ==
- Nadège Lacroix (born 1986), Swiss actress, television personality.
- Nadège August, American actress, producer, and podcast host
- Nadège Vanhee-Cybulski, French fashion designer
- Nadège du Bospertus, French model
- Nadège Koffi (born 1989), Ivorian former footballer
- Nadège Bobillier (born 1988), French skater
- Nadège Douroux (born 1981), French yacht racer
- Nadège Beausson-Diagne (born 1972), French actress, singer and columnist
- Nadege Uwamwezi (born 1993), Rwandan actress
- Nadège Cliton (born 1978), French former medley swimmer
- Nadège Cissé (born 1997), Ivorian professional footballer
- Nadège Abomangoli (born 1975), Congo-born French politician
- Nadege Essoh (born 1990), Ivorian professional footballer
- Nadège Noële Ango-Obiang (born 1973), Gabonese writer

== See also ==
- Nadezhda (disambiguation)
- Nadia (Nadiia, Nadiya, Nadja, Nadya)
- Nadine (given name)
- Nadine (disambiguation)
