= Nadezhda =

Nadezhda may refer to:

- Nadezhda (given name), people with the given name Nadezhda
- Nadezhda (satellite), a series of Russian navigation satellites, of which one was launched in 1998
- 2071 Nadezhda, an asteroid
- Nadezhda (cockroach), a cockroach that conceived offspring aboard the Foton-M 3 biosatellite mission in 2007
- Lada Nadezhda, a minivan produced by AvtoVAZ
- Nadezhda, a bandy club in Birobidzhan, Russia

== Places ==
- Nadezhda, Sofia, a municipality, part of Sofia, Bulgaria
- Nadezhda Strait, Okhotsk Sea
- Nadezhda Island, Sitka County, Alaska

== Ships ==
- Nadezhda (1802 Russian ship), a Russian sloop
- Nadezhda (1992 tall ship), a Russian sail training ship, sister of STS Mir
- Bulgarian torpedo gunboat Nadezhda

== Music ==
- Nadezhda (song), a 1971 Soviet song

== See also ==
- Nadège
- Nadezhdinsky (disambiguation)
