= EFSA (disambiguation) =

EFSA is an acronym for:

- Egypt Financial Supervisory Authority
- European Food Safety Authority
- Estonian Financial Supervisory Authority

EFSA is also the ICAO code for Savonlinna Airport.
