= James Alexander Shohat =

Russian and American mathematician (1886-1944)

James Alexander Shohat (a.k.a. Jacques Chokhate (or Chokhatte) Russian: Яков Александрович Шохат, 18 November 1886, Brest-Litovsk – 8 October 1944, Philadelphia) was a Russian and American mathematician at the University of Pennsylvania who worked on the moment problem. He studied at the University of Petrograd and married the physicist Nadiascha W. Galli, the couple emigrating from Russia to the United States in 1923.

He was an Invited Speaker of the ICM in 1924 at Toronto.

== Selected works ==
- Shohat, J. (1927). "On a general formula in the theory of Tchebycheff polynomials and its applications". Trans. Amer. Math. Soc. 29 (3): 569–583. doi:10.1090/s0002-9947-1927-1501405-8. MR 1501405.
- Shohat, J. A. (1927). "A simple method for normalizing Tchebycheff polynomials and evaluating the elements of the allied continued fractions". Bull. Amer. Math. Soc. 33 (4): 427–432. doi:10.1090/s0002-9904-1927-04396-8. MR 1561395.
- with J. Sherman: Shohat, J.; Sherman, J. (1932). "On the numerators of the continued fraction". Proc Natl Acad Sci U S A. 18 (3): 283–287. doi:10.1073/pnas.18.3.283. PMC 1076208. PMID 16587678.
- "On the development of functions in a series of polynomials". Bull. Amer. Math. Soc. 41 (2): 49–82. 1935. doi:10.1090/s0002-9904-1935-06007-0. MR 1563024.
- Shohat, J. (1937). "Mechanical quadratures, in particular, with positive coefficients". Trans. Amer. Math. Soc. 42 (3): 461–496. doi:10.1090/s0002-9947-1937-1501930-6. MR 1501930.
- Shohat, J. (1939). "A differential equation for orthogonal polynomials". Duke Math. J. 5 (2): 401–417. doi:10.1215/s0012-7094-39-00534-x. MR 1546133.
- with J. D. Tamarkin: The problem of moments. Mathematical Surveys, vol. 1. New York: AMS. 1943. OCLC 622772715.
- "On van der Pol's and non-linear differential equations". J. Appl. Phys. 15 (7): 568–574. 1944. doi:10.1063/1.1707470.

== See also ==
- Shohat expansion
- Shohat–Favard theorem
