= Nadia (disambiguation) =

Nadia is a feminine given name.

Nadia may also refer to:

- Nadia district, West Bengal, India
- Toyota Nadia, a compact minivan
- Nadia (film), an unauthorized 1984 made-for-television film biopic of Nadia Comăneci
- Nadia (TV series), a 1988 Iraqi television series
- Nadia: The Secret of Blue Water, an anime by Gainax
- Linux Mint distribution 14

== See also ==
- Nadja (disambiguation)
- Nadiya (disambiguation)
- Nadhiya, Indian actress
