= Nadine =

Nadine may refer to:

== People ==
- Nadine (given name)
- Nadine, Countess of Shrewsbury (1913–2003), English opera soprano

== Film and TV ==
- Nadine (1987 film), a 1987 film with Jeff Bridges and Kim Basinger
- Nadine (2007 film), a 2007 Dutch film with Monic Hendrickx

== Music ==
=== Musicians ===
- Nádine, South African singer
- Nadine Coyle, Irish singer from pop group Girls Aloud

=== Songs ===
- "Nadine" (song), a 1964 song by Chuck Berry
- "Hello, Nadine", a 1976 song by British band Mungo Jerry
- "Nadine", a 1994 single by punk band Alice Donut
- "Nadine", a 2003 song by Frank Black and the Catholics from Show Me Your Tears
- "Nadine", a 2009 song by Fool's Gold from Fool's Gold

=== Albums ===
- Nadine (album), a 1986 album by George Thorogood
- Nadine (EP), a 2020 EP by Nadine Coyle
- Nádine, a 1997 album by South African singer Nádine

== Other ==
- Nadine (magazine), a Lebanese magazine
- Nadine, New Mexico, U.S.
- Hurricane Nadine, 2012
