= Nadja =

Nadja may refer to:

- Nadja (given name), including a list of people and fictional characters
- Nadja, a pen name of Louisa, Marchesa Malacrida de Saint-August (1896–1934), British poet
- Nadja (novel), a 1928 surrealist novel by André Breton
- Nadja (film), a 1994 vampire film by Michael Almereyda
- Nadja (band), a Canadian drone doom metal side project of Aidan Baker

== See also ==
- Nadia (disambiguation)
- Nadiya (disambiguation)
