= Journal of Vocational Behavior =

- Discipline: Applied psychology, career development
- Language: English
- Edited by: Nadya A. Fouad

Publication details
- History: 1971-present
- Publisher: Elsevier
- Frequency: Bimonthly
- Impact factor: 5.2 (2021)

Standard abbreviations
- ISO 4: J. Vocat. Behav.

Indexing
- CODEN: JVBHA2
- ISSN: 0001-8791
- LCCN: 70024832
- OCLC no.: 1783396

Links
- Journal homepage; Online access

The Journal of Vocational Behavior is a bimonthly peer-reviewed academic journal covering career development. It was established in 1971 and is published by Elsevier. The editor-in-chief is Nadya A. Fouad (University of Wisconsin-Milwaukee). According to the Journal Citation Reports, the journal has an impact factor of 5.2.
