= Edwin Ramsey =

US Army officer (1917-2013)

- Ramsey in 1948
- Born: May 9, 1917; Carlyle, Illinois
- Died: March 7, 2013 (aged 95); Los Angeles, California
- Relatives: Anne Ramsey (Cousin)
- Military career
- Allegiance: United States
- Branch: United States Army
- Service years: 1941–46
- Rank: Lieutenant colonel
- Unit: 26th Cavalry Regiment (Philippine Scouts)
- Conflicts: World War II
- Awards: Distinguished Service Cross; Silver Star; Purple Heart

Lieutenant Colonel Edwin Price Ramsey (May 9, 1917 – March 7, 2013) was a United States Army officer and guerrilla leader during the World War II Japanese occupation of the Philippines. Early in the war, he led the last cavalry charge in American military history.

== Early life ==
Edwin Ramsey was born in Carlyle, Illinois. The family moved, first to El Dorado, Kansas, when he was two, and then to Wichita ten years later. His father committed suicide after being arrested on suspicion of battering his wife. Ramsey's mother was a dermatologist who later ran her own clinic. His older sister, Nadine, became one of the first female United States Mail pilots and ferried fighters and bombers in World War II.

Ramsey graduated from Oklahoma Military Academy in Claremore, Oklahoma, in May 1938. He attended the University of Oklahoma, but left to enlist in the United States Army in 1941.

== World War II ==
In February 1941, Second Lieutenant Ramsey was assigned to the 11th Cavalry Regiment at Campo, California. When volunteers were requested for the 26th Cavalry Regiment (Philippine Scouts) in the Philippines, he jumped at the opportunity. Ramsey recalled later that "... I didn't even know where it was, except that it was a warm country, it was tropical and they had a good polo team there." He had been on the Oklahoma Military Academy polo team and played on the losing side of a polo match in the Philippines the day before Japan attacked Pearl Harbor; the umpire was Major General Jonathan M. Wainwright (who would later assume command of the South West Pacific Area after General Douglas MacArthur was evacuated to Australia).

As a first lieutenant during the withdrawal to Corregidor in the Philippines Campaign, he was in command of the 27-man, mostly Filipino E/F Troop when they encountered the enemy in the village of Morong on the Bataan peninsula on January 16, 1942. Despite being heavily outnumbered by an infantry force supported by tanks, Ramsey ordered the last cavalry charge in American military history. The surprised Japanese broke and fled. Ramsey and his men held their position for five hours under heavy fire, until reinforcements could be brought up. He would later be awarded the Silver Star and the Purple Heart for this action.

After the fall of Bataan, Ramsey and Captain Joseph Barker made their way to central Luzon and joined Lieutenant Colonel Claude Thorp, who had been given the task of organizing guerrilla resistance by MacArthur. Luzon was divided into four regions, and Barker was given responsibility for the East Central Luzon Guerrilla Area (ECLGA), extending from Manila to Lingayen Gulf. After Thorp was captured by the Japanese in October 1942, Barker took his place, putting Ramsey in charge of the ECLGA. Barker himself was eventually caught and executed by the Japanese. The guerrilla force under Ramsey's command grew to nearly 40,000. They fought using captured and hand-made weapons ("We made arms out of sawed-off pipes that we used as shotguns."), gathered intelligence and distributed propaganda.

Allied forces landed in Luzon in early January 1945. On June 13, General MacArthur personally awarded Ramsey the Distinguished Service Cross for his guerrilla activities. Ramsey, already a major by 1943, was promoted to lieutenant colonel shortly before being ordered back to the United States. The ordeal in the Philippines had taken its toll – he had lost half his weight and was down to only 93 pounds (42 kg) in January 1945 – and he spent nearly a year recovering from malaria, dysentery, and acute malnutrition in the hospital. Lieutenant Colonel Ramsey received a medical discharge in 1946.

== Post-war ==
Ramsey obtained a law degree at the University of Oklahoma. He was a vice president of Hughes Aircraft Corporation's Far East division in Japan. He later headed electronics and consulting firms in Taiwan and the Philippines. When he retired, he settled in California.

He co-wrote his memoirs, Lieutenant Ramsey's War: From Horse Soldier to Guerrilla Commander, published in 1990.

== Personal life ==
In 1948, he married Madeleine Willoquet, the daughter of the French ambassador in Manila. They had four children. They divorced in the 1970s. He then married Raquel Ramirez in 1979.

== Death and legacy ==
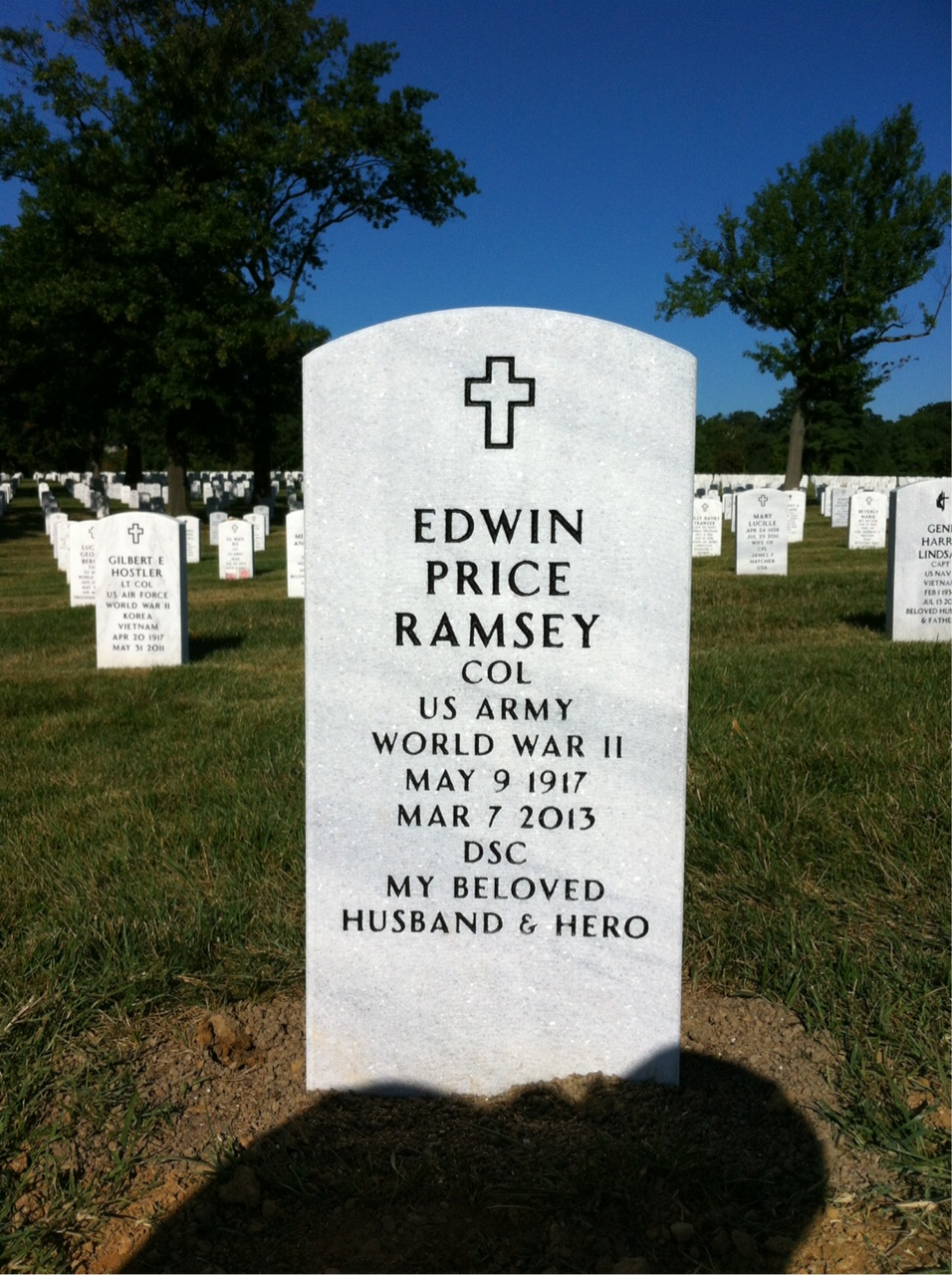
Ramsey's grave at the Arlington National Cemetery

Edwin Price Ramsey died of natural causes on March 7, 2013, and was buried with full military honors at Arlington National Cemetery on June 28. He was survived by his second wife and his four children from his first marriage.
