= Amel Senan =

Iraqi Turkmen actress (born 1966)

Emel Sinan
- Born: Emel Sinan Sa'ed; October 22, 1966 (age 58); Baku, Azerbaijan, Union Soviet Socialist Republics
- Occupation: Actress
- Years active: 1987–1988

Emel Sinan Saeed Abdullqader (Arabic: أمل سنان سعيد عبد القادر; born October 22, 1966) is an Iraqi Turkmen actress known for her role of Nadia of the 1988 Iraqi television series Nadia.

== Personal life ==
Emel Sinan was born in Baku, Azerbaijan to an Iraqi Turkmen father, Sinan Saeed Abdul Qadir (1934 - 06/03/1991), who was a writer and broadcaster, and an Azerbaijani mother. She has worked with her father in Baghdad, Turkey, Azerbaijan, and Europe. In the 1980s they settled in Baghdad.

== Filmography ==
=== Actress ===
Title	Date	Role	Notes
Nadia (Iraqi TV Series)	1988	Nadia	Leading role
6/6 Iraqi comedy film	1988	Doctor	

== Awards ==
Year	Award	Category	Film	Result
1988	Best Actress in Iraq	Best Actress in 1988	Nadia (Iraqi TV series)	Won
