= Hani Sarie-Eldin =

Egyptian businessman

- هاني سري الدين

Member of the Egyptian Senate
- Incumbent
- Assumed office 2020

Chairman of the Capital Market Authority
- In office 2005–2007

Personal details
- Education: Cairo University (LL.B., LL.M.); Queen Mary University of London (Ph.D.)
- Occupation: Lawyer, legal scholar, politician
- Profession: Professor of Commercial Law
- Known for: Founder of Sarie-Eldin & Partners; former Chairman of the Egyptian Capital Market Authority; Deputy President of the El-Wafd Party

Hani Sarie-Eldin is an Egyptian lawyer and writer. He has published many articles and books in English and Arabic focusing on law, economic development and how economic reform is not possible without institutional and social reform to turn policies and visions into reality.

He has been chairman of the Egypt Financial Supervisory Authority during 2005-2007.

== Education and early academic career ==
Hani Sarie-Eldin earned his LL.B. with distinction from Cairo University in 1987, followed by postgraduate diplomas in public law (1988) and private law (1989), ranking first in both classes. He was subsequently appointed as a teaching assistant in the university's Department of Commercial and Maritime Law.

In 1995, he obtained a Ph.D. in International Business Law from the Center for Commercial Law Studies at Queen Mary University of London. Returning to Cairo University, he advanced through the academic ranks to become Professor of Commercial and Business Law, teaching international trade law, corporate finance, and commercial legislation.

== Publications ==
Sarie-Eldin has numerous legal publications in Arabic and English.

=== Arabic books ===
- Egyptian Companies Law, (4 editions: 1998; 2000; 2003; 2008), Dar El Nahda.
- Negotiation of Contracts, 1999, Dar Al Nahda Al -Arabia.
- Infrastructure Projects Privately Financed, 2001, Dar Al Nahda Al-Arabia.
- Transfer of Technology, 2003, Dar Al Nahda Al-Arabia.
- Mandatory Tender Offers,2013, Dar Al Nahda A-Arabia.

=== English books ===
- Consortia Agreements in the International Construction Industry: With Special Reference to Egypt, 1996, Kluwer Law International.
- Commercial Companies in Egypt, 2000, Cairo University.

=== Arabic articles ===
Sarie-Eldin has written many research articles in Arabic, some of which have been translated to English and French.

- Arbitration in Joint Ventures Disputes, 1998, Al Ahkam, pp. 81–121.
- BOT Projects, 1999, Arab Universities Union, vol 9, pp. 321–397.
- Private-Public-Partnerships, Al Ahram Al -Ektisady, vol.177, Sep 2002, pp. 3– 175.
- Weekly articles in Al-Akhbar newspaper, titled "Out Of The Box" (Men Kharg el Sandok) since July 2014.

=== English articles ===
- Financial Disputes in the Arab Middle East with Special Reference to Egypt, published in "Non-Judicial Dispute Settlement in International Financial Transactions", 2000, Norton and Andens.
- International Construction Contracts in the Middle East: An Analysis of the Application of FIDIC Conditions, published in "Commercial Law in the Middle East" (ed), 1995, Graham & Trotman.
- Securities Law Models in Emerging Economies, by Sarie Eldin and Joseph Norton, published in "Emerging Financial Markets and the Role of International Financial Organizations", 1996, Norton and Andens.
- "Operation of FIDIC Civil Engineering Conditions in Egypt and Other Arab Middle Eastern Countries". The International Lawyer. 28 (4): 951–972. 1994. JSTOR 40707183.
