= Nadezhdinsky =

Nadezhdinsky (masculine), Nadezhdinskaya (feminine), or Nadezhdinskoye (neuter) may refer to:

- Nadezhdinsky District, a district of Primorsky Krai, Russia
- Nadezhdinsky (rural locality) (Nadezhdinskaya, Nadezhdinskoye), name of several rural localities in Russia
