= Yvonne Pothier =

Canadian mathematics educator, nun, and activist for refugees

Sister Yvonne Marie Pothier (born 1937) is a Canadian mathematics educator and educational psychologist known for her work in the development of numerical concepts in children, and an activist for refugees. She is a professor emerita of education at Mount Saint Vincent University in Halifax, Nova Scotia, and a Sister of Charity of Saint Vincent de Paul in the Roman Catholic Archdiocese of Halifax-Yarmouth.

== Mathematics ==
Pothier graduated from Mount Saint Vincent University in 1966 with a Bachelor of Science, and earned a bachelor of education in 1977 from the University of New Brunswick. She earned a master's degree and Ph.D. at the University of Alberta; her dissertation, Partitioning: Construction of Rational Number in Young Children, was supervised by Daiyo Sawada. She published a condensed version of the same work as an influential journal paper with Sawada. She also coauthored the book Learning Mathematics In Elementary And Middle School: A Learner-Centered Approach (with Nadine Bezuk, W. George Cathcart, and James H. Vance, Pearson, 2003; 6th ed., 2015).

== Refugee work ==
In later life, Pothier became active in work with refugees, coordinating the Refugee Sponsorship Program of the Catholic Archdiocese of Halifax, visiting Sudan in this connection, and assisting in the sponsorship of many refugees in Halifax. For this work she won the Elizabeth Ann Seton Award of the Sisters of Charity, and was commended by the Nova Scotia House of Assembly.
