= Nadezhdinsky (rural locality) =

Nadezhdinsky (Russian: Наде́ждинский; masculine), Nadezhdinskaya (Наде́ждинская; feminine), or Nadezhdinskoye (Наде́ждинское; neuter) is the name of several rural localities in Russia:

- Nadezhdinsky, Republic of Bashkortostan, a khutor in Ivano-Kuvalatsky Selsoviet of Zilairsky District of the Republic of Bashkortostan
- Nadezhdinsky, Republic of Mordovia, a settlement in Novobayevsky Selsoviet of Bolsheignatovsky District of the Republic of Mordovia
- Nadezhdinskoye, a selo in Birobidzhansky District of the Jewish Autonomous Oblast
