= Hani Gabra =

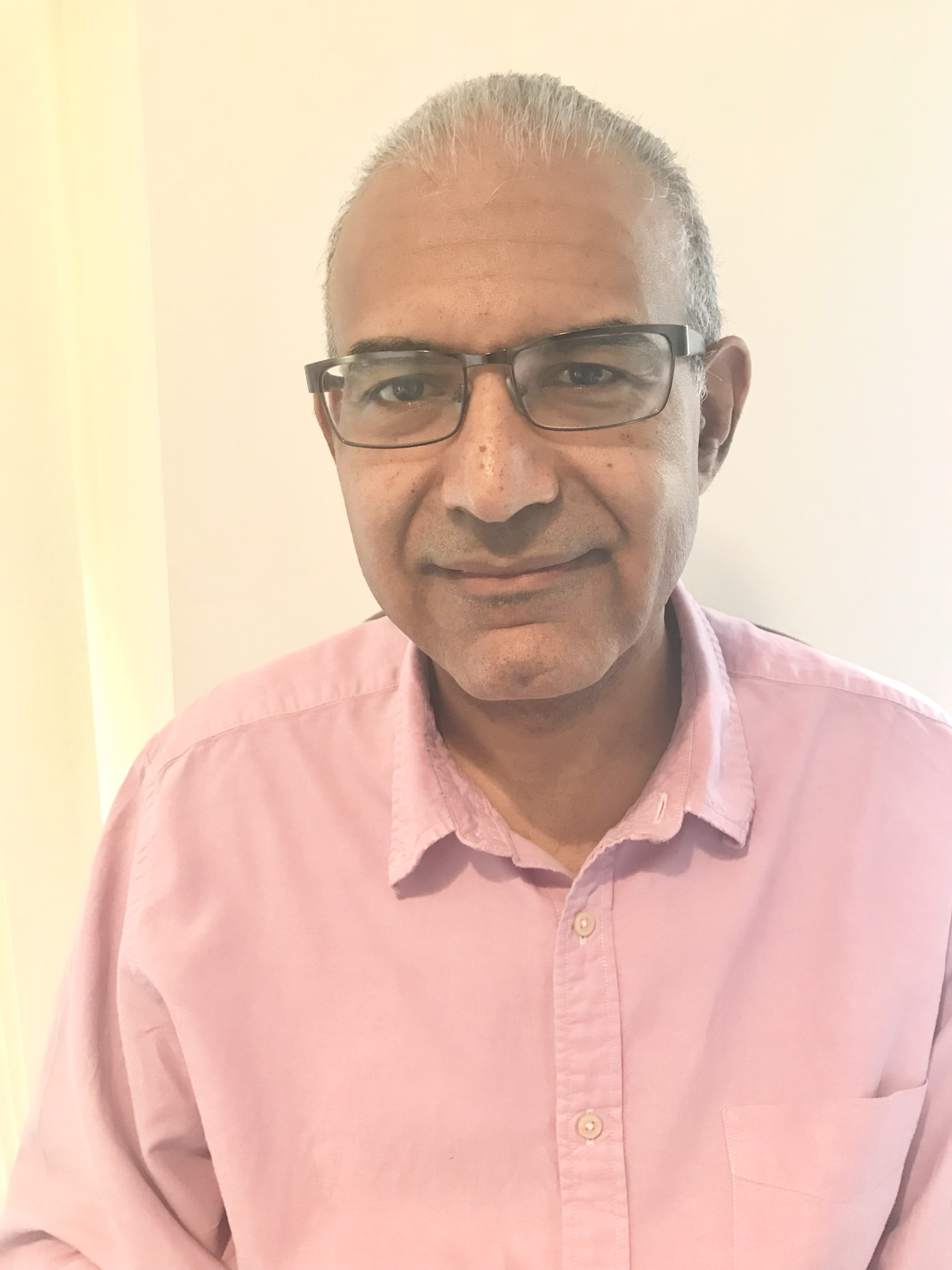
Hani Gabra

Hani Gabra FRCPE FRCP (Born 15 January 1963) is a British oncologist and Professor Emeritus in Medical Oncology at Imperial College London. Prof Gabra is Founder and Chief Scientific Officer of Papyrus Therapeutics, a preclinical stage Cancer Biotech company registered in Delaware and currently practises as a Consultant Medical Oncologist at Portsmouth Hospitals NHS Trust, acting as Trust Lead Cancer Clinician.

== Career ==
Hani Gabra is a British academic medial oncologist and drug developer. He is founder, board member and chief scientific officer of Papyrus Therapeutics Inc., an emerging biotech company focussed on extra-cellular tumour suppressor therapies for cancer. He is also Professor Emeritus in Medical Oncology at Imperial College London (2020-) and adjunct professor at the Centre for Cancer Biomarkers at the University of Bergen in Norway.

From 2019 to 2021 he was chief medical officer for BerGenBio ASA having previously held the position of chief physician scientist and Vice President / Head of the Clinical Discovery Unit in Early Clinical Development within the IMED Biotech Unit at AstraZeneca in Cambridge, UK (2017–19).

Previously he was Professor of Medical Oncology at Imperial College London and Honorary Consultant Medical Oncologist at Imperial College Healthcare NHS Trust, based at the Hammersmith Campus of Imperial College (2003–20).Until May 2017 he was Head of the Molecular Therapeutics Unit, Deputy Head of the Division of Cancer and Director of the Ovarian Cancer Action Research Centre at Imperial College, and at Imperial College Healthcare NHS Trust he was also Head of Medical Oncology and Chair of the Cancer Research Committee. Until May 2017 he was also associate director and Lead of the Cancer Division (Division 1) of the National Institute for Health and Care Research (NIHR) Clinical Research Network for North West London.

Hani was educated at Carluke High School and studied medicine at the University of Glasgow, graduating with a BSc (Hons) in Molecular Biology and MB ChB in 1987. After obtaining MRCP(UK) in 1990, he undertook an MSc in Clinical Oncology and a PhD in Molecular Oncology from the University of Edinburgh. He then completed his specialist training in Cancer Medicine in Edinburgh and was CRUK Clinical Scientist and Consultant Medical Oncologist at the CRUK Edinburgh Medical Oncology Unit from 1998 to 2003, following which he took up his Chair appointment at Imperial College.

He is a Fellow of the Royal College of Physicians of Edinburgh and London.

His research is involved in trying to understand the role of tumour suppressor genes in ovarian cancer, particularly how OPCML regulates networks of receptor tyrosine kinases and how WWOX acts to regulate taxane sensitivity.

His clinical / translational interests relate to the understanding of platinum resistance in ovarian cancer, and he has developed several molecular targets whose inhibition can reverse platinum resistance from laboratory to clinic; such targets include AKT, MTOR, HDAC4, STAT1 and the Folate Receptors.

Until September 2017 he was founding President of the European Translational Ovarian Cancer Network (EUTROC), a multinational group that undertakes science in ovarian cancer clinical trials, principally in the context of complex phase II clinical trials.

He previously sat on CRUK CTAAC funding committee for the UK and the INCa Scientific Evaluation Committee, Institut National Du Cancer of France

He has been on the Editorial Boards of several journals including Gynecologic Oncology and the European Journal of Cancer.

== Selected publications ==
Sellar, Grant C; Watt, Karen P; Rabiasz, Genevieve J; Stronach1, Euan A; Li, Li; Miller, Eric P; Massie, Charles E; Gabra, Hani; et al. (2003). "OPCML at 11q25 is epigenetically inactivated and has tumor-suppressor function in epithelial ovarian cancer". Nature Genetics. 34 (3): 337–343. doi:10.1038/ng1183. PMID 12819783. S2CID 24411276.
