= Nadine Laporte =

American academic

Nadine Laporte Goetz
- Born: Nadine Therese Laporte; France
- Education: PhD in Tropical Ecology and Remote Sensing from Paul Sabatier University in Toulouse France
- Occupations: Researcher and Professor of Tropical Ecology and Remote Sensing
- Known for: Remote sensing research
- Spouse: Scott J. Goetz

Nadine Therese Laporte is a researcher and academic in the fields of forestry and remote sensing.

== Early life and education ==
Nadine Therese Laporte was born in France. She is the only child of two farmers from a small farming community.

Laporte was the recipient of several French government and European grants to pursue higher education in France and Italy. She obtained a Diploma of General Studies in Sciences in 1982, Bachelor of Biology in 1984, Master in Biology of Organisms and Populations in 1985, Advanced Studies Degree in Ecology in 1986, and a Doctorate in Tropical Ecology and Remote Sensing in 1990, which was a relatively new field at the time. She received her PhD from Paul Sabatier University in Toulouse.

While in school she interned at the Laboratory for International Mapping in France because Paul Sabatier University did not have a remote sensing division. This was a relatively new field at the time.

== Career ==
Prior to becoming a scientist at the Woods Hole Research Center, where she was director of the Africa program, she conducted postdoctoral research at the University of Maryland in College Park and NASA’s Goddard Space Flight Center in Greenbelt Maryland.

She is adjunct research professor at Northern Arizona University.

== Research ==
Much of Laporte's research focuses on mapping and monitoring carbon emissions, deforestation, and forest biomass. The main area of study is tropical and sub-tropical land masses. Much of her work has focused on Africa, particularly in the Democratic Republic of Congo (DRC). The satellite remote sensing data is used to assess how much CO_{2} would be released into the atmosphere if a forest were to be cut down, based on the amount of biomass in existing trees. It can also help record the amount of biomass, which then contributes to these CO_{2} estimates. This recording of biomass is not only to assess CO_{2} emissions, but also to contribute to the conservation of forest species, including primates.

Laporte's research contributed to tropical forest policies a part of REDD+ (Reducing Emissions from Deforestation and forest Degradation.) REDD+ is a policy mechanism to reduce carbon emissions by helping to protect tropical forests and lessen deforestation. She assisted the government of the Democratic Republic of the Congo to quantify forest carbon stocks and emissions reporting for REDD+ under the UN Framework Convention on Climate Change (UNFCCC). This method was suggested because it would help protect biodiversity, people living in the area, and maintaining stored carbon in these tropical ecosystems.

== Other roles ==
Laporte has been a panelist and guest speaker for NASA, the ClimateWorks Foundation, Woods Hole Research Center, and several other research programs.

She was the principal investigator for NASA’s Land-Cover and Land-Use Change Program (LCLUC) project: An Integrated Forest Monitoring System (INFORMS) for Central Africa. This project began in 2000 and ended in 2003. Collaboration between multiple entities, including in-country National Forest Services, developed a forest monitoring system in this study. She was also the principal investigator for the project Forest Biomass and Land-Use Change in Central Africa: Reducing Regional Carbon Cycle Uncertainty, starting 2004 and ending in 2007. This study aimed to develop remote sensing that could be utilized for national reporting.

== Publication ==
Laporte's articles have been published in Nature Climate Change, Carbon Balance and Management, Science, International Journal of Remote Sensing,Society for Conservation Biology, Environmental Conservation, Environmental Research Letters, International Forestry Review, American Journal of Primatology, and Nature Sustainability.

== Personal life ==
Laporte is married to Scott J. Goetz, a professor of informatics, computing, and cybersystems at Northern Arizona University.
