= Nadine Provençal =

Canadian researcher

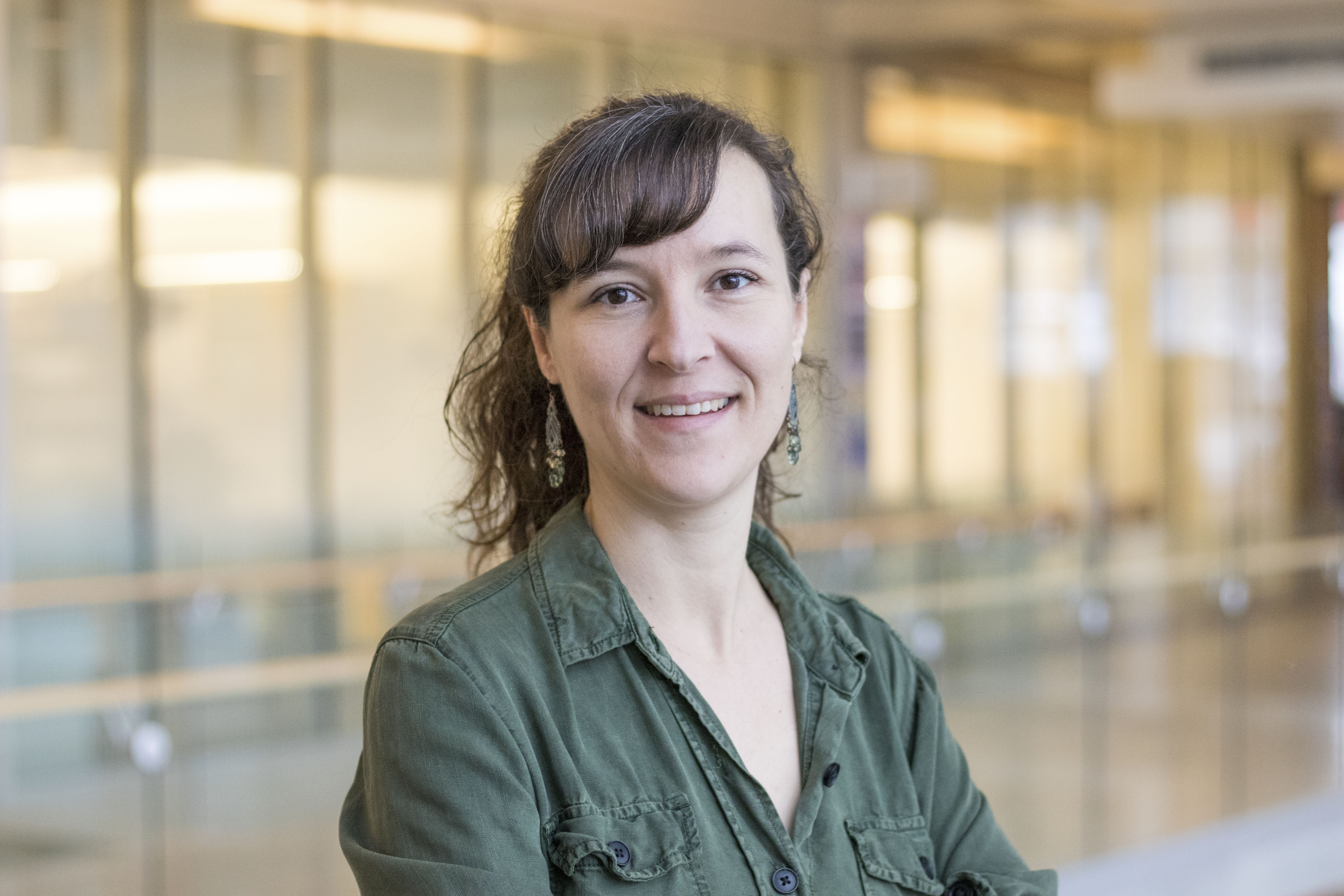
- Awards: CIFAR Global Scholars, Canadian Institute for Advanced Research, 2020 and 2026. Canadian Institutes of Health Research Fellowship, 2015–2017. Richard Todd Award, International Society of Psychiatric Genetics, 2014.

Academic background
- Education: BSc, Biology, 2004, Université Laval; PhD, Pharmacology and Therapeutics (Epigenetics), 2013, McGill University
- Alma mater: McGill University
- Thesis: (2013)

Academic work
- Discipline: Epigenetic, stress, mental health
- Institutions: Simon Fraser University
- Website: https://www.sfu.ca/fhs/about/people/profiles/nadine-provencal.html

Nadine Provençal is a Canadian researcher in health sciences whose academic path has focused on biology, epigenetics, early life adversity, and developmental trajectories of health and disease. Her research focuses on epigenetics of anxiety and stress-related disorder She is an assistant professor at Simon Fraser University and worked as an Investigator at BC Children's Hospital Research Institute. In 2020, she was recognized by the Canadian Institute for Advanced Research (CIFAR) with an appointment to CIFAR Global Scholar.

== Early life and education ==
Provençal earned a Bachelor of Science degree in Biology, with a focus on genetics and molecular and cellular biology, from Université Laval. She then pursued doctoral studies at McGill University in Pharmacology and Therapeutics, specializing in epigenetics. Her PhD research examined the epigenetics of early life adversity and aggression in children and macaques. She completed the degree in 2013 in collaboration with the Research Unit on Children's Psychosocial Maladjustment (GRIP) in Montréal.

Provençal continued her training through postdoctoral work at the Université de Montréal, where she further developed her research on epigenetics and child behaviour. She later received a Canadian Institutes of Health Research fellowship to undertake additional postdoctoral training at the Max Planck Institute of Psychiatry in Germany, focusing on epigenetic mechanisms involved in our response to stress and psychiatric disorders using a neuronal cellular model and longitudinal cohorts.

== Career ==
In 2017, Provençal was recruited for a joint appointment at Simon Fraser University faculty of Health Sciences. She also serves as an Investigator at BC Children's Hospital Research Institute and remains connected to the Max Planck Institute of Psychiatry as a Guest Research Scientist. She received $450,000 through the Canada Foundation for Innovation John R. Evans Leaders Fund to open and lead the Epigenomics of Developmental Trajectories laboratory, which would include sequencing platform capable of analyzing the entire genome of multiple individuals.

Across these roles, she has built a research program that connects molecular biology with urgent questions in child health and mental health. Her work combines knowledge from multiple field of study including molecular biology, epigenomics, bioinformatics, psychology and psychiatry with cellular and animal models, as well as human cohort to study these complexes behaviours and disorders.

Provençal received the Richard Todd Award from the International Society of Psychiatric Genetics in 2014, recognizing her research contribution to the genetics of child psychiatry. In 2020, Provençal was recognized by the Canadian Institute for Advanced Research (CIFAR) with an appointment to CIFAR Azrieli Global Scholar.

== Research Contributions ==
Provençal's central contribution is to developmental epigenetics: the study of how environmental exposures can influence gene regulation without changing the underlying DNA sequence. Her work focuses on the biological embedding of early life adversity, exploring how stress, trauma, caregiving environments, and other early experiences may leave molecular signatures that affect brain development, stress regulation, behaviour, and long-term health.

Her studies have examined DNA methylation patterns associated with maternal rearing, childhood physical aggression, glucocorticoid exposure, and stress-related psychiatric risk. By combining evidence from animal models, cellular systems, and longitudinal human cohorts, her work bridges basic molecular science and population health, helping to explain how early adversity can become linked to later vulnerability—or, in some cases, resilience.

The broader promise of Provençal's research lies in its translational reach. By identifying biological pathways associated with early experience, her work may inform prevention, early intervention, and future therapeutic strategies aimed at improving child health and reducing the long-term burden of stress-related disorders.

== Selected Publications from Provençal's team ==
- Barr, E., Comtois-Cabana, M., Coope, A., Côté, S. M., Kobor, M. S., Konwar, C., Lupien, S., Geoffroy, M.-C., Boivin, M., Provençal, N., Catherine, N. L. A., Dennis, J. K., & Ouellet-Morin, I. (2025). Early-life adversity and epigenetic aging: Findings from a 17-year longitudinal study. Biomolecules, 15(6), 887. https://doi.org/10.3390/biom15060887
- Arcego, D. M., Buschdorf, J. P., O'Toole, N., Wang, Z., Barth, B., Pokhvisneva, I., Rayan, N. A., Patel, S., de Mendonça Filho, E. J., Lee, P., Tan, J., Koh, M. X., Sim, C. M., Parent, C., de Lima, R. M. S., Clappison, A., O'Donnell, K. J., Dalmaz, C., Arloth, J., Provençal, N., Binder, E. B., Diorio, J., Silveira, P. P., & Meaney, M. J. (2024). A glucocorticoid-sensitive hippocampal gene network moderates the impact of early-life adversity on mental health outcomes. Biological Psychiatry, 95(1), 48–61. https://doi.org/10.1016/j.biopsych.2023.06.028
- Provençal, N., Arloth, J., Cattaneo, A., Anacker, C., Cattane, N., Wiechmann, T., Röh, S., Ködel, M., Klengel, T., Czamara, D., Müller, N. S., Lahti, J., Räikkönen, K., Pariante, C. M., & Binder, E. B. (2020). Glucocorticoid exposure during hippocampal neurogenesis primes future stress response by inducing changes in DNA methylation. Proceedings of the National Academy of Sciences, 117(38), 23280–23285. https://doi.org/10.1073/pnas.1820842116
- Provençal, N., & Binder, E. B. (2015). The effects of early life stress on the epigenome: From the womb to adulthood and even before. Experimental Neurology, 268, 10–20. https://doi.org/10.1016/j.expneurol.2014.09.001
- Provençal, N., Suderman, M. J., Guillemin, C., Massart, R., Ruggiero, A., Wang, D., Bennett, A. J., Pierre, P. J., Friedman, D. P., Côté, S. M., Hallett, M., Tremblay, R. E., Suomi, S. J., & Szyf, M. (2012). The signature of maternal rearing in the methylome in rhesus macaque prefrontal cortex and T cells. Journal of Neuroscience, 32(44), 15626–15642. https://doi.org/10.1523/JNEUROSCI.1470-12.2012
