= Nadiya (disambiguation) =

Nadiya is a feminine given name.

Nadiya or Nadiia may also refer to:

- Nâdiya, French R&B singer Nadia Zighem (born 1973)
  - Nâdiya (album), a 2006 album by the above
- Nadiia, Luhansk Oblast, Ukraine, a village
- Nadiia, Donetsk Oblast
- Nadiia, Zaporizhzhia Oblast
- Nadiia, Odesa Oblast
- Nadiia, Kamianske Raion, Dnipropetrovsk Oblast
- Nadiia, Shyroke settlement hromada, Kryvyi Rih Raion, Dnipropetrovsk Oblast
- Nadiia, Lozuvatka rural hromada, Kryvyi Rih Raion, Dnipropetrovsk Oblast

== See also ==
- Nadia (disambiguation)
