= Nadine Orenstein =

American art historian and curator (born 1961)

Nadine M. Orenstein
- Born: 1961 (age 64–65)
- Education: Barnard College
- Occupations: curator, art historian

Nadine Orenstein (born 1961) is an American art historian and curator specializing in European prints, drawings, and illustrated books, especially Dutch, Flemish, and German works through the nineteenth century.

She is the Drue Heinz Curator in Charge of the Department of Drawings and Prints at The Metropolitan Museum of Art in New York City, where she has worked for much of her career and has led the department since 2015.

Her scholarship and exhibitions have focused on artists including Pieter Bruegel the Elder, Hendrick Goltzius, Rembrandt, and Hercules Segers, and she has contributed extensively to the study of early modern Netherlandish print culture.

== Biography ==
Her father is French, a professor of physics at Queens College in New York City, and she often traveled in Europe during her childhood, often visiting museums as a child. Her mother Gloria Orenstein was a professor at University of Southern California and wrote about Leonora Carrington and the women of Surrealism, among other subjects.

She earned her BA from Barnard College in 1983 and her PhD from the Institute of Fine Arts, New York University, in 1992, where her dissertation examined Hendrick Hondius and the business of prints in seventeenth-century Holland.

She conducted graduate research in the Netherlands while a graduate student, as part of writing her dissertation on the Dutch printmaker and publisher Hendrick Hondius.

== Curatorial Career ==
Orenstein has been with The Metropolitan Museum for much of her career, beginning her tenure in 1992, and became the Curator in Charge of the department in 2015, succeeding George Goldner.

Her expertise and contributions have greatly strengthened The Met's collection and exhibitions, making her contributions to the field of prints and curation influential in the wider museum and art historical fields..

Orenstein is on the editorial board of Print Quarterly and the Rijksmuseum Bulletin. In 2025, she became Knight of the House of Orange-Nassau, for her contributions to Dutch art and culture.

== Exhibitions ==
Orenstein has organized and curated numerous significant exhibitions, including:

- "Pieter Bruegel the Elder: Drawings and Prints" (2001)
- "Hendrick Goltzius, Dutch Master (1558-1617): Prints, Drawings, and Paintings" (2003)
- "The Mysterious Landscapes of Hercules Segers" (2017)
- "The Renaissance of Etching" (2019–2020)
