= Hani Hayajneh =

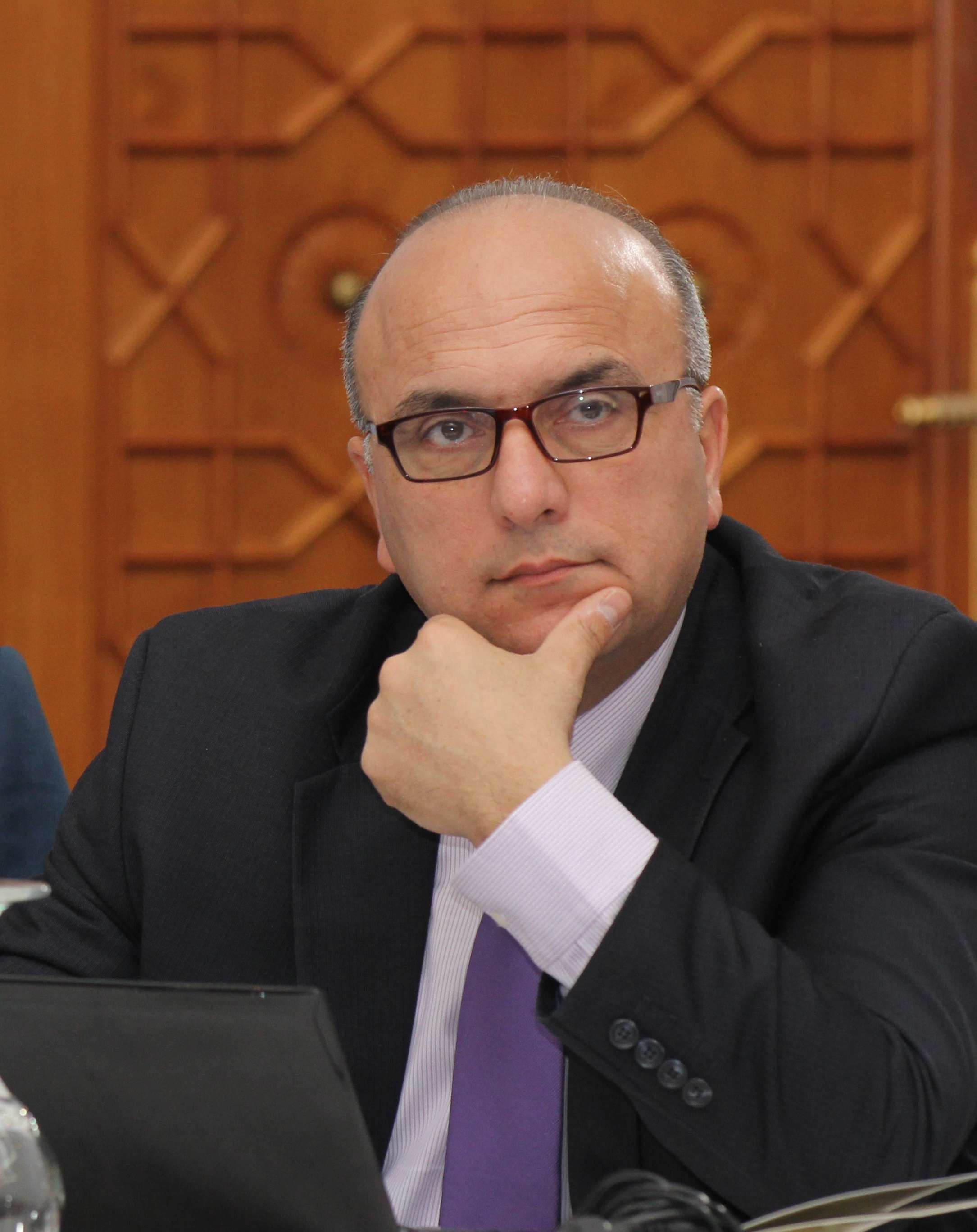
- Born: 1965 (age 60–61); Deir Al-Siʿneh, Jordan
- Education: Yarmouk University (B.A., Msc); Free University of Berlin (Ph.D. 1998)
- Scientific career
- Fields: Ancient Near Eastern Languages and civilizations

Hani Hayajneh (born 1965 in Deir Al-Siʿneh, Jordan) is a professor of Ancient Near Eastern Languages and civilizations at Yarmouk University, Jordan. He is expert in the field of cultural heritage studies, especially the Intangible cultural heritage. His research focuses on areas including the cultural history and heritage of the Arabian Peninsula from ancient periods to modern times. He represented Jordan on cultural heritage issues in the Intergovernmental Committee of the UNESCO Convention for Safeguarding Intangible Cultural Heritage.

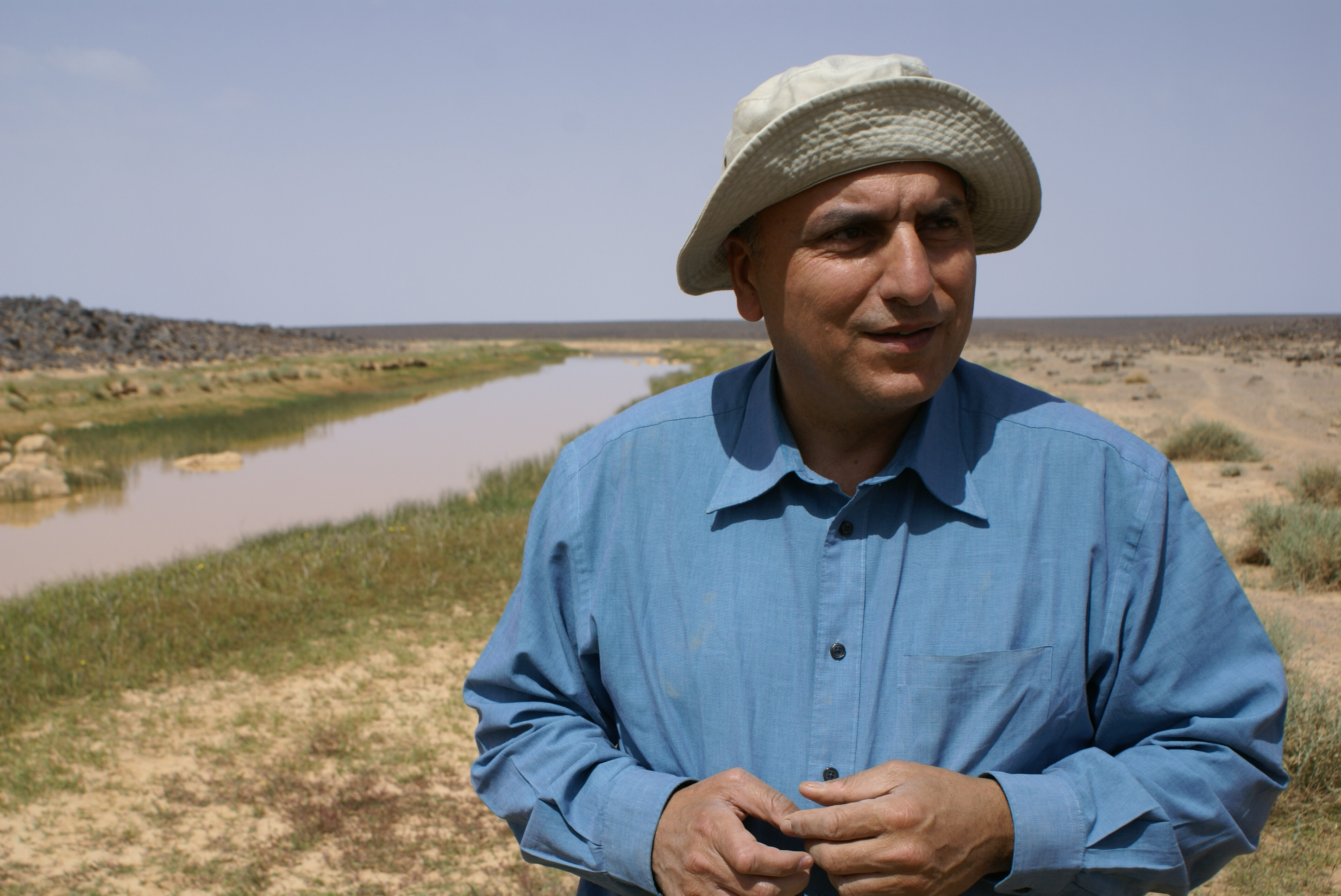

== Life ==
He was born in 1965 in a town called Deir Al-Siʿneh in northern Jordan, the eldest among eleven brothers and three sisters and a son of a businessman. He started his elementary school at the Roman Catholic School in Irbid – Jordan and other schools in northern parts of the country. He is a father of three daughters, Thurayya, Yasmin and Bana. In 1983 he attended the Arabic Department at Yarmouk University in Irbid and in 1988 he began his graduate studies at the Institute of Archaeology and Anthropology, Yarmouk University. Emeritus Professor George Mendenhall paved his way to scholarly life. Under his supervision he began to explore the origins of Arabic, as he advised him to examine the lexical relationship between Arabic and the Late Bronze Ugaritic language.

In 1993, he started through a DAAD scholarship his doctoral studies at the Faculty of Historical and Cultural studies of the Free University of Berlin, Germany. He spent five years at the Department of Semitic and Arabic studies exploring under Professor Rainer Voigt and Professor Walter W. Müller (University of Marburg) the ancient cultures and languages of Arabia and the Levant.

In 1998, he was recruited by the Institute of Archaeology and Anthropology at Yarmouk University. Since the beginning of his work there, he developed curricula, enhanced the Institute's international relationships, built up the library, conducted archaeological and epigraphical surveys, etc. His research focuses on areas including the cultural history and heritage of the Arabian Peninsula from ancient periods to modern times. In 2008, he started to represent his country in UNESCO cultural heritage related meetings and occasions.

In 2004/05, he was a visiting professor (as a Fulbright Fellow) in the Department of Near Eastern Languages and Civilizations at Harvard University and later in other international academic institutions, including the Collège de France, Sorbonne University, both in Paris, Free University of Berlin, Philipps University in Marburg, Stockholm University, Copenhagen University, the American University of Beirut and Leiden University in Holland.

In 2011 he received an eighteen-month scholarship Alexander von Humboldt Scholarship for Experienced Scholars to conduct research at the Centre of Middle and Near Eastern Studies of the Philipps University in Marburg, Germany. He serves as an Ambassador Scientist for this foundation since the beginning of 2016.

== Scientific work ==
He got involved in field projects in the Jordanian Badiya by conducting epigraphical and archaeological surveys. In addition, he started a long-term project that leads to a sort of dictionary of pre-Islamic Arabian deities and practices. He is also working on finding a methodology which aims to explain words in the Quran on the basis ancient near eastern languages, like Ancient South Arabian, Old Ethiopic, and other Semitic languages. He is taking part in The Doha Historical Dictionary of Arabic which will detail the origins of every word in its corpus and record the transformations in each word's meaning by relying on an extensive body of primary materials in the Arabic language, drawn from centuries of the Arabic canon. It is the first time in the history of Arabic lexicology that we witness the contribution of the Arabian epigraphy in the Arabic lexicon. This important source covers the period between the 8th century B.C and the 4th century A.D. In the field of intangible cultural heritage, he is elaborating the best practices strategies that would help the Jordanian and Arab governments and communities to safeguard Jordan's intangible cultural heritage.

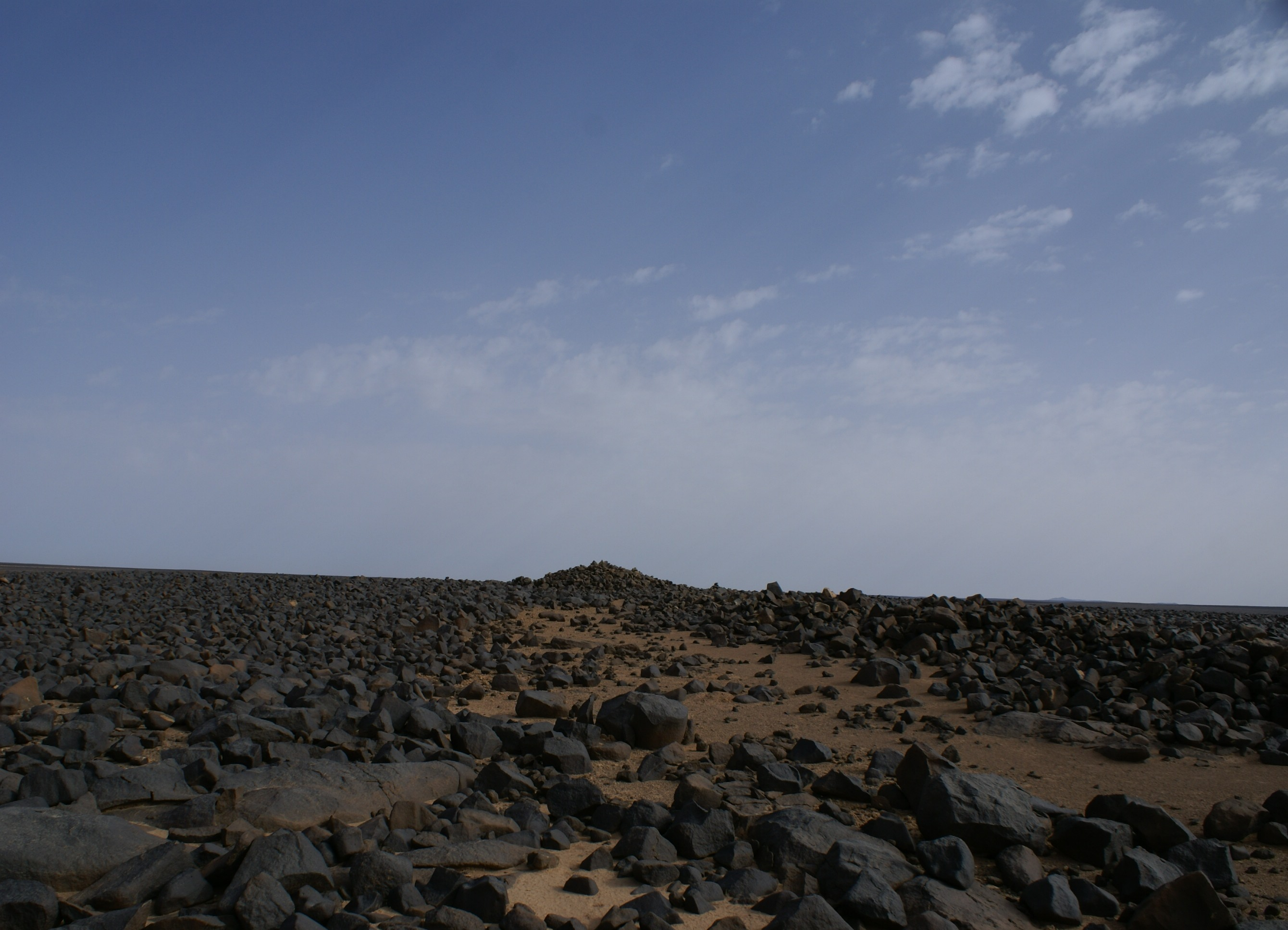

== Memberships ==
Hayajneh is a member of several professional national and international committees, boards, councils, and national and international commissions, including the Jordanian National Committee for developing Scientific research, the Special Committee of the Scientific Research Support Fund for Social and Humanity Sciences of the Ministry of Higher Education and Scientific Research, the Board of Trustees of the Jordan Applied University College of Hospitality and Tourism Education, and the Prime Minister of Jordan's Higher National Committee of Heritage. He is a member of international associations in the Arab World and Europe as well. He has also represented Jordan on cultural heritage issues in several international venues, notably the Intergovernmental Committee of the UNESCO Convention for Safeguarding Intangible Cultural Heritage.
