= Nadya Larouche =

Canadian writer from Quebec

Nadya Larouche (Pointe-du-Lac, 1956-) is a Canadian writer from Quebec. After studying in University of Ottawa, she travelled to Mexico, West Canada and Ontario. When she was back in Quebec, she published several books for children and theatre plays.

== Works ==
- Les mystères de l'île Brisée, 1994
- Mission spéciale pour l'AAA, 1994
- L'aventurière du 1588, 1994
- Curieuse visite chez l'apprentie sorcière, 1995
- L'étrange coffre-fort d'Oscar W. Dunlop, 1995
- Nord-est vers l'inconnu, 1995
- Les prisonniers de l'autre monde, 1995
- Alerte à la folie, 1996
- Cauchemar sous la lune, 1996
- L’armoire aux trois miroirs, 1997
- La forêt des Matatouis, 1997
- Le génie des perséides, 1997
- L'ennemi aux griffes d'acier, 1998
- La foire aux mille périls, 1998
- L'hallucinant passage vers Krullin, 1998
- Comme un tour de magie, 2014
