= Hani Hagras =

British computer scientist

Hani Hagras is a computer scientist and professor from the University of Essex, Colchester, UK was named Fellow of the Institute of Electrical and Electronics Engineers (IEEE) in 2013 for contributions to fuzzy systems in particular for his work on Type-2 fuzzy sets and systems. He is also a Fellow of the IET and a Principal Fellow of the Higher Education Academy (PFHEA), an award issued by Advance HE. Prof. Hagras is Chair of the Centre for Computational Intelligence (C4CI), and co-chair of the Artificial Intelligence Research Group at the University of Essex. He is also Chief Scientific Officer at Temenos AG.

Prof. Hagras research on Type-2 fuzzy sets and systems and Explainable Artificial Intelligence has been funded by Innovate UK, European Commission, the UK Department of Trade and Industry (DTI), UK Technology Strategy Board (TSB), UK Engineering and Physical Sciences Research Council (EPSRC), UK Economics and Social Sciences Research Council (ESRC), the Higher Education Funding Council for England (HEFCE), the German Federal Ministry of Education and Research (IB-BMBF), the Taiwan National Science Foundation, Korea-UK Science and Technology fund and industrial corporations. He has also served as Program Chair for international conferences such as IEEE Conference on Fuzzy Systems and serves as associate editor on top journals on the Area of Fuzzy Systems, Artificial Intelligence, Robotics, and Ambient Computing.

He has published over 300 peer-review articles and has an h-index of 52.
