= Hani Fadzil =

Malaysian radio presenter (born 1991)

- Born: Intan Farhani binti Mohd Fadzil; 25 July 1991 (age 34)
- Education: SMK Sri Aman; Diploma in Mass Communication from IACT College Petaling Jaya; Bachelor of Mass Communication (Cloud Communication) at the University of Hertfordshire UK
- Occupations: Radio presenter; Host Television
- Employers: ERA (2014-2019); MIX (2025-present)
- Spouse: Wan Faiz Wan Nor (m. 2017, divorced)
- Children: 1
- Parent: Mohd Fadzil Mohd Ali (father)

Intan Farhani Mohd Fadzil (born 25 July 1991) also known as Hani Fadzil is a radio presenter and host in Malaysia.

== Radiography ==
=== Radio ===
| Year | Title | Station |
|---|---|---|
| 2014 - 2019 | Super 40 ERA | ERA |
| 6 January 2025 - present | MIX Days | MIX |

== Filmography ==
=== Television ===
| Year | Title | As | TV Channel | Notes |
|---|---|---|---|---|
| 2020 | MPop! | Host | TV3/TV9 | |
