= Nadine Njeim =

Nadine Njeim may refer to:

- Nadine Nassib Njeim (born 1984), Lebanese actress and former Miss Lebanon 2004
- Nadine Wilson Njeim (born 1988), Lebanese actress and former Miss Lebanon 2007
