= Nadezhdinsky, Republic of Bashkortostan =

Nadezhdinsky Надеждинский
- Khutor
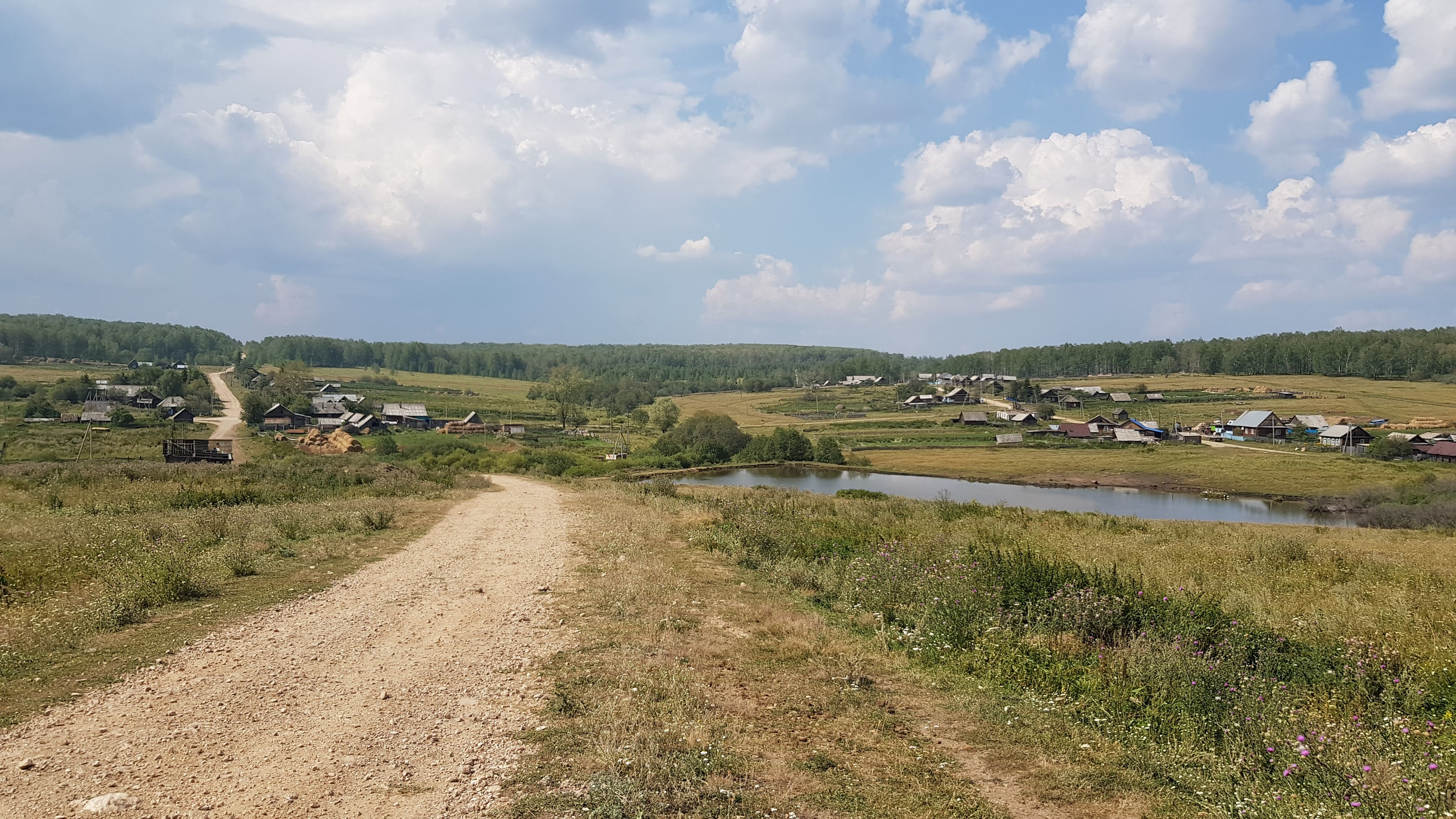
- View of Nadezhdinsky

- Location within Bashkortostan Location within Russia
- Coordinates: 52°41′N 57°36′E
- Country: Russia
- Region: Bashkortostan
- District: Zilairsky District
- Time zone: UTC+5:00

Nadezhdinsky (Russian: Надеждинский) is a rural locality (a khutor) in Ivano-Kuvalatsky Selsoviet, Zilairsky District, Bashkortostan, Russia. The population was 140 as of 2010. There are 3 streets.

== Geography ==
Nadezhdinsky is located 67 km north of Zilair (the district's administrative centre) by road. Shulka is the nearest rural locality.
