= Nadine B. Ramsey =

American aviator (1911–1997)

Nadine Bernice Ramsey (1911–1997) was an American aviator who became one of the first two women to fly mail for the US Postal Service. She was a Women Airforce Service Pilot and one of only twenty-six WASPs to pilot a Lockheed P-38 Lightning during World War II.

== Family and early life ==
Ramsey was raised in Illinois and Kansas. Her father worked as a "wildcatter" in oil fields and was often away from home. Ramsey and her younger brother, Edwin, often witnessed their father hitting their mother. When she was seventeen, her father was arrested for spousal abuse after Nadine and Edwin had to drag him away from their mother. That night, he committed suicide in his cell. After his death, Ramsey's mother raised the children alone. To help support her family, Ramsey dropped out of school and became a secretary. After work, she would go to the nearby Beechcraft plane factory for flying lessons. At first, she kept her lessons a secret from most people, believing a woman pilot would be considered scandalous. She gave flying lessons to Edwin, who described her as “an expert, instinctive flier.”

Ramsey's mother, Nelle, was a cosmetologist and dermatologist. Her brother became an officer in the US Army and a guerrilla leader in the Philippines during World War II.

== Aviation career ==
Ramsey became an aviator in 1937, making headlines when she flew a Kansas airmail route on May 19, 1938. She and Charlotte Frye were the first women to carry mail for the Postal Service. On May 22, she flew in an airshow in Hutchinson, Kansas.

By 1940, Ramsey was living in Manhattan Beach, California, where she advertised and sold Taylorcraft airplanes. She also carried passengers for a fee. On September 2, 1940, Ramsey was flying over the mountains near Lake Henshaw with a passenger named Gertrude Snow. As she tried to land, the plane's landing gear hit a tree, causing it to nosedive. Snow received "fractures of both arms and a badly mangled leg". Ramsey was treated for "possible serious internal injuries". Her back and several of her ribs were broken, and she was badly concussed. One of her legs was nearly amputated, but a friend, claiming to speak for her family, had Ramsey transferred to an LA hospital where doctors saved the leg. Edwin dropped out of law school to care for her while she recovered. By December, Ramsey could walk, and by February, she was flying again.

Ramsey joined the Women Airforce Service Pilots in 1943. She graduated with the 43 W-5 Class on September 12, 1943. Ramsey went on to pursuit school, where she learned to fly fighter planes, graduating on May 1, 1944. As a WASP, Ramsey piloted PT-19, BT-13, UC-78, AT-6, P-39, P-47 P-51, and P-63 planes. She was also one of the twenty-six WASPs who flew a Lockheed P-38 Lightning. Ramsey was initially stationed at Love Field, Texas, but asked to be transferred to the Long Beach Army Air Base in California, where she ferried fighter aircraft and was an instructor in "preflight transition". After the WASPs were disbanded, she stayed on the base as an attaché to the Sixth Army Ferrying Group.

In 1945, Ramsey bought her own P-38, an Army surplus, in Kingman, Arizona. The plane cost 1,250 dollars. Ramsey flew her P-38 for two and a half years, selling the plane when she could no longer afford to maintain it.
