= Hani Nasira =

Egyptian author and journalist

Hani Nasira (Arabic: هاني نسيرة) is an Egyptian author and journalist who specializes in ideological movements. He is currently a Research Unit Director at the Dubai based think tank, the Al Mesbar Studies and Research Centre.

His recent work includes research projects on development and democratic transformations and cognitive and political currents in the Arab world and is published regularly by Al Arabiya News Channel, Al-Hayat, The Jamestown Foundation and Arab Insight as well as Al Mesbar's own publications.

== Publications ==
Dr Nasira has authored several books, including Al-Qaeda and Jihadi Salafism: Intellectual Streams and Limits of Verification (2008); Religious Converts: A study of the phenomenon of conversion (2009); The Crisis of the Arab Renaissance and the War of Ideas (2009); and New Liberalism in the Arab World (2007).

His other published work includes: Ideology and the Road towards Humanizing Arabic National Thought – Cairo Center for Human Rights Studies (2002), Dr. Mahmoud Azmy a human rights pioneer in Egypt – Cairo Center for Human Rights (2005), Ministry of Culture – Journey of the Egyptian ministries - Center for Political and Strategic Studies at Al-Ahram (2003), The New Liberals in Egypt, a series of strategic notebooks - Center for Political and Strategic Studies at Al-Ahram (2006), and The Phenomenon of Intellectual Transformation in Egypt in the Mid Twentieth Century, Civilization Center (Al-Hadara Center) for Enhancing Islamic Ideology – Beirut (2009 (in printing process) as well as contributing to a number of other books.
