= Nadine Müller =

Nadine Müller is the name of:

- Nadine Müller (politician) (born 1983), German politician
- Nadine Müller (athlete) (born 1985), German discus thrower
