= Nadine Bezuk =

American mathematics educator

Nadine S. Bezuk is an American mathematics educator, and a professor emerita of teacher education at San Diego State University, where she is a former associate dean and former Qualcomm Professor of Teacher Education, the former director of the San Diego State University School of Teacher Education, and the former president and executive director of the Association of Mathematics Teacher Educators.

== Education and career ==
Bezuk is originally from Pittsburgh. She has a bachelor's degree in child development and early childhood education from the University of Pittsburgh, and a master's degree and Ph.D. in mathematics education from the University of Minnesota.

She worked as a K-12 mathematics teacher from 1981 through 1984, and joined the San Diego State University faculty in 1987.

She was president of the Association of Mathematics Teacher Educators from 1997 to 1999, and executive director from 2001 to 2014, and has also served as a director of the National Council of Teachers of Mathematics.

== Book ==
Bezuk coauthored the book Learning Mathematics In Elementary And Middle School: A Learner-Centered Approach (with Yvonne Pothier, W. George Cathcart, and James H. Vance, Pearson, 2003; 6th ed., 2015).
