= Nadia (TV series) =

- Genre: Romance-drama-detective
- Created by: Salah Karam
- Presented by: TV Iraq, the official Warka of the television production
- Starring: Amel Senan; Iraqi Hassan Hosni; Wajeeh Abdul-Ghani; Sami Kaftan; Sana Abdul-Rahman; Hadeel Kamel; Zaher Al-Fahid; Wajdi al-Ani; Ibtisam Farid; Aziz Khyoun; Bahjat Al- Jubouri; Iqbal Naeem; Amera Jiwad; Sadia Al-Zaidi; Sami El Sarraj
- Opening theme: "Shjaha Al-nnas" Theme, Sung by Kazem El Saher
- Ending theme: "Nadia," composed by Jaafar Al-Khaffaf
- Composers: Jaafar Al-Khaffaf; and the playing band Ra'ad George
- Country of origin: Iraq
- Original language: Arabic
- No. of seasons: 1
- No. of episodes: 24

Production
- Executive producer: Wajeeh Abdul-Ghani
- Producers: TV Iraq, the official
- Production location: Baghdad
- Running time: 60 minutes.

Original release
- Network: TV Iraq, the official
- Release: October 1 – October 30, 1988

Nadia is an Iraqi television series consisting of twenty-four episodes, directed by Salah Karam and starring Hassan Hosni and Amel Senan. The series follows Adel (played by Hassan Hosni), a man who falls in love with a mysterious woman who vanishes without explanation. Everyone around him, including family and close friends, denies that she exists. Following the events of the series, a complex conspiracy is revealed, organized by the owner of a hotel (played by Wajeeh Abdul-Ghani), and the woman discloses that her name is Nadia.

== Cast ==
=== Main ===
- Hassan Hosni as Adel
- Amel Senan as Nadia

=== Supporting ===
- Wajeeh Abdul-Ghani
- Sami Kaftan
- Sana Abdul Rahman
- Zaher Al-Fahid
- Hadeel Kamel
- Wajdi al-Ani
- Ibtisam Farid
- Aziz Khyoun
- Bahjat Al- Jubouri
- Iqbal Naeem
- Amera Jawad
- Saadia al-Zaidi
- Shehab Ahmed
- Sami El Sarraj
- Taha Salem
- Meqdad Muslim
- Iltfat Aziz
- Azzedine Tabou
- Subhi Qasem
- Leila Georgis
- Ahlam Arab
- Taleb Al-Rifai
- Ferial Karim
- Qahtan Zughayyar
- Mutashar Al-Sudani
- Magda El-Saadi
- Azhar Al-Fourati
- Redha Nidham
- Walid al-Obeidi
- Jabbar Hasan
- Ali Ihsan Al-Jarrah
- Subhi Sabri
- Hassan fashil
- Essam Abdel-Rahman
- Hikmat Al- Qaisi
- Karem Jallob
- Salam al-Samarrai

=== Supporting – children ===
- Ahmed Mohammed
- Nada Taha Salim
- Hamlet Sabah
- Hamdi Saleh
- Ammar Fadhel
- Salah Zaid

== Production ==
The series was produced in Baghdad in 1987 and broadcast on TV Iraq in late 1988. It marked the first television appearance of Amel Senan, who won the Best Actress award in Iraq for 1988 for her performance in the title role. The series was written by Ma'ath Joseph and directed by Salah Karam. The theme song, "Shjaha Al-nnas", was performed by Kazem El Saher, with lyrics by Karem Al-Iraqi and music composed by Jaafar Al-Khaffaf, performed by the Ra'ad George band.

=== Crew ===
- Make-up: Yusuf Salman
- Assistant directing: Akram Kamil and Najim Ali Jadoua
- Executive Producer: Wajeeh Abdul-Ghani
- Output port: Taleb Al-Rifai
- Distribution: Warka of the television production
- Written by: Ma'ath Joseph
- Director: Salah Karam

== Reception ==
Nadia attracted significant viewership upon its broadcast on TV Iraq in 1988. The series gained attention for its theme song, "Shjaha Al-nnas" (meaning "What Happened to People"), performed by Kazem El Saher early in his career, as well as for its plot, which centered on a mystery that sustained audience engagement across its run.

== Awards ==
Year	Award	Category	Film	Result
1988	Best Actress in Iraq	Best Actress in 1988	Nadia - Iraqi TV Series	Won the title
