= Nadezhda (given name) =

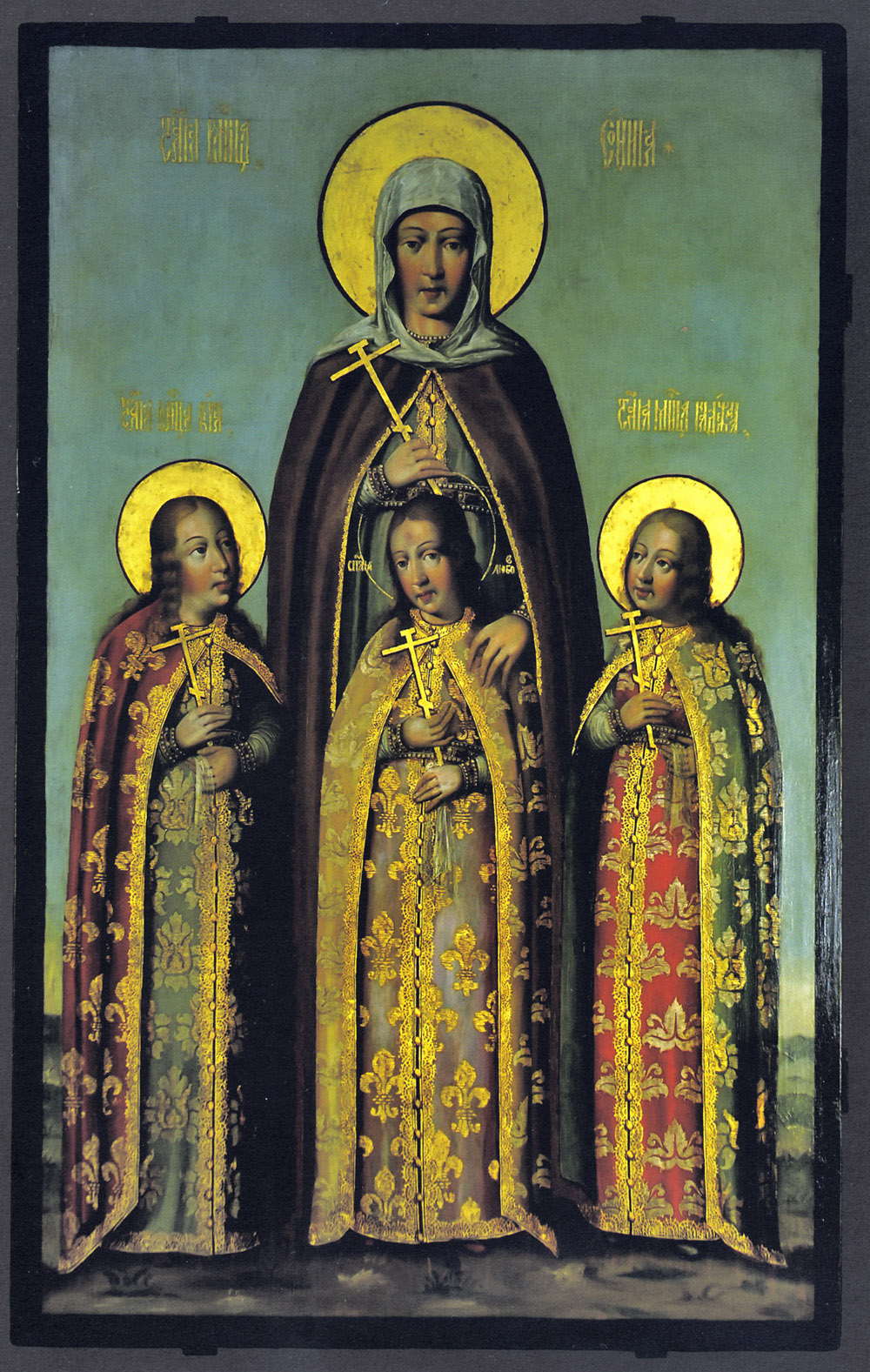
- Pronunciation: Bulgarian: [nɐˈdɛʒdə] Russian: [nɐˈdʲeʐdə]
- Gender: Female

Origin
- Origin: Bulgaria/Russia/Serbia
- Meaning: Hope

Other names
- Related names: Nadia, Nadja, Nadine, Nadina, Nadeschda

Nadezhda or Nadežda (Cyrillic: Надежда) is a Slavic female given name popular in Belarus, Bulgaria, North Macedonia, Russia, Serbia, Ukraine and other Slavic countries to a lesser extent, as well as other former Soviet states such as Azerbaijan and Uzbekistan. The origin of the name in Old Slavic meant "hope", but this meaning was preserved only in Bulgarian, Macedonian and Russian. The name is a translation of the Greek name Ἐλπίς (Elpis), with the same meaning.

The name entered the Russian culture as part of the trio: Vera, Nadezhda, and Lyubov as a calque from Greek of the names of saints Faith, Hope and Charity.

A Russian-language diminutive form of this name is Nadia (Cyrillic Надя). The Belarusian version is Nadzeya (Надзея, Łacinka: Nadzieja, like in Polish), the Ukrainian version is Nadiya (Надія), and the Czech version is Naděžda, where it can also be shortened to Nad'a. In Serbo-Croatian, it can be shortened to more common Nada or Nađa.

Transliteration variants include Nadejda, Nadeschda. Notable people with these names include:

== In politics and public life ==
- Nadezhda Alliluyeva (Надежда Аллилуева, 1901–1932), second wife of Joseph Stalin
- Nadezhda Bondarenko (Надежда Бондаренко, born 1950), Transnistrian politician and presidential candidate in the 2006 election
- Nadezhda Chaikova (Надежда Чайкова, 1963–1996), Russian correspondent known for exposés of Russian military atrocities and close contacts with the Chechen rebels
- Nadezhda Joffe (Надежда Иоффе, 1906–1999), Soviet Trotskyist and daughter of Soviet leader Adolph Joffe
- Nadezhda Krupskaya (Надежда Крупская, 1869–1939), Russian Marxist revolutionary and wife of Vladimir Lenin
- Nadezhda Neynsky, (Надежда Нейнски, born 1962; formerly Nadezhda Mihaylova, Надежда Михайлова), MEP since 2009, Bulgarian foreign minister 1997–2001, also leader of the Union of Democratic Forces from 2002 to 2005
- Nadezhda Sigida (Надежда Сигид, 1862–1889), Russian revolutionary and central figure of the Kara katorga tragedy
- Nadezhda Stasova (1822–1895), early Russian feminist and educator
- Nadezhda Tolokonnikova (Надежда Толоконникова, born 1989), political activist and artist, nicknamed Nadya Tolokno (Надя Толокно); member of the feminist punk-rock collective Pussy Riot
- Nadezhda Tylik, a Kursk sailor's mother who was forcibly sedated on an internationally distributed news clip
- Nadezhda Vasilyeva (Надежда Васильева, died 1971), one of several women claiming to be Grand Duchess Anastasia Nikolaevna of Russia

== Sports ==
- Nadezhda Alexandrova (Надежда Александрова, born 1986), Russian ice hockey player
- Nadezhda Belonenko (Надежда Белоненко, 1911–1964), Soviet-Russian tennis player
- Nadezhda Besfamilnaya (Надежда Бесфамильная, born 1950), Soviet-Russian sprinter and Olympic bronze medalist
- Nadezhda Chizhova (Надежда Чижова, born 1945), Soviet-Russian shot putter and Olympic gold, silver and bronze medalist
- Nadia Comăneci (born 1961), Romanian gymnast and a five-time Olympic gold medalist
- Nadezhda Evstyukhina (Надежда Евстюхина, born 1988), Russian weightlifter
- Nadezhda Frolenkova (Надежда/Надія Фроленкова, born 1989), Ukrainian ice dancer
- Nadezhda Gumerova (Надежда Гумерова, born 1949), Soviet-Kazakhstani long-distance runner
- Nadezhda Ilyina (Надежда Ильина, 1949–2013), Soviet-Russian sprinter and Olympic bronze medalist
- Nadezhda Khnykina-Dvalishvili (Надежда Хныкина-Двалишвили, ნადეჟდა დვალიშვილ-ხნიკინა, 1933–1994), Soviet-Georgian track and field athlete and Olympic bronze medalist
- Nadezhda Konyayeva (Надежда Коняева, born 1931), Soviet javelin thrower and Olympic bronze medalist
- Nadezhda Kosintseva (Надежда Косинцева, born 1985), Russian chess player
- Nadia Marcinko (also Naďa, Nadežda Marcinková, born 1986), Slovak-American pilot
- Naďa Mertová, Czechoslovak orienteering competitor
- Nadezhda Morozova (Надежда Морозова, born 1996), Russian ice hockey player
- Nadezhda Morozova (Надежда Морозова, born 1998), Kazakhstani speed skater
- Nadezhda Olizarenko (née Mushta, Надежда Олизаренко (Мушта), 1953–2017), Soviet middle distance runner and Olympic gold and bronze medalist
- Nadia Petrova (Надежда Петрова, born 1982), Russian tennis player
- Nadezhda Ralldugina (Надежда Раллдугина/Надія Ралдугіна, born 1957), Soviet-born Ukrainian-Russian middle distance runner
- Nadezhda Stepanova (Надежда Степанова, born 1959), Soviet-Russian long-distance runner
- Nadezhda Torlopova (Надежда Торлопова, born 1978), Russian boxer and Olympic silver medalist
- Nadezhda Vinogradova (Надежда Мироманова, born 1958), Soviet heptathlete
- Nadezhda Wijenberg (née Ilyina, Надежда Вейенберг (Ильина), born 1964), Soviet-born Russian-Dutch long-distance runner who represented the Netherlands at the Sydney Olympics in 2000
- Nadezhda Yakubovich (Надежда Якубович/Надзея Якубовіч, born 1954), Soviet-Belarusian javelin thrower

== In the arts ==
- Nadezhda Babkina (born 1950), Russian and Soviet folk singer
- Nadežda Čačinovič (born 1947), Croatian philosopher, sociologist and author of Slovene descent
- Naďa Konvalinková (Naděžda Konvalinková; born 1951), Czech actress
- Nadezhda Kadysheva (Надежда Кадышева, born 1959), Russian folk-rock pop singer, lead singer of the Golden Ring ensemble. Honorary Citizen of Bugulma. People's Artist of Mordovia, Honored Artist of Tatarstan. "Honored Artist of the Russian Federation" (1993)
- Nadezhda Vladimirovna Lermontova (1885–1921), Russian painter
- Nadezhda Mandelstam (Надежда Мандельштам, 1899–1980), Russian writer and wife of poet Osip Mandelstam
- Nadezhda von Meck (Надежда фон Мекк, 1831–1894), Russian widow best known for her relationship with Pyotr Ilyich Tchaikovsky
- Nadezhda Mikhalkova (Надежда Михалкова, born 1986), Russian actress and daughter of Nikita Mikhalkov
- Nadezhda Misyakova (Надежда Мисякова, born 2000), Belarusian singer
- Nadezhda Obukhova (Надежда Обухова, 1886–1961), Russian mezzo-soprano
- Nadežda Petrović (Надежда Петровић, 1873–1915), Serbian painter
- Nadezhda Plevitskaya (Надежда Плевицкая, 1884–1940), Russian singer
- Nađa Regin (Nadežda Poderegin, 1931–2019), Serbian singer
- Nadezhda Repina (Надежда Репина, 1809–1867), Russian actress and soprano
- Nadezhda Rumyantseva (Надежда Румянцева, 1930–2008), Soviet and Russian actress
- Nadezhda Teffi (Надежда Тэффи, 1872–1952), Russian humorist writer
- Nadezhda Udaltsova (Надежда Удальцова, 1886–1961), Russian avant-garde artist
- Nadezhda Zabela-Vrubel (Надежда Забела–Врубель, 1868–1913), Russian soprano

== In the military ==
- Nadezhda Durova (Надежда Дурова, 1783–1866), woman who became a decorated soldier during the Napoleonic wars
- Nadezhda Popova (Надежда Попова, 1921–2013), squadron commander during World War II awarded the title Hero of the Soviet Union

== Fictional characters ==
- Nadezhda, original Russian name of Elizabeth Jennings on the TV series The Americans
- Nadezhda, on the TV series Dexter, who goes by the diminutive Nadia
- Nadia, on the TV series LOST, is Sayid's love interest
- Nadia, the main character on the Netflix TV series Russian Doll

== See also ==
- Nadia
- Nadine (given name)
- Nadiashda Galli-Shohat (1879–1948), Russian and American physicist
- Nadeschda Gernet (1877–1943), Russian mathematician and academic
