= Hany Eitouni =

Hany Eitouni is an American innovator and entrepreneur, and a cofounder of Berkeley, CA based Seeo, a company commercializing a novel battery technology utilizing solid polymers. In 2010 he was recognized by being listed in the MIT Technology Review's TR35 list.
