= Nadya A.R. =

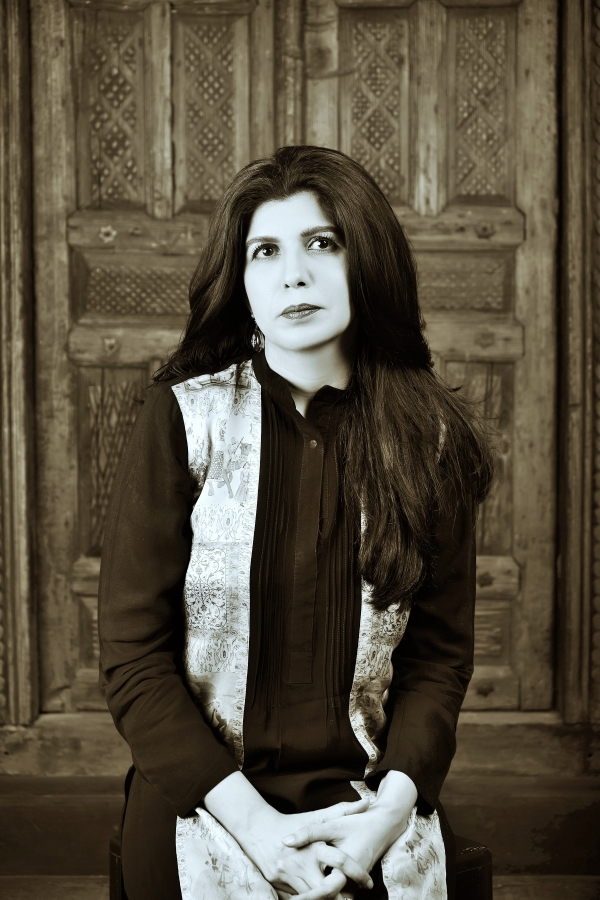
- Born: November 6, 1971 (age 54); Lahore, Punjab, Pakistan
- Occupations: Novelist; Author
- Spouse: Abbas Rahimtoola
- Children: 2
- Parents: Dr. Arshad Malik; Razia Arshad Malik
- Website: nadya-ar.com

Nadya A.R., also known as Nadya Abbas Rahimtoola, (b. 1971) is a Pakistani author, specialist teacher, journalist, and psychotherapist. Her published works include Broken Souls (1995), Kolachi Dreams (2006), and Invisible Ties (2017).

== Early life ==
Nadya A.R. was born in 1971, in Lahore, Pakistan. She attended Kinnaird College, Lahore, and then earned her B.B.A. (Hons) from Institute of Business Administration, Karachi, in 1993.

She has completed the Read/Hornsby Teacher Training Diploma (UK) and a Master's in Inclusive and Special Education, at University of Birmingham, U.K.

After relocating to Singapore, completed a master's degree in Contemporary Therapeutic Counselling (BMC, Singapore/ University of Hertfordshire, UK – 2011–2013).

== Career ==
In 2006, Nadya published her first novel, Kolachi Dreams. She is a certified psychotherapist and conducts workshops and talks, in Pakistan and Singapore.

== Critical reception ==
Critical reception for Kolachi Dreams includes praise from novelist and columnist Shobha De’, who stated at the novel's launch ceremony, "She knows her turf all right! Raw and searing, Nadya’s first book is a fast and furious read," and praised Nadya A.R. for her "immense boldness and courage" to write on the taboo topics and themes of the novel. Pakistani author Bapsy Sidhwa stated, "Nadya tells a chilling story set in today's Pakistan with flair. She is a promising new writer and knows how to engage the reader in this suspenseful work."

Critical reception for Invisible Ties includes a review by Muhammad Omar Iftikhar in the Daily Times, who writes, "Nadya’s words help readers visualize the story as it progresses – one page after the other. Her consistent usage of descriptive imagery to illustrate scenes, characters and their emotions may as well distract some readers. However, I adored how Nadya uses ‘show, don’t tell’ to perfection." In a review by Md Akhlaq for The Asian Chronicle, Akhlaq writes, "Author Nadya comes across as a keen observer of life and manages to capture the complexity of life beautifully in her writing. The narrative is beautiful and can be easily called poetry in prose, which is really very unique." In a review for Book World, Ritu Maheshwari writes, "The storyline and plot have all the potential to become a great novel, but the author spent her precious words in describing things and not emotions." Press Trust of India reports the book "has been commended by leading Indian personalities, including Mahesh Bhatt, Shobhaa De and Pakistani poet and columnist Salman Tarik Kureshi."

== Works ==
- Broken Souls (1995)
- Kolachi Dreams (2006), Sama Editorial and Publishing, ISBN 978-9698784478
- Invisible Ties (2017), Rupa Publications, ISBN 978-8129147974
