= Nadejda Brânzan =

Moldovan physician and politician (1948–2020)

Nadejda Brânzan OR
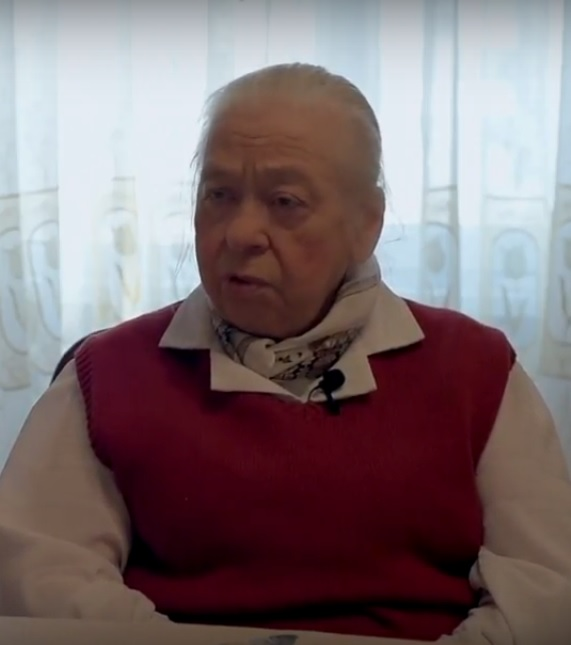
- Brânzan in 2018

Member of the Moldovan Parliament
- In office 10 March 1990 – 27 February 1994
- Parliamentary group: Popular Front
- Constituency: Rezina

Personal details
- Born: 29 August 1948 Rezina, Moldavian SSR, Soviet Union (present-day Moldova)
- Died: 25 May 2020 (aged 71) Chișinău, Moldova
- Party: Popular Front of Moldova

Nadejda Brânzan (29 August 1948 – 25 May 2020) was an infectious diseases physician from the Republic of Moldova, deputy of the Parliament in the Legislature 1990–1994.

== Biography ==
Nadejda Brânzan was born on August 29, 1948, in Rezina. She studied general medicine at the Institute of Medicine in Chișinău in 1966–1972. She worked as a doctor in Ștefan Vodă District until 1976, then a physician, head of department and deputy chief doctor at Rezina district hospital.

She devoted herself to politics in the 1990s. During the national liberation movement, she collected signatures to support the decree of the Romanian language as a state language. During the time she was a deputy, she was the chairman of the Committee on Women's Issues, Family Protection, Mother and Child, and also a member of the Presidium of Parliament. She contributed to the finalization of the Constitution of the Republic of Moldova and was among the signatories of the Declaration of Independence of the Republic of Moldova on 27 August 1991. She also voted to remove the CPSU out of the law.
