= Hani Al-Owaidh =

Saudi Arabian footballer

Personal information
- Full name: Hani Ahmed Al-Owaidh
- Date of birth: July 1, 1979 (age 47)
- Place of birth: Saudi Arabia
- Position: Goalkeeper

Senior career*
| Years | Team | Apps | (Gls) |
| 2000–2010 | Al-Qadisiyah | | |
| 2010 | Al-Faisaly | | |
| 2010–2011 | Al-Khaleej | | |
| 2011–2012 | Najran | | |
| 2014–2017 | Al-Adalah | | |
- * Club domestic league appearances and goals

Hani Al-Owaidh (Arabic: هاني العويض; born July 1, 1979) is a Saudi football player who plays as goalkeeper .
