= Hany Said =

Hany Said may refer to:

== People ==
- Hany Said (footballer, born 1980) (born 1980), Egyptian footballer
- Hany Said (footballer, born 1983) (born 1983), Egyptian footballer
