= Hany Salam =

Egyptian philatelist

Hany Salam is an Egyptian philatelist who was appointed to the Roll of Distinguished Philatelists in 2019. He is a specialist in the postage stamps and postal history of Egypt and has been secretary general of the Philatelic Society of Egypt.
