= Nadya A. Fouad =

American vocational psychologist

- Born: 1955 (age 70–71); Ames, Iowa, US
- Spouse: Bob Leitheiser (m. 1981)
- Awards: APA Distinguished Contributions to Education and Training in Psychology (2009)

Academic background
- Education: BS, Iowa State University; PhD, 1984, University of Minnesota

Academic work
- Institutions: University of Wisconsin-Milwaukee

Nadya A. Fouad (born 1955) is an American vocational psychologist. She is the Editor-in-Chief of Journal of Vocational Behavior and distinguished professor and chair of the Department of Educational Psychology at the University of Wisconsin-Milwaukee.

Fouad was recipient of the 2009 American Psychological Association Award for Distinguished Contributions to Education and Training in Psychology. Her award citation emphasized her contributions to "the development and implementation of the Multicultural Guidelines, her commitment to social justice and equality, and her pioneering work in establishing benchmarks for trainee competency."

== Early life and education ==
Fouad was one of two children born to Aziz and Lisa Fouad in Ames, Iowa in 1955. After travelling across the world with her family, she completed her Bachelor of Science degree at Iowa State University and PhD at the University of Minnesota in 1984.

== Career ==
Upon graduating from the University of Minnesota, Fouad began her career as a professor at the University of Wisconsin-Milwaukee (UWM). In this role, she led a three-year continual study aimed at "identifying supports and barriers that steer girls toward or away from science and math during their education." From 2008 until 2013, Fouad served as Editor in Chief of The Counseling Psychologist journal.

In 2014, Fouad continued to study the gender divide in STEM and led a study focusing on the status of women engineers nationally. Her research team studied why only 11 percent of practising engineers are female and found issues such as "lack of job satisfaction, lack of reliable female role models, inflexible work schedules, workplace discrimination, white mid-western men syndrome, and glass ceiling issues." She was later the recipient of the UWM Faculty Distinguished University Service Award. Following this, Fouad was appointed editor in chief of the Journal of Vocational Behavior for a six-year term and granted an inaugural endowed chair in educational psychology. While serving in this role, Fouad was ranked in the top 2% of scientists in the world in a study by Stanford University.

== Books ==
- Fouad, N. A., & Arredondo, P. (2007). Becoming culturally oriented: Practical advice for psychologists and educators. American Psychological Association.
- Fouad, N. A., Carter, J. A., & Subich, L. M. (Eds.) (2012). APA handbook of counseling psychology, Vol. 1: Theories, research, and methods. American Psychological Association.
- Fouad, N. A., Carter, J. A., & Subich, L. M. (Eds.) (2012). APA handbook of counseling psychology, Vol. 2: Practice, interventions, and applications. American Psychological Association.
- Swanson, J. L., & Fouad, N. A. (2020). Career theory and practice: Learning through case studies, 4th Edition. Sage Publications.
- Sue, D. W., Carter, R. T., Casas, J. M., Fouad, N. A., Ivey, A. E., Jensen, M., ... & Vazquez-Nutall, E. (1998). Multicultural counseling competencies: Individual and organizational development (Vol. 11). Sage Publications.
- Toporek, R. L., Gerstein, L., Fouad, N., Roysircar, G., & Israel, T. (Eds.) (2006). Handbook for social justice in counseling psychology: Leadership, vision, and action. Sage Publications.
