= Nadine Hani =

Lebanese news presenter

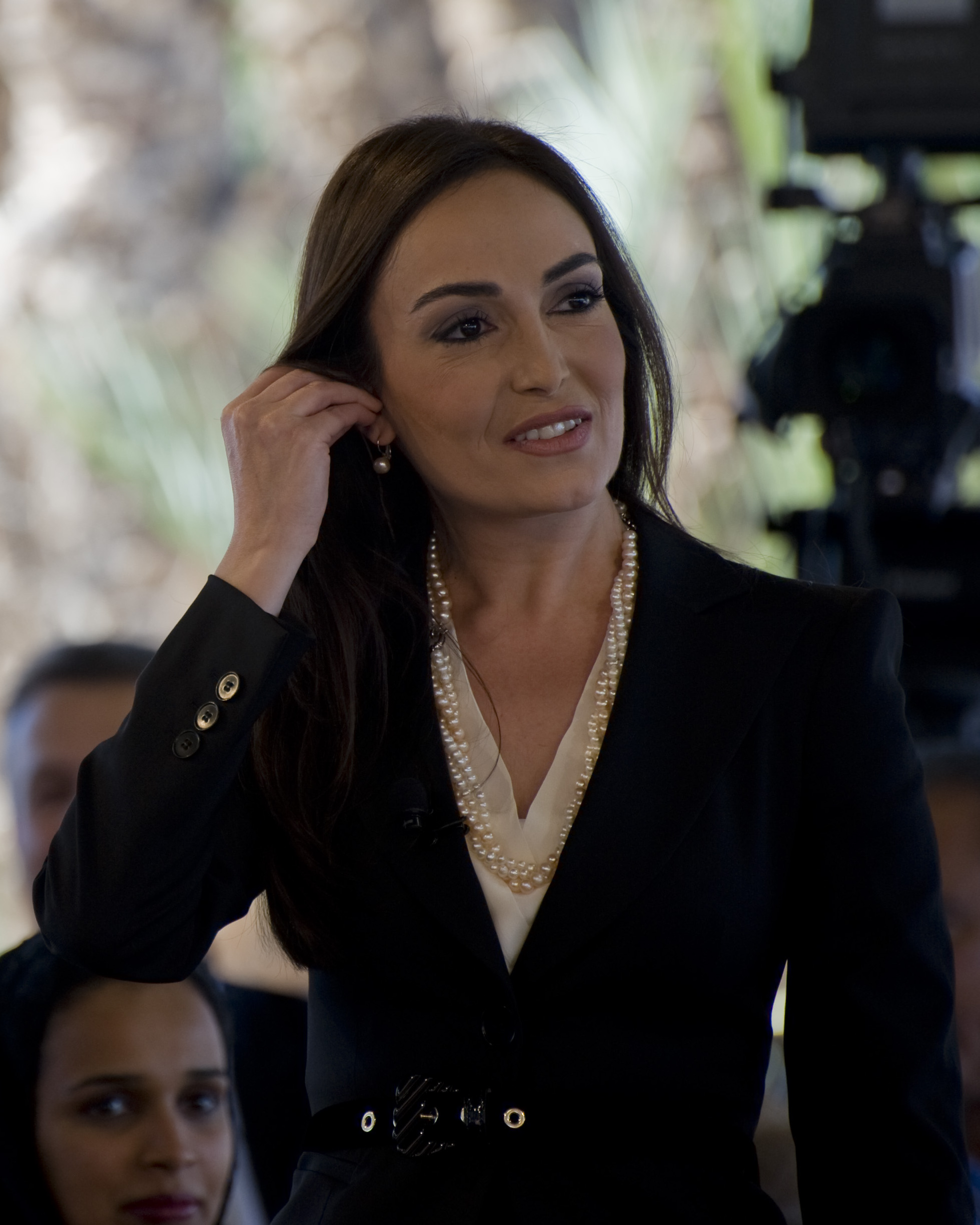
- Hani at the World Economic Forum on the Middle East in 2010
- Born: 1973 (age 52–53); Furn el Chebbak, Lebanon
- Occupation: Al Arabiya News Channel

Nadine Hani (Arabic: نادين هاني), is a Lebanese Senior Business News presenter on Al Arabiya News Channel, she is also a journalist on An-Nahar newspaper; she writes a weekly article on it.

== Career ==
Nadine studied Master of Business Administration at the American University of Beirut. She worked as a private banking consultant for two international banks in Lebanon, ABN AMRO Bank and BNP Paribas, advising high-net-worth individuals on investment alternatives. She started her career in media presenting a daily summary of business news at MTV in Lebanon, while working as a private banker, pioneering stock markets' coverage in the Arab world.

Nadine joined Al Arabiya in 2005 from CNBC Arabiya in Dubai, where she worked as a business news anchor, as well as hosting a personal finance show.

Nadine anchored Al Arabiya's special coverage of the major Cooperation Council for the Arab States of the Gulf (GCC) markets' correction that wiped up to 50 percent of the market capitalization of GCC stocks at the beginning of 2006. Her experience however goes beyond the newsroom to the field, where she has reported live from the NYSE, and has done investigative reports from major Arab cities especially Riyadh, Saudi Arabia.

She has also covered and reported from major international events and conferences, including the International Monetary Fund and World Bank 2006 meetings held in Singapore, the World Economic Forum Annual Meeting 2008, 2009 and 2011 in Davos, and the Euromoney 2006 conference "Building the Future" in Riyadh. Hani is often asked to moderate high profile conferences such as the panels at the World Economic Forum, and the "Leaders in Dubai".

During the course of her work in Al Arabiya, she has interviewed some of the most influential decision makers in the Arab business world, and internationally, including U.S. treasury secretary Henry Paulson, President of the World Bank Robert Zoellick, Chairman and CEO of Disney for 20 years Michael Eisner, Chairman of Kingdom Holding company H.H. Prince Al-Waleed Bin Talal Bin Abdulaziz Al-Saud, the Saudi minister of finance Dr. Ibrahim Abdulaziz Al-Assaf, Lebanese central bank governor Dr. Riad T. Salameh, Chairman of the Saudi capital market authority Dr. Abdulrahman A. Al-Tuwaijri, and Chairman of Emaar Properties Mohammed Al Abbar.

== Personal life ==
She is married to a German, Marco Vogel, with whom she has one son.
