= Financial Regulatory Authority (Egypt) =

Financial Regulatory authority in Egypt

- الهيئه العامة للرقابة المالية

Agency overview
- Formed: July 2009
- Superseding agency: Capital Market Authority
- Jurisdiction: Egypt
- Headquarters: Smart Village, 6th of October, Egypt
- Agency executive: Dr. Mohamed Farid Saleh, Chairman
- Website: fra.gov.eg

The Financial Regulatory Authority (FRA, Egyptian Arabic: الهيئة العامة للرقابة المالية) is a financial regulatory authority that regulates the financial service industry in Egypt. It is an Egyptian Government integrated agency that supervises all non-banking financial transactions and markets including capital markets, derivative markets, commodities, insurance, mortgage finance, financial leasing and factoring.

== History ==
With the passing of Law no. 10, 2009, issued on February 25, 2009, the agency was established and became operationally effective on July 1, 2009. It replaced three major regulating authorities: the Capital Market Authority, the Insurance Supervisory Authority, and the Mortgage Finance Authority. This unification was intended to foster Egypt's financial sector.

Establishing the new authority is part of at a series of reforms aimed to strengthen the stability and security of the non-banking financial sector in Egypt and its interoperability with the banking sector. This move came during the 2008 financial crisis, which highlighted the need for integrity and transparency in financial markets.

Ashraf El-Sharkawy headed the authority after the January 2011 uprising.

The agency was known as the Egyptian Financial Supervisory Authority (EFSA) in English until November 2017 when it was rebranded in English only as the Financial Regulatory Authority.

== Responsibilities and structure ==
The Financial Regulatory Authority (FRA) regulates all non-bank financial transactions and markets including importantly capital markets, derivative markets on financial assets and commodities, insurance contracts and services, mortgage finance, financial leasing, factoring, and securitization.

The agency is an ordinary member of the International Organization of Securities Commissions (IOSCO). Both Cairo and Alexandria Stock Exchanges (CASE), as well as Misr Company for Central Clearing, Depository & Registry (MCDR), have a membership of the IOSCO too, but they are affiliate members.

The headquarters is located in Smart Village.

== See also ==
- Securities commission
- Economy of Egypt
- List of financial supervisory authorities by country
