= Nádine =

South African pop singer

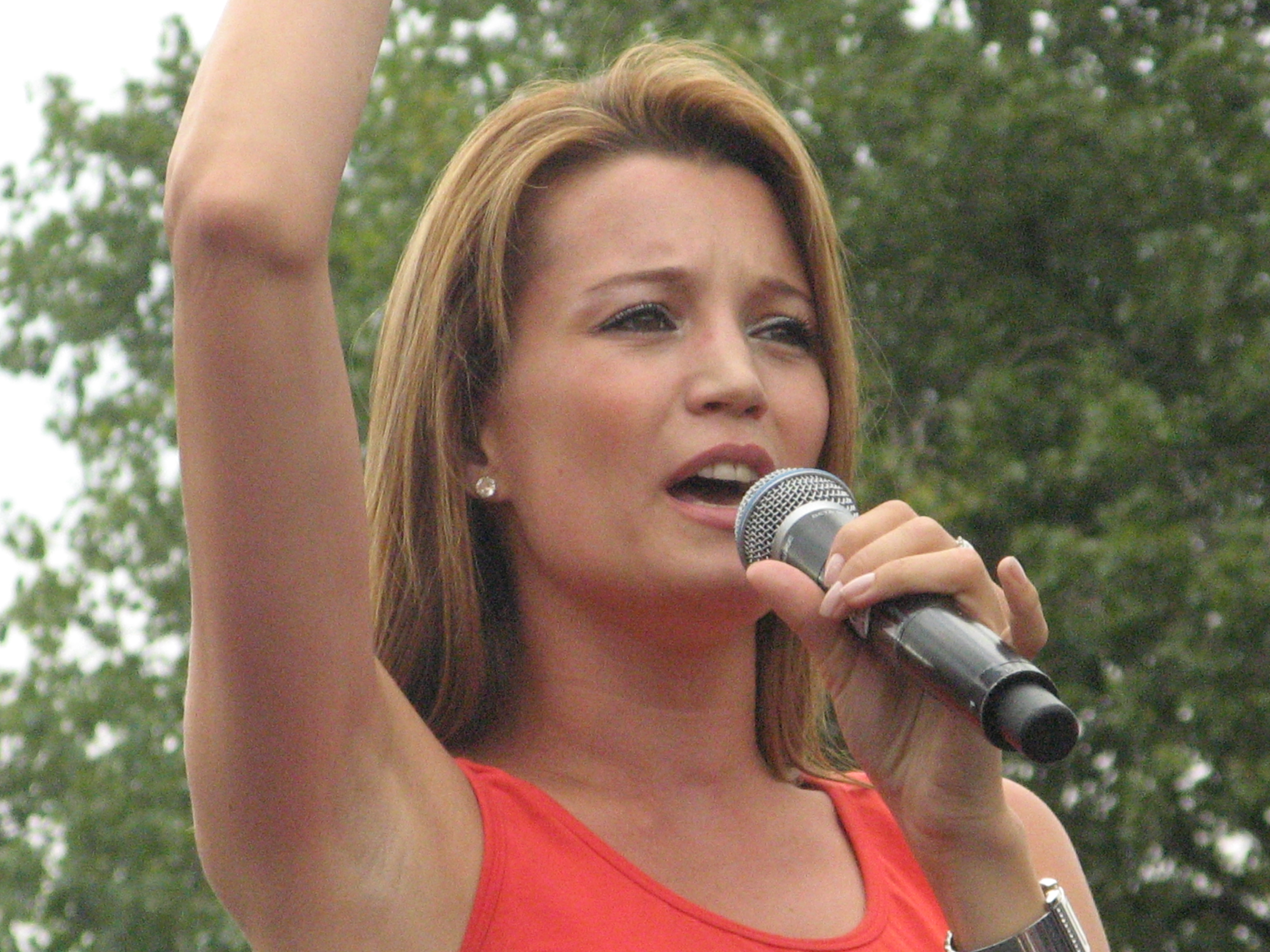
- Nádine in 2009

Background information
- Born: Nádine Hoffeldt; 28 February 1982 (age 44); Durban, South Africa
- Origin: South Africa
- Genre: Pop
- Occupation: Singer
- Years active: 1996–present
- Labels: EMI, King Entertainment, Universal Music, Europe Africa Music
- Website: nadine.net

Nádine Hoffeldt (born 28 February 1982) is a South African Afrikaans pop singer, best known for the hit song "Kaapse Draai". She has also recorded a number of songs in English.

== Life and career ==
Nádine was born in Durban, starting her career as a teenager in 1996, she has released twelve albums and two DVDs. In 1997 she toured South Africa with Dutch singer Jan Smit, when her then manager Ian Bossert brought him to the country. She also performed at the "Two Nations" concert in 1997, along with the Spice Girls and Billy Ocean, for an audience that included Nelson Mandela and Prince Charles.

Nádine released her seventh solo album, Mense soos jy, in September 2005. Her Nádine 10 Years Live was nominated for Best DVD in the 2006 South African Music Awards (SAMA). To date, each of Nádine's albums has produced a successful song, with the latest being "Skildery".

Nádine released her eighth album, As Jy Wonder, produced by international songwriter and producer Steve Taylor.

Nádine has recorded a number of hit songs, including "Dankie liewe Ouma", "Hoor hoe klop my hart", "Kom dans met my", "Latina", "’n Meisiekind wil ek graag bly", "Die Hemel Brand", "Alweer Iemand Anders", "Afrika Spore" and "Viva la Vida".

In 2010, she released her album This Time I Know, containing the singles "This Time I Know It's For Real" and "Made Up My Mind", the latter being an English language cover of "Delete" by Younha. Her song "I Can Have You" was covered in Korean by f(x), who titled it "Mr. Boogie".

In 2015 she began to present the Afrikaans music game show Musiek Roulette produced by Johan Stemmet, presenter of its sister-show Noot vir Noot. Musiek Roulette is currently airing season 6.

== Discography ==
- 1996: Krappies & Krefies
- 1997: Nádine
- 1999: You & I
- 2000: 44 Jongste Gunstelinge
- 2001: Simply Me!
- 2003: Greatest Hits: 1996-2003
- 2004: Mense Soos Jy
- 2006: Mense Soos Jy (Rerelease with 10 Years Live DVD)
- 2007: as jy wonder...
- 2008: This Time I Know
- 2009: Grootste Afrikaanse Treffers
- 2010: Live in Europe
- 2011: Eindeloos
- 2012: Christmas in South Africa
- 2014: Skildery
- 2024: Retro Remakes

== Singles ==
Year	Song	Album
1996	Krappies & Krefies	Krappies en Krefies
1996	Een Twee Drie	Krappies en Krefies
1997	'n Meisiekind Wil Ek Graag Bly	Nádine
1997	Hoor Hoe Klop My Hart	Nádine
1997	Parstyd In Die Wynland	Nádine
1997	Song For The World	Nádine
1999	Kom Dans Met My	You & I
1999	Dankie Liewe Ouma	You & I
1999	You & I	You & I
2000	Suikerbossie	44 Jongste Gunstelinge
2000	God Bless The Child	44 Jongste Gunstelinge
2001	Kaapse Draai	Simply Me!
2001	Latina	Simply Me!
2005	Koe-Ma-Doe	Mense Soos Jy
2005	Tiekiedraai	Mense Soos Jy
2005	Hikahajahô	Mense Soos Jy
2005	Queen of Hearts	Country Tuis
2007	Ierêro	As Jy Wonder
2007	As Jy Wonder	As Jy Wonder
2007	Stuur My Jou Kombers	As Jy Wonder
2007	Die Hemel Brand	As Jy Wonder
2008	This Time I Know It's For Real	This Time I Know
2008	Made Up My Mind	This Time I Know
2011	Eindeloos	Eindeloos
2011	Ek Haal Weer Asem	Eindeloos
2011	Rooi Roos (duet met Gerhard Steyn)	Eindeloos
2012	Lied Van My Hart (duet met Steve Hofmeyr)	Single
2012	Light In The Sky	Christmas in South Africa
2012	Falling In Love At Christmas	Christmas in South Africa
2014	Skildery	Skildery
2014	Tyd	Skildery
2020	Kom Maar In	Single
2022	Liefde Sonder 'n Maar	Single
2023	Elevated Love	Single
2025	Bly	Single
