= Nadiashda Galli-Shohat =

Russian and American physicist (1879–1948)

Nadiashda, Nadezhda or Nadejda Galli-Shohat (1879 – March 6, 1948) was a Russian physicist. Born Nadezhda Vasiliyevna Kokaoulina (Russian: Надежда Васильевна Кокаулина) in Siberia, she graduated from the Women's University of Petrograd in 1903, joined the Bolshevik Party after the 1905 Russian Revolution, and took the name Galli upon marrying her first husband. She received her doctorate from Göttingen in 1914 and worked in the Imperial and Soviet Russia until she, together with her second husband James Alexander Shohat, emigrated to the United States in 1923., where she worked at varuious universities and colleges. She was elected a Fellow of the American Physical Society in 1931.

== Biography ==
Nadezhda Vasilyevna Kokaoulina was born in Bodaybo, Siberia, Russian Empire, in 1879. She graduated from the Bestuzhev Courses (women's college of Petrograd) in 1903, joined the Bolshevik Party after the 1905 Russian Revolution.

She received her doctorate (thesis: Das optische Verhalten dünner Metallschichten) from Göttingen in 1914. She worked at the Yekaterinburg Meteorological Observatory from 1915 to 1917, from 1917 to 1920 she was professor at the physics department, Ural Mining University, from 1920 to 1921 she was professor and chair of the physics department at Ural Federal University, after which she worked at the University of Petrograd's State Optical Institute.

She took the surname Galli upon marrying her first husband.

Together with her second husband James Alexander Shohat (then Yakov Aleksandrovich Shohat, professor of higher mathematics of the Ural Mining University; married in 1922), she emigrated to the United States in 1923. She taught physics at the University of Michigan, Mount Holyoke, Rockford College, Bryn Mawr, and the University of Pennsylvania.

Shohats acquired the American citizenship in 1929.

She was elected a fellow of the American Physical Society in 1931.

Nedezhda Galli was also known for a biography of her nephew, the composer Dmitri Shostakovich, coauthored by her and Victor Seroff. Titled Dmitri Shostakovich: The Life and Background of a Soviet Composer, it was published by Alfred A. Knopf in 1943.

Galli-Shohat died on March 6, 1948, at the Graduate Hospital in Philadelphia.
