= Nada (given name) =

Nada is a feminine given name found with the etymology of 'hope' in South Slavic-speaking countries of Bosnia and Herzegovina, Croatia, Slovenia and Serbia, and the etymology of 'dew' in Arabic-speaking countries, (ندى [ˈnædæ]).

In Croatia, the name Nada was the second most common feminine given name between 1950 and 1959.

Notable people with the name include:

- Nada (South Korean musician) (born 1991), South Korean rapper, singer, dancer and model
- Nada Abbas (born 2000), Egyptian squash player
- Nada Abumrad, Lebanese-American scientist
- Nada al-Ahdal (born 2003), Yemeni human rights activist
- Nada al-Nashif, Jordanian public servant
- Nada Alic (born 1986), Croatian-Canadian writer
- Nada Aljeraiwi (born 1985), Kuwaiti cyclist
- Nada Bakri, Lebanese-American journalist
- Nada Bashir (born 1995), British journalist
- Nada Birko (1931–2020), Yugoslav cross-country skier
- Nada Boustani Khoury (born 1983), Lebanese politician
- Nada Cella (1971–1996), Italian murder victim
- Nada Cristofoli (born 1971), Italian cyclist
- Nada Ćurčija Prodanović (1923–1992), Serbian translator, children's author and piano teacher
- Nada Daabousová (born 1997), Slovak synchronized swimmer
- Nada Dimić (1923–1942), Yugoslav war hero
- Nada Eissa (born 1967), American economist
- Nada El Hage, Lebanese poet, writer, and journalist
- Nada Gačešić-Livaković (born 1951), Croatian actress
- Nada Golmie, American computer scientist and engineer
- Nada Gordon (born 1964), American poet
- Nada Hafez (born 1997), Egyptian sabre fencer
- Nada Haffadh, Bahraini politician
- Nada Ayman Ibrahim (born 1999), Egyptian artistic gymnast
- Nada Inada (1929–2013), pen-name of Japanese psychiatrist, writer and literary critic
- Nada Jabado, Canadian physician, professor, and researcher
- Nada Kakabadse, British academic
- Nada Kamel (born 1990), Egyptian archer
- Nada Kawar (born 1975), Jordanian athlete
- Nada Klaić (1920–1988), Croatian historian
- Nada Kostić (born 1956), Serbian medical doctor, academic, and politician
- Nada Kotlušek (born 1934), Slovenian athlete
- Nada Koussa (born 1998), Lebanese beauty pageant titleholder
- Nada Lavrač (born 1953), Slovenian computer scientist
- Nada Ludvig-Pečar (1929–2008), Bosnian composer
- Nada Malanima (born 1953), Italian singer
- Nada Mali (born 1979), Slovenian canoeist
- Nada Mamula (1927–2001), Serbian-Bosnian singer
- Nada Mandić (born 1969), Serbian politician
- Nada Martinović (born 1967), Serbian-American educator, conductor and researcher
- Nada Matić (born 1984), Serbian table tennis player
- Nada Meawad (born 1998), Egyptian volleyball player
- Nada Mezni Hafaiedh (born 1984), Tunisian film director
- Nada Miletić (1925–2002), Bosnian medievalist, art historian and archaeologist
- Nada Milošević-Đorđević (1934–2021), Serbian historian
- Nada Mourtada-Sabbah, Emeriti secretary general of the University Leadership Council
- Nada Murganić (born 1958), Croatian politician
- Nada Naumović (1922–1941), Serbian student activist and a People's Hero of Yugoslavia
- Nada Naumović (1922–1941), Serbian student activist
- Nada Obrić (born 1948), Bosnian Serb singer
- Nada Prlja (born 1971), Macedonian artist
- Nada Nadim Prouty (born c. 1970), Lebanese intelligence professional
- Nada Rocco (born 1947), Croatian actress
- Nada Saafan (born 1996), Egyptian synchronized swimmer
- Nada Sanders, American professor
- Nada Šargin (born 1977), Serbian actress
- Nada Sehnaoui (born 1958), Lebanese visual artist and political activist
- Nada Ševo (born 1978), Serbian politician
- Nada Shabout (born 1962), Iraqi-American art historian
- Nada Spasić (born 1934), Yugoslav gymnast
- Nada Stotland (born 1943), American psychiatrist
- Nada Tešanović (born 1952), Bosnian Croat politician
- Nada Thabet, Egyptian disability rights advocate
- Nada Tončić (1909–1998), Croatian opera singer
- Nada Topčagić (born 1953), Bosnian-Serbian folk singer
- Nada Vilotijević (born 1953), Serbian professor and author

== See also ==
- Hope (given name)
- Nadia
- Nadja (given name)
- Nađa
