= 2018 Upper Austria Ladies Linz – Doubles =

Doubles
- 2018 Upper Austria Ladies Linz

Final
- Champions: (Belgium) Kirsten Flipkens (Sweden) Johanna Larsson
- Runners-up: (United States) Raquel Atawo (Germany) Anna-Lena Grönefeld
- Score: 4–6, 6–4, [10–5]

Details
- Draw: 14
- Seeds: 4

Events
| Singles | Doubles |
- Linz Open

Kiki Bertens and Johanna Larsson were the defending champions, but Bertens chose not to participate. Larsson played alongside Kirsten Flipkens and successfully retained the title, defeating Raquel Atawo and Anna-Lena Grönefeld in the final, 4–6, 6–4, [10–5].

== Seeds ==
1. (United States) Raquel Atawo / (Germany) Anna-Lena Grönefeld (final)
2. (Ukraine) Lyudmyla Kichenok / (Slovenia) Katarina Srebotnik (semifinals)
3. (Belgium) Kirsten Flipkens / (Sweden) Johanna Larsson (champions)
4. (Romania) Irina Bara / (Switzerland) Xenia Knoll (semifinals)

== Draw ==
Key

- Q = Qualifier
- WC = Wild card
- LL = Lucky loser
- Alt = Alternate
- ITF = ITF entry
- PR = Protected ranking
- SR = Special ranking
- SE = Special exempt
- JE = Junior exempt
- JR = Junior Accelerator Programme entrant
- CO = College Accelerator Programme entrant
- NG = Next Gen Accelerator Program entrant
- w/o = Walkover
- r = Retired
- d = Defaulted

=== Draw ===
First round
(Spain) G García Pérez (Netherlands) A Rus | 2 | 3
(Russia) A Blinkova (Russia) N Vikhlyantseva | 6 | 6
4 | (Romania) I Bara (Switzerland) X Knoll | 6 | 4 | [10]
(Russia) A Panova (Kazakhstan) G Voskoboeva | 3 | 6 | [6]
WC | (Austria) M Österreicher (Austria) N Ramskogler | 0 | 2
WC | (Austria) M Klaffner (Slovakia) V Kužmová | 6 | 6
(Poland) P Kania (Sweden) C Lister | 2 | 4
(Switzerland) B Bencic (Austria) B Haas | 6 | 6
(Belarus) V Lapko (Luxembourg) M Minella
3 | (Belgium) K Flipkens (Sweden) J Larsson | w/o
(Chinese Taipei) P-h Chen (Chinese Taipei) F-h Wu | 5 | 3
(Germany) N Geuer (Slovakia) C Škamlová | 7 | 6

Quarterfinals
1 | (United States) R Atawo (Germany) A-L Grönefeld | 6 | 6
(Russia) A Blinkova (Russia) N Vikhlyantseva | 3 | 1
4 | (Romania) I Bara (Switzerland) X Knoll | 6 | 4 | [10]
WC | (Austria) M Klaffner (Slovakia) V Kužmová | 4 | 6 | [8]
(Switzerland) B Bencic (Austria) B Haas | 4 | 4
3 | (Belgium) K Flipkens (Sweden) J Larsson | 6 | 6
(Germany) N Geuer (Slovakia) C Škamlová | 3 | 6^{2}
2 | (Ukraine) L Kichenok (Slovenia) K Srebotnik | 6 | 7^{7}

Semifinals
1 | (United States) R Atawo (Germany) A-L Grönefeld | 6 | 6
4 | (Romania) I Bara (Switzerland) X Knoll | 3 | 3
3 | (Belgium) K Flipkens (Sweden) J Larsson | 6 | 6
2 | (Ukraine) L Kichenok (Slovenia) K Srebotnik | 2 | 2

Final
1 | (United States) R Atawo (Germany) A-L Grönefeld | 6 | 4 | [5]
3 | (Belgium) K Flipkens (Sweden) J Larsson | 4 | 6 | [10]
