= Nadja Tesich =

Serbian-American writer, filmmaker, actress and activist

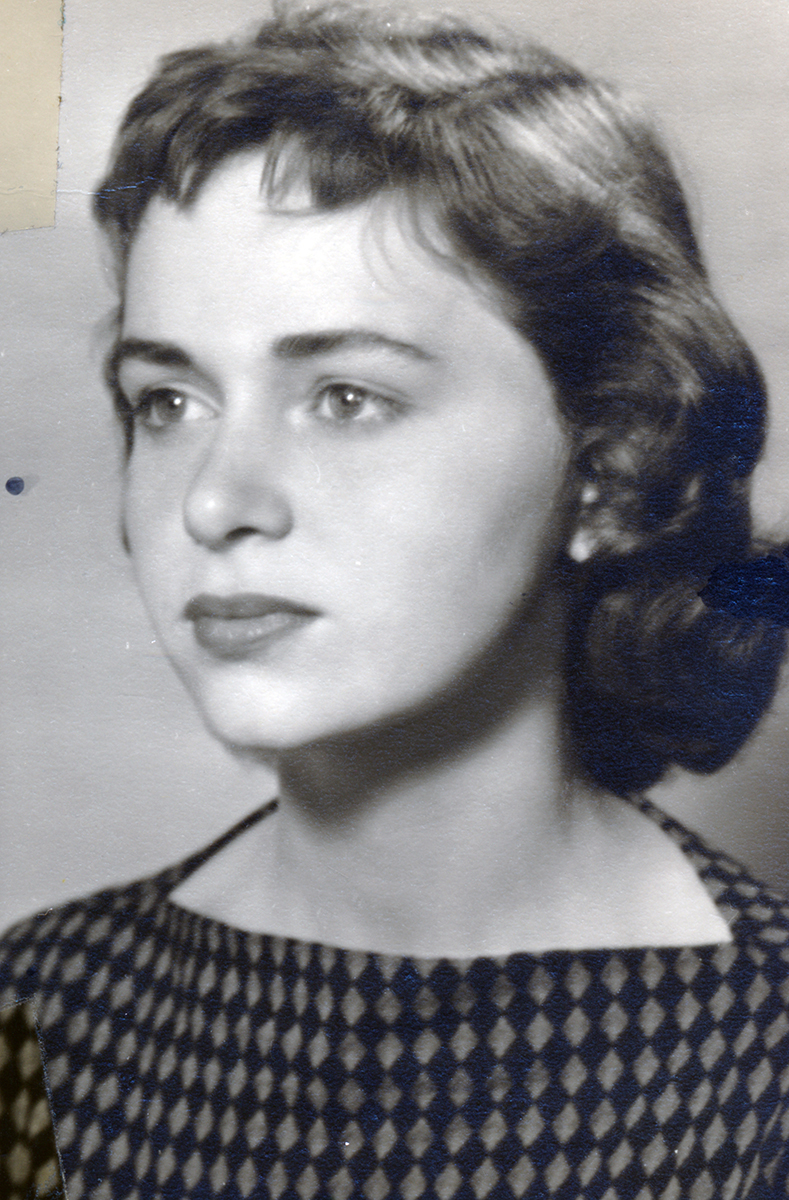
- Nadja Tesich, 1950s.
- Born: Nadežda Tešić; June 8, 1939; Užice, Yugoslavia
- Died: February 20, 2014 (aged 74); New York City
- Education: Indiana University, University of Wisconsin, Sorbonne University, New York University
- Occupations: Filmmaker, Actor, Writer, Teacher, Activist
- Spouse: Dean Savage
- Children: Stefan Savage
- Writing career
- Notable work: Nadja à Paris After the Revolution Film for My Son
- Notable awards: MacDowell Fellowship, Yaddo Fellowship, Blue Mountain Center Residence, National Endowment for the Arts Literature Fellowship, New York Foundation for the Arts Award for Fiction, Screenwriter's Award, Corporation for Public Broadcasting

Nadja Tesich (June 8, 1939 – February 20, 2014) was a writer, actor and activist. She was born in Yugoslavia and reared in East Chicago, Indiana. Best known for her starring role in Éric Rohmer's early film Nadja à Paris (1964), she was the author of the play After the Revolution (1980), followed by the novels Shadow Partisan, (1996), Native Land (1999) and Far From Vietnam (2012) and the literary memoir To Die in Chicago (2010). She was the writer and director of Film for my Son (1975) and wrote, acted or worked on numerous films, including Four Friends (1981), I Am the Cheese (1983) and The Love Lesson (1996). Her brother was Steve Tesich, the playwright, novelist and Academy Award-winning screenwriter of Breaking Away and other films. She taught film at Brooklyn College and was a lifelong political activist for workers and the oppressed people of the world.

== Early life ==
Nadja Tesich, aka Nađa, was born Nadežda Tešić to Gospava Bulaić and Radiša Tešić in Yugoslavia (now Serbia) in 1939. In 1954, she immigrated to the United States with her mother and brother, Steve Tesich, to rejoin her father—who had settled in East Chicago, Indiana, in 1951. Nadja Tesich graduated early from Roosevelt High School in Gary, Indiana. She went on to study French Literature and received her B.A. from Indiana University in Bloomington, Illinois, in 1960. The following year, she completed a Certificat de langue française from the Faculté des lettres at the Sorbonne in Paris. Tesich completed her master's degree in French literature from the University of Wisconsin, Madison, in 1962, studying with French-American literary scholar, Germaine Brée. Tesich worked as a teaching assistant and during the summer she taught French to Peace Corps volunteers.

== Paris ==
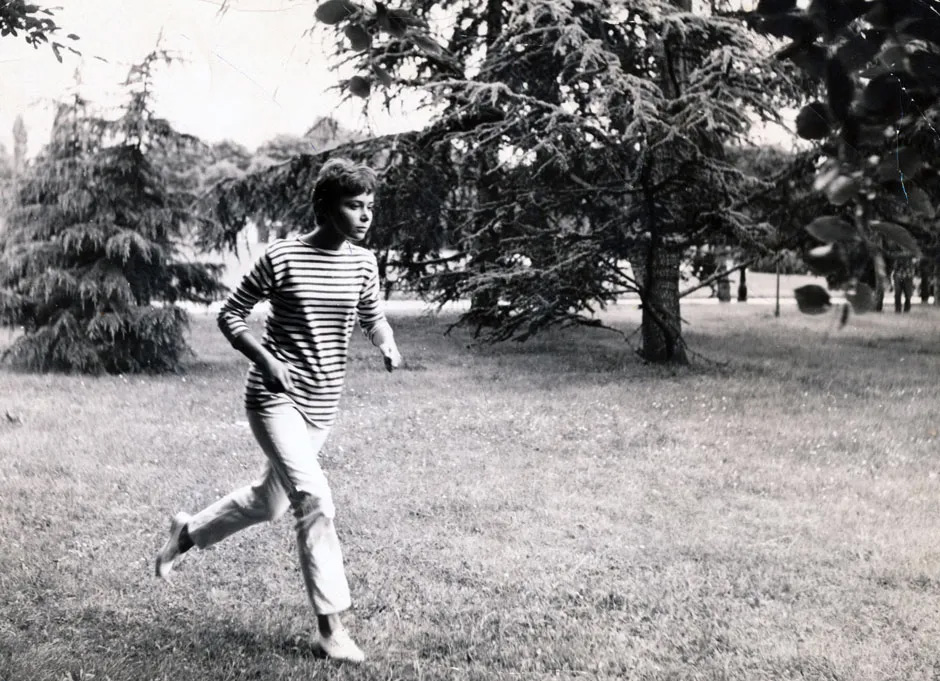
Nadja Tesich running in the park of the Cité Universitaire in the short film, "Nadja à Paris," directed by Éric Rohmer, Paris, 1964

In the Fall of 1962, Tesich returned to Paris to continue her language studies—this time in Russian—at l'École des langues orientales. She received her Certificat de langue russe from l'École des langues orientales vivantes (now called INALCO) in 1964. In between, in 1963, she met the filmmaker Éric Rohmer, who was planning to make a documentary film on students living at the Cité internationale universitaire de Paris. Rohmer had also been thinking of making a film adaptation of André Breton's novel Nadja when he met Nadja Tesich, who shared his interest in the novel and had adopted that spelling for her name.

Rohmer's iconic 1964 film Nadja à Paris is composed around Nadja Tesich, who contributed to the script. In it, cinematographer Néstor Almendros's innovative camerawork follows her throughout the city. This was Almendros's first film work, and through it he and Tesich became lifelong friends. In addition to their interest in film, they shared a history with Cuba. The nineteen-year-old Jean-Pierre Léaud also made an appearance in the film. He too would remain a lifelong friend, along with Rohmer, who would continue to nurture Tesich's professional work in films. The combination of a young woman's narrative, original camerawork and Rohmer's directorial vision made the film popular internationally. Produced by Barbet Schroeder, it was centered around Tesich's personality and her interactions with the city of Paris.

After filming Nadja à Paris, Tesich received an offer to teach French at Douglass College, Rutgers University. Prior to her departure for New York, she took a vacation hitchhiking throughout Europe and into Yugoslavia. On the boat back to the United States, Tesich met Ellen Shumsky, the lesbian feminist photographer and activist. In New York, they agreed to share an apartment in the West Village. This began Tesich's long-standing support of LGBTQ rights in New York City. After several years teaching at Douglass (1964–67), Tesich returned to Paris, where she enrolled again at l'École des langues orientales, this time to study Chinese. She continued her studies from 1967–69; at the time, the Cultural Revolution was still idealized as a youth movement.

The summer of 1966, Tesich and Ellen Shumsky traveled to the South of France, visiting Shumsky's sister Thelma, and Thelma's husband, the British photographer Harold Chapman, in Saint-Guiraud, a village in L' Hérault. For very little money, Tesich bought a rundown house, a former sheep's fold, in nearby Lacoste. She would continue to spend her summers there until 2008, selling it in 2012. There, she would host friends and artists, many of whom also bought homes in the region, including Shumsky.

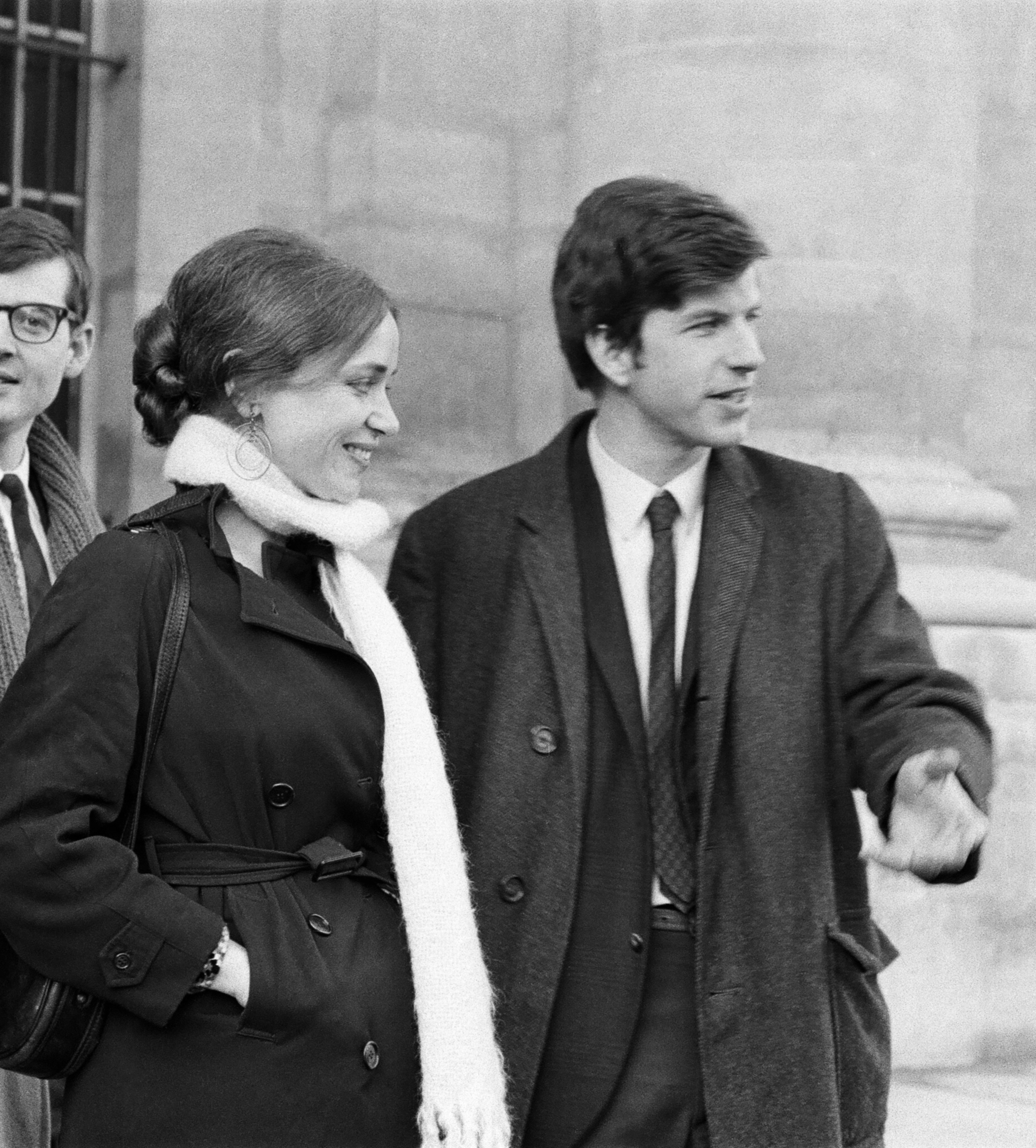
Nadja Tesich and Dean Savage on their wedding day, January 11, 1969. Photograph by Roberto Ballabeni, Paris.

Back in Paris in 1967, Tesich worked as script supervisor on the film short Les Passes, directed by Bernard Eisenschitz. She began to attend meetings of the anti-Vietnam War group, the Paris American Committee to Stop War, where she met Dean Savage, an American sociology student researching his dissertation. Both were political activists, and in October 1967, Tesich and Savage marched from the Place de la République to the Bastille in support of North Vietnam. This protest included approximately 300 North Vietnamese in Viet Cong-style black pajama uniforms, followed by 100 or so Americans and thousands of French Communist Party members. In February of the following year, they were part of a Trotskyist event with the Jeunesse communiste révolutionnaire, for which they traveled to Berlin to march behind the political activist Rudi Dutschke. Savage and Tesich participated separately in the Paris student protests of May 1968. Around this time, Tesich moved in with Savage, sharing his flat on the rue de la Huchette. In the summer of 1968, she traveled for the first time to Cuba, in sympathy with the workers of the Revolution. She would return to Cuba several times later in her life, and shared that interest with her friend, the cinematographer Néstor Almendros, who was born in Spain, but spent many years in Havana.

On January 11, 1969, Dean Savage and Nadja Tesich were married at the town hall in the 5th Arrondissement of Paris. In June 1969, they celebrated the birth of their son, Stefan Savage, who was born at the American Hospital in Paris. In 1971, Savage took a teaching position in the Sociology department at Queens College, New York, and the family moved to the Upper West Side of Manhattan.

== New York ==
=== Film ===
Upon the family's return to New York in 1971, Tesich enrolled in NYU's Film and TV Graduate Institute, receiving her MFA in 1973. While attending school, she worked on several films with other filmmakers, serving as cinematographer for House, a documentary by Michael Kravitz, in 1972; script consultant for several shorts by Kravitz in 1974; production assistant for Corners of a Circle by Bill Daughton in 1975; and assistant director of It's Not a One Person Thing by Sally Heckel in 1975.

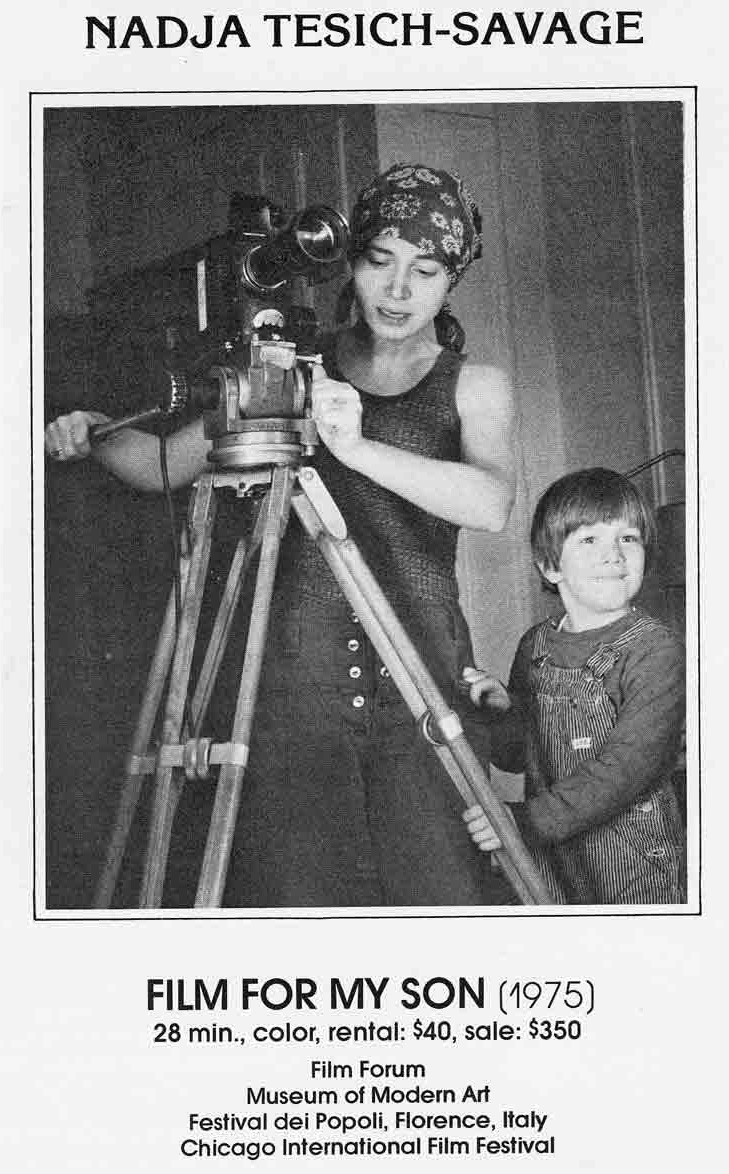
Detail from a flyer for the 1975 short film, 'Film for My Son,' featuring Nadja Tesich and Stefan Savage

In 1972, Tesich wrote, directed and edited Words, a dramatic short film about social distance. It was shown at Carnegie Hall Cinema in 1975. That same year, she released Film For My Son, which she produced, directed, wrote and edited, about the contrasting real and imaginary life of a four year old boy and the memory of another childhood in a wartime country. Film For My Son won several awards, and was screened at The Museum of Modern Art, New York, Film Forum, Cinėmathèque, Paris, International Women's Film Festival, Washington, D.C., and other international venues. Film Forum Executive Director Karen Cooper called it "a film which encompasses a paradox: made to record the moment, while ruminating upon the illusive nature of our most previous experiences." It was telecast on WNET in New York, WTTW in Chicago and in Yugoslavia.

After Film For My Son, Tesich participated in Film Directing Workshops with the acting coach and teacher Alice Spivak and continued to work in commercial films. For example, she was a production assistant on two 1977 films by Patricia Maxam and a script supervisor on the short film Friends by Louise Fleming in 1979. In 1978, Tesich worked as the assistant to director Éric Rohmer on the feature film Perceval, shot in Paris by Néstor Almendros. In 1980, she worked in the art department for Peter Yates' Eyewitness, shot in New York City and written by her brother Steve Tesich. In 1982, she mixed sound and worked on the crew of Robert Jiras' 1983 film, I Am the Cheese, shot in Vermont. And in 1994, she played herself staging her own performance piece, "On Seduction," in Sharon Greytak's 1996 feature film, The Love Lesson.

In 1980, Tesich was hired as assistant to the producer Julia Miles on the 1981 feature film Four Friends, written by Steve Tesich and directed by Arthur Penn in Chicago. Nadja Tesich and Miles had become friends through the Women's Project, a groundbreaking organization founded by Miles that addressed gender inequity in the theater. Between 1978 and 1995, Tesich participated in many productions at the Women's Project, which was sponsored by the director and acting teacher Wynn Handman at the American Place Theater, where Tesich had mounted her 1979 play After the Revolution in 1980. After the Revolution was optioned by PBS and received a Screenwriter's Award from the Corporation for Public Broadcasting for adaptation as a teleplay. In addition to this play, Tesich wrote and mounted Immigrant Passions (1982), Harvest (1984), What Remained (1986) and Lovers, Love (1987) at the American Place Theatre.

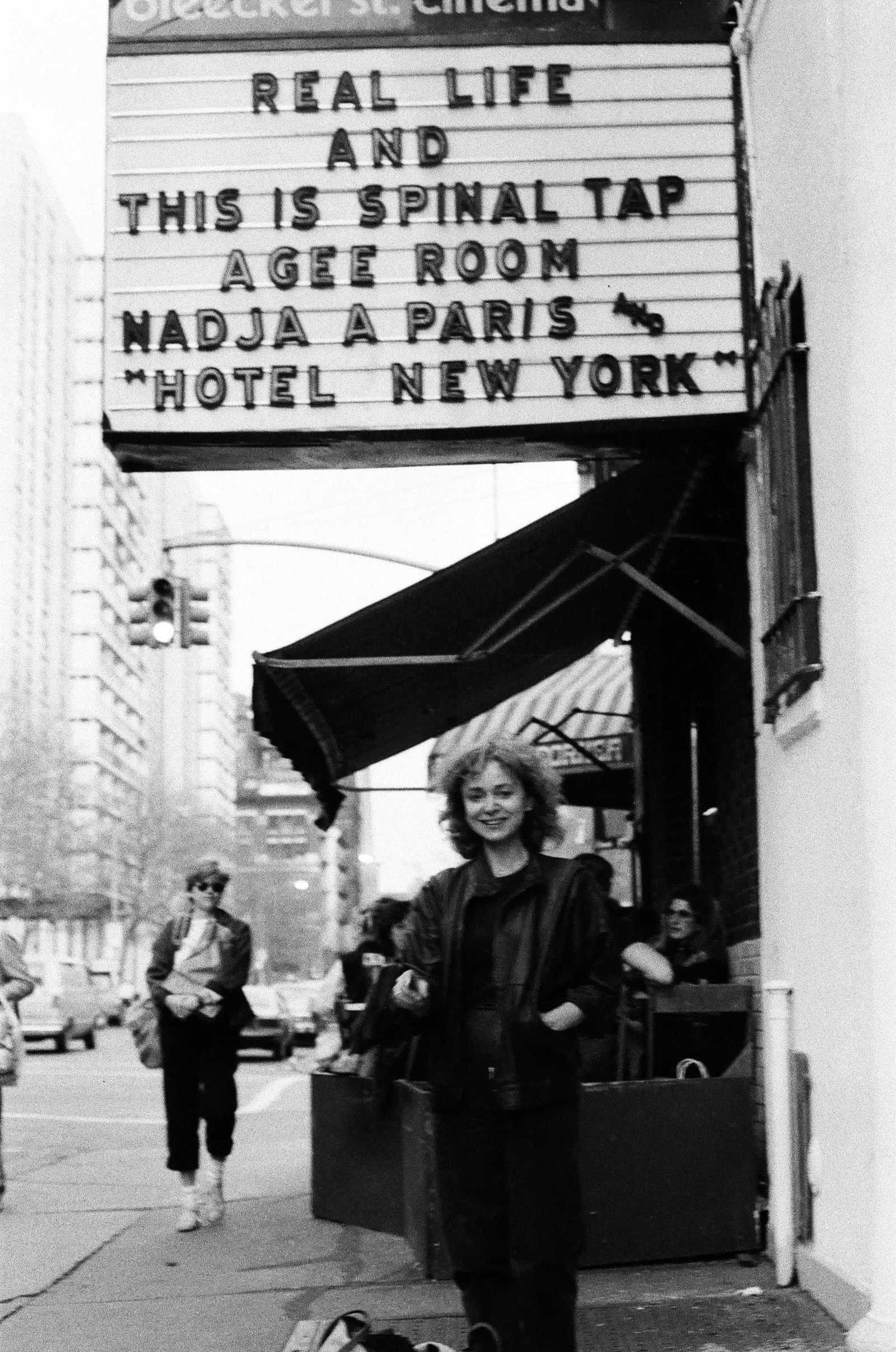
Nadja Tesich at the Bleecker Street Cinema's showing of Nadja à Paris, New York City, 1984

=== Academia ===
With her background in the Nouvelle Vague, a wide range of experience within the film and theater industries and a close relationship to her brother Steve Tesich, whose work in theater, television and film was becoming increasingly prominent, Tesich accepted a teaching position at Brooklyn College in 1977. From 1977–78, she was an adjunct assistant professor in the Film department, and by 1983, she was promoted to Assistant Associate Professor of Film with tenure. She held this position until 1990. Nevertheless, she never considered herself an academic, instead presenting herself as a film professional sharing her experience with her students. Her specialty was screenwriting, and her focus was always on helping students with their writing. Although she did not teach classes on the Nouvelle Vague, Tesich was associated with Éric Rohmer and other members of the French New Wave and she often spoke of her time in Paris. She looked back on it as a golden age for French cinema, and through those memories students felt connected to an important postwar film movement.

=== Writing ===
In 1979, Tesich began to receive regular awards, grants and residencies in order to focus on her writing, penning many screenplays, plays, articles, interviews and short stories. In addition to publishing short works in literary journals like Guernica and the Kenyon Review, and film writing in venues like Film Comment, she published three semi-autobiographical novels. Shadow Partisan (1996) is a bildungsroman set in post-WWII Yugoslavia, presenting a detailed portrait of an Eastern European village still impacted by war in the first throes of Communism. Her 1999 follow-up, Native Land, is the narrative of a middle-aged wife and mother who returns to her homeland and is overwhelmed by the need to reconcile her past and present. Her third novel, Far From Vietnam (2012), titled after the Chris Marker film of 1967, tells the story of an American student living in Paris in the mid-1960s, who discovers herself as a woman and a political activist. Tesich also penned a literary memoir, To Die in Chicago (2010), which brought to life the immigrant experience in East Chicago, as a young girl and her family confront the reality of living the American dream. On one hand, Tesich was interested in depicting people displaced from their homeland and inhabiting new cultures and languages. On the other, she was concerned with the musical nature of her own prose, emphasizing the sound of the words as much as the meaning.

== Yugoslav Wars ==
When war erupted around Yugoslavia in 1990, Tesich took it as a personal catastrophe. She identified as Yugoslavian, although she was of Serbian nationality. In the conflicts, she supported Slobodan Milošević, and reviled Western European and American intervention. She wrote extensively in defense of her homeland on Srpska Mreža, Serbian Network, a site focused on civil wars in the former Yugoslavia, and never got over the fact that the Balkan Wars ended in the fragmentation of a once-sovereign socialist country. At meetings, teach-ins and rallies on the issue, Tesich was a driving force. An obsession with these and other world events in which imperial Western interests squashed local or socialist causes would become a passionate source of protest and despair for the rest of her life.

Tesich's brother, Steve Tesich, died of a heart attack at age 53 in Nova Scotia, Canada, in 1996. Coupled with the conflicts around Yugoslavia, her brother's death was a devastation for her.

== Later years ==
In the last years of her life, Tesich returned to the subject of her time in Paris and her central role in Rohmer's film, Nadja à Paris. She revisited some of her early writings, and with the editorial assistance of her friend Lucy McKeon, would edit and complete the essay "Nadja à Paris," which was published posthumously in 2015 in the New York Review of Books. Previously, Tesich and McKeon had collaborated on adapting the one-person dialogue, "On Seduction," which was published in Guernica on February 14, 2014, just one week before Tesich's death.

Nadja Tesich suffered from chronic systemic pain, including from arthritis, throughout the last decade of her life, during which Dean Savage and her sister in law, Rebecca Tesich, cared for her. She had a history of aneurysm and mini-strokes. On February 4, 2014, Nadja Tesich suffered a brain aneurysm at home and thereafter she died in the hospital, on February 20, 2014.

== Films Works ==
- Rohmer, Éric, Nadja a Paris, 1964. 13 minutes. Actor and scriptwriter.
- Tesich, Nadja, Words, 1975. 15 minutes. Writer, editor and director.
- Tesich, Nadja, Film for My Son, 1975. 27 minutes. Writer, editor, director and producer.

== Theater Works ==
- Tesich, Nadja, After the Revolution, 1980. Writer and director. Produced by The American Place Theatre.
- Tesich, Nadja, Immigrant Passions, 1982. Writer and director. Produced by The American Place Theatre.
- Tesich, Nadja, Harvest, 1984. Writer and director. Produced by The American Place Theatre.
- Tesich, Nadja, What Remained, 1986. Writer and director. Produced by The American Place Theatre.
- Tesich, Nadja, Lovers, Love, 1987. Writer and director. Produced by The American Place Theatre.

== Literary Works ==
- Tesich, Nadja (1996). Shadow Partisan. New York: New Rivers Press. ISBN 9780898231083.
- Tesich, Nadja (1999). Native Land. Havertown, PA: Brookline Books. ISBN 9781571290427.
- Tesich, Nadja (2012). Far from Vietnam. Bloomington, Indiana: iUniverse. ISBN 9781469794228.
- Tesich, Nadja (2010). To Die in Chicago. Bloomington, IN: iUniverse. ISBN 9781450233903.
