= 2018 Upper Austria Ladies Linz – Singles =

Singles
- 2018 Upper Austria Ladies Linz

Final
- Champion: (Italy) Camila Giorgi
- Runner-up: (Russia) Ekaterina Alexandrova
- Score: 6–3, 6–1

Details
- Draw: 32
- Seeds: 8

Events
Singles	Doubles
← 2017 ·	Linz Open	· 2019 →

Barbora Strýcová was the defending champion, but lost in the quarterfinals to Alison Van Uytvanck.

Camila Giorgi won the title, defeating Ekaterina Alexandrova in the final, 6–3, 6–1.

== Seeds ==
1. (Germany) Julia Görges (first round)
2. (Netherlands) Kiki Bertens (second round)
3. (Czech Republic) Barbora Strýcová (quarterfinals)
4. (Slovakia) Dominika Cibulková (withdrew)
5. (Italy) Camila Giorgi (champion)
6. (Russia) Anastasia Pavlyuchenkova (quarterfinals)
7. (Slovakia) Magdaléna Rybáriková (first round)
8. (Croatia) Donna Vekić (first round)
9. (Czech Republic) Kateřina Siniaková (first round)

== Draw ==
=== Key ===
- Q = Qualifier
- WC = Wild card
- LL = Lucky loser
- Alt = Alternate
- ITF = ITF entry
- PR = Protected ranking
- SR = Special ranking
- SE = Special exempt
- JE = Junior exempt
- JR = Junior Accelerator Programme entrant
- CO = College Accelerator Programme entrant
- NG = Next Gen Accelerator Program entrant
- w/o = Walkover
- r = Retired
- d = Defaulted

=== Finals ===
Semifinals
WC	(Germany) Andrea Petkovic	6	4	0
Q	(Russia) Ekaterina Alexandrova	0	6	6
(Belgium) Alison Van Uytvanck	3	4
5	(Italy) Camila Giorgi	6	6

Final
Q	(Russia) Ekaterina Alexandrova	3	1
5	(Italy) Camila Giorgi	6	6

=== Top half ===
First round
1	(Germany) J Görges	6	5	4
WC	(Germany) A Petkovic	1	7	6
Q	(Russia) A Blinkova	6	2	3
(Germany) T Maria	2	6	6
(France) K Mladenovic	6	6
WC	(United Kingdom) H Dart	3	4
(Hungary) T Babos	6	6
8	(Croatia) D Vekić	1	1
9	(Czech Republic) K Siniaková	5	0
Q	(Russia) E Alexandrova	7	6
(Sweden) J Larsson	6	4	6
(Switzerland) S Vögele	2	6	4
(Belarus) V Lapko	1	6	6
(Switzerland) B Bencic	6	1	0
(Slovakia) V Kužmová	5	5
6	(Russia) A Pavlyuchenkova	7	7

Second round
WC	(Germany) A Petkovic	6	6
(Germany) T Maria	1	3
(France) K Mladenovic	6	4	7
(Hungary) T Babos	4	6	5
Q	(Russia) E Alexandrova	3	6	6
(Sweden) J Larsson	6	1	1
(Belarus) V Lapko	7	6^{4}	3
6	(Russia) A Pavlyuchenkova	5	7^{7}	6

Quarterfinals
WC	(Germany) A Petkovic	6	6
(France) K Mladenovic	1	3
Q	(Russia) E Alexandrova	6	7
6	(Russia) A Pavlyuchenkova	3	5

Semifinals
WC	(Germany) A Petkovic	6	4	0
Q	(Russia) E Alexandrova	0	6	6

=== Bottom half ===
First round
7	(Slovakia) M Rybáriková	3	4
(Belgium) A Van Uytvanck	6	6
Q	(Slovakia) AK Schmiedlová	6	6
Q	(France) F Ferro	2	3
LL	(Czech Republic) Kr Plíšková	6	6
Q	(Greece) V Grammatikopoulou	4	2
(Belgium) K Flipkens	6^{4}	6^{5}
3	(Czech Republic) B Strýcová	7^{7}	7^{7}
5	(Italy) C Giorgi	6	7^{7}
(France) P Parmentier	3	6^{4}
(Romania) S Cîrstea	4	2
Q	(Switzerland) J Teichmann	6	6
PR	(Russia) M Gasparyan	6	0
(Puerto Rico) M Puig	2	0^{r}
WC	(Austria) B Haas	2	1
2	(Netherlands) K Bertens	6	6

Second round
(Belgium) A Van Uytvanck	1	7^{7}	7^{7}
Q	(Slovakia) AK Schmiedlová	6	6^{3}	6^{5}
LL	(Czech Republic) Kr Plíšková	0	1
3	(Czech Republic) B Strýcová	6	6
5	(Italy) C Giorgi	7^{7}	6
Q	(Switzerland) J Teichmann	6^{2}	3
PR	(Russia) M Gasparyan	7	2	7^{7}
2	(Netherlands) K Bertens	5	6	6^{3}

Quarterfinals
(Belgium) A Van Uytvanck	3	6	6
3	(Czech Republic) B Strýcová	6	4	4
5	(Italy) C Giorgi	6	3	6
PR	(Russia) M Gasparyan	3	6	2

Semifinals
(Belgium) A Van Uytvanck	3	4
5	(Italy) C Giorgi	6	6

== Qualifying ==
=== Seeds ===
1. (Slovakia) Anna Karolína Schmiedlová (qualified)
2. (Germany) Mona Barthel (first round)
3. (Germany) Carina Witthöft (first round)
4. (Switzerland) Viktorija Golubic (qualifying competition)
5. (Serbia) Olga Danilović (first round)
6. (Russia) Anna Blinkova (qualified)
7. (Czech Republic) Kristýna Plíšková (qualifying competition, lucky loser)
8. (Netherlands) Arantxa Rus (first round)
9. (France) Fiona Ferro (qualified)
10. (Russia) Natalia Vikhlyantseva (qualifying competition)
11. (Luxembourg) Mandy Minella (qualifying competition)
12. (Russia) Vitalia Diatchenko (qualifying competition)

=== Qualifiers ===
1. (Slovakia) Anna Karolína Schmiedlová
2. (Russia) Ekaterina Alexandrova
3. (Greece) Valentini Grammatikopoulou
4. (France) Fiona Ferro
5. (Switzerland) Jil Teichmann
6. (Russia) Anna Blinkova

=== Lucky loser ===
1. (Czech Republic) Kristýna Plíšková

=== Draw ===
==== First qualifier ====
First round
1	(Slovakia) Anna Karolína Schmiedlová	6	3	6
(Germany) Tamara Korpatsch	3	6	0
(Russia) Anna Kalinskaya	1	2
10	(Russia) Natalia Vikhlyantseva	6	6

Qualifying competition
1	(Slovakia) Anna Karolína Schmiedlová	6	6
10	(Russia) Natalia Vikhlyantseva	1	2

==== Second qualifier ====
First round
2	(Germany) Mona Barthel	2	1
(Russia) Ekaterina Alexandrova	6	6
WC	(Austria) Mavie Österreicher	3	1
11	(Luxembourg) Mandy Minella	6	6

Qualifying competition
(Russia) Ekaterina Alexandrova	6	6
11	(Luxembourg) Mandy Minella	1	0

==== Third qualifier ====
First round
3	(Germany) Carina Witthöft	7^{7}	2	3
(Greece) Valentini Grammatikopoulou	6^{2}	6	6
WC	(Austria) Melanie Klaffner	1	6^{4}
12	(Russia) Vitalia Diatchenko	6	7^{7}

Qualifying competition
(Greece) Valentini Grammatikopoulou	6	7
12	(Russia) Vitalia Diatchenko	2	5

==== Fourth qualifier ====
First round
4	(Switzerland) Viktorija Golubic	7^{7}	6^{3}	7^{7}
(Spain) Georgina García Pérez	6^{4}	7^{7}	6^{4}
WC	(Austria) Nadja Ramskogler	1	1
9	(France) Fiona Ferro	6	6

Qualifying competition
4	(Switzerland) Viktorija Golubic	4	6	3
9	(France) Fiona Ferro	6	3	6

==== Fifth qualifier ====
First round
5	(Serbia) Olga Danilović	3	6	1
(Czech Republic) Tereza Smitková	6	1	6
(Switzerland) Jil Teichmann	6^{8}	7^{8}	6
8	(Netherlands) Arantxa Rus	7^{10}	6^{6}	4

Qualifying competition
(Czech Republic) Tereza Smitková	4	6	3
(Switzerland) Jil Teichmann	6	1	6

==== Sixth qualifier ====
First round
6	(Russia) Anna Blinkova	6	3	6
(Germany) Antonia Lottner	4	6	4
(Romania) Irina Bara	4	3
7/WC	(Czech Republic) Kristýna Plíšková	6	6

Qualifying competition
6	(Russia) Anna Blinkova	6	6
7/WC	(Czech Republic) Kristýna Plíšková	1	2
