= Nadja (given name) =

Nadja is a female name, that is used predominantly throughout the Mediterranean region, and the Arab world. Its origins are in the Arabic languages. The Serbian and Montenegrin cognate is Nađa, and it is sometimes written the same.

Notable people with the name include:

- Nadja Abd el Farrag (born 1965), German television personality
- Nadja Auermann (born 1971), German model and actress
- Nadja Awad (born 1991), Swedish politician
- Nadja Becker (born 1978), German actress
- Nadja Benaissa (born 1982), German singer, member of No Angels
- Nadja Bender (born 1990), Danish fashion model
- Nadja Bergknecht, German swimmer
- Nadja Bernhard (born 1975), Austrian news presenter
- Nadja Brand (born 1975), South African film actor
- Nadja Breytenbach (born 1995), Namibian model and beauty pageant titleholder
- Nadja Drost, Canadian journalist
- Nadja Drygalla (born 1989), German rower
- Nadja Durbach, American professor of history
- Nadja Furrer (born 1998), Swiss footballer
- Nadja Franck (1867–1932), Finnish figure skater
- Nadja Halilbegovich (born 1979), Bosnian author, speaker and peace activist
- Nadja Hirsch (born 1978), German politician
- Nadja Holm (born 1997), Swedish singer
- Nadja Horwitz (born 1996), Chilean sailor
- Nadja Hüpscher (born 1972), Dutch actress and writer
- Nadja Natalie Isaksen (born 1995), Danish politician
- Nadja Kälin (born 2001), Swiss cross-country skier
- Nadja Kamer (born 1986), Swiss alpine skier
- Nadja Käther (born 1988), German track and field athlete
- Nadja Küchenmeister (born 1981), German poet and writer
- Nadja Malacrida, pen-name of Louisa Nadia Green (1895—1934), British poet
- Nadja Maleh (born 1972), Austrian actress
- Nadja Verena Marcin, visual artist and organizer
- Nadja Michael, German soprano
- Nadja Nadgornaja (born 1988), German handball player
- Nadja Obrist (born 1972), Austrian Paralympic alpine skier
- Nadja Oertelt, American science communicator
- Nadja Pasternack (born 1996), Swiss bobsledder
- Nadja Petrovic (born 1991), Macedonian painter
- Nadja Peulen, German bass guitarist for Coal Chamber
- Nadja Pries (born 1994), German BMX racer
- Nadja Purtschert (born 1989), Swiss snowboarder
- Nadja Ramskogler (born 2000), Austrian tennis player
- Nadja Regin, stage name of Serbian actress Nadežda "Nađa" Poderegin (1931–2019)
- Nadja Roma (born 1988), Swedish tennis player
- Nadja Salerno-Sonnenberg (born 1961), US violinist
- Nadja Sellrup (born 1977), Swedish ballet dancer
- Nadja Sieger (born 1967), Swiss comedian
- Nadja Spiegelman (born 1987), American writer
- Nadja Stefanoff (born 1976), German operatic soprano
- Nadja Sthamer (born 1990), German politician
- Nadja Swarovski (born 1970), Austrian business executive
- Nadja Tesich (1939–2014), Serbian-American writer, filmmaker, actress and activist
- Nadja Tiller (1929–2023), Austrian actress
- Nadja Uhl (born 1972), German actress
- Nadja West (born 1961), Surgeon General of the US Army

Fictional characters include:

- Nadja, main character of the 1928 surrealist novel Nadja by André Breton
- Nadja, main character of the anime Ashita no Nadja
- Nadja Nilsson, in the Bert Diaries novel series
- Nadja, a vampire in the TV series What We Do in the Shadows
- Nadja Chamack, in the animated series Miraculous: Tales of Ladybug and Cat Noir

== See also ==
- Nadia
