= Four Friends =

Four Friends may refer to:

- "The Four Friends", a term used in Sunni Islam to refer to the Rashidun, the first four Caliphs (namely Ali ibn Abi Talib, Abu Bakr, Umar ibn al-Khattab, Uthman ibn Affan)
- Four Friends (1981 film), a 1981 American comedy-drama film directed by Arthur Penn
- Four Friends (2010 film), a 2010 Indian film in Malayalam language
