= Film Forum =

Movie theater in Manhattan, New York

Coordinates: 40°43′42″N 74°00′15″W

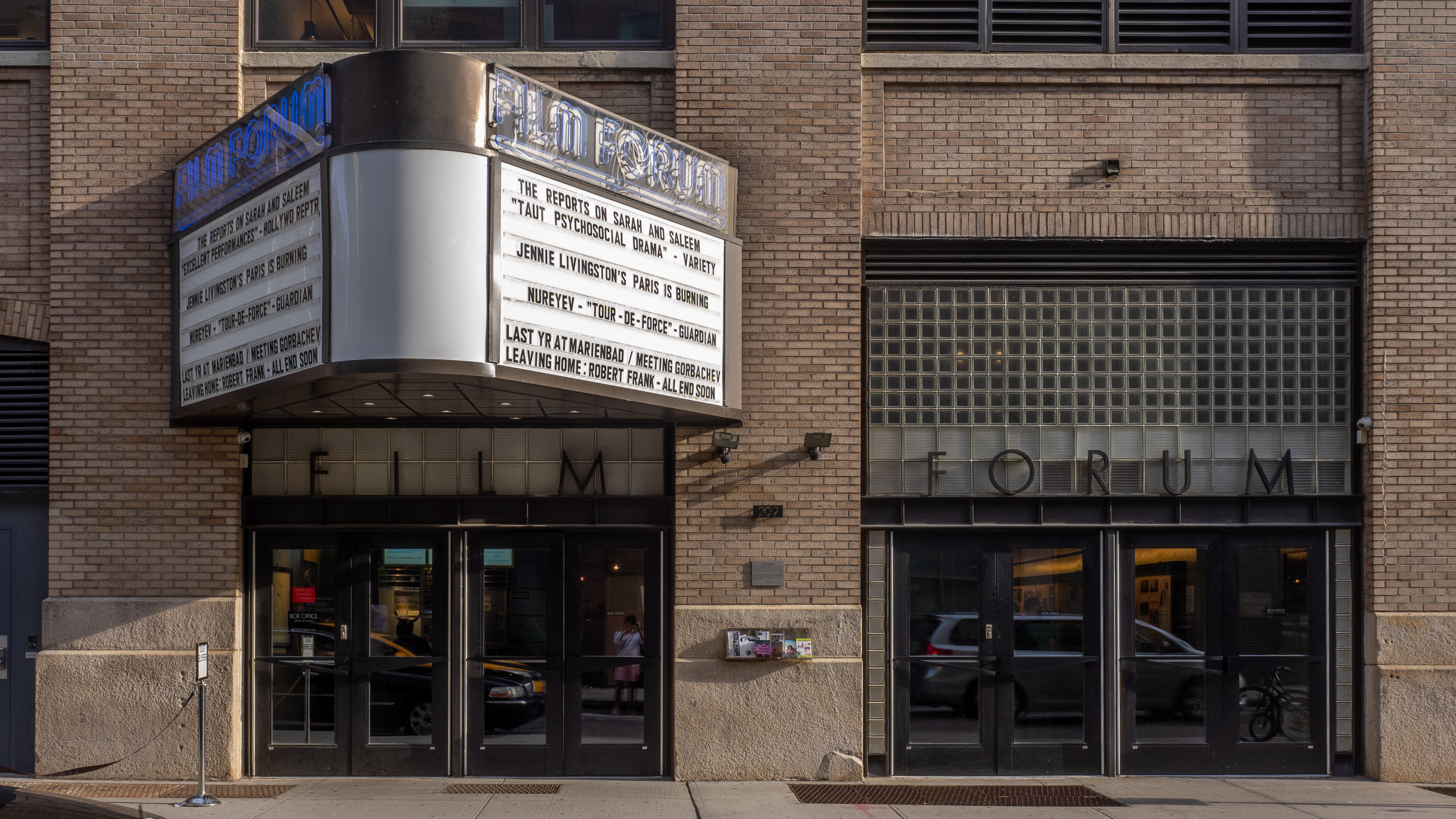
- Film Forum exterior, 2019
- Interactive map of Film Forum
- Address: Greenwich Village, Manhattan, New York City; United States
- Type: Movie theater

Construction
- Opened: 1970

Website
- Official website

The Film Forum is a nonprofit movie theater at 209 West Houston Street in Greenwich Village, Manhattan, New York City. Founded in 1970, it screens first-run independent and foreign films alongside a repertory program of revivals, retrospectives and restorations, and is the only autonomous nonprofit cinema in New York City. It operates four screens seating close to 500, is open every day of the year, and shows as many as 400 to 500 films annually.

The theater began as a weekend screening room on West 88th Street with 50 folding chairs and a single projector. Karen Cooper took charge in 1972 and led it for 51 years, moving it to Vandam Street in 1975, to a twin cinema on Watts Street in 1980, and to its present Houston Street building in 1990 after a developer bought the Watts Street site and paid the theater to leave. A $5 million renovation completed in 2018 added a fourth screen and rebuilt the existing three. Cooper retired in 2023 and was succeeded by Sonya Chung, who left in December 2025; Tabitha Jackson, formerly director of the Sundance Film Festival, became director in February 2026.

Cooper selected the theater's premieres for most of her tenure, giving American commercial releases to films including Chantal Akerman's Jeanne Dielman, 23, quai du Commerce, 1080 Bruxelles and Hoop Dreams, the latter booked before it had a distributor. Bruce Goldstein has programmed repertory since 1986, a period during which the format was contracting elsewhere in New York. Filmmakers including Agnès Varda, Christopher Nolan and Kelly Reichardt have praised the theater and its programming.

== History ==
=== Founding and Upper West Side ===
Film Forum was founded in 1970 by Peter Feinstein and Sandy Miller, two cinephiles who wanted a venue for films made outside Hollywood. It began as an alternative screening space for independent films, with 50 folding chairs, one projector and a $19,000 annual budget, in a loft on West 88th Street. Screenings were held on Friday, Saturday and Sunday evenings and coffee was served. Cooper, who first visited as a reporter, later described the audience as a mix of students, intellectuals, radicals and working people.

Karen Cooper, a Smith College literature graduate who wrote a monthly column on independent film in New York for the magazine Filmmakers Newsletter, first visited the theater as a reporter. Feinstein, unable to support himself on the roughly $100 a week the operation paid, offered it to her, and Cooper became director in 1972. The organization's assets at the time totaled $49.02. The single projector was a 16 mm machine, which Cooper at times operated herself.

Cooper solicited submissions from directors through a notice in Filmmakers Newsletter, offering to pay return shipping. Seeking foreign titles, she also traveled to the Cannes Film Festival and acquired films there.

Cooper's programming drew notice from critics who wrote favorably about the theater even though they were sometimes critical of individual bookings. Roger Greenspun of The New York Times dismissed a pair of films she had billed as funky westerns. J. Hoberman, who began writing regularly for The Village Voice in the late 1970s, covered documentaries, foreign films, animation and experimental work that the paper's senior critics passed over.

=== Vandam and Watts streets ===
By 1975 Film Forum had outgrown the 88th Street space, and a three-year grant from the Ford Foundation allowed Cooper to move it downtown to Vandam Street, into a building now occupied by the SoHo Playhouse. The theater shared the room with a resident stage company, striking the screen after each show so the set could be reassembled.

In 1980, with a $400,000 low-interest loan from the Ford Foundation, Cooper built a twin cinema in a former garage at 57 Watts Street, designed by the architect Stephen Tilly. The site was owned by Trinity Church, and Film Forum signed a 21-year lease containing a clause under which Trinity would pay the theater about $275,000 if the building were demolished. The developer Edward J. Minskoff Equities subsequently bought the property from Trinity and agreed to pay Film Forum an undisclosed sum to move. Cooper has said she contested the arrangement before the buyout was reached.

The Watts Street theater closed on September 4, 1989 and was demolished the following month; an office tower was built on the site.

Having two screens to fill, Cooper hired Bruce Goldstein in 1986 to program repertory. Goldstein then ran a film publicity firm and had previously programmed in Provincetown and, for the exhibitor Sid Geffen, at the Bleecker Street Cinema and the Carnegie Hall Cinema, as well as at the Thalia on the Upper West Side. Goldstein has said Cooper gave him a free hand and did not interfere with his selections. His first Film Forum program was a festival of CinemaScope films titled Bigger Than Life, followed by series devoted to 3-D and to William Castle; a 1987 booking of The Story of Temple Drake opened what became a recurring strand of pre-Code programming, drawn initially from the collection of the film historian William K. Everson.

=== West Houston Street ===
Film Forum signed a 20-year lease at 209 West Houston Street, between Sixth Avenue and Varick Street, and opened there in 1990 after several months without a venue. The new cinema occupied 10,000 square feet, twice the size of the Watts Street theater, and held three screens seating 137, 148 and 173; the Watts Street marquee was preserved and reinstalled. The building, a former printing plant, was built at a cost of $3.2 million. According to Goldstein, Cooper required a site near the 1 subway line, on the reasoning that the theater's core audience had followed it from the Upper West Side. Cooper designed the building, instructing the architect that it should resemble "a cross between the Bauhaus and Pee-wee's Playhouse", and selected the artwork hung in the lobby.

In 1994, Film Forum was honored with a Village Award by the Greenwich Village Society for Historic Preservation, even though it is technically in SoHo.

Mike Maggiore joined as artistic director in 1996 and began selecting premieres alongside Cooper. In 2007 a board member purchased a brownstone on King Street, around the corner from the cinema, to house Film Forum's offices.

=== 2018 renovation ===
Film Forum announced in September 2017 that it would add a fourth screen, built in space adjoining the existing theater, and renovate the other three auditoriums. The screening rooms had not been altered since the building opened in 1990, though the restrooms were upgraded in 2014 and the concession stand rebuilt in 2015. Patrons surveyed in 2016 had supplied feedback and complaints about the existing setup, seating among them.

The work installed wider and softer seats with additional legroom and steepened the floor slope, adding stadium seating in the rear rows to improve sightlines. It was overseen by Stephen Tilly, the architect of Film Forum's earlier Watts Street cinema. The project was budgeted at about $5 million, more than half of which had been raised by the time of the announcement; the Thompson Family Foundation made a gift for naming rights to the fourth screen, and a capital campaign sought the balance along with money for the endowment. The work formed part of an initiative called Film Forum 50, timed ahead of the theater's 50th anniversary in 2020, which combined the construction with an effort to enlarge the endowment and was budgeted at $6 million in total. The theater closed for construction in May 2018 and reopened that summer.

=== COVID-19 pandemic ===
Film Forum closed for nearly 13 months during the COVID-19 pandemic. It reopened on April 2, 2021 at the 25 percent capacity then permitted by the city, which limited its largest auditorium to 38 people and its smallest to 20. Masks were required, concessions were suspended, and ticket lines and seating were spaced. It introduced reserved seating as a pandemic measure and returned to first-come, first-served admission in March 2022. In September 2021, water from the remnants of Hurricane Ida entered the building during a screening and the audience was evacuated; damage was slight and screenings resumed the following day.

== Leadership ==
Film Forum has been led by four directors. The co-founder Peter Feinstein ran it from its opening in 1970 until 1972, when he offered the operation to Karen Cooper. Cooper held the position for 51 years, a tenure spanning the theater's growth from a loft screening room to a four-screen cinema. Two directors have followed her within three years.

=== Karen Cooper ===
Cooper directed Film Forum from 1972 to 2023; her work in that period is described in the History and Programming sections. The board unanimously approved a change in leadership in November 2022, and the succession was announced that January. She stepped down at the end of June 2023, remaining as an advisor with a focus on programming and fundraising and retaining a seat on the film selection committee.

=== Sonya Chung ===
Sonya Chung became director effective July 1, 2023. A novelist who had taught English at Skidmore College, she worked in Film Forum's development department from 2003 to 2007, returned to the organization in 2018, and had served as deputy director since 2020. She left the position in December 2025, after two years in the role; no reason for her departure was made public.

=== Tabitha Jackson ===
Tabitha Jackson was named director on February 2, 2026, and took up the post on February 23, the third person to hold it in under three years. Her appointment followed a national search led by board chair Gray Coleman and the human resources professional Stella Strazdas.

Jackson began her career at the BBC as a researcher, producer and director, and later worked at Channel 4 as a commissioning editor for arts, performance and animation and as an executive producer for Film4. She joined the Sundance Institute in 2013 and oversaw its Documentary Film Program before serving as director of the Sundance Film Festival from 2020 to 2022, overseeing its first largely online editions during the COVID-19 pandemic.. She subsequently held research fellowships at the Massachusetts Institute of Technology Open Documentary Lab, the Royal Shakespeare Company and Harvard Kennedy School's Shorenstein Center on Media, Politics and Public Policy, along with a Rockefeller Foundation residency.

The directorship was restructured for her arrival. Where Cooper and Chung had made day-to-day programming decisions, Jackson's role carries oversight of programming rather than direct responsibility for it, a change she described as intended to leave time for considering the theater's longer-term position.

== Programming ==
Film Forum presents two distinct film programs: premieres of American independents and foreign art films, and repertory programming, which includes foreign and American classics, genre works, festivals, and directors' retrospectives. Both are overseen by artistic directors: Mike Maggiore programs premieres, and Bruce Goldstein has programmed repertory since 1986. The theater screens as many as 400 to 500 films a year. Its calendar commits booked films to a two-week run, a guarantee the distributor Michael Tuckman described in 2017 as unusual among exhibitors.

=== Premieres ===
The premiere program is limited to a film's first American commercial release, and as a matter of policy the theater does not later revive titles it has premiered. Cooper selected these films alone until 1996, when Maggiore joined her; the programmers meet weekly to discuss the films they have seen. Jackson said in 2026 that close to half the documentaries premiered at Film Forum over the previous two years had no distributor.

Films given their American release at Film Forum include Chantal Akerman's Jeanne Dielman, 23, quai du Commerce, 1080 Bruxelles, which ran in 1983, seven years after its European release and after no other New York exhibitor had taken it; Jane Campion's first feature Two Friends; and Hoop Dreams, which the theater booked before the film had a distributor. The theater gave the American theatrical premiere of Michael Apted's Up series and hosted early American showings of animators including Nick Park, the Brothers Quay and Jan Švankmajer. Artforum credits Cooper with introducing American audiences to directors of the New German Cinema, among them Rainer Werner Fassbinder, Werner Herzog and Wim Wenders, and with programming early work by filmmakers who later became well known, including Kelly Reichardt, Christopher Nolan and Chloé Zhao. Cooper premiered several documentaries by Heddy Honigmann, whose work she considered underrecognized.

=== Repertory ===
When Goldstein began programming repertory in 1986, the format was in decline in New York: existing prints were deteriorating, studios were not striking new ones, and revivals rarely ran for more than a single screening. Goldstein worked to have new prints made and built series around themes rather than single titles, beginning with a festival of CinemaScope films and continuing with 3-D, William Castle and, from 1987, a recurring strand of pre-Code pictures drawn initially from the collection of the film historian William K. Everson. Later series have been organized around performers and directors, including a 1999 François Truffaut retrospective, and around New York City itself, under titles such as NYC Noir and Madcap Manhattan. Goldstein also programs silent films, often screened with live piano accompaniment by Steve Sterner, and Film Forum Jr., a Sunday morning series for children. He founded the distribution company Rialto Pictures, named for the Broadway theater once run by the exhibitor Arthur Mayer, whose restorations play at Film Forum and elsewhere.

== Reputation ==
Filmmakers such as Agnès Varda, D. A. Pennebaker, Christopher Nolan, Kelly Reichardt, Ramin Bahrani and many others have praised the theater and its programming. Actor Ethan Hawke said in a 2018 testimonial that "part of what I love about Film Forum is that you can trust them. They will leave you better than you came". Director and actor André Gregory said in 2022, "If New York lost the Statue of Liberty, it would not be a real loss, but if Film Forum disappeared, it would be absolutely heartbreaking."

== See also ==
- List of art cinemas in New York City
- Bruce Goldstein
