= Louise Fleming =

American filmmaker

Louise Fleming is an American independent filmmaker who specializes in non-fiction, fiction, and experimental short works.

== Early life and education ==
Fleming grew up in Michigan and Washington, DC. She is a graduate of American University and received a master's degree from the NYU School of Arts film department in 1974.

== Career ==
Fleming's short film Just Briefly was shown at the Sojourner Truth Festival of the Arts in 1976, the first ever Black women's film festival, co-organized by Black feminist Faith Ringgold, Margo Jefferson, Patricia Jones, Michele Wallace, and Monica J. Freeman. She collaborated with Nadja Tesich as script supervisor on her short Friends.

Fleming also served as production assistant on Roberta Flack's Feel Like Makin' Love album.

Her work was also featured in the 2023 Sojourner Truth Festival of the Arts 2023. Fleming previously served as co-resident/curator of women's screening Series CineWomen NY at Two Boots Pioneer Movie Theater and Anthology Film Archives.

== Filmography ==
- Just Briefly (1975)
- Thank You, Ma'am (1977)
- Friends (1979)
- My Bridge (2015), as producer
- Pecking Order (2018)
- Rain: Up Close – A Meditation (2022)
