= Steve Tesich =

Serbian-American screenwriter, playwright and novelist (1942–1996)

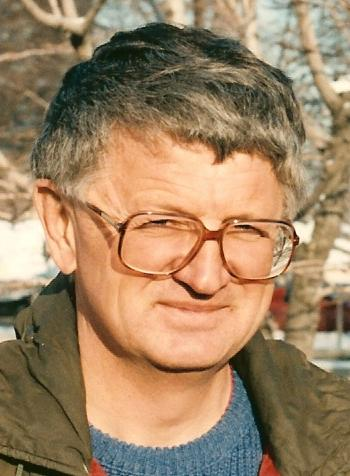
- Tesich in 1991
- Born: Stojan Tešić; September 29, 1942; Užice, Nazi-occupied Serbia
- Died: July 1, 1996 (aged 53); Sydney, Nova Scotia, Canada
- Occupations: Screenwriter; playwright; novelist
- Relatives: Nađa Tešić (sister)
- Writing career
- Years active: 1970–1996
- Notable work: Karoo

Stojan Steve Tesich (Serbian: Стојан Стив Тешић, Stojan Stiv Tešić; September 29, 1942 – July 1, 1996) was a Serbian-American screenwriter, playwright, and novelist. He won the Academy Award for Best Original Screenplay in 1979 for the film Breaking Away.

== Early life ==
He was born in Užice, in Axis-occupied Yugoslavia (now Serbia) on September 29, 1942. He immigrated to the United States with his mother and sister when he was 14 years old. His family settled in East Chicago, Indiana. His father died in 1962.

Tesich graduated from Indiana University Bloomington in 1965 with a BA in Russian. He was a member of Phi Kappa Psi fraternity. He went on to do graduate work at Columbia University, receiving an MA in Russian Literature in 1967.

After graduation, he worked as a Department of Welfare caseworker in Brooklyn, New York in 1968.

== Career ==
He began his career as a playwright with the 1969 play The Predators, which was staged as a workshop production at the American Academy of Dramatic Arts in New York City.

In the 1970s, he wrote a series of plays that were staged at The American Place Theatre in New York City. The first of these plays, The Carpenters, premiered during the 1970–1971 season. Baba Goya made its debut at the theater in May 1973; the cast included Olympia Dukakis and John Randolph. Later that year, the play was staged at the Cherry Lane Theatre under a different name (Nourish the Beast).

The play The Carpenters starring Vincent Gardenia, Jon Korkes, and Kitty Winn, presented on the Hollywood Television Theatre's Conflicts series, was shown on PBS on December 19, 1973, in a telecast from 8:30-9:30 PM EST. The theme of the play, directed by Norman Lloyd, was the disintegration of an American family divided by the generation gap.

John Randolph, Eileen Brennan, and John Beck starred in the comedy Nourish the Beast on PBS on Thursday, February 12, 1974, also presented as part of the Hollywood Television Theatre's Conflicts series. The play, also directed by Norman Lloyd, is about a dysfunctional family headed by the eccentric Baba Goya who confronts crises with her husband, son, and daughter.

Tesich's screenplay for Breaking Away (1979) had its origins in his college years. He had been an alternate rider in 1962 for the Phi Kappa Psi team in the Little 500 bicycle race. Teammate Dave Blase rode 139 of 200 laps and was the victorious rider crossing the finish line for his team. They subsequently developed a friendship. Blase became the model for the main character in Breaking Away. The working title of the film script was Bambino. The film was a hit, and Tesich won the Academy Award for Best Original Screenplay. He also created a short-lived TV series of the same name.

His play Division Street opened on Broadway at the Ambassador Theatre in New York City on October 8, 1980. The production starred John Lithgow and Keene Curtis. It closed after 21 performances. The play was revived in 1987 at the Second Stage, with Saul Rubinek in the lead role.

Tesich reunited with Peter Yates, the director of Breaking Away, on the 1981 thriller Eyewitness starring Sigourney Weaver, William Hurt, Morgan Freeman, and Christopher Plummer.

His next screenplay was for the semi-autobiographical film Four Friends which was directed by Arthur Penn which covered the activism and turbulence of the 1960s. Vincent Canby of the New York Times wrote in his review: "For Mr. Tesich, it is another original work by one of our best young screenwriters." Roger Ebert wrote in the Chicago Sun-Times that it was "a very good movie."

He adapted John Irving's novel The World According to Garp for the screen in 1982 directed by George Roy Hill and starring Robin Williams and Glenn Close in her film debut. The best-selling novel had been described as unfilmable. The screenplay was nominated for Best Drama Adapted from Another Medium by the Writers Guild of America (WGA) in 1983.

Tesich returned to the sport of cycling with the screenplay for American Flyers (1985). The main characters were two brothers, played by Kevin Costner and David Marshall Grant, who enter a long-distance bicycle race in the Colorado Rockies.

His final screenplay was for the 1985 film Eleni, starring John Malkovich, Kate Nelligan, and Linda Hunt, based on the Nicholas Gage book, also directed by Peter Yates.

His novel Karoo was published posthumously in 1998. Arthur Miller described the novel: "Fascinating—a real satiric invention full of wise outrage." The novel was a New York Times Notable Book for 1998. The novel also appeared in a German translation as Abspann, and it was also translated in France in 2012 where it was acclaimed by the critics and became a best-seller.

== Death ==
Tesich died in Sydney, Nova Scotia, Canada on July 1, 1996, following a heart attack. He was 53 years old.

== Honors and awards ==
In 1973, Tesich won the Vernon Rice or Drama Desk Award for Most Promising Playwright for the play Baba Goya, which is also known under the title Nourish the Beast.

Tesich won the following awards for the Breaking Away screenplay in 1979:

- Academy Award, Best Original Screenplay
- National Society of Film Critics Award, Best Screenplay
- New York Film Critics Circle Award, Best Screenplay
- Writers Guild of America Award, Best-Written Comedy Written Directly for the Screen
- Screenwriter of the Year, ALFS Award from the London Critics Circle Film Awards, 1981

He also received a nomination in 1980 for a Golden Globe for Best Screenplay-Motion Picture.

In 2005, Republic of Serbia Ministry of Religion and Diaspora established the annual Stojan—Steve Tešić Award, to be awarded to the writers of Serbian origin that write in other languages.

== Legacy ==
Oxford Dictionaries credits Tesich with the first use of the term "post-truth," which Oxford defined as "circumstances in which objective facts are less influential in shaping public opinion than appeals to emotion and personal belief." Ralph Keyes, author of The Post-Truth Era (2004), also says he first saw the term "in a 1992 Nation essay by the late Steve Tesich." Post-truth was Oxford's 2016 Word of the Year.

The Steve Tesich papers were gifted to the Indiana University Archives in 2025 and 2026 by Becky Tesich, Tesich's wife. They were opened for research in May 2026.

== Screenplays ==
=== Film ===
- Breaking Away (1979)
- Eyewitness (1981)
- Four Friends (1981)
- The World According to Garp (1982)
- American Flyers (1985)
- Eleni (1985)

=== Television ===
- The Carpenters, play for television, 1973
- Nourish the Beast, play for television, 1974
- Apple Pie, television series, 1978
- Breaking Away, television series, "The Cutters" (teleplay), "La Strada" (story), 1980–1981

== Plays ==
- The Predators, 1969
- The Carpenters, 1970
- Lake of the Woods, 1971
- Nourish the Beast, also performed under the title Baba Goya, 1973
- Gorky, 1975
- Passing Game, 1977
- Touching Bottom, 1978
- Division Street, 1980
- The Speed Of Darkness, 1989
- Square One, 1990
- The Road, 1990
- Baptismal, 1990
- On the Open Road, 1992
- Arts & Leisure, 1996

== Novels ==
- Summer Crossing (1982), was also published in a German translation as Ein letzter Sommer and in a French translation as Price
- Karoo (1996, posthumously released 1998), paperback edition in 2004 with new introduction by E. L. Doctorow; German-language version entitled Abspann and a French-language version Karoo same as original.

== Collections ==
- Division Street & Other Plays. New York: Performing Arts Journal Publications, 1981. 171 pages. Contents: Division Street -- Baba Goya -- Lake of the Woods -- Passing Game.

== Novelizations ==
- Breaking Away. A novel by Joseph Howard. Based on a screenplay by Steve Tesich. New York: Warner Books, Inc. 1979.
- Eyewitness. A Mystery by John Minahan. Based on a Screenplay written by Steve Tesich. New York: Avon, 1981.
- Four Friends: A Novel by Robert Grossbach. Based on the Motion Picture Written by Steven Tesich. Ballantine. New York. 1982.
- American Flyers by Steven Phillip Smith. Based on the film written by Steven Tesich. Bantam Books. New York. 1985.
