= Twilight Time (film) =

- Directed by: Goran Paskaljević
- Screenplay by: Goran Paskaljević; Filip David; Dan Tana; Rowland Barber
- Produced by: Dan Tana
- Starring: Karl Malden; Jodi Thelen; Damien Nash; Mia Roth; Pavle Vuisić; Dragan Maksimović; Stole Aranđelović
- Cinematography: Tomislav Pinter
- Edited by: Olga Skrigin
- Music by: Walter Scharf
- Production companies: Centar Film; Dan Tana Productions
- Distributed by: MGM/UA Entertainment
- Release dates: November 23, 1982 (Yugoslavia); February 13, 1983 (United States)
- Running time: 102 minutes
- Countries: United States; Yugoslavia
- Language: English

Twilight Time is a 1982 drama film directed by Goran Paskaljević, written by Goran Paskaljević, Filip David, Dan Tana and Rowland Barber, and starring Karl Malden, Jodi Thelen, Damien Nash, Mia Roth, Pavle Vuisić, Dragan Maksimović and Stole Aranđelović. It was released in the United States on February 13, 1983, by United Artists.

== Premise ==
An elderly man, returning to Yugoslavia after 20 years in America, is saddled with the upbringing of his two grandchildren in a small farming village.

== Cast ==
- Karl Malden as Marko Sekulovic
- Jodi Thelen as Lana
- Damien Nash as Ivan
- Mia Roth as Ana
- Pavle Vuisić as Pashko
- Dragan Maksimović as Tony
- Stole Aranđelović as Matan
- Petar Božović as Rocky
- Milan Srdoč as Karlo
- Peter Carsten as Factory Gateman
- Bora Todorović as Nikola
- Božidar Pavićević as Luka
- Davor Antolić as Driver
- Vladan Živković as First Worker
- Ratko Miletić as Second Worker
- Obren Helcer as Peter's Father
- Slobodanka Marković as Kristina
- Ethan Stone as Milan
- Bojana Stanković as Vera
- Izabela Gavrić as Helena
- Predrag Dejanović as Vlatko
- Nenad Dejanović as Vladimir
- Branislav Ranisavljev as Aldo
