= 2019 Upper Austria Ladies Linz – Singles =

Singles
- 2019 Upper Austria Ladies Linz

Final
- Champion: (United States) Coco Gauff
- Runner-up: (Latvia) Jeļena Ostapenko
- Score: 6–3, 1–6, 6–2

Details
- Draw: 32
- Seeds: 8

Events
Singles	Doubles
← 2018 ·	Linz Open	· 2020 →

Coco Gauff defeated Jeļena Ostapenko in the final, 6–3, 1–6, 6–2 to win the singles tennis title at the 2019 Linz Open. It was her first WTA Tour title. Aged 15 years and 7 months, Gauff became the youngest WTA Tour singles titlist since Nicole Vaidišová (15 years, 5 months) in 2004. Gauff was a lucky loser, only receiving a spot in the main draw because Maria Sakkari withdrew shortly before her first round match. Gauff became only the third player in WTA history to win a tournament as a lucky loser, and the first since Olga Danilović won the 2018 Moscow River Cup.

Camila Giorgi was the reigning champion, but withdrew before the tournament due to injury.

== Seeds ==
1. (Netherlands) Kiki Bertens (quarterfinals)
2. (Switzerland) Belinda Bencic (first round)
3. (Latvia) Anastasija Sevastova (withdrew)
4. (Croatia) Donna Vekić (second round)
5. (Germany) Julia Görges (second round)
6. (Greece) Maria Sakkari (withdrew)
7. (Czech Republic) Barbora Strýcová (first round)
8. (Russia) Ekaterina Alexandrova (semifinals)
9. (Russia) Anastasia Pavlyuchenkova (second round)

== Draw ==
=== Key ===
- Q = Qualifier
- WC = Wild card
- LL = Lucky loser
- Alt = Alternate
- ITF = ITF entry
- PR = Protected ranking
- SR = Special ranking
- SE = Special exempt
- JE = Junior exempt
- JR = Junior Accelerator Programme entrant
- CO = College Accelerator Programme entrant
- NG = Next Gen Accelerator Program entrant
- w/o = Walkover
- r = Retired
- d = Defaulted

=== Finals ===
Semifinals
LL	(United States) Coco Gauff	6	6
(Germany) Andrea Petkovic	4	4
8	(Russia) Ekaterina Alexandrova	6	6^{5}	5
(Latvia) Jeļena Ostapenko	1	7^{7}	7

Final
LL	(United States) Coco Gauff	6	1	6
(Latvia) Jeļena Ostapenko	3	6	2

=== Top half ===
First round
1/WC	(Netherlands) K Bertens	6	7
Q	(Japan) M Doi	4	5
LL	(Belgium) Y Bonaventure	3	2
(Belgium) A Van Uytvanck	6	6
(Russia) A Blinkova	1	7^{7}	6^{5}
(Ukraine) K Kozlova	6	6^{1}	7^{7}
Q	(Switzerland) S Vögele	3	6^{3}
LL	(United States) C Gauff	6	7^{7}
9	(Russia) A Pavlyuchenkova	6	6
WC	(Austria) B Haas	3	3
(Slovakia) V Kužmová	6	6
WC	(Austria) J Grabher	4	2
(Switzerland) J Teichmann	1	1
(Germany) A Petkovic	6	6
(Russia) M Gasparyan	4	2
5	(Germany) J Görges	6	6

Second round
1/WC	(Netherlands) K Bertens	4	6	6
(Belgium) A Van Uytvanck	6	3	3
(Ukraine) K Kozlova	6	4	0^{r}
LL	(United States) C Gauff	4	6	2
9	(Russia) A Pavlyuchenkova	6	2	4
(Slovakia) V Kužmová	2	6	6
(Germany) A Petkovic	7^{7}	6
5	(Germany) J Görges	6^{2}	0

Quarterfinals
1/WC	(Netherlands) K Bertens	6^{1}	4
LL	(United States) C Gauff	7^{7}	6
(Slovakia) V Kužmová	4	1
(Germany) A Petkovic	6	6

Semifinals
LL	(United States) C Gauff	6	6
(Germany) A Petkovic	4	4

=== Bottom half ===
First round
8	(Russia) E Alexandrova	3	6	6
(Czech Republic) Kr Plíšková	6	0	1
(France) F Ferro	2	7	5
Q	(Germany) L Siegemund	6	5	7
(France) K Mladenovic	6	7
(Czech Republic) K Siniaková	1	5
(Slovenia) P Hercog	1	1
4	(Croatia) D Vekić	6	6
7	(Czech Republic) B Strýcová	4	4
(France) A Cornet	6	6
Q	(Germany) T Korpatsch	1	3
(Latvia) J Ostapenko	6	6
(Kazakhstan) E Rybakina	7^{7}	6
Q	(Serbia) N Stojanović	6^{5}	2
Q	(Germany) A-L Friedsam	6	2	6
2	(Switzerland) B Bencic	4	6	2

Second round
8	(Russia) E Alexandrova	7^{7}	2	6
Q	(Germany) L Siegemund	6^{1}	6	4
(France) K Mladenovic	3	6	6
4	(Croatia) D Vekić	6	1	2
(France) A Cornet	5	1^{r}
(Latvia) J Ostapenko	7	4
(Kazakhstan) E Rybakina	6	5	6
Q	(Germany) A-L Friedsam	3	7	4

Quarterfinals
8	(Russia) E Alexandrova	6	6
(France) K Mladenovic	2	4
(Latvia) J Ostapenko	7	6
(Kazakhstan) E Rybakina	5	1

Semifinals
8	(Russia) E Alexandrova	6	6^{5}	5
(Latvia) J Ostapenko	1	7^{7}	7

== Qualifying ==
=== Seeds ===
1. (Japan) Misaki Doi (qualified)
2. (Germany) Laura Siegemund (qualified)
3. (Netherlands) Arantxa Rus (first round)
4. (Serbia) Nina Stojanović (qualified)
5. (Belgium) Kirsten Flipkens (first round)
6. (Spain) Aliona Bolsova (first round)
7. (Montenegro) Danka Kovinić (first round)
8. (United States) Caty McNally (first round)
9. (United States) Coco Gauff (qualifying competition, lucky loser)
10. (Belgium) Ysaline Bonaventure (qualifying competition, lucky loser)
11. (Italy) Jasmine Paolini (qualifying competition)
12. (France) Pauline Parmentier (qualifying competition)

=== Qualifiers ===
1. (Japan) Misaki Doi
2. (Germany) Laura Siegemund
3. (Germany) Tamara Korpatsch
4. (Serbia) Nina Stojanović
5. (Germany) Anna-Lena Friedsam
6. (Switzerland) Stefanie Vögele

=== Lucky losers ===
1. (United States) Coco Gauff
2. (Belgium) Ysaline Bonaventure

=== Draw ===
==== First qualifier ====
First round
1	(Japan) Misaki Doi	6	3	6
WC	(Austria) Melanie Klaffner	3	6	1
WC	(Austria) Mira Antonitsch	1	2
11	(Italy) Jasmine Paolini	6	6

Qualifying competition
1	(Japan) Misaki Doi	4	6	6
11	(Italy) Jasmine Paolini	6	2	3

==== Second qualifier ====
First round
2	(Germany) Laura Siegemund	6	7
(Slovenia) Kaja Juvan	3	5
(Czech Republic) Tereza Martincová	7^{7}	6
7	(Montenegro) Danka Kovinić	6^{3}	3

Qualifying competition
2	(Germany) Laura Siegemund	7^{11}	6
(Czech Republic) Tereza Martincová	6^{9}	0

==== Third qualifier ====
First round
3	(Netherlands) Arantxa Rus	3	6	3
(Germany) Tamara Korpatsch	6	4	6
(Russia) Liudmila Samsonova	7^{12}	2	2
9	(United States) Coco Gauff	6^{10}	6	6

Qualifying competition
(Germany) Tamara Korpatsch	6	6
9	(United States) Coco Gauff	4	2

==== Fourth qualifier ====
First round
4	(Serbia) Nina Stojanović	6	6
WC	(Austria) Emily Meyer	4	4
PR	(Czech Republic) Denisa Allertová	2	0
10	(Belgium) Ysaline Bonaventure	6	6

Qualifying competition
4	(Serbia) Nina Stojanović	6	6
10	(Belgium) Ysaline Bonaventure	3	4

==== Fifth qualifier ====
First round
5	(Belgium) Kirsten Flipkens	3	2
PR	(United States) Shelby Rogers	6	6
WC	(Germany) Anna-Lena Friedsam	6	6
8	(United States) Caty McNally	4	2

Qualifying competition
PR	(United States) Shelby Rogers	3	6	3
WC	(Germany) Anna-Lena Friedsam	6	4	6

==== Sixth qualifier ====
First round
6	(Spain) Aliona Bolsova	3	6	4
(Switzerland) Stefanie Vögele	6	1	6
(United States) Varvara Lepchenko	6^{6}	4
12	(France) Pauline Parmentier	7^{8}	6

Qualifying competition
(Switzerland) Stefanie Vögele	6	6
12	(France) Pauline Parmentier	4	4
