= Jodi Thelen =

American actress (born 1962)

- Born: June 12, 1962 (age 64); St. Cloud, Minnesota, USA
- Years active: 1981–2017

Jodi Thelen (born June 12, 1962) is an American actress and mental health counselor.

Born in St. Cloud, Minnesota, Thelen made her screen debut as Georgia Miles, "a willfully free-spirited girl, naive and narcissistic," in the 1981 film Four Friends.

In an interview with Roger Ebert, Thelen said she was emancipated at 15 years old and moved to Minneapolis-St. Paul so she could pursue an acting career. She worked at the Minneapolis Children’s Theater School and the Minnesota Renaissance Players, before moving to Hollywood, Los Angeles in 1979. She acted with the American Theater Arts Company while simultaneously waitressing on Hollywood Blvd.

Thelen appeared on Broadway in Brighton Beach Memoirs in 1983. Her off-Broadway credits include Springtime for Henry, Largo Desolato at The Public Theater, The Nice and the Nasty at Playwrights Horizons, The Chemistry of Change, and A Body of Water, in which she played the dual roles of Sandy and Malka. For the latter, Variety praised her "stunning transformation" between roles, while The New York Times noted the "welcome comic bite" of her Malka portrayal.

Thelen's television credits include Duet, Grace Under Fire, Touched by an Angel, Joan of Arcadia and Twin Peaks.

Later in life, Thelen became a mental health counselor in Seattle, Washington.

== Additional screen credits ==
- Four Friends (1981)
- Twilight Time (1982)
- The Black Stallion Returns (1983)
- One Night Stand (1995)
- Playback (1996)
- The Wedding Singer (1998)
- You're Still Young (2004)
- Til Death Does His Part (2007)
