= Hicksville High School (New York) =

Coordinates: 40.7591°N 73.5257°W

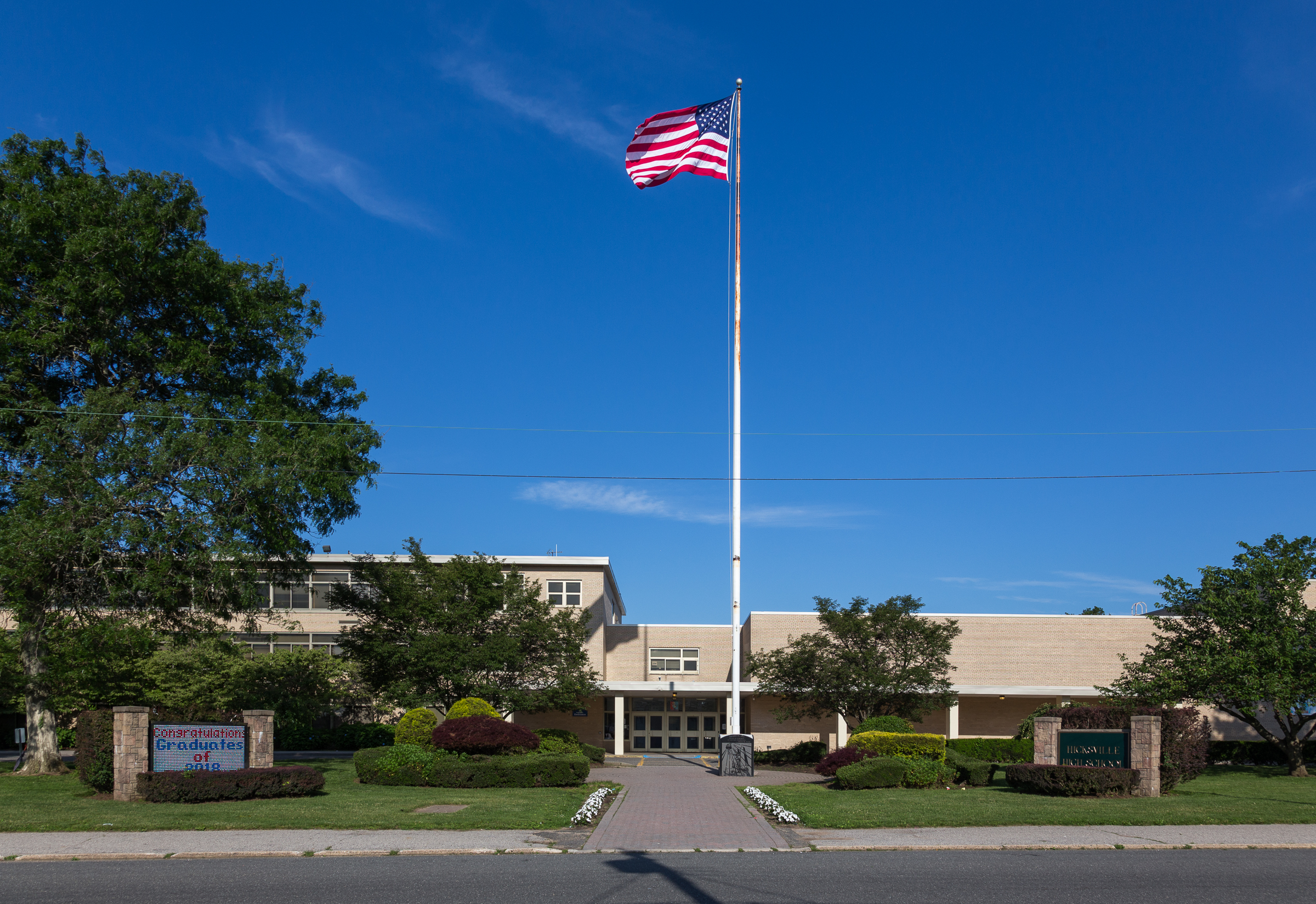
- Hicksville High School front entrance in 2019

Location
- 180 Division Avenue; Hicksville, Nassau, New York 11801; United States

Information
- School type: Public
- Opened: 1953
- School district: Hicksville Union Free School District
- NCES District ID: 3614340
- Principal: Raymond Williams
- Teaching staff: 144.59 (FTE)
- Grades: 9-12
- Enrollment: 1,866 (2023-2024)
- Student to teacher ratio: 12.91
- Colors: Black & Orange
- Website: hs.hicksvillepublicschools.org

Hicksville High School is an American high school in the town of Hicksville, New York, in Nassau County. It is the only high school in the Hicksville Union Free School District (which serves Hicksville as well as parts of Westbury, Jericho, Syosset, Bethpage & Levittown). It opened in 1953.

In the 2025–2026 school year, the school had an enrollment of 2,102 students. The principal of the school is Raymond Williams.

== Demographics ==
The student body is 52 percent male and 48 percent female, and the total minority enrollment is 57 percent. The school offers grades 9–12 and special education. With 115 full-time teachers, there is a 16:1 student-teacher ratio. Hicksville High School has a 96% graduation rate. 13% of students are enrolled in the Free Lunch program and 5% are enrolled in the Reduced Price Lunch program.

== Notable alumni ==
- Lorraine Bracco (born 1954), actress
- Theresa Caputo (born 1966), television personality
- Brian and Michael D'Addario (born 1997 & 1999, respectively) of the pop/rock band The Lemon Twigs
- Bruce Goldstein (born 1952), film programmer
- Billy Joel (born 1949), singer-songwriter and pianist (received honorary diploma 1992)
- Tim Parker (born 1993), soccer player
