= On the Open Road =

1992 play by Steve Tesich

- Written by: Steve Tesich
- Characters: Al; Angel; The Monk; The Little Girl; Jesus; Boy
- Original language: English
- Subject: Post-apocalypse
- Genre: Drama
- Setting: An unnamed post-apocalyptic metropolis

Premiere
- Date premiered: March 16, 1992
- Place premiered: The Goodman Theatre

On the Open Road is a 1992 play by Steve Tesich.

It is a post-apocalyptic tale concerning the events after a "civil war" presumably within the United States although no location is given. Characters drag wheeled carts filled with meager possessions through a destroyed unnamed wasteland. There have been numerous productions throughout the U.S.

The play opened on March 16, 1992, at The Goodman Theatre in Chicago directed by Robert Falls featuring Jordan Charney as Al and Steve Pickering as Angel.

== Plot ==
The setting of the play is a “place of Civil War”. There are references to Berthold Brecht, Samuel Beckett, and burlesque.

The play opens in a post-apocalyptic wasteland ravaged by marauding armies. The character Angel is seen standing on a traffic barricade. His head is in a noose and he is gagged. Al, a man pulling a cart, runs into him. The cart contains works of art, renowned artistic creations that have been ransacked and salvaged from devastated art museums. The museums were destroyed by bombs during the apocalyptic war. Angel decides to pull the cart himself in place of Al. For this, he will be freed and Al will teach him art history and musical appreciation along the way. He will pull the cart to the far-off border where these two "independents" will find liberty.

In the second act, Angel and Al are apprehended by the new coalition government. They must assassinate Jesus to obtain their release, who in a Second Coming reappears in human form as a cellist. Jesus is incarcerated in a monastery where he is tortured. A monk meets them and tells them to kill the prisoner forthwith without any delay.

The monk delivers a monologue in which he compares the Second Coming of Christ to the case of a successful contemporary playwright who must now compete with a returned William Shakespeare. The monk tells them: Jesus “must die for our art to go on”. The implication is that organized religion is a pale imitation of the real teachings of Christ and Christianity and that this failing contributed to humanity's downfall.

== Sources ==
- Gerard, Jeremy. Review: On the Open Road by Steve Tesich. February 18, 1993. Variety. Retrieved 15 June 2023.
- Richards, David. "Sunday View: A Post-Industrial Didi and Gogo On the Open Road." February 21, 1993. New York Times. Retrieved 15 June 2023.
- Smith, Var. Review: On the Open Road. November 5, 2019. Backstage. Retrieved 15 June 2023.
- Sommers, Pamela. "'Open Road': Everyman's Fateful Journey." May 22, 1995. The Washington Post. Retrieved 19 June 2023.
- Williams, Albert. "On the Open Road." March 26, 1992. Chicago Reader. Retrieved 19 June 2023.
