= Nađa =

Nađa is a feminine given name found in Serbia and Montenegro. It is sometimes written Nadja.

Notable people with the name include:

- Nađa Dizdarević (fl. 2000s), Bosnian woman whose husband was detained at Guantanamo
- Nađa Đurđevac (born 2002), Montenegrin football player
- Nađa Higl (born 1987), Serbian swimmer
- Nađa Kadović (born 2003), Montenegrin handball player
- Nađa Ninković (born 1991), Serbian volleyball player
- Nađa Stanović (born 1999), Montenegrin football player
- Nađa Tešić (1939–2014), Serbian-American writer, filmmaker, actress and activist
