= People's Strong Serbia =

Serbian political party

People's Strong Serbia (Serbian: Народна Јака Србија, romanized: Narodna jaka Srbija; abbr. НЈС / NJS), otherwise known as Living Wall, is a small right-wing political party in Serbia. The party's leader is Igor D. Jaksić. The NJS won one seat in the 2020 Vojvodina provincial election, which it contested in an alliance with the Democratic Party of Serbia (Demokratska stranka Srbije, DSS), although its elected member has since left the party.

== History ==
The NJS was registered on 7 April 2017 as a political party representing Serbia's Russian national minority; a contemporary report in Južne vesti indicated that this designation, while legal, had the obvious benefit of giving the party a lower electoral threshold to win assembly representation. In an interview from this period, Jaksić said that the party favoured closer ties to Russia and opposed the European Union, international agencies such as the International Monetary Fund, and what it described as "heavy capitalism." It has sought to prevent the eviction of citizens from their apartments and has launched a petition against private estate executors.

The NJS joined the DSS's METLA 2020 coalition in March 2020. In announcing the alliance, Jaksić said that the NJS would seek to end what he described as the "weird and mafia system" of Serbia's existing government. He also opposed Serbia's free zones for migrants and called for the border to be closed, and said that the status of Kosovo should be resolved under the Serbian constitution and United Nations Security Council Resolution 1244.

Two NJS candidates appeared on METLA 2020's electoral list in the 2020 Vojvodina election: Nada Ševo in the third position and Mihajlo Ulemek in the ninth. The list won five mandates, and Ševo was elected. The election was won by the Serbian Progressive Party and its allies, and the DSS/METLA group served in opposition. The NJS also contested the concurrent 2020 Serbian parliamentary election on the METLA 2020 list, with Jaksić in the eighteenth list position. This list did not cross the threshold to win representation in the national assembly.

On 29 October 2020, Ševo left the NJS and the DSS/METLA group in the provincial assembly to join the Progressive Party's Aleksandar Vučić – For Our Children parliamentary group.
