= Karoo (novel) =

1998 novel by Steve Tesich

- Author: Steve Tesich
- Cover artist: Nick Stone
- Language: English
- Genre: Novel
- Publisher: penguin Random House
- Publication date: 1998
- Publication place: United States
- Media type: Print
- Pages: 464
- ISBN: 9780099777915

Karoo is a novel by Steve Tesich, published by Chatto & Windus (a division of Random House) in 1998. Oscar-winning writer Tesich died shortly after finishing this novel in 1996 at the age of 53. Karoo was Tesich’s final work and was released posthumously in 1998.

The novel is the story of a New York based movie script doctor, Saul 'Doc' Karoo, whose job is to fix film scripts, often at the cost of the writer's originality and dignity, to ensure a movie does well at the box office. We follow Karoo through his privileged lifestyle as he tries to deal with alcoholism, fatherhood, divorce, sex and show business.

== Plot summary ==
It’s the last Christmas party of 1980 in New York City, Saul Karoo, a script doctor - and the narrator - spends the Christmas party finding a way to avoid taking his adopted teenage son, Billy, home with him. He succeeds by bringing a younger, drunken woman home instead. It becomes quickly apparent that Karoo struggles with intimacy, alcoholism and hypochondria. He believes he “no longer has his health” for this reason he no longer has health insurance. He also believes no matter how much he drinks he is not able to become drunk.

Karoo regularly meets with his wife, Dianah, to make divorce arrangements. These meet-ups have been taking place over a long period of time and have become as much a new kind of relationship as it is the end of an old, failing one.

Jay Cromwell, a big shot movie producer, who Karoo has previously worked for, contacts Karoo to do some doctoring on a new script. This time on an Arthur Houseman - who is considered a veteran director - script, Karoo is aware that a previous project he did with Cromwell ended in a directors suicide. But he is asked to “think about it” and is told there is “no rush”.

Left with the tape as an incentive to change his mind, Karoo watches the movie. He realises now that the movie is a master piece, the movie doesn’t need editing. But things change when he is convinced that one of the actresses is the biological mother of Billy. He believes that the actress voice shares the same voice of the young woman he had talked to over the phone when he spoke to Billy’s mother before his birth.

Karoo heads to Venice Beach to track the actress down. Eventually it is confirmed that Leila Miller (the actress) is in fact Billy’s biological mother. She doesn’t recognise Billy or Karoo as she hasn’t seen Billy since his birth and only had one phone conversation with Karoo years ago.

We find Leila is haunted by the memory of giving up her child and still unaware of the facts, she and Karoo fall in love. For this reason Karoo attempts to fix the Arthur Houseman movie to make Leila the star, at the price of ruining the master piece he considered the original cut to be.

Billy and Leila started to fall for one another, still unaware of the true connection between them. But Karoo has a plan, at the first screening of the new movie as Leila becomes a star he will also tell them both the truth about their relation to one another.

On the morning of the screening they take a trip, which ends in a road accident. With Karoo at the wheel, their car crashed into an oncoming vehicle, killing both Leila and Billy and leaving Karoo unconscious in a hospital bed for days.

Upon waking Karoo learns that both his girlfriend and son are now dead and the movie was a hit. Leila, though posthumously, was now a star. Karoo at this point no longer narrates the book, he is merely spoken of in the third person now.

Finally Karoo is asked by the relentless Cromwell to turn his exposé about the accident into a screenplay for a movie.

== Sources ==
- Kent. Bill. "Doc Faustus". April 19, 1998. The New York Times. Retrieved 16 June 2023.
- Bywater, Michael. "Karoo by Steve Tesich. Michael Bywater rediscovers a masterly comic tragedy." July 17, 2007. New Humanist. Retrieved 16 June 2023.
- Boragini, Giorgia. Steve Tesich --- Karoo. 1999. Inkroci. Retrieved 16 June 2023.
