= 2018 Upper Austria Ladies Linz =

- Date: 8–14 October
- Edition: 32nd
- Category: WTA International
- Draw: 32S / 16D
- Prize money: $250,000
- Surface: Hard (indoor)
- Location: Linz, Austria
- Venue: TipsArena Linz

Champions

Singles
- (Italy) Camila Giorgi

Doubles
- (Belgium) Kirsten Flipkens / (Sweden) Johanna Larsson
- Linz Open

The 2018 Upper Austria Ladies Linz was a women's tennis tournament played on indoor hard courts. It was the 32nd edition of the Linz Open, and part of the WTA International tournaments-category of the 2018 WTA Tour. It was held at the TipsArena Linz in Linz, Austria, from 8 to 14 October 2018. Fifth-seeded Camila Giorgi won the singles title.

== Finals ==
=== Singles ===
- (Italy) Camila Giorgi defeated (Russia) Ekaterina Alexandrova, 6–3, 6–1

=== Doubles ===
- (Belgium) Kirsten Flipkens / (Sweden) Johanna Larsson defeated (United States) Raquel Atawo / (Germany) Anna-Lena Grönefeld, 4–6, 6–4, [10–5]

== Points and prize money ==
=== Point distribution ===
| Event | W | F | SF | QF | Round of 16 | Round of 32 | Q | Q2 | Q1 |
| Singles | 280 | 180 | 110 | 60 | 30 | 1 | 18 | 12 | 1 |
| Doubles | 280 | 180 | 110 | 60 | 1 | —N/a | —N/a | —N/a | —N/a |

=== Prize money ===
| Event | W | F | SF | QF | Round of 16 | Round of 32^{1} | Q2 | Q1 |
| Singles | $43,000 | $21,400 | $11,500 | $6,200 | $3,420 | $2,220 | $1,285 | $750 |
| Doubles * | $12,300 | $6,400 | $3,435 | $1,820 | $960 | —N/a | —N/a | —N/a |

_{^{1} Qualifiers prize money is also the Round of 32 prize money}
_{* per team}

== Singles entrants ==
=== Seeds ===
| Country | Player | Rank^{1} | Seed |
|---|---|---|---|
| GER | Julia Görges | 10 | 1 |
| NED | Kiki Bertens | 11 | 2 |
| CZE | Barbora Strýcová | 26 | 3 |
| ~~SVK~~ | ~~Dominika Cibulková~~ | ~~30~~ | ~~4~~ |
| ITA | Camila Giorgi | 31 | 5 |
| RUS | Anastasia Pavlyuchenkova | 34 | 6 |
| SVK | Magdaléna Rybáriková | 35 | 7 |
| CRO | Donna Vekić | 38 | 8 |
| CZE | Kateřina Siniaková | 40 | 9 |

- Rankings as of October 1, 2018

=== Other entrants ===
The following players received wildcards into the singles main draw:

- (United Kingdom) Harriet Dart
- (Austria) Barbara Haas
- (Germany) Andrea Petkovic

The following player received entry through a protected ranking:

- (Russia) Margarita Gasparyan

The following players received entry from the qualifying draw:

- (Russia) Ekaterina Alexandrova
- (Russia) Anna Blinkova
- (France) Fiona Ferro
- (Greece) Valentini Grammatikopoulou
- (Slovakia) Anna Karolína Schmiedlová
- (Switzerland) Jil Teichmann

The following player received entry as a lucky loser:

- (Czech Republic) Kristýna Plíšková

=== Withdrawals ===
Before the tournament

- (Slovakia) Dominika Cibulková → replaced by (Czech Republic) Kristýna Plíšková
- (Estonia) Anett Kontaveit → replaced by (Belarus) Vera Lapko
- (Sweden) Rebecca Peterson → replaced by (Switzerland) Stefanie Vögele

=== Retirements ===
- (Puerto Rico) Monica Puig

== Doubles entrants ==
=== Seeds ===
| Country | Player | Country | Player | Rank^{1} | Seed |
|---|---|---|---|---|---|
| USA | Raquel Atawo | GER | Anna-Lena Grönefeld | 58 | 1 |
| UKR | Lyudmyla Kichenok | SLO | Katarina Srebotnik | 59 | 2 |
| BEL | Kirsten Flipkens | SWE | Johanna Larsson | 67 | 3 |
| ROU | Irina Bara | SUI | Xenia Knoll | 147 | 4 |

- ^{1} Rankings as of October 1, 2018

=== Other entrants ===
The following pairs received wildcards into the doubles main draw:

- (Austria) Melanie Klaffner / (Slovakia) Viktória Kužmová
- (Austria) Mavie Österreicher / (Austria) Nadja Ramskogler
