= Karen Cooper =

- Education: Smith College
- Occupations: President and director of Film Forum (until 2023)

Karen Cooper was the president and director of the New York City-based independent, nonprofit cinema Film Forum.

== Biography ==
Karen Cooper has served as director of Film Forum since 1972, presiding over the growth of the nonprofit Manhattan movie house from a 50-seat screening room to its present-day incarnation: a four-screen cinema, located in lower Manhattan. Today considered one of America's leading venues for new American independent and foreign art house features, Cooper oversees programming and selects premieres for Film Forum alongside associate Mike Maggiore. The theater is also renowned for its international and domestic repertory programming, curated by Bruce Goldstein.

Under Cooper, Film Forum introduced the early films of New German Cinema filmmakers Rainer Werner Fassbinder, Wim Wenders, and Werner Herzog in the 1970s. The 1980s saw Cooper bringing such documentaries as The Atomic Cafe and Henry Hampton's Eyes on the Prize to the theater's screens. In the pursuing decades, various films and documentaries have been presented by Cooper to Film Forum and New York audiences at large, by such filmmakers as Allison Anders, Chris Marker, Albert Maysles, Bruce Weber, and Asghar Farhadi. Recently, Film Forum premiered Maren Ade's Toni Erdmann and Raoul Peck's I Am Not Your Negro, both of which were nominated at the 89th Academy Awards.

In addition to her work at Film Forum, Cooper has served as juror at film festivals worldwide, including those in Naples, Morelia (Mexico), Oberhausen, Leipzig, Vancouver, Sarajevo, Amsterdam, and Copenhagen. She has also served on funding panels for the National Endowment on the Arts, the NYC Department of Cultural Affairs, and the NYS Council on the Arts. She is the recipient of Brandeis University's Citation for Film, the New York Film Critics Special Award for Programming, New York Women in Film's MUSE Award and the Municipal Art Society's Certificate of Merit. In 2010, the Museum of Modern Art paid tribute to Cooper with Karen Cooper Carte Blanche: 40 Years of Documentary Premieres at Film Forum.

== Personal life ==
A graduate of Smith College, Cooper received an Honorary Doctorate from the American Film Institute in 1995. She is a longtime resident of Greenwich Village and is married to George Griffin, an experimental animator.
