= Nada Ševo =

Serbian politician

Nada Ševo (Serbian Cyrillic: Нада Шево; born 1978) is a politician in Serbia. She has served in the Assembly of Vojvodina since 2020. Elected as a member of People's Strong Serbia in an alliance with the Democratic Party of Serbia (Demokratska stranka Srbije, DSS), Ševo joined the Serbian Progressive Party's Aleksandar Vučić – For Our Children parliamentary group in October 2020.

== Private life and career ==
Ševo holds a Bachelor of Laws degree. She lives in Novi Sad.

== Politician ==
People's Strong Serbia contested the 2020 Vojvodina provincial election on the DSS's MELTA 2020 list. Ševo appeared in the third position and was elected when the list won five mandates; the other four elected candidates were from DSS. The Progressive Party and its allies won the election, and the DSS/METLA caucus served in opposition.

On 29 October 2020, Ševo left People's Strong Serbia and the DSS/METLA caucus (amid much acrimony) and joined the Progressive-led For Our Children parliamentary group. Her decision caused the DSS/METLA group to lose its parliamentary status, as five members are required for official recognition. Ševo is now the vice-president of the assembly committee on health, social policy, labour, demographic policy, and social child care. It is unclear if she has formally joined the Progressive Party.
