= Rialto Pictures =

American film distributor

- Company type: Private
- Industry: Motion picture
- Founded: 1997
- Founder: Bruce Goldstein
- Headquarters: New York City, U.S.
- Products: Film distribution
- Website: www.rialtopictures.com

Rialto Pictures is a film distributor founded in 1997 by Bruce Goldstein and based in New York City. A year later, Adrienne Halpern joined him as partner. In 2002, Eric Di Bernardo became the company's National Sales Director. It was described as "the gold standard of reissue distributors" by film critic Kenneth Turan. In 1999, Rialto received a special Heritage Award from the National Society of Film Critics, and in 2000 received a special award from the New York Film Critic's Circle, presented to Goldstein and Halpern by Jeanne Moreau. The two co-presidents have each received the French Order of Chevalier of Arts and Letters.

== History ==
In 2002, the company released the film Murderous Maids, the true story of two homicidal sisters, starring Sylvie Testud. In 2004 Rialto released the previously unreleased original 1954 Japanese version of Ishiro Honda's Godzilla, Peter Davis's newly restored 1974 documentary Hearts and Minds, and Gillo Pontecorvo's The Battle of Algiers. This was followed in 2006 by the re-release of Alberto Lattuada's Mafioso, a dark comedy from 1962 starring Alberto Sordi, which was featured at the New York Film Festival. One of Rialto's 2008 releases was Max Ophüls' legendary film Lola Montès in a new 35mm restoration, which was showcased at Cannes Film Festival, Telluride Film Festival, and the New York Film Festival. In 2009, Rialto undertook the first U.S. release of Jean-Luc Godard's Made in U.S.A., which could not be previously released due to rights issues, and also re-released Costa-Gavras' thriller Z.

In 2006, the company released Jean-Pierre Melville's 1969 Army of Shadows, never before shown in the U.S. Since 2012, Rialto has been the main U.S. theatrical and non-theatrical representative of the StudioCanal library of 6,500 international titles.

2007 marked Rialto's tenth anniversary, a milestone that was celebrated with a retrospective at the Museum of Modern Art in New York. Similar tributes were held at George Eastman House, in Rochester, New York; the AFI Silver Theater in Washington, D.C.; and the SIFF Theater in Seattle. The Criterion Collection issued a DVD box set entitled "Ten Years of Rialto Pictures" on October 28, 2008, which included ten of Rialto's previously released films, including Army of Shadows, Au hasard Balthazar, Band of Outsiders, Billy Liar, Discreet Charm of the Bourgeoisie, Mafioso, Murderous Maids, Rififi, The Third Man and Touchez pas au grisbi.

== Selected releases ==
- Army of Shadows
- Band of Outsiders
- The Battle of Algiers
- Le Cercle Rouge
- Contempt
- Diary of a Chambermaid
- Django
- Le Doulos
- Elevator to the Gallows
- Fanfan la Tulipe
- Godzilla
- The Graduate
- Grand Illusion
- It Always Rains on Sunday
- Last Year at Marienbad
- Lola Montès
- Made in U.S.A.
- Mafioso
- Masculine Feminine
- Nights of Cabiria
- That Obscure Object of Desire
- Peeping Tom
- The Producers
- Rififi
- Touchez pas au grisbi
- Two or Three Things I Know About Her
- A Woman Is a Woman
- Z
