= Eyewitness (1981 film) =

1981 film by Peter Yates

- Theatrical release poster
- Directed by: Peter Yates
- Written by: Steve Tesich
- Produced by: Peter Yates
- Starring: William Hurt; Sigourney Weaver; Christopher Plummer; James Woods
- Cinematography: Matthew F. Leonetti
- Edited by: Cynthia Scheider
- Music by: Stanley Silverman
- Color process: Technicolor
- Distributed by: 20th Century Fox
- Release date: February 13, 1981
- Running time: 103 minutes
- Country: United States
- Language: English
- Budget: $8.5 million
- Box office: $6.4 million (domestic)

Eyewitness (released in the UK as The Janitor) is a 1981 American neo-noir thriller film produced and directed by Peter Yates and written by Steve Tesich. It stars William Hurt, Sigourney Weaver, Christopher Plummer, Morgan Freeman and James Woods. The story involves a television news reporter and a janitor who team up to solve a murder.

== Plot ==
New York City janitor Daryll Deever is an avid fan of television news reporter Toni Sokolow. Another janitor, Aldo, is fired from the same office building Daryll works at after a confrontation with Mr. Long, a wealthy Vietnamese man suspected of criminal connections. Trying to have Aldo reinstated, Daryll talks to Mr. Long. However, he quickly realizes that Aldo was fired for being disrespectful, most probably because of the xenophobic sentiments he developed while fighting in the Vietnam War. One night, Daryll finds Mr. Long strangled to death. Looking for the killer, the police become suspicious of Aldo but also of Daryll, who fought in Vietnam as well and was the first to find the body. Aldo lies to the police about where he was that night and later shows up with more money than he ever had. Because of all of this, Daryll is sure Aldo killed Long.

Meanwhile, Toni believes Deever knows something about the crime. She keeps after him for information, a pursuit Daryll allows because he is romantically interested in Toni. The two start meeting regularly and soon develop feelings for each other. One night, before one of their "dates", Long's Vietnamese associates attempt to kidnap her to know how much she has learned about their organization. To escape them, Toni manages to jump out of their car and onto the street, where Daryll picks her up on his motorcycle. At Daryll's place, he takes care of her wounds, and the two eventually sleep together. Aldo is later revealed to be innocent of the murder; he lied to the police because he was secretly dealing with loan sharks from two different sides of town. From them, he got two huge loans to start a business with Daryll, who refuses to be involved. Worried about Aldo's life, Daryll tells him to return the money.

Joseph, Toni's fiancé, also suspects Daryll knows more than he lets on. One night, he attempts to kill Daryll by strangling him. However, Joseph fails this time and is forced to flee. He turns out to be the murderer of Mr. Long, whose organization was helping Joseph smuggle out Jews from the Soviet Union. When Mr. Long appeared with threats of blackmail, Joseph was forced to kill him. Unaware of all of this, Toni decides to break up with Daryll and marry Joseph, who belongs to her social class and, thus, would make her parents happy. In an attempt to save his relationship, Daryll agrees to a meeting with her and her parents at Toni's place. However, before it occurs, Joseph calls Daryll pretending to be Toni's father and talks him into going alone to a different address. When Daryll does not show up at her place, Toni goes to his apartment, realizes what is going on and calls the police.

Meanwhile, Daryll goes to the address Joseph gave him, which turns out to be a horse stable on a deserted street. There, he is attacked by Joseph and an associate. Using his knowledge of animals and a firecracker, Daryll creates a stampede within the building that ends up disarming Joseph and making his associate flee. Joseph and Darryll fight hand to hand until the police arrive. Joseph then stops fighting and goes outside. One of the officers, Lt. Jacobs, believes Joseph is armed (Joseph deliberately reaches into an inside pocket to give that impression) and shoots him dead. Later, Toni arrives and embraces Daryll, realizing he is alive and well.

== Cast ==
- William Hurt as Daryll Deever
- Sigourney Weaver as Antonia "Toni" Sokolow
- Christopher Plummer as Joseph
- James Woods as Alan “Aldo” Mercer
- Irene Worth as Mrs. Sokolow
- Kenneth McMillan as Mr. Deever
- Pamela Reed as Linda Mercer
- Albert Paulsen as Mr. Sokolow
- Steven Hill as Lt. Jacobs
- Morgan Freeman as Lt. Black
- Alice Drummond as Mrs. Eunice Deever
- Chao-Li Chi as Mr. Long
- Keone Young as Mr. Long's son

== Production ==
The news equipment and promotional posters actually belonged to a real television station in New York City, then-Metromedia owned independent WNEW-TV. Two then-station employees, news anchor John Roland and sportscaster Bill Mazer, made cameo appearances in the film. Sigourney Weaver, whose father Sylvester "Pat" Weaver had been a top network television executive, also worked for the station in order to gain experience. Both WNEW-TV (now Fox-owned-and-operated WNYW) and the film were under the corporate umbrella of 21st Century Fox until March 20, 2019, when Rupert Murdoch sold most of 21st Century Fox's film and television assets, including the film, to The Walt Disney Company.

The stable sequence was filmed on location at the Claremont Riding Academy on 89th Street.

Producer-director Peter Yates, screenwriter Steve Tesich and editor Cynthia Scheider had collaborated two years earlier on the film Breaking Away.

Hum To Mohabbat Karega, a 2000 Bollywood thriller-comedy film starring Karishma Kapoor and Bobby Deol, was inspired by Eyewitness.

== Reception ==
On review aggregator website Rotten Tomatoes, the film has an approval rating of 75% based on 12 reviews.
