= Nadja Oertelt =

American science communicator

- Education: Massachusetts Institute of Technology
- Occupations: CEO, Chief Content Officer
- Employer(s): Massive Science, Science Friday
- Notable work: Unorthodox (2013 documentary)

Nadja Oertelt is an American science media producer and Chief Content Officer of Science Friday. She is known for her work as a science communicator.

== Education ==
Oertelt graduated from Massachusetts Institute of Technology, where she studied neuroscience, in 2007.

== Career ==
In February 2020, Oertelt became the Chief Content Officer of Science Friday, an American radio program about science.

Oertelt is also the co-founder and CEO of Massive Science, a science media company. She works to train scientists to communicate more clearly with the public about science. Before becoming CEO, Oertelt was the chief content officer.

Prior to founding Massive Science, Oertelt produced science videos for outlets like Mashable, Vice, BuzzFeed, and Vox. She publicly shared her frustration after being laid off from Mashable during mass layoffs in 2016. She continues to serve as senior producer on science-related videos.

Oertelt produced The Fundamentals of Neuroscience, one of the first MOOCs, for Harvard University. Oertelt also co-directed and co-produced Unorthodox, a documentary about Modern Orthodox Jewish culture, with Anna Wexler, now a professor at the University of Pennsylvania.

Oertelt is also involved with TEDMED. In 2017, she gave a talk at the TEDMED conference about her work on science literacy. She was part of the editorial advisory board for the 2018 and 2020 conferences.
