= Nada Naumović =

Yugoslav partisan killed in World War II

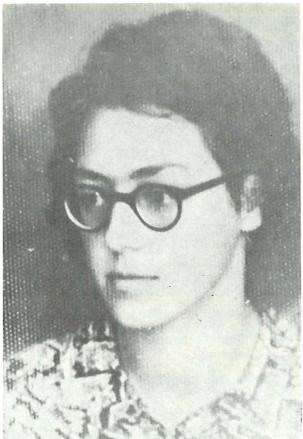
Nada Naumović

Nada Naumović (Serbian Cyrillic: Нада Наумовић; 22 April 1922 – 21 October 1941) was a Serbian student activist who was killed in World War II and was posthumously named a People's Hero of Yugoslavia.

Born in Kragujevac, Nada Naumović was a student in Belgrade. She was an active participant in the work of the Progressive high school pupils and university youth. She became a member of the Communist Party of Yugoslavia at the Belgrade Medical School in 1940. After the occupation of Yugoslavia she came back to Kragujevac, where she, as an illegal party worker, participated in working with youth, collecting of sanitary materials, clothes and food for Partisan battle groups. She was executed in the massive execution of the citizens of Kragujevac in October 1941.

Naumović was the recipient of the Order of the People's Hero of Yugoslavia from 20 December 1951.

== Literature ==
- Military Encyclopedia 6 (Nadvođe—Pirit) page 137, editor in chief: colonel general Vojo Todorović, publication by redaction of Military Encyclopedia Belgrade © 1964
