= Bruce Goldstein =

American film programmer and distributor

- Born: July 5, 1952 (age 74); Amityville, New York, U.S.
- Years active: 1971–present
- Spouse: Keiko Kimura
- Awards: New York Film Critics Circle Awards, Order of Arts and Letters, Mel Novikoff award

Bruce Goldstein (born July 5, 1952) is a New York City based film programmer, distributor, documentarian, writer, producer, and publicist. He is best known for his work as the repertory programmer for Film Forum in New York. The magazine Time Out New York named him “one of the 101 essential people or places of New York,” citing him “for keeping showmanship alive.”

== Early life ==
Bruce Goldstein, the son of Murray and Betty (Horowitz) Goldstein, was born in Amityville, New York, on Long Island and raised in nearby Hicksville. He attended Hicksville High School and went on to Boston University, dropping out to run a movie theater in Provincetown, Massachusetts, on Cape Cod, where he created his first repertory film calendars.

== Career ==
=== Publicity and The Thalia ===
In the mid-1970s, he moved to Greenwich Village in New York City to work at the revival houses Bleecker Street Cinema and Carnegie Hall Cinema, where he supervised the production of the monthly film calendars and contributed to the programming. The first films he booked were two films by John Waters (who he'd known in Provincetown): Multiple Maniacs and Mondo Trasho, which had their New York premieres at the Bleecker. After a two-year stint in London, working as production manager for a fashion forecasting company in Chelsea, Goldstein returned to New York to work as programmer, publicist, and co-director of the Thalia Theater, a revival house on the Upper West Side. While at the theater, he and Thalia owner Richard Schwarz produced a compilation film called Hollywood Out-takes and Rare Footage, which had national distribution through their own company, Manhattan Movietime. While at the Thalia, Goldstein developed his flair for ballyhoo, putting on well-publicized events like a “Fay Way Scream-Alike” contest on the 50th anniversary of the premiere of King Kong at Radio City Music Hall. He'd later create similar events for Film Forum, including a Betty Boop Look-A-like Contest, and recreations of William Castle gimmicks "Percept-o" and "Emerge-O" for The Tingler and House on Haunted Hill, respectively. After leaving the Thalia in 1984, Goldstein began the p.r. firm of Falco & Goldstein (his imaginary partner, Sidney Falco, was the character played by Tony Curtis in Sweet Smell of Success), with clients including New Yorker Films, Kino International, and Warner Bros. Animation.

=== Film Forum ===
In 1986, Goldstein was hired by Karen Cooper, director of New York's Film Forum, to program the theater's second screen. Since then, he has produced four repertory calendars for Film Forum a year. Goldstein has created over 500 film festivals, and has been instrumental in putting over 1,000 new 35mm prints into circulation. He is known for his exhaustive retrospectives and thematic festivals, popularizing “Pre-Code” movies, interactive “gimmick” movie screenings (especially William Castle's The Tingler), his tributes to in-person guests (Fay Wray, Jules Dassin, Leslie Caron, Anna Karina, Robert Downey Sr. and many others), and for long run rediscoveries in 35mm prints and digital restorations.

=== Rialto Pictures ===
In 1997, Goldstein founded Rialto Pictures, described as "the gold standard of reissue distributors" by Los Angeles Times/NPR film critic Kenneth Turan, as a means to exhibit classics that were not in distribution in the U.S.

Since then, the company has reissued over 75 international films. Some of Rialto's releases include Fellini's Nights of Cabiria (for which a previously lost scene was restored), the original 1954 Japanese version of Godzilla, Godard's Contempt and Breathless, Elevator to the Gallows, The Battle of Algiers, Grand Illusion and the first U.S. release of Made in U.S.A.. In 2006, the company released Jean-Pierre Melville's 1969 Army of Shadows, never before shown in the U.S.; it was named the Best Foreign Film of the Year by both the Los Angeles Film Critics Circle and the New York Film Critics Circle. Since 2012, Rialto has been the main U.S. theatrical and non-theatrical representative of the Studiocanal library of 6,500 international titles. In 2007, the Museum of Modern Art presented a retrospective tribute to Goldstein's company, entitled "Rialto Pictures: Reviving Classic Cinema."

Goldstein has written and produced many of Rialto's trailers and has served as art director on the company's posters. He has also worked closely on editing the subtitles of Rialto's foreign-language films. Goldstein has personally written subtitles for five of the company's releases. In 2018, he made a short film called The Art of Subtitling, as a supplement to the Criterion/Rialto Blu-ray release of Julien Duvivier's Panic (Panique).

In 2010 Goldstein was nominated by James Billington, Librarian of Congress, to the Board of the National Film Registry.

== Awards ==
Year	Award	Category	Result
1990	New York Film Critics Circle Awards	Special Award	Won
1994	CableAce Awards	International Cultural/Performing Arts Special or Series	Won
2004	Order of Arts and Letters	Chevalier (knight)	Won
2009	San Francisco International Film Festival	Mel Novikoff Award	Won
2012	George Eastman House	Lifetime Achievement in Film (first recipient)	Won

== Filmography ==
Title	Year	Role
Hollywood Out-Takes and Rare Footage	1983	Writer, producer, director (uncredited)
The Nicholas Brothers: We Sing and We Dance	1992	Writer, co-producer
Les Rues de Mean Streets	2011	Writer, producer, director
In the Footsteps of Speedy	2015	Writer, producer, director
The Art of Subtitling	2018	Writer, producer, director
Uncovering The Naked City	2020	Writer, producer, director
Pelham One Two Three: NYC Underground	2021	Writer, producer, director
