= Nada Mourtada-Sabbah =

Secretary-General of the University Leadership Consortium

Nada Mohsen Mourtada-Sabbah is the secretary general of the University Leadership Council, a group working to improve educational opportunities in the United Arab Emirates. She has also served as the vice chancellor for development and alumni affairs of the American University of Sharjah (AUS). She was one of the first faculty members to join AUS when it opened in 1997.

== Education and career ==
Mourtada received a BA in 1991 from the American University in Beirut, where she was the recipient of the Penrose Award which is awarded to the "outstanding graduate of each faculty on the basis of scholarship, character, leadership, and contribution to university life". Mourtada has a PhD in public law from the University of Paris II.

In 1997, Mourtada-Sabbah joined the faculty at the American University of Sharjah (AUS) as an assistant professor; she was later promoted to professor of political science and international studies. She was the chair of the international studies department, and then served in the alumni affairs department. In 2001, Mourtada-Sabbah was the deputy editor-in-chief of the newly-launch Journal of Social Affairs, which aims to link gaps between the Arab world and the West. In 2013, Mourtada-Sabbah was named to the board of trustees for the College of Saint Benedict, a Catholic liberal arts universities in the United States. As of 2022, she is the Secretary-General of the University Leadership Consortium, and in this position she is working to improve academic education in the United Arab Emirates and has defended the advances made by universities in the UAE.

== Work ==
Mourtada-Sabbah is known for her work on the political question, advancing education opportunities in the United Arab Emirates, and her role in advancing the position of women in the United Arab Emirates. She has been quoted in the French media (Le Monde) talking about returning Arab countries to a place of innovation.

In 2011, she addressed a conference hosted by American University of Sharjah (AUS) that examined how Barack Obama's policies effected the Middle East. Her role in generating the idea for this conference was delineated in James Thurber's book Obama in Office.

In 2019 Armstrong Williams hosted a show from the United Arab Emirates for the first time and Mourtada-Sabbah was one of the guests on the show.

== Selected publications ==
Her books include

- Globalization and the Gulf. John W. Fox, Nada Mourtada-Sabbah, Mohammed Al Mutawa. London: Routledge. 2006. ISBN 0-203-96530-2. OCLC 74753151.
  - Reviewed in Middle East Journal, Khaleej Times and Middle East Quarterly
- Fisher, Louis; Mourtada-Sabbah, Nada (2001). Is war power a political question?. Huntington, NY: Novinka Books. ISBN 1-56072-987-2. OCLC 47643029.
- The political question doctrine and the Supreme Court of the United States. Nada Mourtada-Sabbah, Bruce E. Cain. Lanham, MD: Lexington Books. 2007. ISBN 978-0-7391-5912-5. OCLC 608128080.
- Fisher, Louis; Mourtada-Sabbah, Nada (2002). "Adopting In God We Trust as the U.S. National Motto". Journal of Church and State. 44 (4): 682–83. doi:10.1093/jcs/44.4.671 – via HeinOnline.
- Mourtada-Sabbah, Nada (2008). "Media as social matrix in the United Arab Emirates". In Alsharekh, Alanoud; Springborg, Robert; London Middle East Institute (eds.). Popular culture and political identity in the Arab Gulf states. London: Saqi. ISBN 978-0-86356-692-9. OCLC 214308228.
  - Edited book reviewed Al Jadid

== Awards and honors ==
At the American University of Sharjah she has received awards for Excellence in Teaching and Excellence in Service.
