= Four Friends (1981 film) =

1981 film by Arthur Penn

- Original poster
- Directed by: Arthur Penn
- Written by: Steve Tesich
- Produced by: Michael Tolan; Gene Lasko; Julia Miles; Arthur Penn
- Starring: Craig Wasson; Jodi Thelen; Michael Huddleston; Jim Metzler
- Cinematography: Ghislain Cloquet
- Edited by: Marc Laub; Barry Malkin
- Music by: Elizabeth Swados
- Production companies: Cinema 77; Filmways; Florin; Geria Productions
- Distributed by: Filmways Pictures
- Release date: December 11, 1981
- Running time: 114 minutes
- Country: United States
- Language: English
- Budget: $10 million

Four Friends is a 1981 American comedy-drama film directed by Arthur Penn. The semi-autobiographical screenplay by Steve Tesich follows the title characters from 1961 to 1969, beginning with their senior year of high school. The cast features Craig Wasson, Jodi Thelen, Jim Metzler and Glenne Headly.

== Plot ==
Yugoslavian-born Danilo Prozor arrives in the US at the age of 12 and lives in Chicago with his blue-collar parents. In 1961, he is a high school senior with a few close friends: David, Tom, and Georgia. David worries he will end up an mortician, like his father. The free-spirited Georgia dreams of being a famous dancer. Danilo wants to go to college, but his father expects him to get a job and considers his ambitions to be arrogant.

All three of the boys love Georgia, who is increasingly flirtatious with them. Georgia asks Danilo to take her virginity, but he nervously declines and she is deeply upset. Later on, Danilo discovers Georgia having sex with Tom in the woods.

Danilo leaves town to attend college where he befriends his roommate, Louie Carnahan. Physically disabled and in declining health (his condition is never specified), he wants to live long enough to see men land on the moon. Meanwhile, Georgia is in a relationship with Tom, and David becomes a mortician.

Danilo applies to graduate school. Louie is frustrated that his disability prevents him from having a normal sex life. Danilo begins dating Louie’s sister, Adrienne. Georgia becomes pregnant with Tom’s baby. Since he doesn’t want to get married, she marries David instead. Danilo is upset that he wasn’t told about the situation before the wedding, causing a rift between him and Georgia. Tom joins the military and goes to fight in Vietnam.

Louie and Adrienne bring Danilo to their family mansion on Long Island. Their wealthy father, Mr. Carnahan, criticizes Danilo for being a philosophy major and not fighting in the war. Danilo announces that he and Adrienne are getting married.

Danilo visits David and meets Georgia’s son, Isador (named after her idol Isadora Duncan). Georgia has left David, but he is “used to it,” and believes that she’ll come back. Meanwhile, Georgia shows up at Danilo’s college dorm, where she and Louie have a sexual encounter.

After graduating from college, Danilo drives to the Carnahan estate for his wedding. During the trip, a high school friend invites Danilo to follow the Freedom Riders to Mississippi. He almost accepts, but continues on to the estate.

Before the wedding, it’s insinuated that Mr. Carnahan sexually abuses Adrienne. Danilo and her are married in a lavish ceremony. At the reception, Mr. Carnahan says he "refuses to lose a daughter." He shoots Adrienne in a murder-suicide. Danilo is injured, but survives.

After recovering from his injuries, Danilo learns that Louie has died from his illness. A broken man, he moves to New York City and becomes a taxi driver. He runs into Georgia, who now lives a bohemian lifestyle in the city. He confesses his love for her, but she rejects him.

Danilo moves to Pennsylvania, works at a steel mill, and starts to date again. After Georgia witnesses a fatal car accident, she shows up at his house, claiming she wants to be with him. However, she changes her mind after seeing how normal and unexciting his life is, and leaves. Devastated, Danilo breaks up with his girlfriend and moves again.

Temporarily returning to Chicago, he catches up with Tom and David, both of whom are now married. Danilo watches the Apollo 11 moon landing on TV and thinks of Louie. He reconciles with Georgia and they become a couple. Danilo’s parents decide to return to Yugoslavia. Before they leave, he makes peace with his father. Danilo gets a job teaching English at Bessie Tift College and Georgia plans to go with him. However, she wants to eventually move again, and she says that she'll pick the next place they go.

== Cast ==
- Craig Wasson as Danilo Prozor
- Jodi Thelen as Georgia Miles
- Michael Huddleston as David
- Jim Metzler as Tom
- Miklos Simon as Mr. Prozor
- Elizabeth Lawrence as Mrs. Prozor
- Reed Birney as Louie Carnahan
- Julia Murray as Adrienne Carnahan
- James Leo Herlihy as Mr. Carnahan
- Lois Smith as Mrs. Carnahan
- Glenne Headly as Lola

== Soundtrack ==
The credited soundtrack is:

- "Georgia on My Mind" by Hoagy Carmichael and Stuart Gorrell, performed by Ray Charles
- "Theme from Bonanza" by Jay Livingston and Ray Evans
- "Hit the Road Jack" by Percy Mayfield, performed by the cast
- "Shop Around" by Berry Gordy and Smokey Robinson
- "Blue Moon" by Richard Rodgers and Lorenz Hart, performed by The Marcels
- "The Third Man Theme" by Anton Karas, performed by Guy Lombardo & His Royal Canadians
- "Rico Vacilon" music by Rozando Ruiz[sic], performed by the Arthur Murray Orchestra
- "Mr. Blah-Blah" by Ray Barretto
- "La Moderna" by Gilbert Lopez, performed by Ray Barretto
- "Let Me Prove (My Love for You)" by written by Jimmy Key, performed by Dave Dudley

The Symphony No. 9 (Dvořák) (also known as New World Symphony) plays multiple times in the film but is not credited.

== Production ==
The film was shot on location in Chicago, Evanston, and Lake Forest, Illinois, as well as New York City, the state of Indiana. Additionally, the film's credits thank the East Chicago School System, the city of Chicago, and the Fort Wayne Historical Railroad Society.

During casting, Jodi Thelin recalled doing six interviews with Arthur Penn before being cast in the part. Penn worried about Thelin's young age during the auditions, as she was about 17 years old. He was convinced to cast her based on Thelin's screentests.

== Reception ==
In his review in The New York Times, Vincent Canby called it "the best film yet made about the sixties" and added, "It has the quality of legend, a fable remembered . . . [It] is one of Mr. Penn's most deeply felt achievements, ranking alongside Bonnie and Clyde, Alice's Restaurant, and Little Big Man. For Mr. Tesich, it is another original work by one of our best young screenwriters."

Roger Ebert of the Chicago Sun-Times described it as "a very good movie" and commented, "The wonder is not that Four Friends covers so much ground, but that it makes many of its scenes so memorable that we learn more even about the supporting characters than we expect to."

TV Guide rated the film three out of five stars, saying it "attempts to cover so much ground that at times the film becomes frustratingly muddled", and adding, "Though [it] runs out of gas toward the end, it's filmed with obvious love for the characters and features outstanding performances from the underrated Wasson, Thelen and Simon. Well worth seeing."

Time Out New York wrote, "Although its episodic narrative entails a certain lack of unity, it's nevertheless an ambitious and impressive work . . . A dense but never pretentious film that manages to convey the atmosphere of the '50s and '60s succinctly, it offers delights galore, not least a light, perceptive wit and an unsentimental ability to touch the emotions."

Channel 4 calls it a "stodgy, sentimental brew" and "a well-meaning film that doesn't really amount to much in the long run."

The film was a commercial failure and Penn did not make another film for four years.

== Home media ==
Four Friends was released on DVD by MGM Home Video on August 23, 2005 in widescreen and Dolby stereo.
