= Mavie Österreicher =

Austrian tennis player

- Country (sports): Austria
- Born: 5 April 2002 (age 24)
- Prize money: $24,328

Singles
- Career record: 96–70
- Career titles: 0
- Highest ranking: No. 890 (12 June 2023)
- Current ranking: No. 1134 (20 July 2026)

Doubles
- Career record: 36–28
- Career titles: 3 ITF
- Highest ranking: No. 699 (20 July 2026)
- Current ranking: No. 699 (20 July 2026)
- Last updated on: 24 July 2026.

Mavie Österreicher (born 5 April 2002) is an Austrian tennis player.

Österreicher has a career-high ITF junior combined ranking of 194, achieved on 8 July 2019. On 20 July 2026, she reached her best WTA ranking as a professional of No. 699 in doubles.

Österreicher made her WTA Tour main-draw debut at the 2018 Upper Austria Ladies Linz in the doubles draw, partnering with Nadja Ramskogler.

== ITF Circuit finals ==
=== Doubles: 5 (3 titles, 2 runner-ups) ===
Legend
W35 tournaments
W15 tournaments

Result	W–L	Date	Tournament	Tier	Surface	Partner	Opponents	Score
Loss	0–1	Dec 2022	ITF Oberpullendorf, Austria	W15	Hard (i)	(Austria) Arabella Koller	(Canada) Mia Kupres; Ksenia Laskutova	5–7, 5–7
Win	1–1	Nov 2024	ITF Monastir, Tunisia	W15	Hard	(Germany) Josy Daems	(France) Laïa Petretic (France) Alice Soulié	2–6, 6–3, [10–6]
Win	2–1	Aug 2025	ITF Monastir, Tunisia	W15	Hard	(Italy) Caterina Odorizzi	(United Kingdom) Lauryn John-Baptiste (Serbia) Elena Milovanović	6–4, 2–6, [12–10]
Win	3–1	Oct 2025	ITF Bol, Croatia	W15	Clay	(Romania) Patricia Georgiana Goina	(Czech Republic) Nikola Břečková (France) Cindy Langlais	6–3, 6–2
Loss	3–2	May 2026	ITF Klagenfurt, Austria	W35	Clay	(Bulgaria) Denislava Glushkova	(Netherlands) Jasmijn Gimbrère (Greece) Sapfo Sakellaridi	0–6, 0–6

== ITF Junior finals ==
Category G1
Category G2
Category G3
Category G4
Category G5

=== Singles (4–4) ===
Outcome	No.	Date	Tournament	Grade	Surface	Opponent	Score
Runner-up	1.	8 July 2017	Nairobi, Kenya	G5	Clay	(Gabon) Célestine Avomo	4–6, 4–6
Runner-up	2.	15 July 2017	Nairobi, Kenya	G5	Clay	(India) Vineetha Mummadi	6–3, 1–6, 2–6
Winner	1.	3 September 2017	Bucharest, Romania	G5	Clay	(Spain) Gabriela Martinez Asensi	6–2, 6–4
Winner	2.	1 October 2017	Nabeul, Tunisia	G5	Clay	(Slovakia) Adriana Šenkárová	6–1, 6–3
Runner-up	3.	9 June 2018	Larnaca, Cyprus	G4	Clay	(Cyprus) Eleni Louka	4–6, 6–7^{(2)}
Runner-up	4.	15 July 2018	Wels, Austria	G4	Clay	(Germany) Nastasja Schunk	6–2, 3–6, 5–7
Winner	3.	4 August 2018	Leiria, Portugal	G4	Clay	(Italy) Matilde Paoletti	6–4, 6–4
Winner	4.	8 June 2019	Larnaca, Cyprus	G4	Clay	(Austria) Elena Karner	6–4, 6–3

=== Doubles (1–5) ===
Outcome	No.	Date	Tournament	Grade	Surface	Partner	Opponents	Score
Runner-up	1.	2 September 2017	Nairobi, Kenya	G5	Clay	(Tunisia) Sarra Ata	(Gabon) Célestine Avomo (Burundi) Aisha Niyonkuru	4–6, 6–7^{(5)}
Runner-up	2.	27 August 2017	Clermont-Ferrand, France	G4	Clay	(Austria) Sinja Kraus	(France) Flavie Brugnone (France) Anaëlle Leclercq	4–6, 6–7^{(3)}
Winner	1.	7 January 2018	Stockholm, Sweden	G4	Hard (i)	(Poland) Martyna Kubka	(Russia) Julia Avdeeva (Russia) Maria Bondarenko	6–7^{(5)}, 6–4, [10–7]
Runner-up	3.	4 August 2018	Leiria, Portugal	G4	Clay	(Romania) Carmen Manu	(Italy) Matilde Paoletti (Italy) Asia Serafini	6–2, 4–6, [4–10]
Runner-up	4.	18 May 2019	Tribuswinkel, Austria	G2	Clay	(Poland) Aleksandra Jelen	(United States) Gabriella Price (United States) Katrina Scott	1–6, 6–1, [8–10]
Runner-up	5.	8 June 2019	Larnaca, Cyprus	G4	Clay	(Cyprus) Eleni Louka	(United Kingdom) Esther Adeshina (United Kingdom) Charlotte Russell	7–5, 5–7, [9–11]
