= Nadja Ramskogler =

Austrian tennis player

- Country (sports): Austria
- Born: 4 June 2000 (age 24)

Singles
- Career record: 8–6
- Career titles: 0

Doubles
- Career record: 0–2
- Career titles: 0
- Last updated on: 8 October 2018.

Nadja Ramskogler (born 4 June 2000) is an Austrian tennis player.

Ramskogler has a career high ITF junior combined ranking of 1970 achieved on 18 January 2016.

Ramskogler made her WTA main draw debut at the 2018 Upper Austria Ladies Linz in the doubles draw partnering Mavie Österreicher.
