= 1821 in Iran =

- Decades
- See also: Other events of 1821; Years in Iran

The following lists events that happened during 1821 in Qajar era.

== Incumbents ==
- Monarch: Fath-Ali Shah Qajar
