= Cézia =

Commune in eastern France up to 2019

- Part of Saint-Hymetière-sur-Valouse
- Location of Cézia
- Location within France Location within Bourgogne-Franche-Comté
- Coordinates: 46°21′40″N 5°34′32″E
- Country: France
- Region: Bourgogne-Franche-Comté
- Department: Jura
- Arrondissement: Lons-le-Saunier
- Canton: Moirans-en-Montagne
- Commune: Saint-Hymetière-sur-Valouse
- Area^{1}: 3.60 km^{2} (1.39 sq mi)
- Highest elevation: 802 m (2,631 ft)
- Lowest elevation: 458 m (1,503 ft)
- Population (2016): 69
  - Density: 19/km^{2} (50/sq mi)
- Time zone: UTC+01:00 (CET)
  - Summer (DST): UTC+02:00 (CEST)
- Postal code: 39240
- ^{1} French Land Register data, which excludes lakes, ponds, glaciers > 1 km^{2} (0.386 sq mi or 247 acres) and river estuaries.

Cézia (French pronunciation: [sezja]) is a former commune in the Jura department in Bourgogne-Franche-Comté in eastern France. On 1 January 2019, it was merged into the new commune Saint-Hymetière-sur-Valouse.

== See also ==
- Communes of the Jura department
