= Chemilla =

- Part of Saint-Hymetière-sur-Valouse
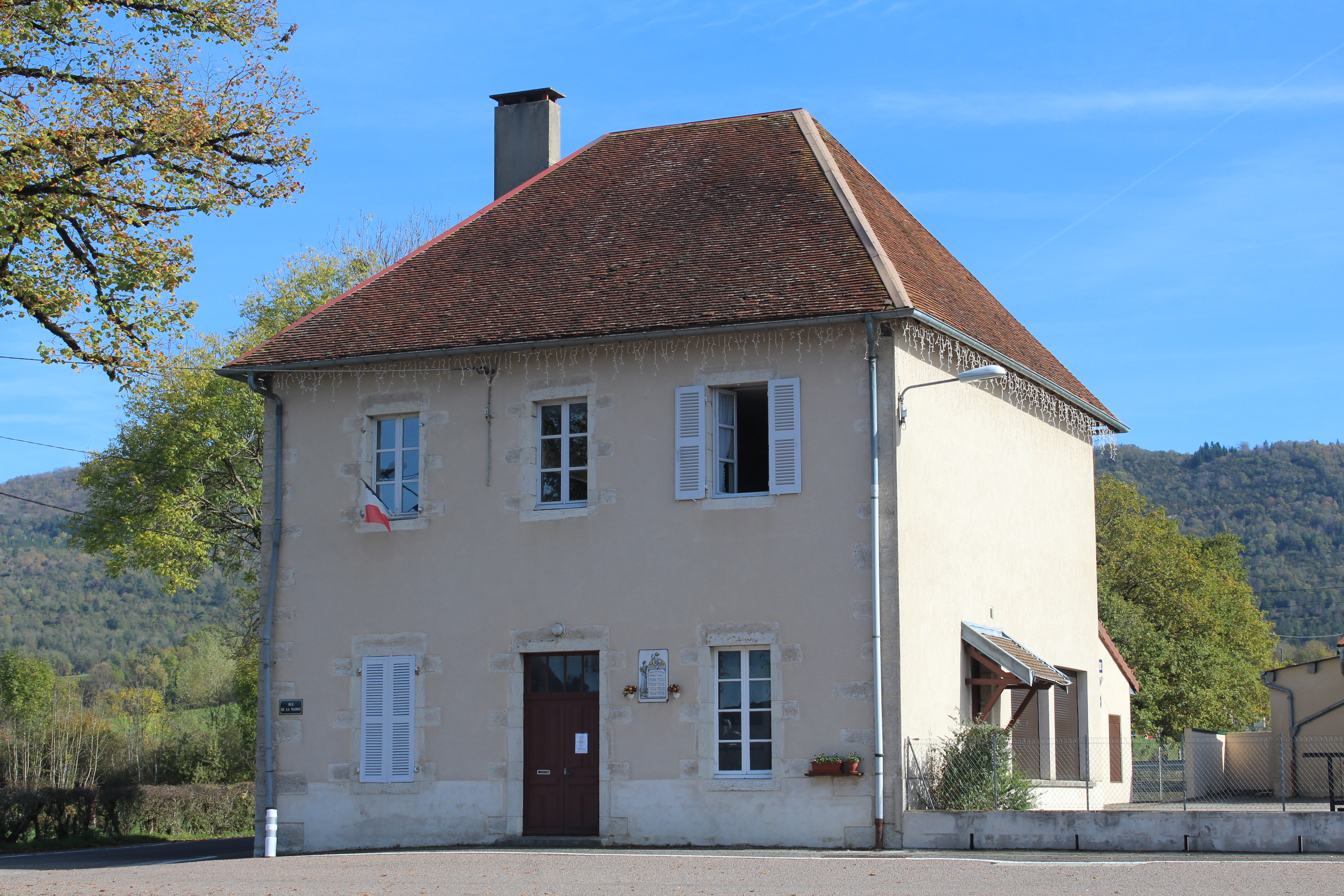
- Town hall
- Location of Chemilla
- Location within France Location within Bourgogne-Franche-Comté
- Coordinates: 46°21′29″N 5°33′38″E
- Country: France
- Region: Bourgogne-Franche-Comté
- Department: Jura
- Arrondissement: Lons-le-Saunier
- Canton: Moirans-en-Montagne
- Commune: Saint-Hymetière-sur-Valouse
- Area^{1}: 1.87 km^{2} (0.72 sq mi)
- Highest elevation: 521 m (1,709 ft)
- Lowest elevation: 322 m (1,056 ft)
- Population (2016): 114
  - Density: 61.0/km^{2} (158/sq mi)
- Time zone: UTC+01:00 (CET)
  - Summer (DST): UTC+02:00 (CEST)
- Postal code: 39240
- ^{1} French Land Register data, which excludes lakes, ponds, glaciers > 1 km^{2} (0.386 sq mi or 247 acres) and river estuaries.

Chemilla (French pronunciation: [ʃəmija]) is a former commune in the Jura department in Bourgogne-Franche-Comté in eastern France. On 1 January 2019, it was merged into the new commune Saint-Hymetière-sur-Valouse.

== See also ==
- Communes of the Jura department
