= Saint-Hymetière =

Commune in Jura, France

- Part of Saint-Hymetière-sur-Valouse
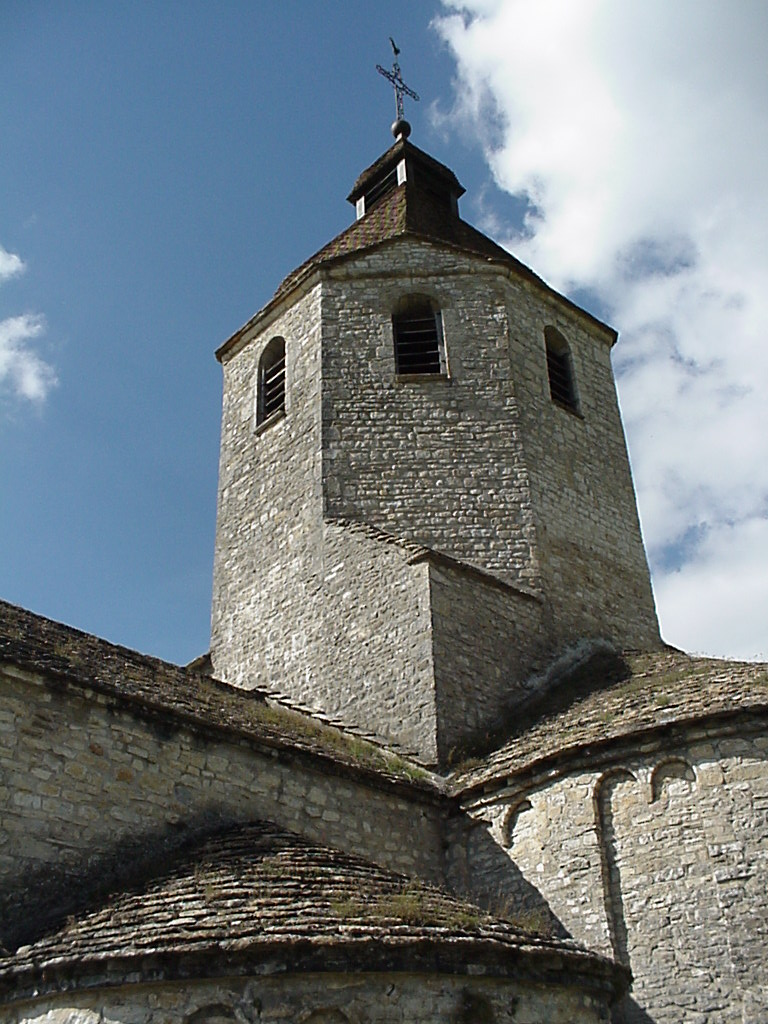
- Location of Saint-Hymetière
- Location within France Location within Bourgogne-Franche-Comté
- Coordinates: 46°21′37″N 5°33′29″E
- Country: France
- Region: Bourgogne-Franche-Comté
- Department: Jura
- Arrondissement: Lons-le-Saunier
- Canton: Moirans-en-Montagne
- Commune: Saint-Hymetière-sur-Valouse
- Area^{1}: 3.32 km^{2} (1.28 sq mi)
- Highest elevation: 464 m (1,522 ft)
- Lowest elevation: 325 m (1,066 ft)
- Population (2016): 105
  - Density: 31.6/km^{2} (81.9/sq mi)
- Time zone: UTC+01:00 (CET)
  - Summer (DST): UTC+02:00 (CEST)
- Postal code: 39240
- ^{1} French Land Register data, which excludes lakes, ponds, glaciers > 1 km^{2} (0.386 sq mi or 247 acres) and river estuaries.

Saint-Hymetière (French pronunciation: [sɛ̃.t‿imtjɛʁ]) is a former commune in the Jura department in the Bourgogne-Franche-Comté region in eastern France. On 1 January 2019, it was merged into the new commune Saint-Hymetière-sur-Valouse.

== See also ==
- Communes of the Jura department
