= Saint-Hymetière-sur-Valouse =

Commune in Bourgogne-Franche-Comté, France

- Commune
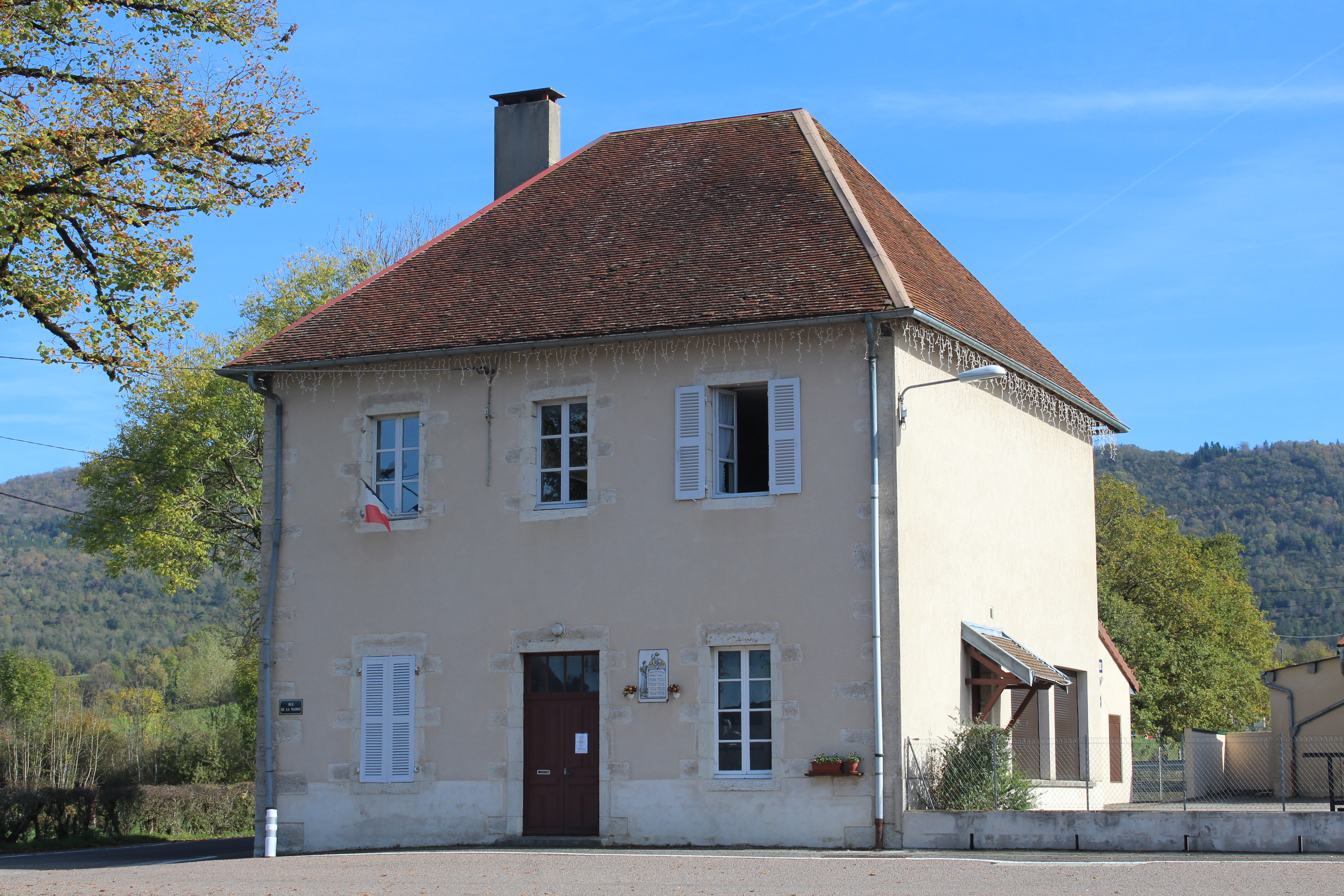
- The town hall in Saint-Hymetière-sur-Valouse
- Location of Saint-Hymetière-sur-Valouse
- Location within France Location within Bourgogne-Franche-Comté
- Coordinates: 46°21′29″N 5°33′38″E
- Country: France
- Region: Bourgogne-Franche-Comté
- Department: Jura
- Arrondissement: Lons-le-Saunier
- Canton: Moirans-en-Montagne
- Area^{1}: 18.30 km^{2} (7.07 sq mi)
- Highest elevation: 802 m (2,631 ft)
- Lowest elevation: 320 m (1,050 ft)
- Population (2023): 409
  - Density: 22.3/km^{2} (57.9/sq mi)
- Time zone: UTC+01:00 (CET)
  - Summer (DST): UTC+02:00 (CEST)
- INSEE/Postal code: 39137 /39240
- ^{1} French Land Register data, which excludes lakes, ponds, glaciers > 1 km^{2} (0.386 sq mi or 247 acres) and river estuaries.

Saint-Hymetière-sur-Valouse is a commune in the Jura department in Bourgogne-Franche-Comté in eastern France. It was established on 1 January 2019 by merger of the former communes of Chemilla (the seat), Cézia, Lavans-sur-Valouse and Saint-Hymetière.

== See also ==
- Communes of the Jura department
