= Georges Ferréol Vuitton =

French designer; son of Louis Vuitton

- Born: 13 July 1857; Asnières-sur-Seine, France
- Died: 26 October 1936 (aged 79); Asnières-sur-Seine, France
- Occupations: Designer and head of Louis Vuitton
- Predecessor: Louis Vuitton (father)
- Successor: Gaston Vuitton (son)
- Spouse(s): Josephine Vuitton, née Patrelle
- Children: 5

Georges Ferréol Vuitton (French pronunciation: [ʒɔʁʒ feʁeɔl vɥitɔ̃]; 13 July 1857 – 26 October 1936) was the only child of Louis Vuitton (1821–1892; French designer and trunk maker for Empress Eugénie de Montijo) and Clemence-Emilie Vuitton, who succeeded his father as head of the Louis Vuitton brand, which is now a brand under the umbrella of the parent company LVMH. Georges is commonly known for his creation of the widely-used LV monogram canvas print, created as an homage to his father and to combat counterfeits. He is also known for making Louis Vuitton products available to purchase internationally. After Georges Vuitton's death in 1936, his son Gaston Louis Vuitton (1883–1970) succeeded him as head of the Vuitton brand.

== Early life ==
When the French designer Louis Vuitton (son of Trunk maker Xavier Vuitton and Corrine Gaillard from the Jura region of Eastern France) was 35 years old, his wife Clemence-Emilie Vuitton gave birth to their first son and child Georges Ferreol Vuitton on 13 July 1857 in Asnières-sur-Seine where the brand Louis Vuitton was based, until the end of the Franco-Prussian War when the original Vuitton main trunk manufacturing workshop was completely destroyed forcing the young family to move to Paris in 1871 where Georges subsequently lived. Georges was the only child of Louis and Clemence-Emilie Vuitton and quickly began learning the trade his Father practiced- Trunk making for Louis Vuitton. Louis and Clemence-Emilie sent Georges to school in Jersey to learn to speak English as Louis was not comfortable speaking English to his wealthy clients. After Louis Vuitton died aged 70 years old on 27 February 1892, and then his son Georges took over as the head of the luxury trunk and bag making business and was the first Vuitton man to bring the brand out of France and onto the global stage by showing it off at the Chicago World Fair in 1893.

== Career ==
Throughout Georges Ferréol Vuitton's life as the head of Louis Vuitton, he created and changed many aspects of the brand. His work aided the brand in becoming one of the most popular French luxury brands and one of the most successful companies owned by parent company LVMH. Georges was the first to bring the brand to the global scene. He created the LV monogram canvas, the Car trunk, innovated on locks that became the Tumbler lock, started the Le Voyage book series, and began giving VIP trunk Vuitton gifts to Louis Vuitton's most loyal customers.

=== LV Monogram Canvas ===
Due to the popularity of the brand, many counterfeit products appeared in France and were sold at much lower prices that reflected their poor craftsmanship. In 1896, in response to counterfeiters, Georges created a complicated pattern that would cover his trunks and reduce counterfeits due to the difficulty in creating the pattern. This resulted in the creation of the LV monogram canvas, which was both a response to counterfeits and a homage to his father Louis Vuitton. This canvas is covered with diamonds, the LV logo, flowers and quatrefoils and other shapes that have become a key part of the brand's image. Despite its creation in 1896, it was not until 1905 that the patent for the LV monogram canvas was granted.

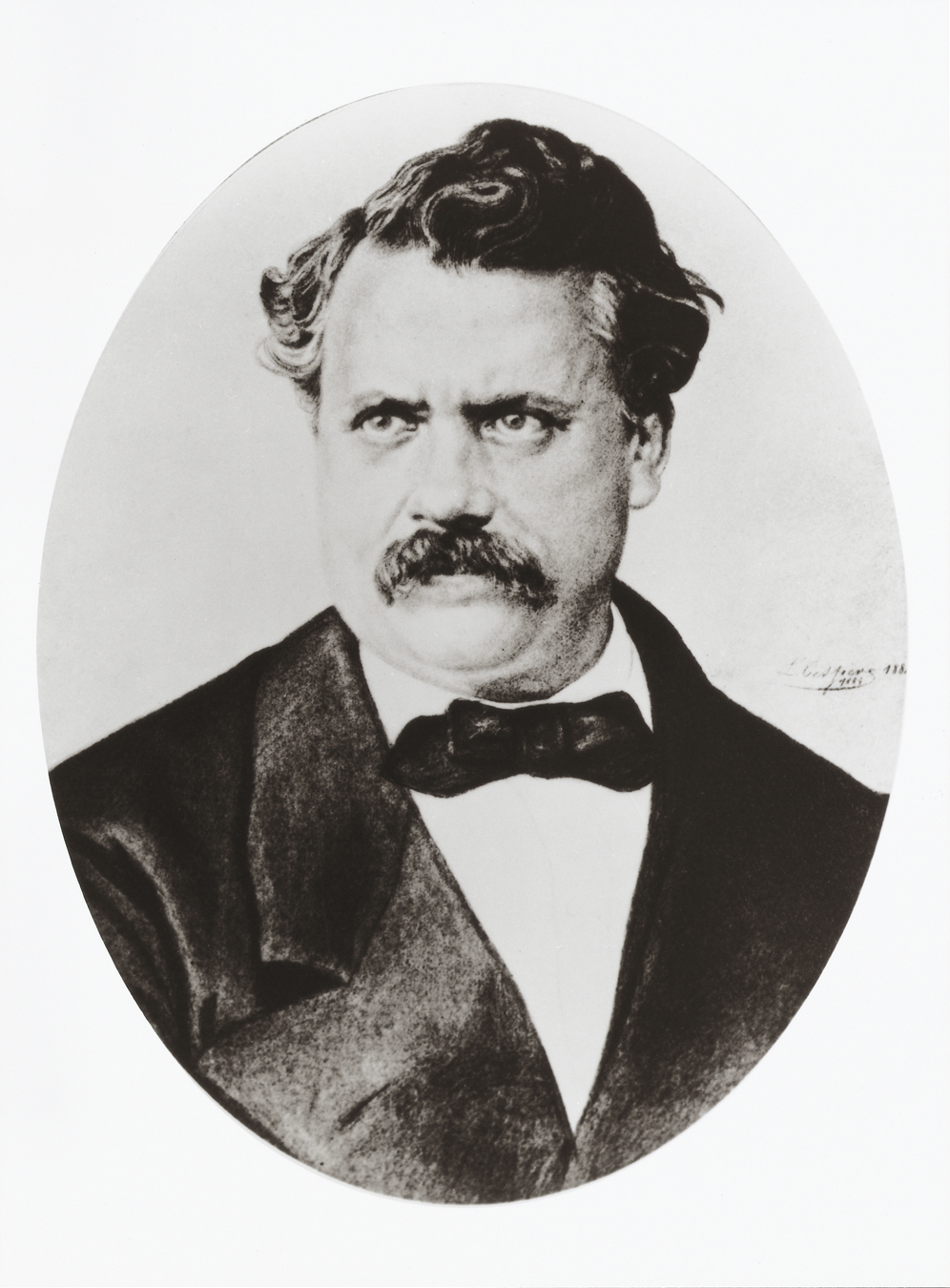
Georges' father Louis Vuitton, founder of the luxury brand.

=== 1897– Car Trunk ===
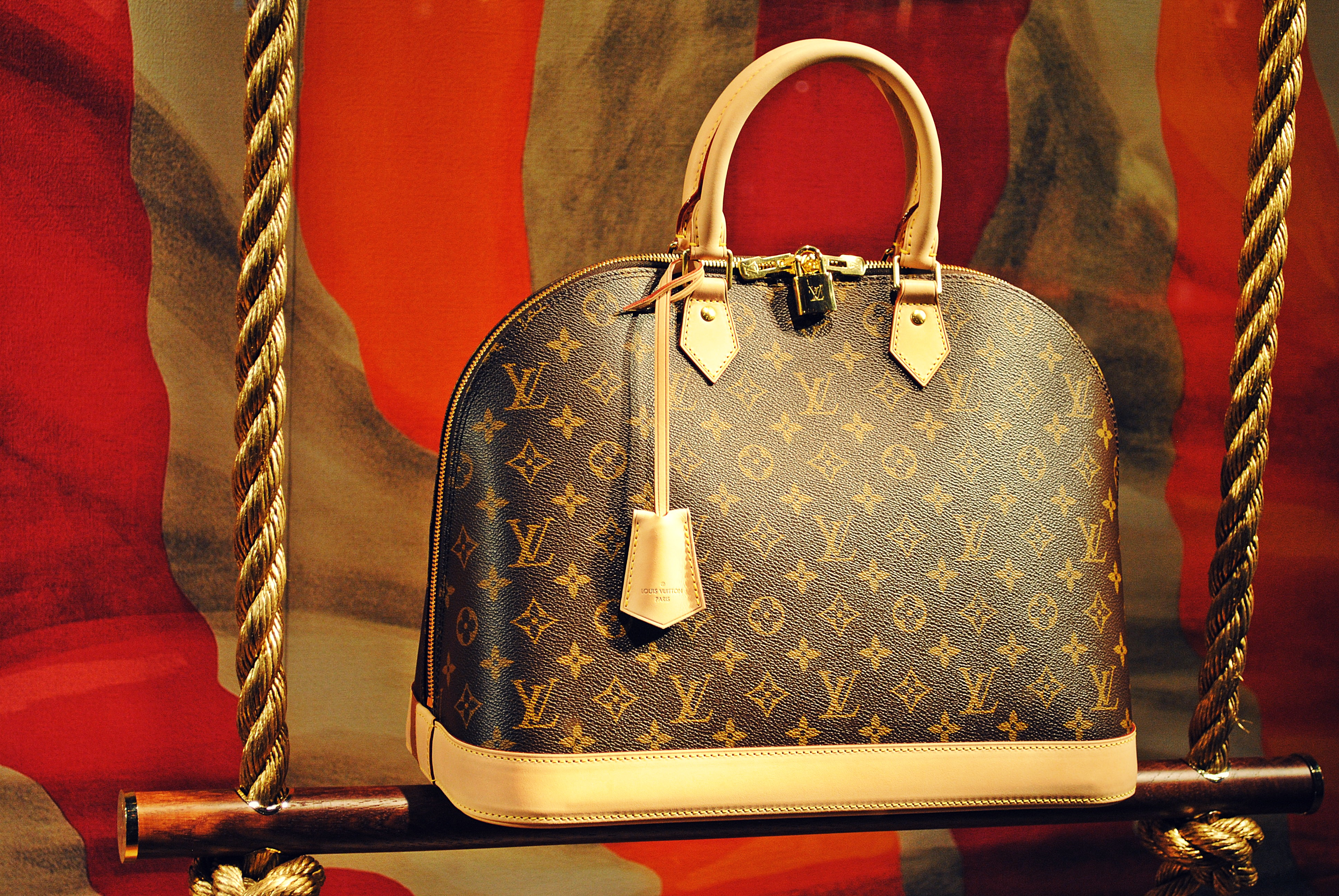
The LV monogram canvas was developed by Georges Vuitton both as a tribute to his father and the brand and to curb the production of counterfeits.

A large part of Georges Ferréol Vuitton's life was his love of automobiles and traveling in them. His interest became an essential point of the Louis Vuitton trunks and how the brand created and innovated on them. Georges saw many trunks that were being made without the idea of them being put into automobiles in mind. He wanted to innovate and change this. He decided that a traveller should be able to travel in a car with the same amount of cargo one could take on a boat or a train, so he created a more sturdy and space-efficient trunk than was previously manufactured. Georges' solution was to use new materials he had not previously used to create his trunks, including a black waterproof cloth that coated every trunk to ensure durability. Louis Vuitton also decided to bevel each closure of the trunk rendering the new trunks not as susceptible to issues caused by rain and dust. Georges understood that in traveling in a car, the trunks need to be stacked on top of each other to use space efficiently, so he revolutionized the creation of trunks by squaring the edges and with flat tops and bottoms, making them perfect for stacking rather than the typical rounded edges that were common at the time. In doing so, Vuitton bought the frame of an automobile (car chassis) so that he could create his own car and he entrusted this mission to multiple different bodybuilders of cars such as Labourdette, Rothschild and Janteaud. He commissioned them to create an automobile that he could then use to match and design his own car trunks. In the year of 1897, Georges Ferréol Vuitton presented the first prototype of the new trunk that he created—the Car trunk. He presented his prototype and ideas at multiple automobile trade shows. During George Ferréol's reign over Louis Vuitton, he also created many other trunks such as the 'Perfect Trunk' for men's changing rooms, and the Louis Vuitton Aero Trunk in 1921 to accompany the creation of Helicopter prototypes by his twin sons Jean and Pierre.

=== The Tumbler Lock ===
In the late 1800s and early 1900s, most travelers used trunks which were the main produce of Louis Vuitton. Unfortunately trunks mostly had an easy lock to pick by burglars who recognized the expensive Louis Vuitton trunks and what may possibly be kept inside by its wealthy owner. To combat this, Georges and his father Louis in 1886 decided to innovate on the lock and create a brand new one. After many years Georges was finally able to patent a lock that was so difficult to pick him and Louis Vuitton invited Harry Houdini to attempt to escape from a Louis Vuitton trunk which had been made with the new lock. Despite Houdini not accepting the challenge, the lock is still effective at its job and the same patented lock is used by Louis Vuitton today in all its trunks. The new lock was coined the revolutionary new 'Tumbler Lock' and contains two spring buckles

=== VIP Gifts – Trunk Vuitton ===
As with most luxury brands, Louis Vuitton does not offer discount prices or rebates to its customers, whether they be new or regular customers. Rather than offering discounts, Georges and his eldest son Gaston-Louis chose to be more generous by gifting loyal and continuing customers with mini Louis Vuitton trunks. The trunks could not be bought or ordered but were gifts given at the choosing of Georges and were delivered to the client's home. The trunks were covered in the typical LV monogram canvas and began around 1910. Inside the canvases, Vuitton would put a bouquet of fresh flowers. The inside of the trunk would contain a zinc tray so as to prevent any damage from water or moisture from the flowers. Receiving these gifts was considered an honor as they were exclusive and could not be bought. After the flowers died, Georges allowed the recipient of the gift to choose how the trunk would be recycled—whether it be for sewing material or as a cigarette box he did not care. Louis Vuitton no longer practices this as the brand has a much larger clientele and continuing to do this would be expensive. Flower trunks, however, are still available as part of their hard-sided collection which can be purchased in-store.

=== Louis Vuitton Book- Le Voyage ===
During George's tenure at the helm of Louis Vuitton, he began what is now a large part of Louis Vuitton's marketing: Le Voyage books. Georges created the first travel book published by Louis Vuitton, which has now turned into a 30-city collection of travel guides, including San Francisco, Hong Kong, Tokyo, Cape Town, Berlin and Amsterdam. A matching mobile app has also been created. Georges' book was published only in French in 1901 and centered on Paris, with three original editions existing each at a length of 294 pages. It is incredibly rare, has dimensions of 165mm x 255mm, and has a preface written by French Journalist and Anarchist, Émile Gautier. Its caption translated into English means: "From the most remote times to the present day". The cover of the book was illustrated and signed by French painter and illustrator Charles Henri Pille (1844–1897) depicting a nineteenth-century love of the Middle Ages, and showing Vuitton as trunk makers.

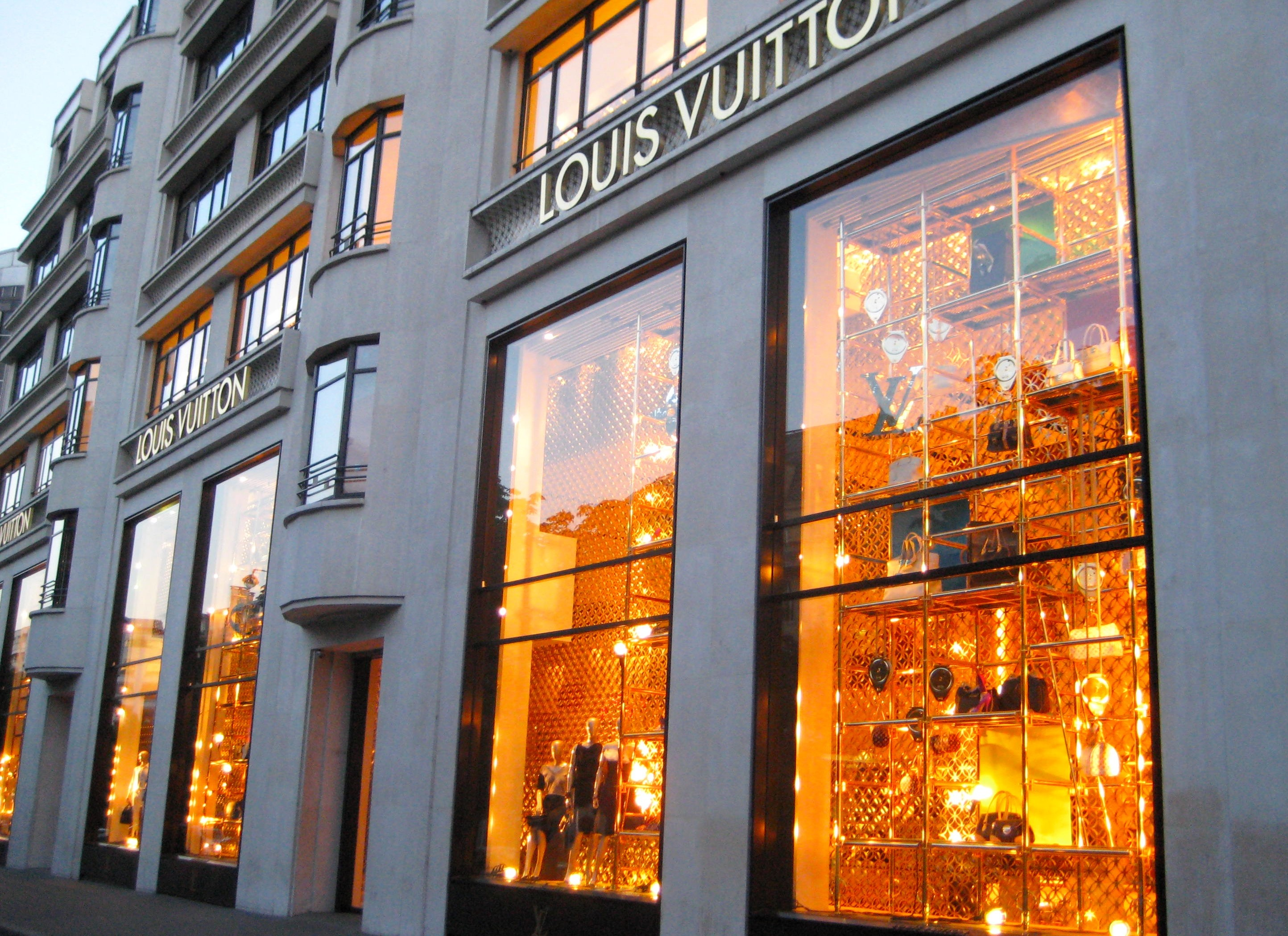
This Champs-Elyseés store was opened under the reign of Georges Vuitton. Coco Chanel was a patron of the store.

== Personal life ==
Despite a busy work life heading the now global luxury leather goods brand Louis Vuitton, Georges Vuitton married Josephine Patrelle (1863–1964) and they were married until his death in 1936. Their children (in chronological order) were Marie Louise, Gaston Louis, the twins Jean and Pierre, and their youngest son Marcel Vuitton. In 1893, a year after founder Louis Vuitton died, Georges and a relative Henry traveled to the United States by boat passing through Ellis Island immigration to travel to the Chicago World Fair to show off their luxury leather goods, making it the first time that Louis Vuitton products were to be displayed and sold outside of France. Records show that Georges and Henry travelled multiple times to the United States passing through the Ellis Island Immigration stop entering the country again in 1897.

Whilst he was still alive, Georges' middle children, who are twins, Jean and Pierre took their love of flying to a new level by creating 3 prototypes for helicopters, naming them Vuitton-Hubert, Vuitton II and Vuitton III all after their father's famous family name. The helicopters were never formally used but were a display of the Vuitton family's creativity.

== Death ==
On 26 October 1936, in Asnières-sur-Seine in France, Georges Ferréol Vuitton died at the age of 79 years old. His wife, Josephine Vuitton (née Patrelle) outlived him and died many years later in 1964 in France. All their children outlived them, with Gaston, the eldest of their sons, taking over the brand after his father's death in 1936, until his own death in 1970 ending the three-generation lead of the Louis Vuitton brand by Vuitton men.
