= Louis Vuitton (designer) =

French malletier (1821–1892)

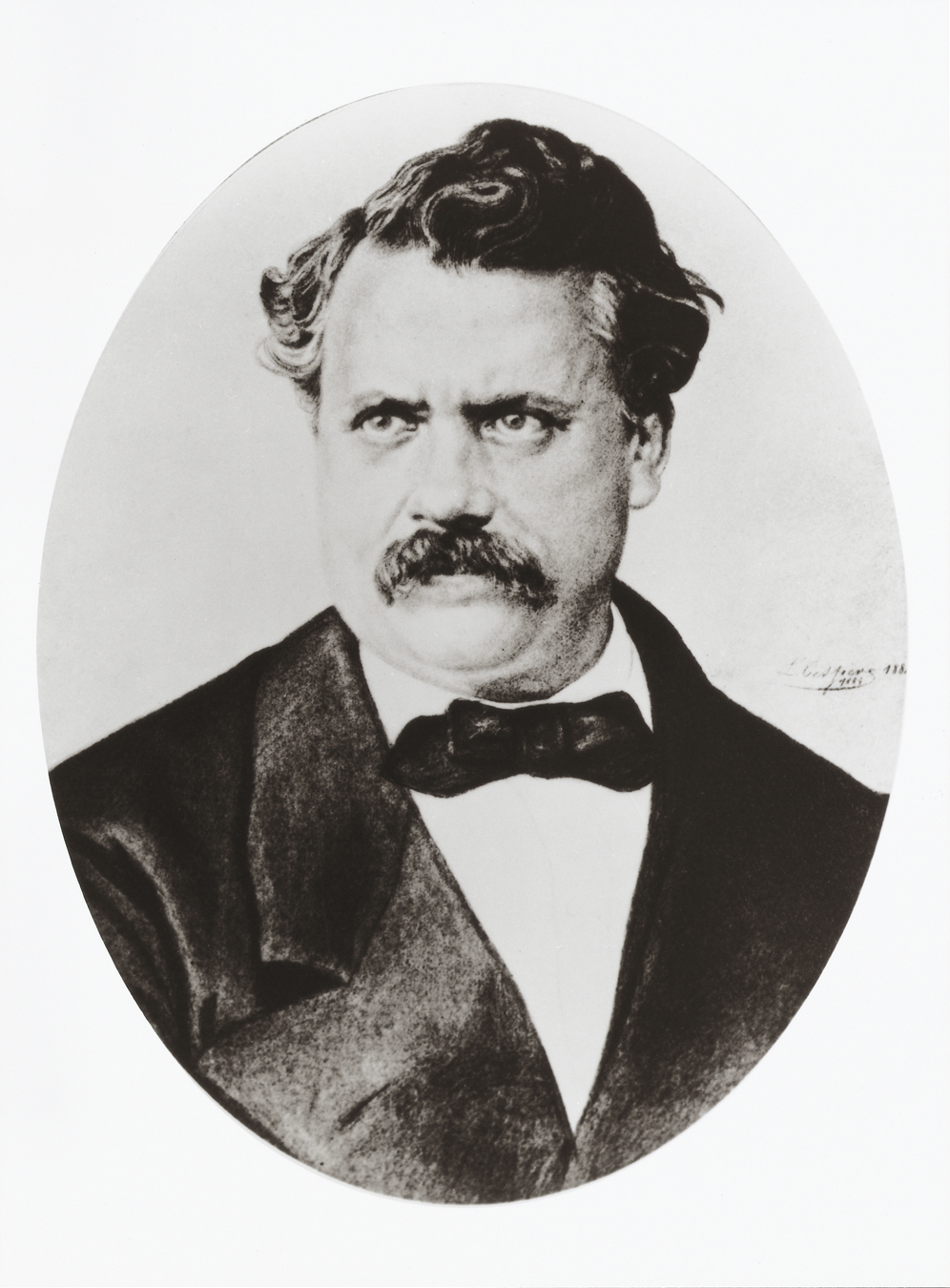
- Born: 4 August 1821; Lavans-sur-Valouse, France
- Died: 27 February 1892 (aged 70); Asnières-sur-Seine, France
- Occupations: Trunk maker; businessman
- Known for: The founder of Louis Vuitton
- Spouse: Clemence-Emilie Parriaux
- Children: Georges Ferréol Vuitton

Louis Vuitton (French: [lwi vɥitɔ̃]; 4 August 1821 – 27 February 1892) was a French malletier and businessman. He was the founder of the Louis Vuitton brand of leather goods now owned by LVMH. Prior to this, he had been appointed as trunk-maker to Eugénie de Montijo, wife of Napoleon III.

== Life and career ==
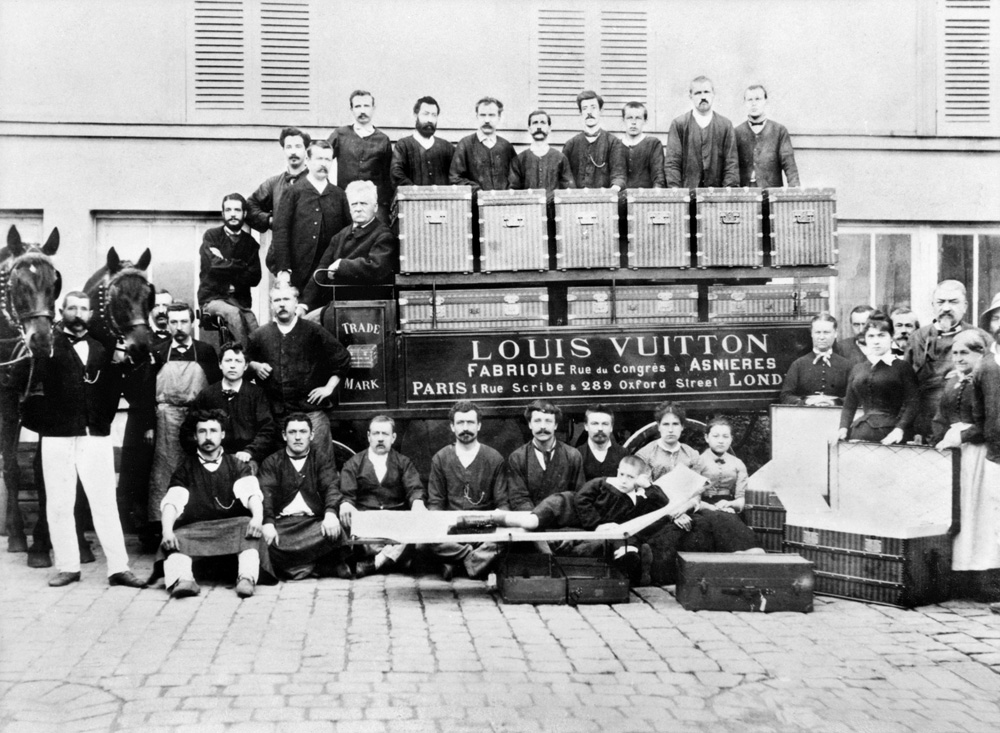
In the courtyard of the Asnières workshops, around 1888, Louis, Georges and Gaston L. Vuitton (sitting on a bed trunk)

Vuitton was born to a family of artisans, carpenters, and farmers in Lavans-sur-Valouse. At the age of 10, his mother, a hat-maker, died, and his father followed soon after. Following a difficult relationship with his adoptive stepmother, Vuitton left his home in Jura, in Franche-Comté in the spring of 1835, at the age of 13. Taking odd jobs along the way, Vuitton traveled approximately 292 miles (470 km) to Paris. Arriving in 1837, in the middle of the Industrial Revolution, he apprenticed under Monsieur Marechal, a successful trunk maker and packer. Within a few years, Vuitton gained a reputation amongst Paris' more fashionable class as one of the city's premier practitioners of the craft.

After the reestablishment of the French Empire under Napoleon III, Vuitton was hired as a personal trunk maker and packer for the Empress Eugenie. She charged him with "packing the most beautiful clothes in a quite exquisite way." This provided Vuitton with a gateway to his other elite and royal clients who provided him with work for the rest of his career.

In 1854, at age 33, Vuitton married 16-year-old Clemence-Emilie Parriaux. Soon after, he left Marechal's shop and opened his own trunk making and packing workshop in Paris. Outside of his shop hung a sign that read: "Securely packs the most fragile objects. Specializing in packing fashions." In 1858, inspired by H.J. Cave & Sons of London, Vuitton introduced his revolutionary rectangular canvas trunks at a time when the market had only rounded-top leather trunks. The demand for Vuitton's durable, lightweight designs spurred his expansion into a larger workshop in Asnières-sur-Seine. The original pattern of the shellac embedded canvas was named "Damier".

Vuitton also designed the world's first pick-proof lock. All lock patterns were safely kept at Vuitton's workrooms and registered with the owner's name in case another key was needed.
