= 1821 =

1821 in various calendars
- Gregorian calendar: 1821; MDCCCXXI
- Ab urbe condita: 2574
- Armenian calendar: 1270; ԹՎ ՌՄՀ
- Assyrian calendar: 6571
- Balinese saka calendar: 1742–1743
- Bengali calendar: 1227–1228
- Berber calendar: 2771
- British Regnal year: 1 Geo. 4 – 2 Geo. 4
- Buddhist calendar: 2365
- Burmese calendar: 1183
- Byzantine calendar: 7329–7330
- Chinese calendar: 庚辰年 (Metal Dragon); 4518 or 4311 — to — 辛巳年 (Metal Snake); 4519 or 4312
- Coptic calendar: 1537–1538
- Discordian calendar: 2987
- Ethiopian calendar: 1813–1814
- Hebrew calendar: 5581–5582
- Hindu calendars
- Vikram Samvat: 1877–1878
- Shaka Samvat: 1742–1743
- Kali Yuga: 4921–4922
- Holocene calendar: 11821
- Igbo calendar: 821–822
- Iranian calendar: 1199–1200
- Islamic calendar: 1236–1237
- Japanese calendar: Bunsei 4 (文政４年)
- Javanese calendar: 1748–1749
- Julian calendar: Gregorian minus 12 days
- Korean calendar: 4154
- Minguo calendar: 91 before ROC 民前91年
- Nanakshahi calendar: 353
- Thai solar calendar: 2363–2364
- Tibetan calendar: ལྕགས་ཕོ་འབྲུག་ལོ་ (male Iron-Dragon); 1947 or 1566 or 794 — to — ལྕགས་མོ་སྦྲུལ་ལོ་ (female Iron-Snake); 1948 or 1567 or 795

March 25 (April 6 in the Julian calendar): Germanos of Patras declares the independence of Greece from the Ottoman Empire to start the Greek War of Independence.

1821 (MDCCCXXI) was a common year starting on Monday of the Gregorian calendar and a common year starting on Saturday of the Julian calendar, the 1821st year of the Common Era (CE) and Anno Domini (AD) designations, the 821st year of the 2nd millennium, the 21st year of the 19th century, and the 2nd year of the 1820s decade. As of the start of 1821, the Gregorian calendar was 12 days ahead of the Julian calendar, which remained in localized use until 1923.

== Events ==
=== January–March ===
- January 21 – Peter I Island in the Antarctic is first sighted, by Fabian Gottlieb von Bellingshausen.
- January 26 – Congress of Laibach convenes to deal with outstanding international issues, particularly the outbreak of a revolution in southern Italy.
- January 28 – Alexander Island, the largest in Antarctica, is first discovered by Fabian Gottlieb von Bellingshausen.
- February 9 – Columbian College in the District of Columbia is chartered by President James Monroe (it becomes George Washington University).
- February 10 – In Mexico, the Embrace of Acatempan takes place between Agustín de Iturbide and Vicente Guerrero, which seals the peace between the viceroyalty troops and the insurgents.
- February 28 – Congress of Laibach formally comes to an end. However the leading participants remain as fresh uprisings break out in Northern Italy and Greece.
- March 7 – The Battle of Rieti is fought in Italy between intervening Austrian forces and Neapolitan rebels.
- March 21 – Austrian forces under Johann Frimont enter Naples and restore the authority of Ferdinand I.

=== April–June ===
- March 25 (O.S.)/April 6 (N.S.) – Metropolitan bishop Germanos of Patras raises the revolutionary flag of Greece at the Monastery of Agia Lavra (according to oral tradition), symbolically marking the beginning of the Greek War of Independence against the Ottoman Empire; later celebrated as Greece's traditional Independence Day.
- April 10 (O.S.)/April 22 (N.S.) – Ecumenical Patriarch Gregory V of Constantinople is blamed by the Ottoman government for being unable to suppress Greek independence, and is hanged outside the main gate of the Patriarchal Cathedral immediately after the celebration of Pascha.
- May 5
  - Emperor Napoleon dies in exile on Saint Helena of stomach cancer.
  - The first edition of the Manchester Guardian newspaper (from 1959 simply The Guardian) is published in England.
- May 8 – Greek War of Independence: At the Battle of Gravia Inn, a 120-man Greek force led by Odysseas Androutsos repulses an Ottoman army of 8,000.
- May 12 – Congress of Laibach finally ends having overseen the successful Austrian intervention in Italy. A planned Congress of Verona in 1822 is agreed as the next meeting.
- June 14 – Egyptian conquest of Sudan (1820–1824): King Badi VII of Sennar surrenders his throne and realm without a fight to Ismail Pasha, general of the Ottoman Empire, ending the existence of the Funj Sultanate in Sudan.
- June 7 (O.S.)/June 19 (N.S.) – Battle of Drăgășani, Wallachia: The Filiki Eteria are decisively defeated by the Ottomans.

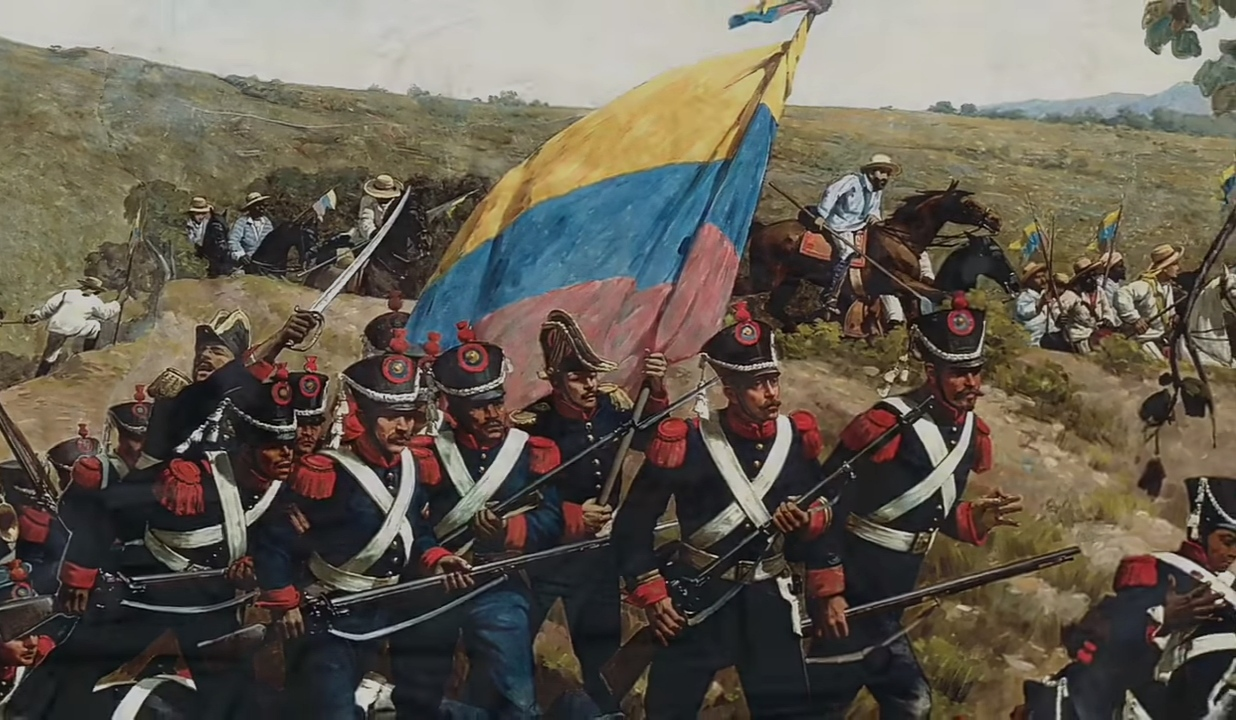
June 24: Battle of Carabobo

- June 24 – Battle of Carabobo: Simón Bolívar wins Venezuela's independence from Spain.

=== July–September ===
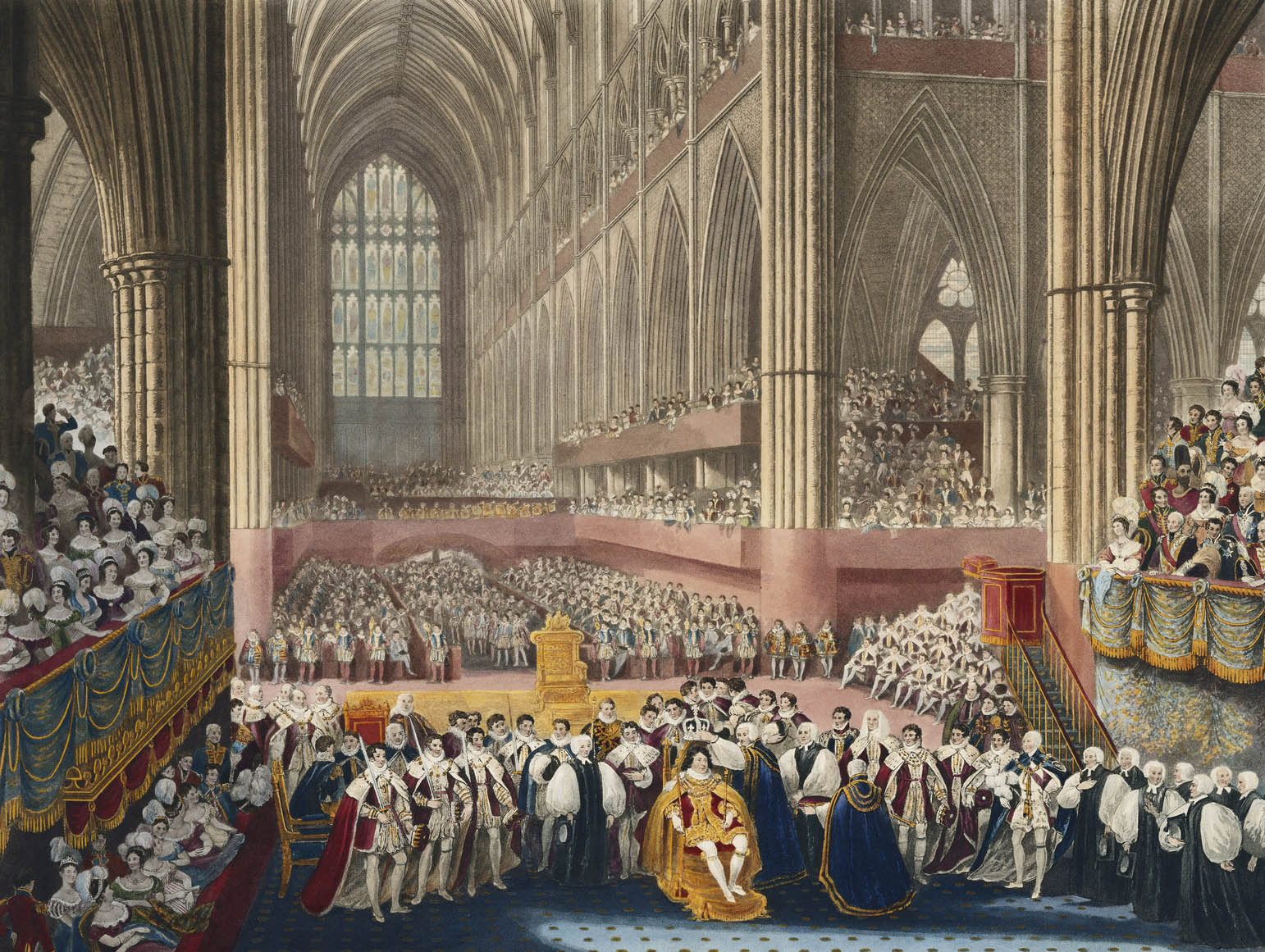
July 19: Coronation of George IV of the United Kingdom

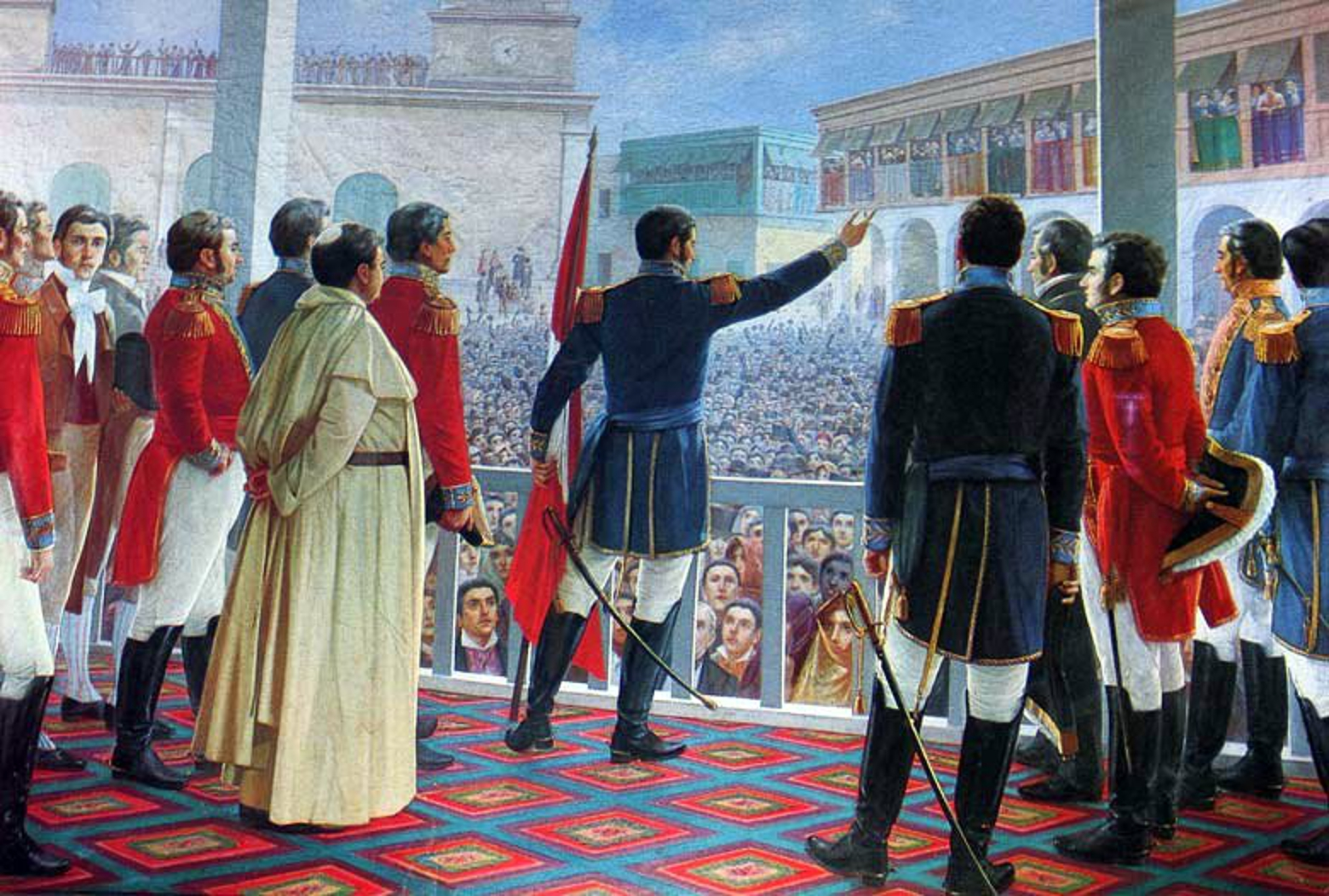
July 28: Proclamation of the Independence of Peru

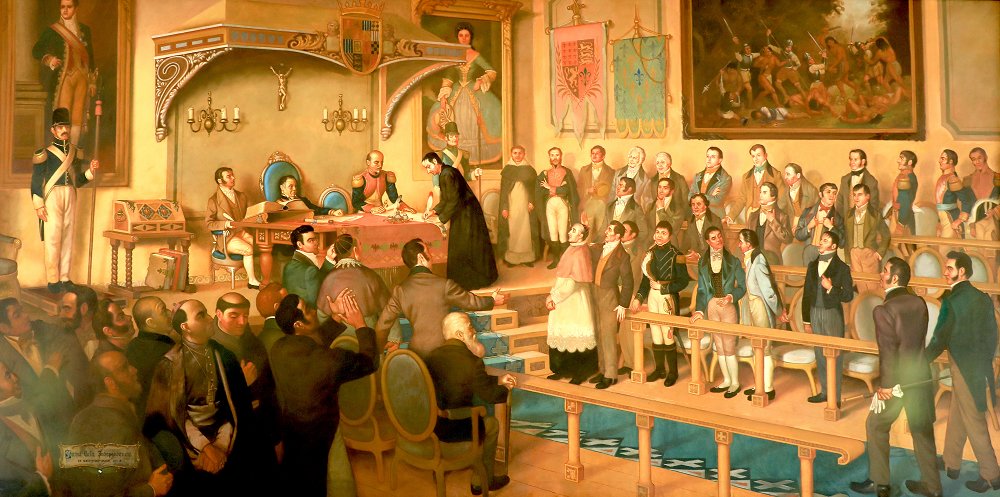
September 15: Declaration of Independence of Central America

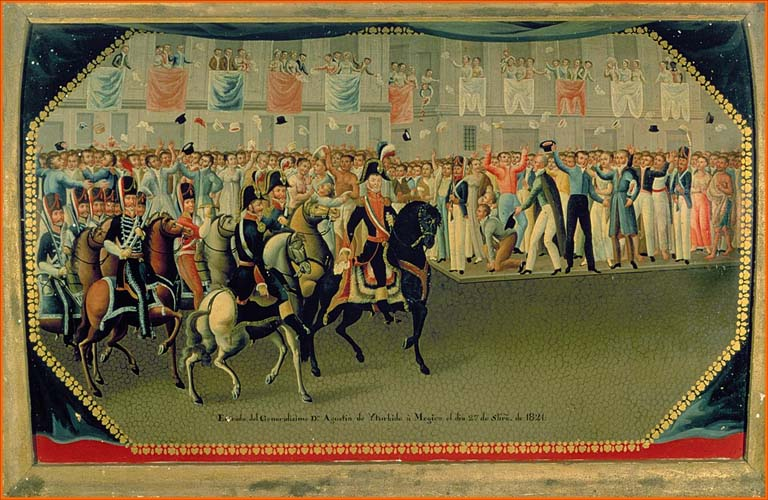
September 27: Entrance of the Army of the Three Guarantees to Mexico City

- July 4 – Return of John VI from Brazil to Portugal who approves on that day the Bases da Constituição.
- July 19 – George IV is crowned King of the United Kingdom of Great Britain and Ireland. His estranged wife, Caroline of Brunswick, is turned away from the ceremony.
- July 28 – Argentine general José de San Martín declares the independence of Peru from the Spanish Empire.
- August 10 – Missouri is admitted as the 24th U.S. state.
- August 7 (O.S.)/August 19 (N.S.) – Navarino massacre: Greek rebels massacre 3,000 inhabitants of the city of Navarino.
- August 21 – Jarvis Island is discovered in the Pacific by the crew of the Eliza Frances.
- August 24 – The Treaty of Córdoba is signed in Córdoba, Veracruz, Mexico, ratifying the Plan of Iguala of February 24 for Mexico's independence from Spain and, although not recognised by the latter, effectively concludes the Mexican War of Independence.
- August 30 – At the Congress of Cúcuta, the Republic of Gran Colombia (a federation covering much of present-day Venezuela, Colombia, Panama, and Ecuador) is established, with Simón Bolívar as the founding President, and Francisco de Paula Santander as vice president.
- September 4 – Chilean general José Miguel Carrera is executed by an Argentinian military tribunal, in the city of Mendoza.
- September 15 – Guatemala, El Salvador, Honduras, Nicaragua and Costa Rica gain independence from Spain by the Act of Independence of Central America. On October 29, the newly independent First Mexican Empire proposes that Guatemala should be annexed with it.
- September 4 (O.S.)/September 16 (N.S.) – Ukase of 1821: Russia proclaims territorial sovereignty over Northwestern North America, modern-day Alaska.
- September 18 – Amherst College is founded in Massachusetts.
- September 27 – The Army of the Three Guarantees enters Mexico City, and the following day the Declaration of Independence of the Mexican Empire from Spain is proclaimed, following the Mexican War of Independence.

=== October–December ===
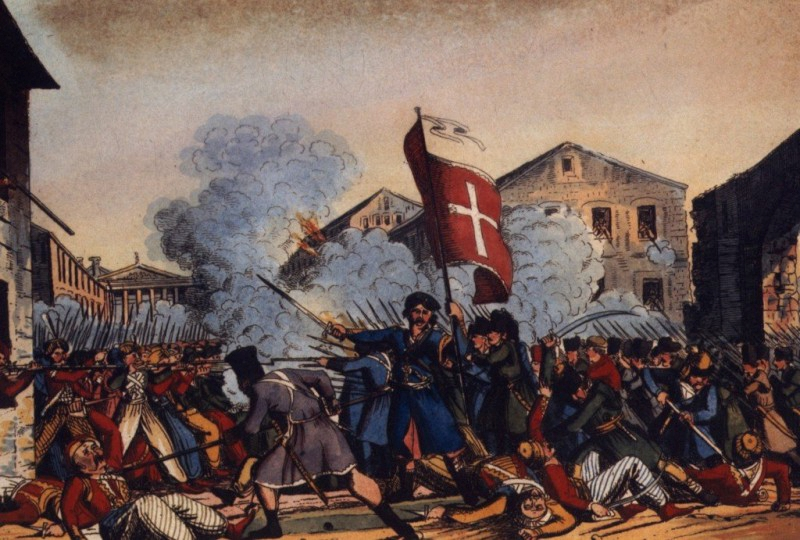
October 5 (September 23 Greek calendar): The Siege of Tripolitsa by Greek rebels is followed by a massacre.

- September 23 (O.S.)/October 5 (N.S.) – The Siege of Tripolitsa ends when Greek rebels capture the city of Tripoli, Greece; the massacre of 8,000 civilians follows. (Greek forces under the command of General Theodoros Kolokotronis have besieged the city for several months during the Greek War of Independence from Turkey and the Ottoman Empire.)
- October 8 (O.S.)/October 20 (N.S.) – Tsar Alexander I of Russia issues an imperial ukase guaranteeing freedom of commerce in Russia by merchants from Persia.
- November 16 – American Old West: The Santa Fe Trail is first used by William Becknell.
- November 28 – Panama declares independence from Spain, joining Gran Colombia.
- December 1 – History of the Dominican Republic: On the Caribbean island of Hispaniola, General José Núñez de Cáceres ends the España Boba era of Spanish rule in the Captaincy General of Santo Domingo by establishing the Republic of Spanish Haiti. It will last for three months before being invaded by Haiti.
- December 6 – The South Orkney Islands are discovered by seal hunters George Powell and Nathaniel Palmer.
- December 15 – The world's first geographical society, the Société de géographie, is established in Paris.
- December 19 – The Eyjafjallajökull volcano in Iceland begins to erupt.

=== Date unknown ===
- The town of Al-Ubayyid, Sudan is established.
- Widener University is founded in Wilmington, Delaware, as The Bullock School for Boys.

== Births ==
=== January–March ===
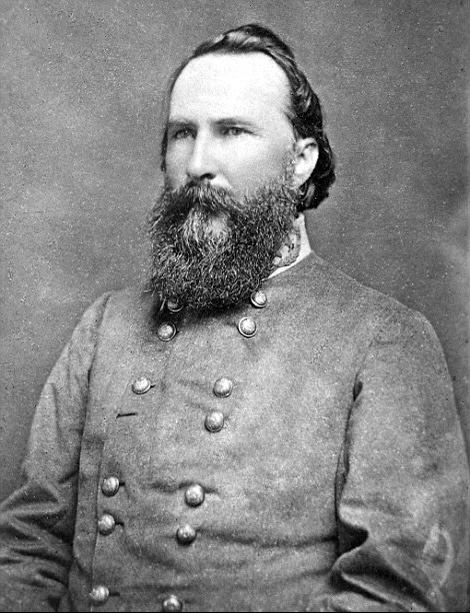
James Longstreet

- January 1 – Francisco de Paula Milán Mexican officier of the Mexican Army (d. 1883)
- January 2 – Catherine Huggins, British actor, singer, director and manager (d. 1887)
- January 8
  - James Longstreet, American Confederate general (d. 1904)
  - W. H. L. Wallace, American Civil War general (d. 1862)
- February 3 – Elizabeth Blackwell, first American female physician (d. 1910)
- February 11 – Auguste Edouard Mariette, French Egyptologist (d. 1881)
- February 17 – Lola Montez, Irish-Spanish dancer, royal mistress (d. 1861)
- February 19
  - Francis Preston Blair Jr., American politician, American Civil War officer (d. 1875)
  - August Schleicher, German linguist (d. 1868)
- March 1 – Joseph Hubert Reinkens, German Old Catholic bishop (d. 1896)
- March 9 – John Watts de Peyster, American author, philanthropist, and soldier (d. 1907)
- March 12 – Sir John Abbott, 3rd Prime Minister of Canada (d. 1893)
- March 31 – Henry Dunning Macleod, Scottish economist (d. 1902)

=== April–June ===
- April 1 – Princess Anka Obrenović, Serbian princess (d. 1868)
- April 3 – Fr. Thomas Pelham Dale, English mystic (d. 1892)
- April 9 – Charles Baudelaire, French poet, writer (d. 1867)
- April 12 – Beauchamp Seymour, British admiral (d. 1895)
- May 6
  - Edmund Colhoun, American admiral (d. 1897)
  - Emilie Hammarskjöld, Swedish-American musician (d. 1854)
- May 8 – William Henry Vanderbilt, American entrepreneur (d. 1885)
- May 16 – Pafnuty Chebyshev, Russian mathematician (d. 1894)
- May 17 – Sebastian Kneipp, German naturopath (d. 1897)
- May 18 – Eduard von Pestel, Prussian military officer and German general (d. 1908)
- May 24 – Juan Bautista Topete, Spanish admiral and politician (d. 1885)
- June 2 – Ion C. Brătianu, 2-Time Prime Minister of Romania (d. 1891)
- June 16 – Old Tom Morris, Scottish golfer (d. 1908)
- June 26 – Bartolomé Mitre, Argentine statesman, military figure, and author, 6th President of Argentina (d. 1906)

=== July–September ===
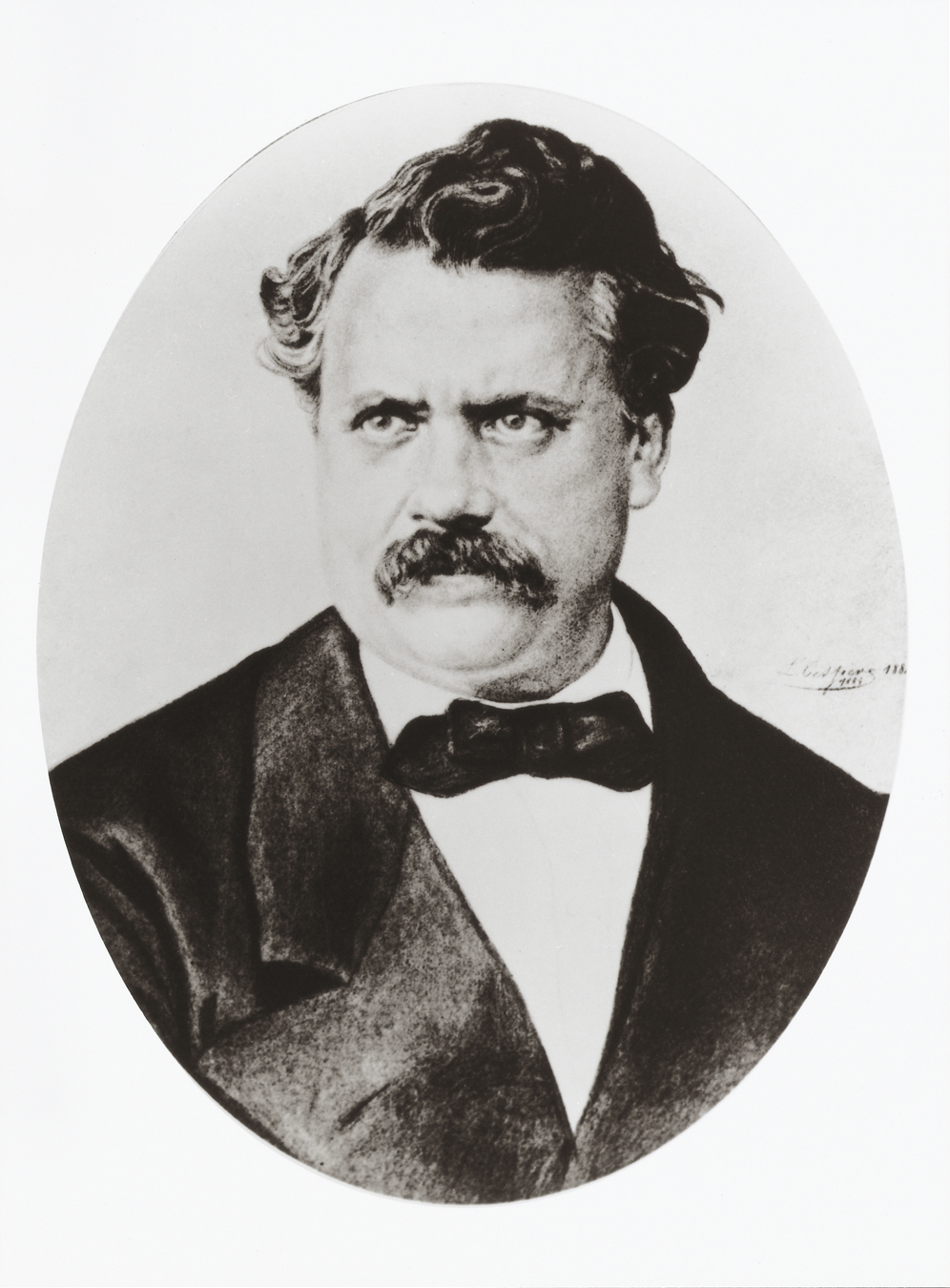
Louis Vuitton

- July 1 – Anatole Jean-Baptiste Antoine de Barthélemy, French archaeologist (d. 1904)
- July 2 – Sir Charles Tupper, 6th Prime Minister of Canada (d. 1915)
- July 6 – Edmund Pettus, American politician (d. 1907)
- July 9
  - George Cavendish-Bentinck, British Conservative politician (d. 1891)
  - Adolphus Frederick Alexander Woodford, British parson (d. 1887)
- July 13 – Nathan Bedford Forrest, American Confederate Civil War General, first Grand Wizard of the Ku Klux Klan (d. 1877)
- July 16 – Mary Baker Eddy, American founder of Christian Science (d. 1910)
- July 17 – Friedrich Engelhorn, German industrialist and founder of BASF (d. 1902)
- July 18
  - Lucy Smith Millikin, early Latter Day Saint and sister of Joseph Smith (d. 1882)
  - Pauline Viardot, French mezzo-soprano, composer (d. 1910)
- July 24 – William Poole, infamous member of New York City's Bowery Boys gang (d. 1855)
- July 27 – George H. Cooper, United States Navy admiral (d. 1891)
- August 10 – Jay Cooke, American financier (d. 1905)
- August 16 – Arthur Cayley, English mathematician (d. 1895)
- August 21 – Louis Vuitton, French fashion designer (d. 1892)
- August 31 – Hermann von Helmholtz, German physician and physicist (d. 1894)
- September 21 – Andrei Alexandrovich Popov, Russian admiral (d. 1898)
- September 28 – Jonathan Clarkson Gibbs, African-American minister, politician (d. 1874)

=== October–December ===
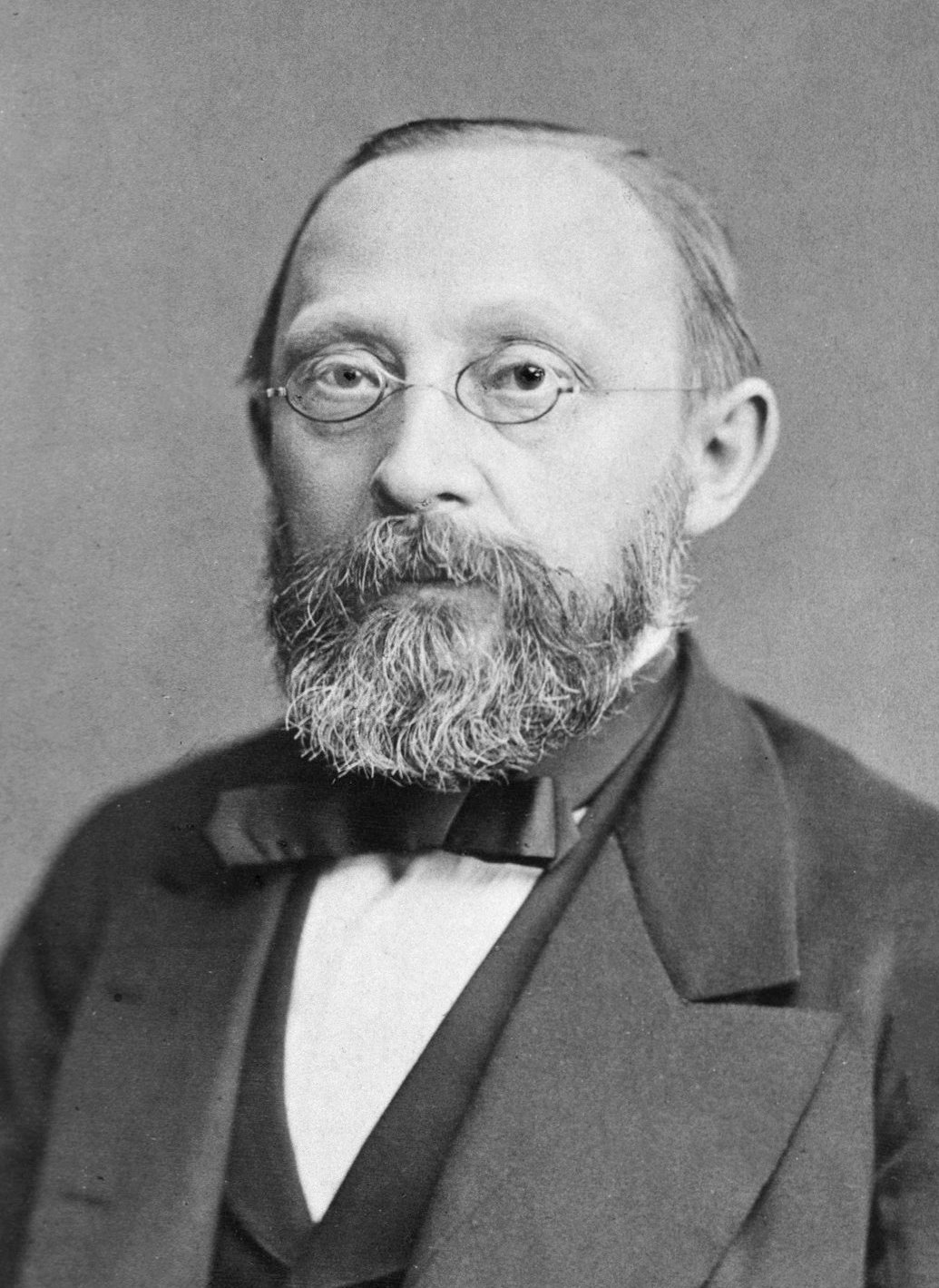
Rudolf Virchow

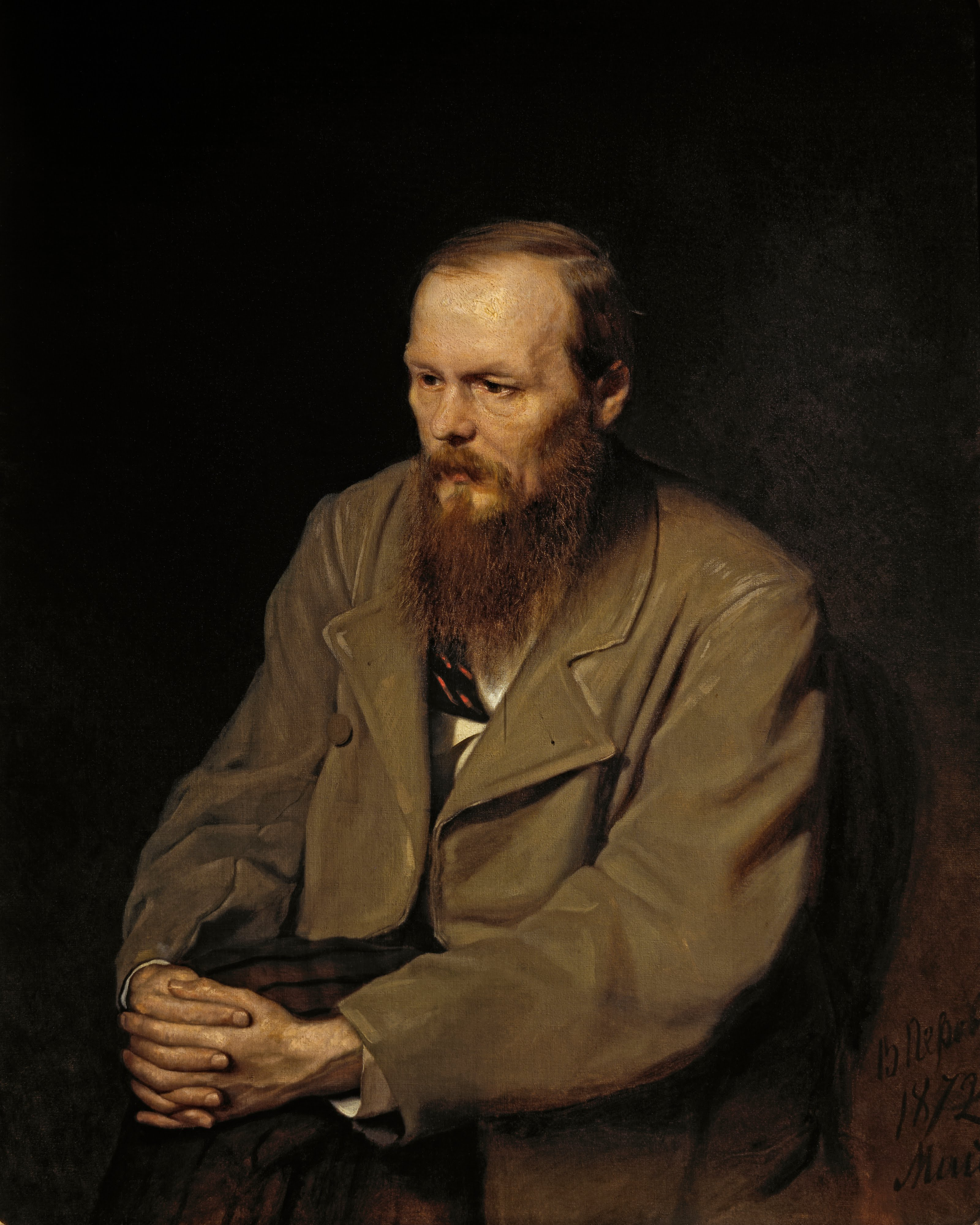
Fyodor Dostoyevsky

- October 13 – Rudolf Virchow, German physician, pathologist, biologist, and politician (d. 1902)
- October 17 – Alexander Gardner, Scottish photographer (d. 1882)
- November 7 – Andrea Debono, Maltese trader and explorer (d. 1871)
- November 11 – Fyodor Dostoyevsky, Russian writer (d. 1881)
- November 24 – Henry Thomas Buckle, English historian sometimes called "the father of scientific history" (d. 1862)
- November 26 – Miguel Lobo y Malagamba, Spanish admiral (d. 1876)
- November 30 – Frederick Temple, Archbishop of Canterbury (d. 1902)
- December 1 – John M. B. Clitz, American admiral (d. 1897)
- December 12 – Gustave Flaubert, French writer (d. 1880)
- December 22 – Junius Brutus Booth Jr., American actor, theatre manager (d. 1883)
- December 24 – Gabriel García Moreno, former President of Ecuador (d. 1875)
- December 25 – Clara Barton, first president of American Red Cross (d. 1912)

=== Date unknown ===
- Giuseppe Bonavia, Maltese architect (d. 1885)
- Mazhar Nanautawi, Indian freedom struggle activist (d. 1885)
- Tirso Salaverría, military and politician (d.1901)

== Deaths ==
=== January–June ===
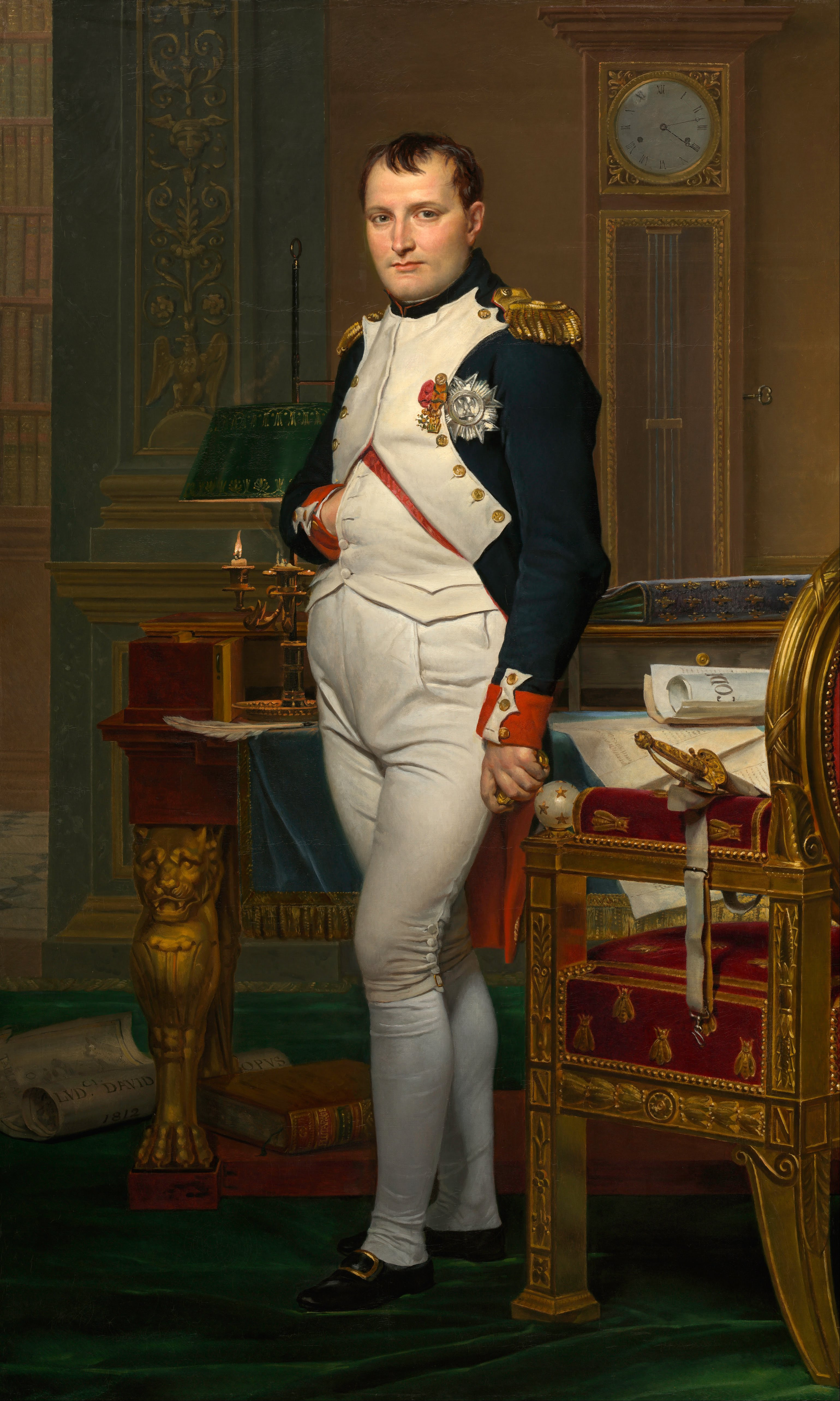
Napoleon Bonaparte

- January 4 – Elizabeth Ann Seton, American saint (b. 1774)
- January 5 – Carlo Porta, Milanese poet (b. 1775)
- January 19 – Alexandru Suţu, prince of Moldavia (b. 1758)
- February 23 – John Keats, British poet (b. 1795)
- February 26 – Joseph de Maistre, French-Savoyard philosopher (b. 1753)
- March 4 – Princess Elizabeth of Clarence, daughter of William, Duke of Clarence (later King William IV) (b. 1820)
- March 13 – John Hunter, second Governor of New South Wales (b. 1737)
- April 10 – Patriarch Gregory V of Constantinople (b. 1746)
- April 20 – Franz Karl Achard, German chemist, physicist and biologist (b. 1753)
- April 23 – Pierre de Ruel, marquis de Beurnonville, French general (b. 1752)
- May 2 – Hester Thrale, Welsh diarist and friend of Dr Johnson (b. 1741)
- May 5 – Napoleon Bonaparte, French Emperor and general (b. 1769)
- May 19 – Camille Jordan, French politician (b. 1771)
- June 7 – Tudor Vladimirescu, Wallachian rebel leader (b. c. 1780)
- June 17 – Martín Miguel de Güemes, Argentine military leader (b. 1785)
- June 19 – Peter Ochs, Swiss politician (b. 1752)
- June 23 – Louise Marie Adélaïde de Bourbon-Penthièvre, Duchess of Orléans, heiress, wife of Philippe Égalité (b. 1753)
- June 30 – José Fernando de Abascal y Sousa, viceroy of Peru (b. 1743)

=== July–December ===
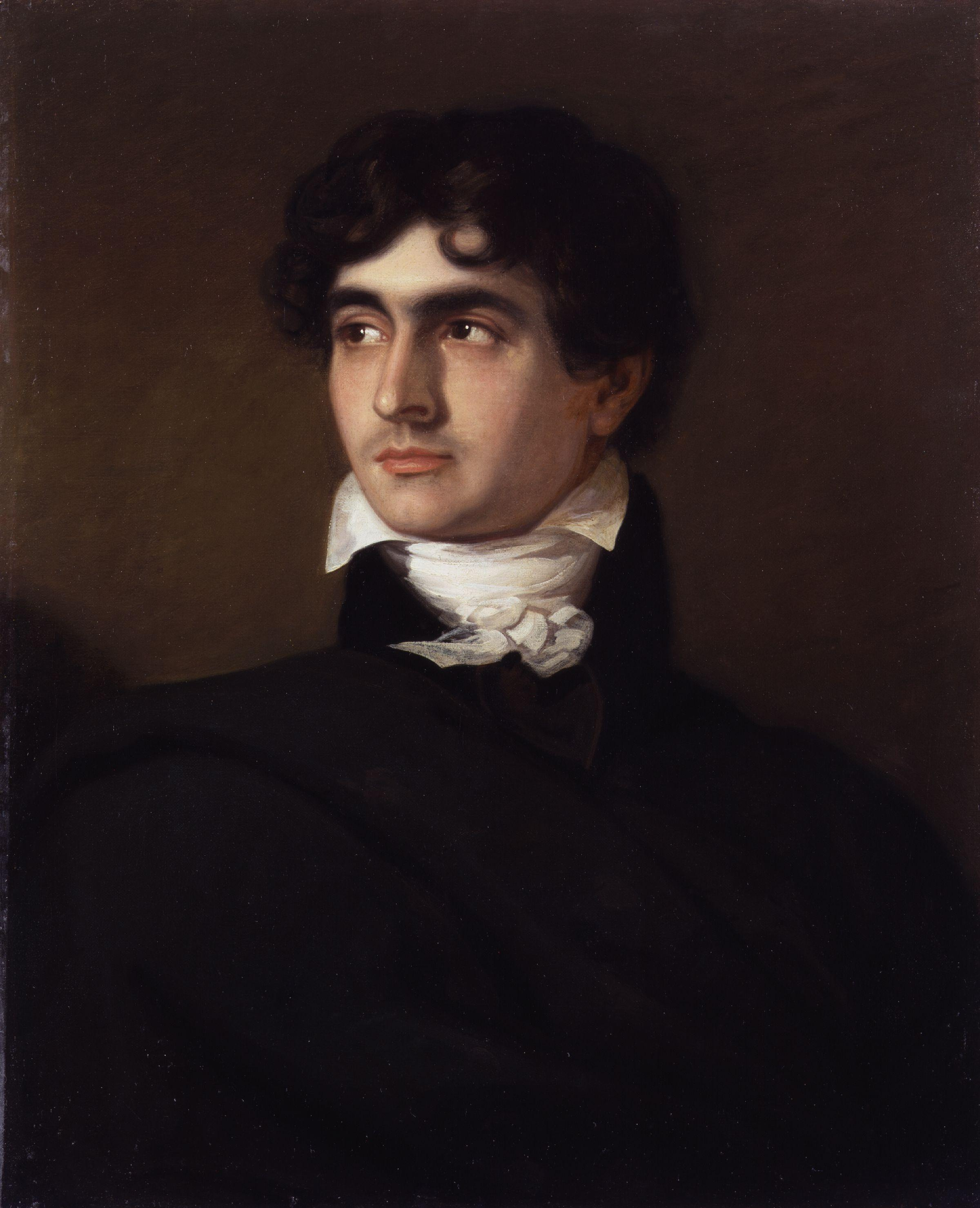
John William Polidori

- July 4 – Richard Cosway, English artist (b. 1742)
- July 14 – Pedro Juan Caballero, Paraguayan captain (b. 1786) (suicide)
- July 17 – Fulgencio Yegros, Paraguayan general and politician (b. 1780)
- August 7 – Caroline of Brunswick, Queen of the United Kingdom (b. 1768)
- August 20 – Dorothea von Medem, Latvian diploma, duchess of Courland (b. 1761)
- August 24 – John William Polidori, English physician, writer (b. 1795) (suicide)
- September 4 – José Miguel Carrera, Chilean general, founding father (b. 1785)
- September 10 – Johann Dominicus Fiorillo, German painter, art historian (b. 1748)
- September 14 – Heinrich Kuhl, German naturalist, zoologist (b. 1797)
- October 4 – Marie-Louise Lachapelle, French obstetrician (b. 1769)
- October 6 – Anders Jahan Retzius, Swedish chemist, botanist (b. 1742)
- October 8 – Juan O'Donojú, viceroy of New Spain (b. 1762)
- October 11 – John Ross Key, American judge, lawyer, father of songwriter Francis Scott Key (b. 1754)
- October 21 – Dorothea Ackermann, German actress (b. 1752)
- November 8 – Jean Rapp, French general (b. 1771)
- December 4 – John Henniker-Major, 2nd Baron Henniker, British politician (b. 1752)
- December 7 – King Pōmare II of Tahiti (b. 1782)
- December 12 – Phoebe Hessel, British female soldier (b. 1713)
