= Lavans-sur-Valouse =

- Part of Saint-Hymetière-sur-Valouse
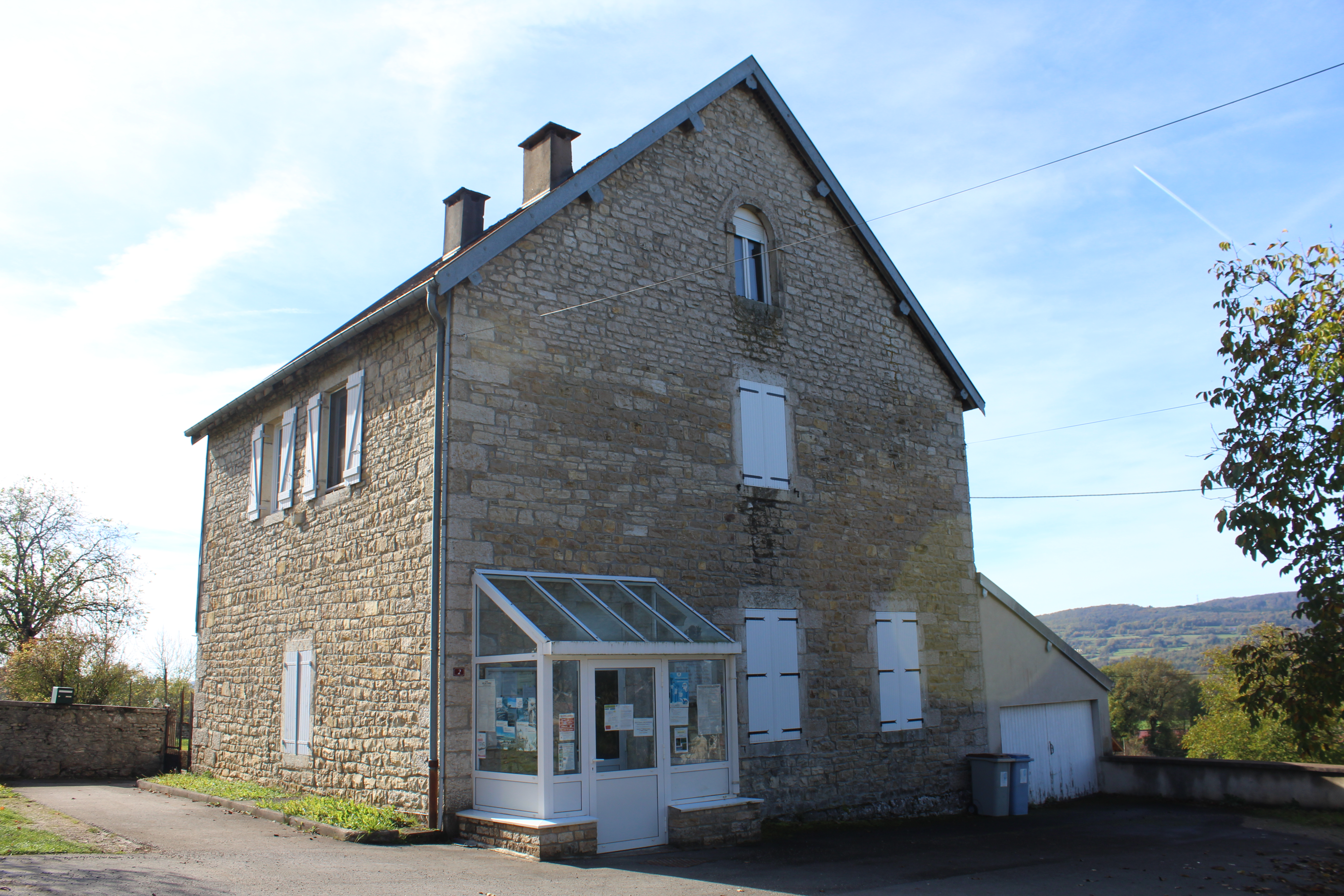
- Location of Lavans-sur-Valouse
- Location within France Location within Bourgogne-Franche-Comté
- Coordinates: 46°20′05″N 5°33′20″E
- Country: France
- Region: Bourgogne-Franche-Comté
- Department: Jura
- Arrondissement: Lons-le-Saunier
- Canton: Moirans-en-Montagne
- Commune: Saint-Hymetière-sur-Valouse
- Area^{1}: 9.51 km^{2} (3.67 sq mi)
- Highest elevation: 799 m (2,621 ft)
- Lowest elevation: 320 m (1,050 ft)
- Population (2016): 146
  - Density: 15.4/km^{2} (39.8/sq mi)
- Time zone: UTC+01:00 (CET)
  - Summer (DST): UTC+02:00 (CEST)
- Postal code: 39240
- ^{1} French Land Register data, which excludes lakes, ponds, glaciers > 1 km^{2} (0.386 sq mi or 247 acres) and river estuaries.

Lavans-sur-Valouse (French pronunciation: [lavɑ̃ syʁ valuz]) is a former commune in the Jura department in Bourgogne-Franche-Comté in eastern France. On 1 January 2019, it was merged into the new commune Saint-Hymetière-sur-Valouse.

== Population ==
Historical population

Year	Pop.	±%
1793	160	—
1806	114	−28.7%
1821	102	−10.5%
1831	420	+311.8%
1841	400	−4.8%
1851	426	+6.5%
1861	412	−3.3%
1872	393	−4.6%
1881	370	−5.9%
1891	323	−12.7%
1901	271	−16.1%
1911	256	−5.5%

Year	Pop.	±%
1921	234	−8.6%
1931	197	−15.8%
1946	176	−10.7%
1954	151	−14.2%
1962	132	−12.6%
1968	112	−15.2%
1975	85	−24.1%
1982	89	+4.7%
1990	113	+27.0%
1999	148	+31.0%
2006	139	−6.1%
2012	138	−0.7%

== See also ==
- Communes of the Jura department
